= List of Tangutologists =

Tangutology is the academic study of Tangut people, their culture, religion, history, language and writing system.

== List ==
| Picture | Name | Dates | Nationality | Significant contributions |
|---|---|---|---|---|
| Arakawa at the International Tangut Encoding Conference, Beijing, December 2013 | Arakawa Shintarō 荒川慎太郎 | b. 1971 | Japan | "Tangut Rhyme Dictionary" (1997); Tangut-Russian-English-Chinese Dictionary (2006) |
| | Bái Bīn 白濱 | 1936–2022 | China | Study of the Sea of Characters (1983); Researches in Tangut History (1989) |
| Mathieu Beaudouin, Academia Sinica, 2024 | Mathieu Beaudouin | b. 1989 | France | "Tangut and Horpa languages: Some morphosyntactic shared features" (2023); Grammaire du tangoute. Phonologie et morphologie. PhD dissertation. (2023) "Non-past and past verb stems in Tangut" (2024) |
| Self-portrait of Anna Bernhardi in 1891 | Anna Bernhardi | 1868–1944 | Germany | "Buddhistische Bilder aus der Glanzzeit der Tanguten" (1918) |
| Portrait of Bushell circa 1880–1890 | Stephen Wootton Bushell | 1844–1908 | UK | "The Hsi Hsia Dynasty of Tangut, their Money and Peculiar Script" (1895–1896) "The Tangut script in the Nan K'ou Pass" (1899) |
| | Gerard Clauson | 1891–1974 | UK | Skeleton Dictionary of the Hsi-Hsia Language (1938–1963, manuscript published posthumously in 2016) |
| Portrait of Gabriel Devéria circa 1886 | Gabriel Devéria | 1844–1899 | France | "L'Écriture du Royaume de Si-Hia ou Tangout" (1898) "Stèle Si-hia de Leang-tcheou" (1898) |
| | Ruth W. Dunnell | b. 1950 | US | "The 1094 Sino-Tangut Gantong Stupa Stele Inscription of Wuwei" (1988); The Great State of White and High: Buddhism and State Formation in Eleventh-Century Xia (1996) |
| Imre Galambos at the Institute of Oriental Manuscripts, St. Petersburg. July 2010. | Imre Galambos | b. 1967 | Hungary | "The Tangut translation of the General's Garden by Zhuge Liang" (2011); Translating Chinese Tradition and Teaching Tangut Culture (2015) |
| | Gong Hwang-cherng (Gōng Huángchéng) 龔煌城 | 1934–2010 | Taiwan | "The phonological reconstruction of Tangut through examination of phonological alternations" (1989) |
| Gong Xun at a conference in 2018 | Gōng Xūn 龔勳 | b. 1990 | China | "Uvulars and uvularization in Tangut phonology" (2020) |
| | Eric Grinstead | 1921–2008 | New Zealand | The Tangut Tripitaka (1971); Analysis of the Tangut Script (1972) |
| A photo of Leah Hicks from 2024. | Leah Hicks | 2026- | US | "A Proposed Phonetic Reconstruction of 𗺛" (2026), "𗀥: An Unusual Wenhai Entry in Tangut - Case Study" (2026), maintainer of Tangutpedia (2026-), Open Tangut (2026), Hugging Face Dataset for Tangut OCR |
| Han Xiaomang at the International Tangut Encoding Conference, Beijing, December 2013 | Hán Xiǎománg 韓小忙 | b. 1963 | China | Dictionary of Tangut 西夏文词典 [9 vols.] (2021) |
| | Huáng Zhènhuá 黃振華 | 1930–2003 | China | Study of the Sea of Characters (1983); Researches in Tangut History (1989) |
| | Aleksei Ivanovich Ivanov; Алексе́й Ива́нович Ивано́в | 1878–1937 | Russia | "Monuments de l'écriture tangout" (1920) |
| Guillaume Jacques at SOAS, University of London in April 2013 | Guillaume Jacques | b. 1979 | France | "The origin of vowel alternations in the Tangut verb" (2009) "The structure of the Tangut verb" (2011); Esquisse de phonologie et de morphologie historique du tangoute (2014) |
| Jia Changye at a conference in Yinchuan, August 2016 | Jiǎ Chángyè 賈常業 | b. 1954 | China | Newly Compiled Dictionary of Tangut Characters (2013) |
| Jing Yongshi at a conference in Yinchuan, August 2016 | Jǐng Yǒngshí 景永時 | b. 1959 | China | Translations of books and articles by Russian Tangutologists; Design of Tangut fonts |
| Ksenia Kepping at the British Library in 2001 | Ksenia Borisovna Kepping; Ксе́ния Бори́совна Ке́пинг | 1937–2002 | Russia | Sea of Characters (1969); Sunzi in Tangut translation (1979); Morphology of the Tangut Language (1985) "Tangut Ritual Language" (1996) |
| | Vsevolod Sergeevich Kolokolov; Все́волод Серге́евич Ко́локолов | 1896–1979 | Russia | Chinese Classics in Tangut Translation (1966); Sea of Characters (1969) |
| | Luc Kwanten | 1944–2021 | Belgium | The Timely Pearl: A 12th Century Tangut-Chinese Glossary (1982) "The Phonological hypothesis of the Hsi Hsia [Tangut] Language," (1984) "Special Research Problems in Hsi Hsia [Tangut] History and Linguistics" (1985) "The Structure of the Tangut [Hsi Hsia] characters" (1989) |
| Kychanov in his office in 2012 | Evgenij Ivanovich Kychanov; Евге́ний Ива́нович Кыча́нов | 1932–2013 | Russia | Chinese Classics in Tangut Translation (1966); Essay on the History of the Tangut State (1968); Sea of Characters (1969); Tangut-Russian-English-Chinese Dictionary' (2006) |
| Romain Lefebvre at the Tangut workshop in Hamburg, December 2015 | Romain Lefebvre | b. 1981 | France | L'imaginaire de l'autre : Étude et analyse de la réception du volume 41 de l'Avataṃsakasūtra en langue tangoute, conservé à l'Université de Pékin et à l'Institut des hautes études chinoises du Collège de France (2013) |
| | Lǐ Fànwén 李範文 | b. 1932 | China | Study of the Homophones (1986); Tangut-Chinese Dictionary (1997, 2008) |
| Lin Ying-chin at the International Tangut Encoding Conference, Beijing, December 2013 | Lin Ying-chin (Lín Yīngjīn) 林英津 | b. 1955 | Taiwan | Study of the Tangut translation of "Sunzi's Art of War" (1994) |
| Luo Zhenyu | Luó Zhènyù 羅振玉 | 1866–1940 | China | Collection of Western Xia Official Seals (1927) |
| Luo Fucheng | Luó Fúchéng 羅福成 | 1885–1960 | China | Study of the Lotus Sutra in Tangut (1914) |
| Luo Fuchang | Luó Fúcháng 羅福萇 | 1895–1921 | China | Brief Explanation of the Western Xia Script (1914) |
| | Luó Fúyí 羅福頤 | 1905–1981 | China | Collected Study of Official Seals of the Western Xia (1982) |
| Miyake at the British Museum, February 2015 | Marc Miyake | b. 1971 | US | "Sketch of Pre-Tangut" (2012) |
| | Georges Morisse | d. 1910 | France | "Contribution préliminaire à l'étude de l'écriture et de la langue si-hia" (1904) — study of the Tangut translation of the Saddharma Puṇḍarīka (Lotus Sutra). |
| Nevsky with his wife and daughter, Japan 1929 | Nikolai Aleksandrovich Nevsky; Никола́й Алекса́ндрович Не́вский | 1892–1937 | Russia | "A Brief Manual of the Si-Hia Characters with Tibetan Transcriptions" (1926); Tangut Philology (1960) |
| Nie Hongyin at the International Tangut Encoding Conference, Beijing, December 2013 | Niè Hóngyīn 聶鴻音 | b. 1954 | China | "Study of the phonetic symbols used in the Pearl in the Palm" (1987) "Tangutology During the Past Decades" (1993) |
| Nishida Tatsuo in 2008 | Nishida Tatsuo 西田龍雄 | 1928–2012 | Japan | Study of the Hsi-Hsia Language (1964); Language and Culture of the Tangut Kingdom (1997) |
| | Niú Dáshēng 牛达生 | b. 1933 | China | The Western Xia Square Pagoda at Baisigou (2005); Research into Western Xia Coins (2013) |
| Shi Jinbo in traditional Yi dress in 1961 | Shǐ Jīnbō 史金波 | b. 1940 | China | Study of the Sea of Characters (1983); Brief History of Buddhism in the Western Xia (1988); Study of Western Xia Publishing (2004); Tangut Language and Manuscripts: An Introduction 西夏文教程 (2013, English edition 2020); The Economy of Western Xia: A Study of 11th to 13th Century Tangut Records 西夏经济文书研究 (2017, English edition 2021) |
| | Mikhail Viktorovich Sofronov; Михаи́л Ви́кторович Софро́нов | b. 1929 | Russia | Grammar of the Tangut Language (1968) |
| Kirill Solonin at a conference on Tangut studies at the Centre for the Study of Manuscript Cultures, Hamburg University, December 2015 | Kirill Iurʹevich Solonin; Кири́лл Ю́рьевич Соло́нин | b. 1969 | Russia | "Hongzhou Buddhism in Xixia and the Heritage of Zongmi (780–841)" (2003) "The Chan Teaching of Nanyang Huizhong (?-775) in Tangut Translation" (2012) "The "Perfect Teaching" and Liao Sources of Tangut Chan Buddhism: A Study of Jiexing zhaoxin tu" (2013) |
| Sun Bojun at the International Tangut Encoding Conference, Beijing, December 2013 | Sūn Bójūn 孫伯君 | b. 1966 | China | "Sanskrit-Chinese phonetic transcriptions and the Northwest Chinese dialect in Tangut translations of sūtras" (2007) |
| Tai Chung-pui at the International Tangut Encoding Conference, Beijing, December 2013 | Tai Chung-pui 戴忠沛 | b. 1977 | China (Hong Kong) | "Collation of five newly seen Tangut fragments with Tibetan transcription" (2009) |
| | Anatoly Pavlovich Terentev-Katansky; Анато́лий Па́влович Тере́нтьев-Ката́нский | 1934–1998 | Russia | Book Publishing in the Tangut State (1981); Sea of Characters (1969) |
| Wang Jingru at the Mogao Caves in Dunhuang, 1964 | Wáng Jìngrú 王静如 | 1903–1990 | China | "Notes on the Chinese and Tibetan transcriptions of the Hsi-hsia (Tangutan) language" (1930); Research on the Western Xia (1933) "Introduction to the Phonetic System of the Tangut Language" (1982) |
| Andrew West at the Cloud Platform at Juyongguan, in front of a Tangut Buddhist inscription, December 2013 | Andrew West | 1960–2025 | UK | 2012. "Musical Notation for Flute in Tangut Manuscripts". In Irina Fedorovna Popova (ed.), Тангуты в Центральной Азии: сборник статей в честь 80-летия проф. Е.И.Кычанова [Tanguts in Central Asia: a collection of articles marking the 80th anniversary of Prof. E. I. Kychanov] pp. 443–453. Moscow: Oriental Literature. ISBN 978-5-02-036505-6; 2016. Gerard Clauson's Skeleton Tangut (Hsi Hsia) Dictionary: A facsimile edition. With an introduction by Imre Galambos. With Editorial notes and an Index by Andrew West. Prepared for publication by Michael Everson. Portlaoise: Evertype. ISBN 978-1-78201-167-5. |
| | Stuart N. Wolfenden | 1889–1938 | US | "On the Tibetan Transcription of Si-Hia Words" (1931) "On the Prefixes and Consonantal Finals of Si-Hia as evidenced by their Chinese and Tibetan transcriptions" (1934) |
| | Viacheslav Petrovich Zaytsev; Вячесла́в Петро́вич За́йцев | b. 1976 | Russia | "Re-examination of the Tangut Fragment Or. 12380/3495 from the Collection of the British Library" (2016) |

== See also ==
- List of Khitanologists
- List of sinologists
- List of Tangut books
