= Eric Grinstead =

New Zealand sinologist and Tangutologist (1921–2008)

Eric Douglas Grinstead
- Born: 30 July 1921; Wanganui, New Zealand
- Died: November , 2008 (aged 87); Copenhagen, Denmark
- Citizenship: New Zealand
- Education: Victoria University of Wellington
- Known for: Analysis of the Tangut script
- Scientific career
- Fields: Linguistics, Tangutology
- Workplaces: British Museum; Scandinavian Institute of Asian Studies

Eric Douglas Grinstead (30 July 1921 – November 2008) was a New Zealand sinologist and Tangutologist, who was best known for his analysis of the Tangut script.

== Biography ==
Grinstead was born in Wanganui, New Zealand, on 30 July 1921. He studied at Wanganui Technical College and then at Victoria University College in Wellington where in 1942 he obtained a master's degree. He then went to England to do post-graduate study for a bachelor's degree at the University of London. After graduating he worked as assistant keeper in the Department of Oriental Printed Books and Manuscripts at the British Museum. During the late 1960s and 1970s he worked at the Scandinavian Institute of Asian Studies in Copenhagen, Denmark. He died at Copenhagen in November 2008.

== Contributions to Tangut studies ==
Grinstead became interested in the Tangut script whilst working at the Department of Oriental Printed Books and Manuscripts at the British Museum (later part of the British Library). Although the British Museum did not possess many complete or nearly complete Tangut texts, it did hold about 6,000 fragments of printed and manuscript texts written in the Tangut script, mostly of a Buddhist nature, that had been collected by Aurel Stein from the Tangut fortress city of Khara-Khoto from 1913 to 1916. These fragments had been largely ignored by Tangutologists, but during the 1960s Grinstead published several brief articles about them in the British Museum Quarterly. One of his articles, in 1963, identified the first non-Buddhist Tangut manuscript from Stein's collection, a unique manuscript copy of a Tangut translation/adaptation of a Chinese work on military strategy ascribed to Zhuge Liang entitled The General's Garden. In 1964, Grinstead made a visit to the Leningrad branch of the Institute of Oriental Studies, which held the Kozlov collection of Tangut documents from Khara-Khoto, and spent a month there studying Tangut texts with Yevgeny Kychanov and A. P. Terentev-Katansky.

In the late 1960s Lokesh Chandra invited Grinstead to catalogue a large collection of about 15,000 photographs and photocopies of Tangut Buddhist texts that had been acquired by his father, the famous Sanskrit scholar Raghu Vira (died 1963), during visits to the Soviet Union and the People's Republic of China during the 1950s. These comprised the majority of the Tangut Buddhist manuscript and printed texts held at the Institute of Oriental Manuscripts of the Russian Academy of Sciences and the National Library of China, and at that time were the only unified collection of Tangut Buddhist texts in the world. With the support of the Scandinavian Institute of Asian Studies (where Grinstead was now working) and with funding from the Tuborg Foundation, a plan was put into place to preserve and publish this collection of Tangut texts. Grinstead was editor of the facsimile edition (comprising 2,249 pages, with six or eight Tangut sheets per page) that was printed in 1971 in New Delhi under the title The Tangut Tripitaka.

Grinstead's major publication was his Analysis of the Tangut script (1972) in which he analysed the structure of the Tangut script, and assigned a four-digit 'Telecode' number to each Tangut character in an early attempt to assign standard codes to characters for use in computer processing of Tangut text. The book also includes an English–Tangut vocabulary list, and a study of the Tangut translation of the Classic of Filial Piety (Xiao Jing) in which Grinstead transcribed the very hard to read cursive Tangut characters of the text into their standard forms, which was considered an important achievement by other Tangut scholars. However, the book has been criticized as being difficult to read, having a 'haphazard' structure and an 'allusive' written style.

Analysis of the Tangut script is a version of a PhD dissertation that Grinstead submitted to the Faculty of Philosophy at the University of Copenhagen on 29 November 1971, and which he defended on 30 January 1973.

== Works ==
- 1961. "Tangut Fragments in the British Museum"; British Museum Quarterly vol. 24 nos. 3–4: 82–87.
- 1963. "The General's Garden"; British Museum Quarterly vol. 26 nos. 1–2: 35–37.
- 1966–1967. "The Dragon King of the Sea"; British Museum Quarterly vol. 31.
- 1967. Tangut Studies. Working notes on texts from Kharakhoto, the "dead city" of NW China, which is the site of excavations made in 1908 and 1912 that revealed the culture of the Tangut people of Hsi-hsia, a Central Asian state of the 10th-early 13th centuries. Notes on a Zen Text of the 12th cent. Notes on a military text in the British Museum., The General's Garden. The Book of Filial Piety in standard script. Indexes to Buddhist and Taoist literature. Leiden, 1967. 10 vols. Published as 60 microfiche by Inter-Documentation Company AG, Zug Switzerland. IDC Micro-Edition 329: Box 1: IDC CH-813-1, fiche no. 01–29 (Vol. 01–04); Box 2: IDC CH-813-2, fiche no. 30–60 (Vol. 05–10).
- 1971. The Tangut Tripitaka parts 1–9 (Śata-piṭaka series 83–91). New Delhi: Sharada Rani.
- 1972. "The Tangut Tripitaka, Some Background Notes"; Sung Studies Newsletter no. 6 (October 1972): 19–23.
- 1972. Analysis of Tangut script (Scandinavian Institute of Asian Studies Monograph Series no. 10). Lund: Studentlitteratur. ISBN 91-44-09191-5
- 1972. Guide to the Archaic Chinese script (Scandinavian Institute of Asian Studies Monograph Series no. 11). Lund: Studentlitteratur. ISBN 91-44-09411-6
- 1978. "Tibetan studies by computer"; Proceedings of the Csoma de Körös Memorial Symposium (Bibl. Orientalis Hungarica 23) 109.2–3. Budapest: Akademiai Kiad.
