= Nikolai Nevsky =

Russian linguist

- Николай Невский
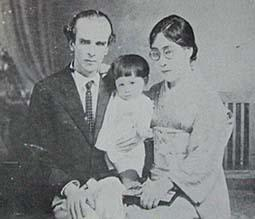
- Nevsky with his wife and daughter in Japan, c. 1929
- Born: 1 March 1892 (N.S.); 18 February 1892 (O.S.); Yaroslavl, Russian Empire
- Died: 24 November 1937 (aged 45); Leningrad, Russian SFSR, Soviet Union
- Cause of death: Execution following arrest by the NKVD
- Spouse: Isoko Mantani-Nevsky
- Children: 1
- Awards: Lenin Prize (1962)

Academic background
- Education: Saint Petersburg University

Academic work
- Discipline: Linguist
- Main interests: Tangutology

Nikolai Aleksandrovich Nevsky (Russian: Николай Александрович Невский; the surname is also transcribed Nevskij; 1 March [O.S. 18 February] 1892 – 24 November 1937) was a Russian and Soviet linguist, an expert on a number of East Asian languages. He was one of the founders of the modern study of the Tangut language of the Western Xia Empire, the work for which he was awarded the degree of Doctor of Science in Philology during his life, and Lenin Prize posthumously. He spent most of his research career in Japan before returning to the USSR. He was arrested and executed during the Great Purge; his surviving manuscripts were published much later, starting in 1960.

== Early life ==
He graduated from Rybinsk Gymnasium in 1909 with a silver medal, the second class of distinction, and entered the St Petersburg Institute of Technology. However, after a year, he transferred to the Department of Oriental Languages of the Saint Petersburg University, where he graduated in 1914. Among his teachers were Vasiliy Mikhaylovich Alekseyev and Aleksei Ivanovich Ivanov.

== In Japan ==
In 1915, Nevsky was sent to Japan for two years, but the Russian Revolutions and the Russian Civil War made him remain there for fourteen years.

In Japan, he travelled around the country, studying the Ainu language and the Ainu people as well as the Miyako language of the Miyako Islands and the Tsou language of the Tsou people of Taiwan (then part of the Japanese Empire). He published research articles in Japanese journals.

He started learning Miyako from a student named Ueunten Kenpu, who entered Tokyo Higher Normal School in 1919. He visited the Miyako Islands in 1922, 1926 and 1928. He invented a Cyrillization of Miyako; recorded Miyako's epic songs, called āgu and left an unpublished Miyako lexicon.

In 1925, Nevsky began to decipher manuscripts in Tangut that had been discovered in 1909 in Khara-Khoto by Pyotr Kozlov.

While in Japan he married Iso (Isoko) Mantani-Nevsky (Исо (Исоко) Мантани-Невская, 萬谷イソ, 萬谷磯子, 1901–1937), with whom he had a daughter, Yelena (1928–2017).

== Return to Russia ==
Persuaded by Soviet scholars and officials, Nevsky returned to Leningrad, renamed from St. Petersburg, in the autumn of 1929, leaving his wife and young daughter in Japan. He worked at the Leningrad State University, the Leningrad Institute of Philosophy, Literature and History; Институт философии, литературы и истории, the Institute of Oriental Studies (then based in Leningrad) and the Hermitage Museum. His wife and daughter joined him in Leningrad in 1933. In January 1935 he was awarded a Doctor of Science degree based on the sum of his work without submitting a thesis.

== Arrest and death ==
In the night of 3–4 October 1937 he was arrested by the NKVD on the charge of being a Japanese spy. On 24 November 1937, he was executed, along with his wife. Their daughter, Yelena, was initially looked after by N. I. Konrad, but in 1941 was adopted by a distant relative of Nevsky, Viktor Leontyevich Afrosimov.

== Legacy ==
He was rehabilitated in 1957. He was posthumously awarded, in 1962, the Lenin Prize for the book "Tangut Philology". It was published in 1960 and was based on some of his surviving materials on the Tangut language. His other surviving manuscripts continued to be published, but many of his materials seem to be irretrievably lost.

== Works ==
- Колпакчи Е.М., Невский Н.А. Начальный учебник японского разговорного языка. Л., 1933. 128 стр. 500 экз.// Kolpakchi E.M., Nevskiy N.A. Introductory course of spoken Japanese. Leningrad, 1933. 128 p. 500 copies.
- Колпакчи Е.М., Невский Н.А. Японский язык. Начальный курс. Л., 1934. 232 стр. Kolpakchi E.M., Nevskiy N.A. Japanese language: Introductory Course, Leningrad, 1934. 232 p.
- Материалы по говорам языка цоу. М.-Л., Изд-во АН. 1935. 134 стр. 1000 экз. Materials on the Tsou dialects. Moscow-Leningrad, Academy of Sciences Publishing House. 1935. 134 p. 1000 copies.
- Тангутская филология. Исследования и словарь. В 2 кн. М., ИВЛ. 1960. 1000 экз. Кн.1. Исследования. Тангутский словарь. Тетради I-III. 602 стр. Кн.2. Тангутский словарь. Тетради IV-VIII. 684 стр. // Tangut philology. Research and dictionary. In two volumes. Moscow, Oriental Literature Publishing House, 1960. 1000 copies. Volume One: Research. Tangut Dictionary. (Notebooks I-III). 602 pp. Volume Two, Tangut Dictionary. (Notebooks IV-VIII). 684 p.
- Айнский фольклор. / Исследования, тексты и пер. М., Наука. 1972. 175 стр. 2000 экз. * The Ainu Folklore: Research, Texts, and Translagtions. Moscow, Nauka Publishers. 1972. 175 pages 2000 copies.
- Фольклор островов Мияко. М., Наука. 1978. 192 стр. 7000 экз.// The Folklore of the Miyako Islands''. Moscow, Nauka Publishers. 1978. 192 pages 7000 copies.
- Материалы по говорам языка цоу; Словарь диалекта северных цоу. М., Наука. 1981. 292 стр. 950 экз. Materials on the Tsou dialects; A Dictionary of the Northern Tsou Dialect. Moscow, Nauka Publishers. 1981. 292 p. 950 copies.

== Sources ==
- Громковская Л. Л., Кычанов Е. И. Николай Александрович Невский. (Серия «Русские востоковеды и путешественники»). М., Наука (ГРВЛ). 1978. 216 стр. Тираж: 10000 экз. L. Gromkovskaya, E.I Kychanov. Nikolai Aleksandrovich Nevsky. Moscow, Nauka Publishers. 1978. 216 pages. 10000 copies.
- На стёклах вечности... Николай Невский. Переводы, исследования, материалы к биографии // Петербургское востоковедение. Выпуск 8. СПб., Центр «Петербургское востоковедение», 1996. С. 239–560. ISBN 5-85803-077-7 (вып. 8) ISSN 0869-8392 Тираж: 1000 экз. The Windows of Eternity... Nikolai Nevsky // St. Petersburg Journal of Oriental Studies. Volume 8. St. Petersburg, St. Petersburg Centre for Oriental Studies. 1996. pp. 239–560. 1000 copies.
