= Imre Galambos =

Hungarian sinologist and tangutologist (born 1967)

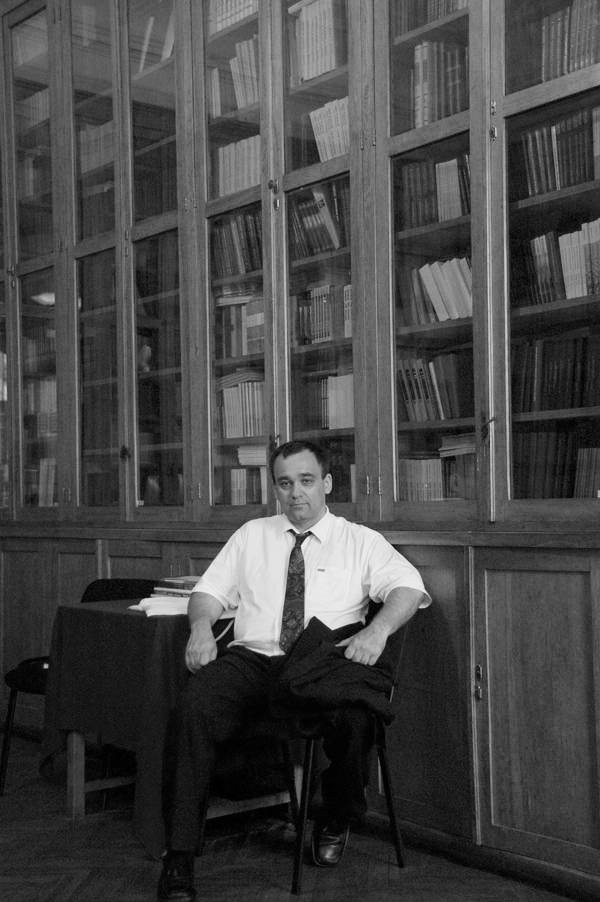
Imre Galambos at the Institute of Oriental Manuscripts, Saint Petersburg, July 2010

Imre Galambos (Chinese: 高奕睿; pinyin: Gāo Yìruì; born 1967) is a Hungarian sinologist and Tangutologist who specialises in the study of medieval Chinese and Tangut manuscripts from Dunhuang. He is Professor Emeritus of Chinese at the University of Cambridge, and Qiushi Chair Professor at the School of Literature, Zhejiang University.

== Biography ==
Galambos was born in Szőny, Hungary in 1967, and studied at the Eötvös Loránd University in Budapest. After graduating with an MA in 1994 he went on to study at the University of California, Berkeley, and in 2002 he was awarded a PhD, with a dissertation on Chinese writing during the Warring States period.

Galambos worked at the British Library in London, England from 2002 to 2012, where he was a member of the team working on the International Dunhuang Project. During this time he specialised in the study of Dunhuang manuscripts, and collaborated with Sam van Schaik on a study of a Dunhuang manuscript comprising the letters of a 10th-century Chinese Buddhist monk on pilgrimage from China to India. Whilst at the British Library he also published studies on The General's Garden and other Tangut translations of Chinese military treatises.

During 2012-2023 Galambos taught pre-modern Chinese subjects in the Faculty of Asian and Middle Eastern Studies at the University of Cambridge, until his retirement in 2023. Subsequently, he took up a teaching post at the School of Literature, Zhejiang University, where he is now Qiushi Chair Professor.

== Works ==
- 2020. Dunhuang Manuscript Culture: End of the First Millennium (open-access). Berlin: DeGruyter. ISBN 9783110726572.
- 2018. (ed.) of Arthur Cooper's The Other Greek. An Introduction to Chinese and Japanese Characters, Their History and Influence (Leiden: Brill). ISBN 978-90-04-36904-7.
- 2016. Gerard Clauson's Skeleton Tangut (Hsi Hsia) Dictionary: A facsimile edition. With an introduction by Imre Galambos. With Editorial notes and an Index by Andrew West. Prepared for publication by Michael Everson. Portlaoise: Evertype. ISBN 978-1-78201-167-5.
- 2015. Translating Chinese Tradition and Teaching Tangut Culture: Manuscripts and Printed Books from Khara-Khoto (open-access). Berlin: DeGruyter. ISBN 978-3-11-045395-9.
- 2012. "Consistency in Tangut Translations of Chinese Military Texts". In Irina Fedorovna Popova (ed.), Тангуты в Центральной Азии: сборник статей в честь 80-летия проф. Е.И.Кычанова [Tanguts in Central Asia: a collection of articles marking the 80th anniversary of Prof. E. I. Kychanov] pp. 84–96. Moscow: Oriental Literature. ISBN 978-5-02-036505-6
- 2011. With Sam van Schaik. Manuscripts and Travellers: The Sino-Tibetan Documents of a Tenth-Century Buddhist Pilgrim. Berlin, New York: De Gruyter. ISBN 978-90-04-18203-5
- 2011. "The northern neighbors of the Tangut"; in Cahiers de Linguistique Asie Orientale 40: 69–104.
- 2011. "The Tangut translation of the General’s Garden by Zhuge Liang"; in Written Monuments of the Orient 14(1): 131–142.
- 2008. "A 10th-century manuscript from Dunhuang concerning the Gantong monastery at Liangzhou"; Tonkō Shahon Kenkyū Nenpō (敦煌寫本研究年報) 2: 63–82.
- 2006. Orthography of Early Chinese Writing: Evidence from Newly Excavated Manuscripts (490–221 BC). Budapest Monographs in East Asian Studies. Budapest: Eötvös Loránd University.
