= Shi Jinbo =

Shi Jinbo 史金波
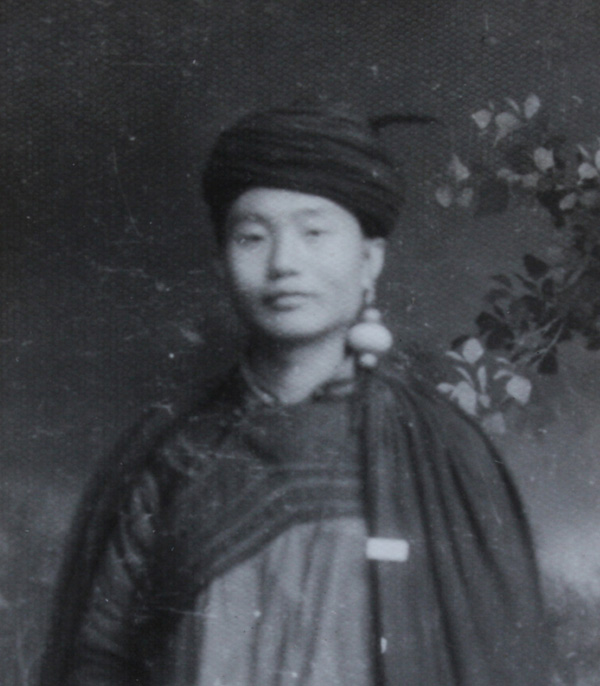
- Shi Jinbo dressed in Yi costume in 1961
- Born: March 3, 1940; Gaobeidian, Hebei, China
- Citizenship: China
- Education: Chinese Academy of Social Sciences
- Scientific career
- Fields: Linguistics, Tangutology
- Workplaces: Chinese Academy of Social Sciences
- Academic advisors: Wang, Jingru

Shi Jinbo (Chinese: 史金波) (born 3 March 1940) is a Chinese linguist and Tangutologist.

== Biography ==
Shi Jinbo was born in Gaobeidian City, Hebei in 1940. After leaving school, he enrolled at the Central College for Nationalities in Beijing, where he studied the Yi language. During 1960–1961 Shi went to live among impoverished Yi peasants in the Liangshan Yi Autonomous Prefecture of Sichuan in order to improve his language skills, and by the end of his time there he was fluent enough in the Liangshan Yi language to be able to act as an interpreter for a local government committee.

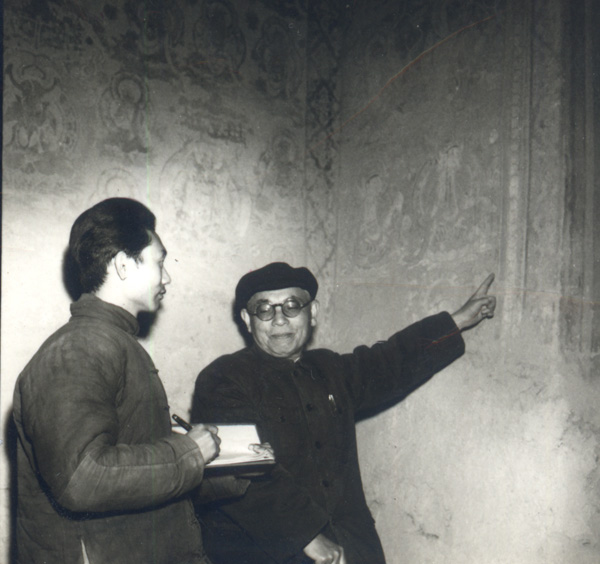
Shi Jinbo with Wang Jingru at the Mogao Caves in 1964

He graduated in 1962, and encouraged by Wang Jingru (王靜如), his advisor for his Master's degree, who believed that the extinct Tangut language was related to the Yi language, Shi applied to study Tangut language as a postgraduate at the Institute of Ethnology of the Chinese Academy of Social Sciences. After graduating in 1966, Shi joined a team researching the Western Xia caves at the Mogao Caves near Dunhuang in Gansu, and based on his translation of Tangut inscriptions in the caves he was able to identify a large number of caves as dating to the period during which Dunhuang was governed by the Western Xia regime (1036–1226).

Shi's academic career was curtailed by the Cultural Revolution, and in 1970 he was assigned to train as a stonemason at a cadre school in Henan. He returned to Beijing in 1972, and resumed the study of Tangut in his spare time, compiling a Tangut dictionary on his own. He managed to get permission to access the Tangut materials held at the Beijing Library, and for three months he was able to engage in private research at the library. In 1974 Shi published his first article on Tangut literature.

In 1975 Shi rejoined the Institute of Ethnology, and during 1975 and 1976 he and Bai Bin (白濱) carried out extensive fieldwork at Western Xia sites. He then worked on a translation and study of the Tangut rime dictionary, the Sea of Characters, which was published in 1983. Later, he worked on translations of a variety of Tangut texts, including Buddhist texts, an encyclopedia and a set of legal statutes.

Shi has not restricted himself to linguistic research, but has also made important contributions to the understanding of Tangut history and culture. In 1988 he published an influential study of Tangut Buddhism and Tangut Buddhist art. He has also published studies on the history of printing in China, with particular emphasis on printing during the Western Xia. In 1990 he won an award as a "Young or Middle-Aged Expert who has made Outstanding Contributions".

Shi is currently a Professor and Fellow emeritus of the Chinese Academy of Social Sciences and the Minzu University of China, Director of the Centre for Tangut Cultural Studies (西夏文化研究中心), and a part-time professor at Ningxia University.

== Works ==
- 2021. The Economy of Western Xia: A Study of 11th to 13th Century Tangut Records. Shi Jinbo. Edited and Translated by Hansong Li. Leiden: Brill, 2021.
- 2020. Tangut Language and Manuscripts: An Introduction. Shi, Jinbo. Translated by Hansong Li. Leiden: Brill, 2020.
- 2016. Xixia Jiji Wenshu 西夏經濟文書. Beijing: Social Sciences Academic Press, 2017.
- 2013. Xixiawen Jiaocheng 西夏文教程. Beijing: Social Science Academic Press, 2013.
- 2012. "The Pillar of Tangutology: E.I. Kychanov's Contribution and Influence on Tangut Studies". In Irina Fedorovna Popova (ed.), Тангуты в Центральной Азии: сборник статей в честь 80-летия проф. Е.И.Кычанова [Tanguts in Central Asia: a collection of articles marking the 80th anniversary of Prof. E. I. Kychanov] pp. 469–480. Moscow: Oriental Literature. ISBN 978-5-02-036505-6
- 2005. Shi Jinbo Wenji 史金波文集 [Selected works of Shi Jinbo]. Shanghai: Shanghai Cishu Chubanshe.
- 2004. Xixia Chuban Yanjiu 西夏出版研究 [Study of Publishing during the Western Xia]. Yinchuan: Ningxia Renmin Chubanshe, 2004.
- 2002. With Yasen Wushou’er. "Zhongguo huozi yinshuashu de faming he zaoqi chuanbo—Xixia he Huigu huozi yinshuashu yanjiu" 中国活字印刷术的发明和早期传播—西夏和回鹘活字印刷术研究 [The Discovery and Early Spread of Chinese Movable Printing Technology—Studies on Tangut and Uyghur Movable Print Technology]. Beijing: Shehui Kexue Wenxian Chubanshe.
- 1999. With Yao Zhaolin 姚兆麟 and Li Jianshang 李堅尚. Xizang Renquan Yanjiu 西藏人权研究 [Studies on Human Rights in Tibet]. Beijing: Zhongguo Zangxue Chubanshe and Zhongguo Shehui Kexue Chubanshe.
- 1994. With Nie Hongyin and Bai Bin. "Xixia Tiansheng Lüling Yizhu" 西夏天盛律令譯註 [Annotated Translation of the Western Xia 'Tiansheng Statutes']. Beijing: Kexue Chubanshe, 1994.
- 1992. "Xixia Dangxiang ren de qinshu chengwei he hunyin" 西夏党項人的親屬稱謂和婚姻 [Kinship and marriage among the Western Xia Tangut people]; Minzu Yanjiu January 1992
- 1989. "'Leilin' Xixia wenyiben he Xixiayu yanjiu" [Studies on Tangut language and the Tangut translation of 'Lei Lin']; Minzu Yuwen June 1989
- 1988. With Nie Hongyin 聶鴻音 and Huang Zhenhua. "Heishui chutu Xixiaben Leilin kaobian" 黑水出土西夏本《類林》考辨 [Study of the Tangut edition of the 'Leilin' from Kharakhoto]; Zhongyang Minzu Xueyuan Xuebao February 1988: 52–58.
- 1988. With Bai Bin. Xixia Fojiao shilüe 西夏佛教史略 [A Brief History of Buddhism during the Western Xia]. Yinchuan.
- 1988. Xixia fojiao shilüe 西夏佛教史略 [History of Buddhism during the Western Xia]. Yinchuan: Ningxia Renmin Chubanshe, 1988.
- 1987. With Huang Zhenhua. "Heicheng xinchu Xixiawen cishu Yintong chushi" 黑城新出西夏文辭書音同初釋 [Preliminary interpretation of a newly discovered version of the Tangut dictionary 'Homophones' from Kharakhoto]; Wenwu July 1987: 24–35.
- 1987. With Bai Bin. Xixia Wenhua 西夏文化 [Western Xia Culture]. Changchun.
- 1986. "Xixia minghao za kao" 西夏名號雜考 [Notes on the name of the Western Xia]; Zhongyang Minzu Xueyuan Xuebao April 1986: 72–76.
- 1985. With Huang Runhua 黃潤華. "Beijing tushuguan cang Xixiawen Fojing zhengli ji" 北京圖書館藏西夏文佛經整理記 [Notes on cataloguing Tangut Buddhist sutras held at the Beijing Library]; Wenxian April 1985: 238–251.
- 1984. With Bai Bin. "Mingdai Xixiawen jingjuan he shichuang zaitan" 明代西夏文經卷和石幢再探 [Further investigations into Ming dynasty Tangut sutras and stone dharani columns]. In Bai Bin (ed.), Xixiashi Lunwenji 西夏史論文集 [Collected Essays on Western Xia History] (Yinchuan, 1984): 600–622.
- 1983. "Xixiayu de cunzai dongci" 西夏語的存在動詞 [The existential verbs of Tangut]"; Yuyan Yanjiu 1983.2: 215–228.
- 1983. With Bai Bin and Huang Zhenhua 黃振華. Wenhai Yanjiu 文海研究 [Studies on the Sea of Characters]. Beijing: Zhongguo Shehui Kexue Chubanshe.
- 1982. With Bai Bin. "Mogaoku Yulinku Xixiawen tiji yanjiu" 莫高窟榆林窟西夏文題記研究 [Studies on the Tangut inscriptions at the Mogao and Yulin caves]; Kaogu Xuebao March 1982: 367–386.
- 1982. "Xixiayu zhong de Hanyu jieci" 西夏語中的漢語藉詞 [Chinese loan words in Tangut]; Zhongyang Minzu Xueyuan Xuebao April 1982: 29–34.
- 1982. "Xixiayu goucizhong de jige wenti" 西夏語構詞中的幾個問題 [Some Problems in the word-formation of Tangut Language]; Minzu Yuwen February 1982: 20–25.
- 1981. "Lüelun Xixia wenzi de gouzao" 略论西夏文字的构造 [A sketch of the structure of the Tangut script]. In Minzu yuwen lunji 民族语文论集 [A collection of essays concerning the languages of the ethnic minorities] (Beijing: Zhongguo Shehui Kexue Chubanshe) pages 192–226.
- 1977. With Bai Bin. "Mingdai Xixiawen jingjuan he shichuang chutan" 明代西夏文經卷和石幢初探 [Preliminary investigations into Ming dynasty Tangut sutras and stone dhanari columns revisited]; Kaogu Xuebao 1977.1: 143–164.
- 1974. "Gansu Wuwei faxian de Xixiawen kaoshi zhiyi" 甘肅武威發現的西夏文考釋質疑 [Questions on the research on Tangut documents discovered in Wuwei in Gansu]; Kaogu June 1974: 394–397.
