= Luo Zhenyu =

Qing Dynasty scholar (1866–1940)

Luo Zhenyu 羅振玉
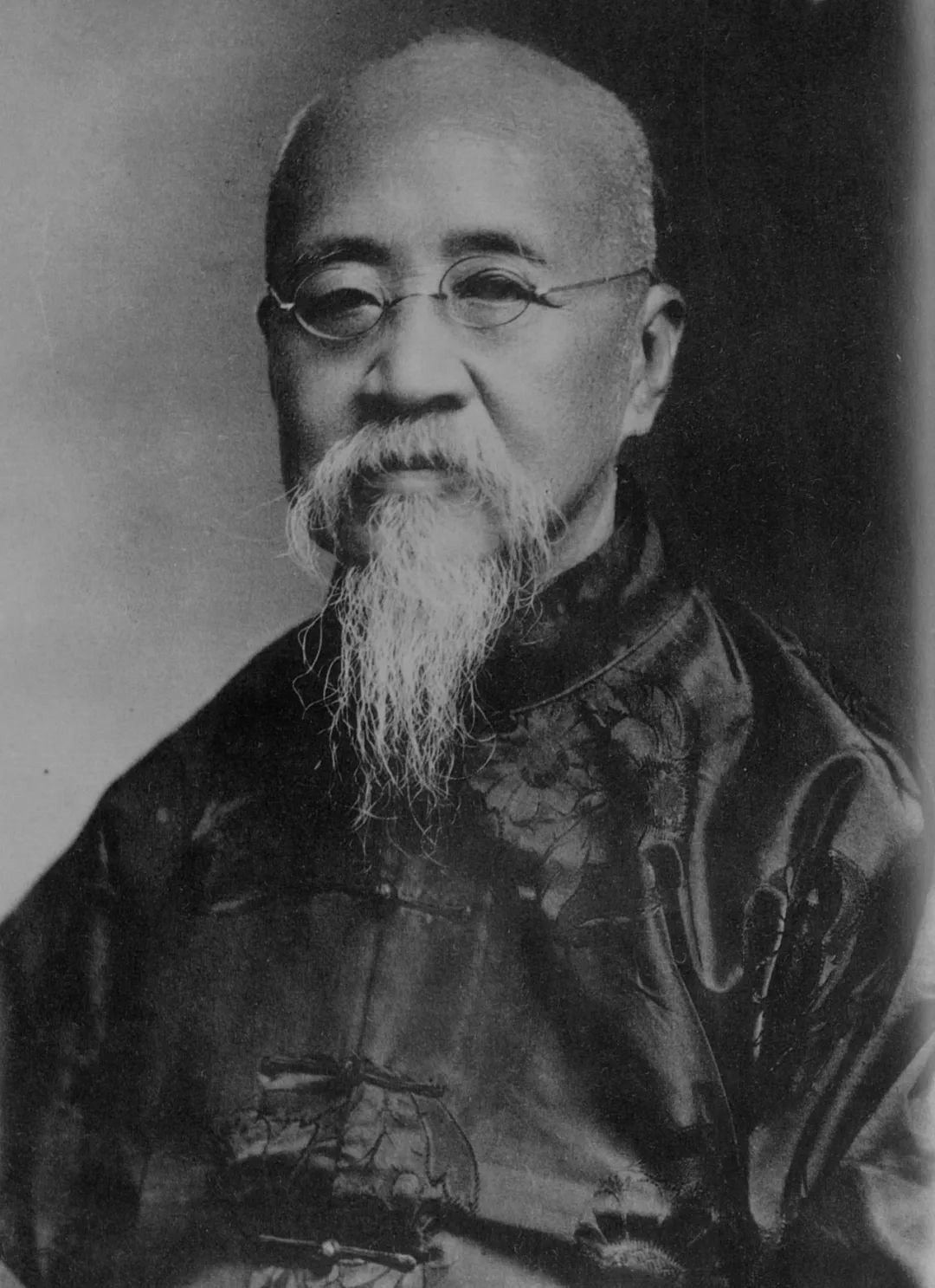
- Luo Zhenyu
- Born: 8 August 1866; Huai'an, Jiangsu, Qing China
- Died: 14 May 1940 (aged 73); Dalian, Kwantung Leased Territory
- Citizenship: China, Manchukuo

Luo Zhenyu
- Chinese: 罗振玉
- Traditional Chinese: 羅振玉
Transcriptions
Standard Mandarin
- Hanyu Pinyin: Luó Zhènyù
- Wade–Giles: Lo Chen-yü

Luo Zhenyu, also Romanized as Lo Chen-yü (simplified Chinese: 罗振玉; traditional Chinese: 羅振玉; pinyin: Luó Zhènyù; Wade–Giles: Lo Chen-yü; August 8, 1866 – May 14, 1940), courtesy name Shuyun (simplified Chinese: 叔蕴; traditional Chinese: 叔蘊; pinyin: Shūyùn), was a Chinese classical scholar, philologist, epigrapher, antiquarian and Qing loyalist.

== Biography ==
A native of Huai'an, Luo began to publish works of agriculture in Shanghai after the First Sino-Japanese War. With his friends, he set up Dongwen Xueshe (東文學社), a Japanese language teaching school in 1896. One of the students was Wang Guowei.

Luo first visited Japan in 1901 to study the Japanese educational system. From 1906 onwards, he held several different government posts, mostly related to agriculture. From April 1909 to February 1912 he was president of the Imperial Agricultural College. Being a loyalist to the Qing Dynasty, he fled to Japan after the Xinhai Revolution, residing in Kyoto and doing some research on Chinese archaeology. He returned to Tianjin in China in 1919, taking part in political activities aimed at restoration of deposed Qing Emperor Puyi. Luo eventually rose to become one of the three main advisors and a trusted confidant of the emperor.

After the creation of the Japanese puppet state of Manchukuo in March 1932, Luo was appointed to its privy council. He insisted on making Manchukuo a monarchy against various proposals to make it a republic. He was made president of the Supervisory Council in July 1933. He also founded and served as chairman of the Manchukuo-Japan Cultural Society from 1934. Luo gradually became disillusioned with the heavy-handed administration of the Japanese Kwantung Army and the lack of all real authority or political power by Emperor Puyi, and retired to Dalian in 1937.

Luo's political activities during the wartime period and association with the collaborationist Manchukuo government have tended to overshadow his accomplishments as a scholar. He worked throughout his life to preserve Chinese antiques, especially oracle bones, bamboo and wooden slips, and Dunhuang manuscripts, all of which are invaluable materials for understanding ancient China. He was one of the first scholars to decipher the oracle bone script, and produced many important scholarly works researching the bronzeware script. He helped publish Liu E's Tieyun Canggui (鐵雲藏龜), the first collection of oracle bones, and Sun Yirang's Qiwen Juli (契文舉例), the first work of decipherment of the oracle bone script. Luo's own work Yinxu Shuqi Kaoshi (殷虛書契考釋) still occupies an important place in the study of oracle bone script.

He was also the first modern scholar to become interested in the Tangut script, and published a number of dissertations on the subject in 1912 and 1927.
