= The General's Garden (Tangut translation) =

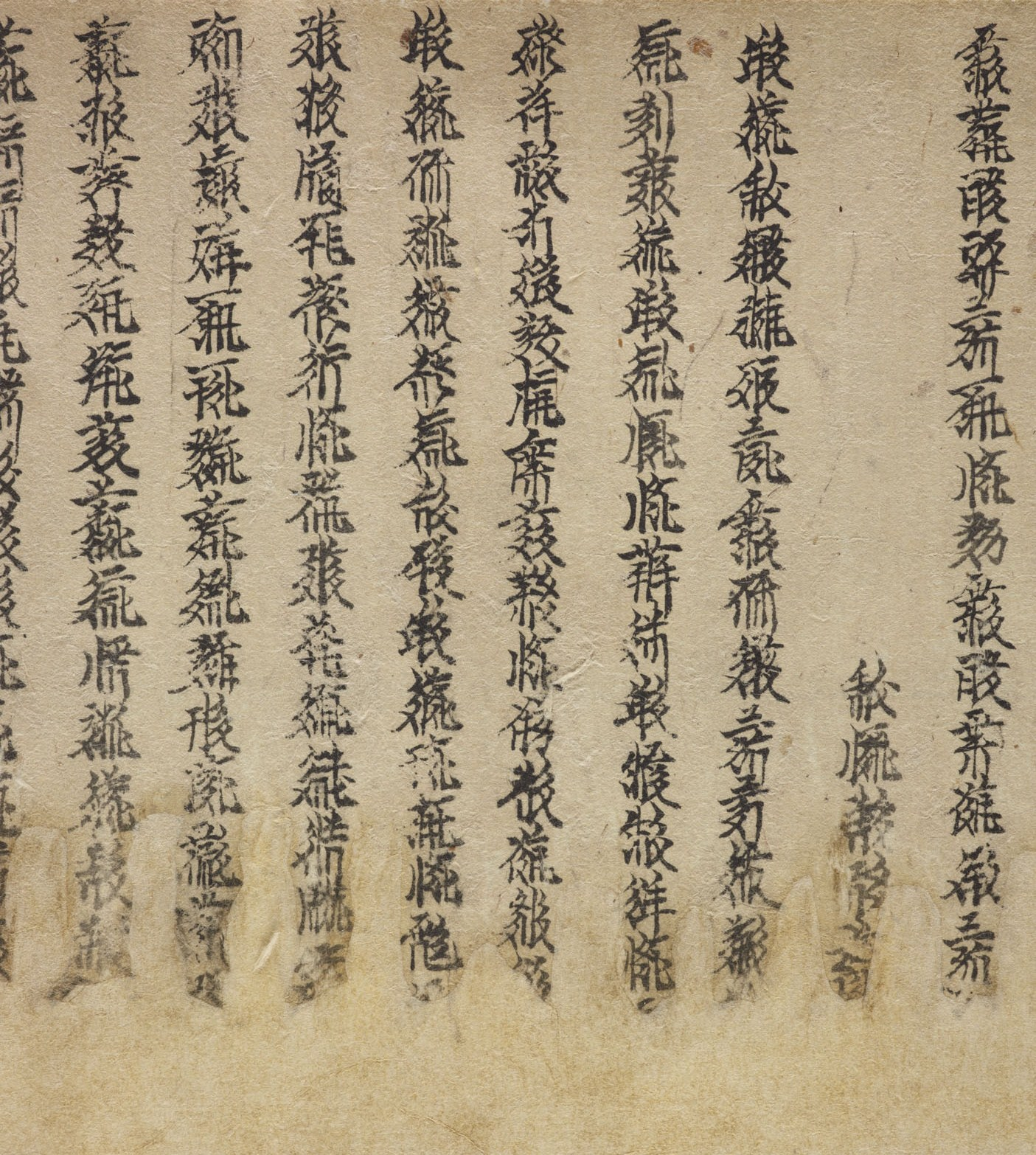
Start of Section 37 of the manuscript scroll of the Tangut translation of the General's Garden (British Library Or.12380/1840).

The Tangut translation of The General's Garden (Tangut: 𘒏𗩈𗛝𘊳𗺉 Gia¹-bju̱² Lhejr²-bo¹ Tśhji² (Note: The Tangut readings are taken from Li Fanwen's Tangut-Chinese Dictionary (Beijing: China Academy of Social Sciences Press, 2008), where they are character numbers 1531, 2805, 4246, 3890, and 4018. The Tangut title is literally the Book of the General's Grove, where the Tangut word for "grove" is equivalent to the Chinese word 苑 yuàn, which is commonly translated in English as "garden", but can also mean "grove".)) is a unique manuscript translation in the Tangut language and script of a Chinese military text, The General's Garden (Chinese: 將苑; pinyin: Jiàng Yuàn). The manuscript was collected from the abandoned fortress city of Khara-Khoto by Aurel Stein in 1914, and is held at the British Library in London, where it is catalogued as Or.12380/1840. The translation dates to the 12th or early 13th century, and predates any of the extant Chinese editions by some two hundred years. The Tangut text may therefore represent a version that is closer to the original Chinese text than the extant Ming dynasty (1368–1644) Chinese editions.

== Description of the manuscript ==
The manuscript is a paper scroll. When found by Stein it was twisted up, but has since been mounted on backing paper as a scroll, 230 cm long and 20 cm high. The beginning of the scroll, comprising about a half of the text, is missing, but the end is intact. Additionally, the bottom of the scroll along its entire length has been severely damaged (apparently torn off), with the result that each column of Tangut text is missing a few characters at the bottom. There are a total of 115 surviving columns of text, each column comprising between 4 and 18 Tangut characters, depending upon the level of damage. Imre Galambos estimates that the undamaged manuscript would have had twenty characters per column.

The Tangut characters are written in an elegant calligraphy in standard (non-cursive) character forms. Red marks and editorial signs are used to indicate copying errors such as reversed characters or characters that should be deleted.

== Contents of the manuscript ==
The surviving text of the manuscript is divided into 18 sections, with the title and number of each section given at the bottom of the first column of each section. However, as the bottom of the manuscript is damaged, the section titles and numbers are missing or incomplete in most cases. Fortunately, the section numbers for the last few sections can be made out, from which it can be inferred that the complete Tangut text comprised thirty-seven sections numbered one through 37. This contrasts with the Ming editions of the Chinese text, which comprise fifty sections. Only the last 18 sections of the Tangut manuscript have survived, corresponding to sections 21–23, 26–29, 32, 34–36, 38–40, 42–43, 45, and 46/50 of the Chinese version (sections 46 and 50 are merged into a single section, with the intervening sections omitted). Thus the missing first half of the Tangut text must have comprised 19 sections corresponding to sections 1-21 of the Chinese version. Whereas the missing first half of the Tangut text seems to have been close to the Chinese version (apparently only omitting one section), the surviving second half omits eleven sections, and in particular the final five sections relating to "barbarians" are reduced to a single section discussing the "Northern barabarians" only.

Tangut Section	Lines	Corresponding Chinese Section	Chinese Title
20	1–2	21	Waiting Patiently (謹候)
21	2–6	22	Forming Opportunities (機形)
22	7–11	23	Heavy Punishment (重刑)
23	12–17	26	Power of Soldiers (兵勢)
24	18–23	27	Victory and Defeat (勝敗)
25	24–32	28	Utilizing Authority (假權)
26	33–37	29	Mourning the Dead (哀死)
27	38–42	32	Taking Advantage (便利)
28	43–48	34	Assessing Abilities (揣能)
29	49–53	35	Making Light of Battle (輕戰)
30	54–59	36	Power of Terrain (地勢)
31	60–70	38	Power of Attack (擊勢)
32	71–76	39	Orderly Troops (整師)
33	77–80	40	Encouraging Warriors (厲士)
34	81–91	42	The Ways of Battle (戰道)
35	92–96	43	Harmonizing People (和人)
36	97–99	45	Conduct of the General (將情)
37	100–114	46 & 50	Awe-Inspiring Commands (威令) and Northern Di (北狄)

The final line of the manuscript states "End of the Book of the General's Grove", and notes that it has been collated or proofed, thereby indicating that there are no missing sections after last section of Tangut text in the manuscript. The title of the Ming dynasty Chinese editions of the General's Garden is the Book of the Heart (Chinese: 心書; pinyin: Xīn Shū) or the New Book (Chinese: 新書; pinyin: Xīn Shū), and the title General's Garden (Chinese: 將苑; pinyin: Jiàng Yuàn) is only recorded for lost Song dynasty editions, so the fact that the Tangut title translates as "General's Grove" (equivalent to the Chinese title translated in English as "General's Garden") can be seen as evidence that the original text was called the General's Garden rather than the Book of the Heart or the New Book.

== Significance ==
As the vast majority of surviving texts in the Tangut language are Buddhist in nature, the General's Garden is important as one of a relatively small number of secular Tangut texts. However, it is not the only Tangut translation of a Chinese military text. Tangut translations of Sun Tzu's Art of War (Chinese: 孫子兵法; pinyin: Sūnzǐ Bīngfǎ) with three commentaries, the Six Secret Teachings (Chinese: 六韬; pinyin: Liùtāo), and the Three Strategies of Huang Shigong (Chinese: 黄石公三略; pinyin: Huáng Shígōng Sān Lǜe) are also preserved in the collections of the Institute of Oriental Manuscripts in Saint Petersburg. These three Tangut translations all exist in printed editions, and were probably published during the second half of the 12th century as part of a state-sponsored translation and publishing project, which indicates the important position that military treatises were held in by the Tangut state.

In contrast to the printed editions of the Tangut translations of the three military classics, the Tangut version of the General's Garden only exists in manuscript form. That it was not published as a printed edition probably reflects the lower status of the General's Garden as a military text, but at the same time, the fact that Tangut scholars were translating minor military texts such as the General's Garden indicates the importance that was given to military texts in general.

The General's Garden is considered to be a Song dynasty (960–1279) forgery incorporating elements of Sun Tzu's Art of War and other earlier military treatises. For this reason there are few surviving editions of the Chinese version of the General's Garden, and the earliest known edition dates to the early Ming dynasty (1368–1644), at least a hundred years after it was written. The Tangut manuscript probably dates to the second half of the 12th century or the early 13th century, and as such it predates the earliest Chinese edition by about two hundred years, and so may more closely reflect the original form of the text than the existing Chinese editions.

The Tangut translation differs from the Chinese version in two important respects. Firstly, the Tangut translation comprises 37 sections, whereas the earliest Chinese version of the text comprises fifty sections. It is not certain whether this difference is due to the Song dynasty source for the translation having fewer sections than the later version of the text, or whether the Tangut translator deliberately omitted sections that were not considered relevant to the situation of the Western Xia. The other major difference is the treatment of the final four sections of the text, relating to the "barbarians" of the north (Beidi), south (Nanman), east (Dongyi) and west (Xirong), which China traditionally saw itself as being surrounded by. The Tangut translation only discusses the "Lords of the Steppes" in the north, and omits any description of the barbarians of the south, east and west. Galambos sees this as a deliberate change so that the text reflects the geopolitical situation of the Western Xia state rather than the Chinese state. Ksenia Kepping suggests that the "Lords of the Steppes" mentioned in the Tangut translation refers to the Mongols who mounted raids on the Western Xia from 1205 onwards. On the other hand, Galambos notes that the "Lords of the Steppes" could equally have been intended to refer to other nomadic peoples living in the grasslands to the north of the Western Xia state, such as the Khitans and Jurchens.

Kepping and Galambos have analysed some phrases that are common to several different Chinese military treatises that were translated into Tangut, including the General's Garden, and they note that the Tangut translations of the same Chinese phrases vary considerably. This shows that terminology and names were translated ad hoc by translators as they came across them, and that there was no attempt to maintain any consistency between translations. This is in marked contrast with Tangut translations of Buddhist texts, which were done in a very methodical and literal manner.

== See also ==
- Auspicious Tantra of All-Reaching Union — a Tangut translation of a Buddhist text
