= Yevgeny Kychanov =

Soviet-Russian orientalist (1932–2013)

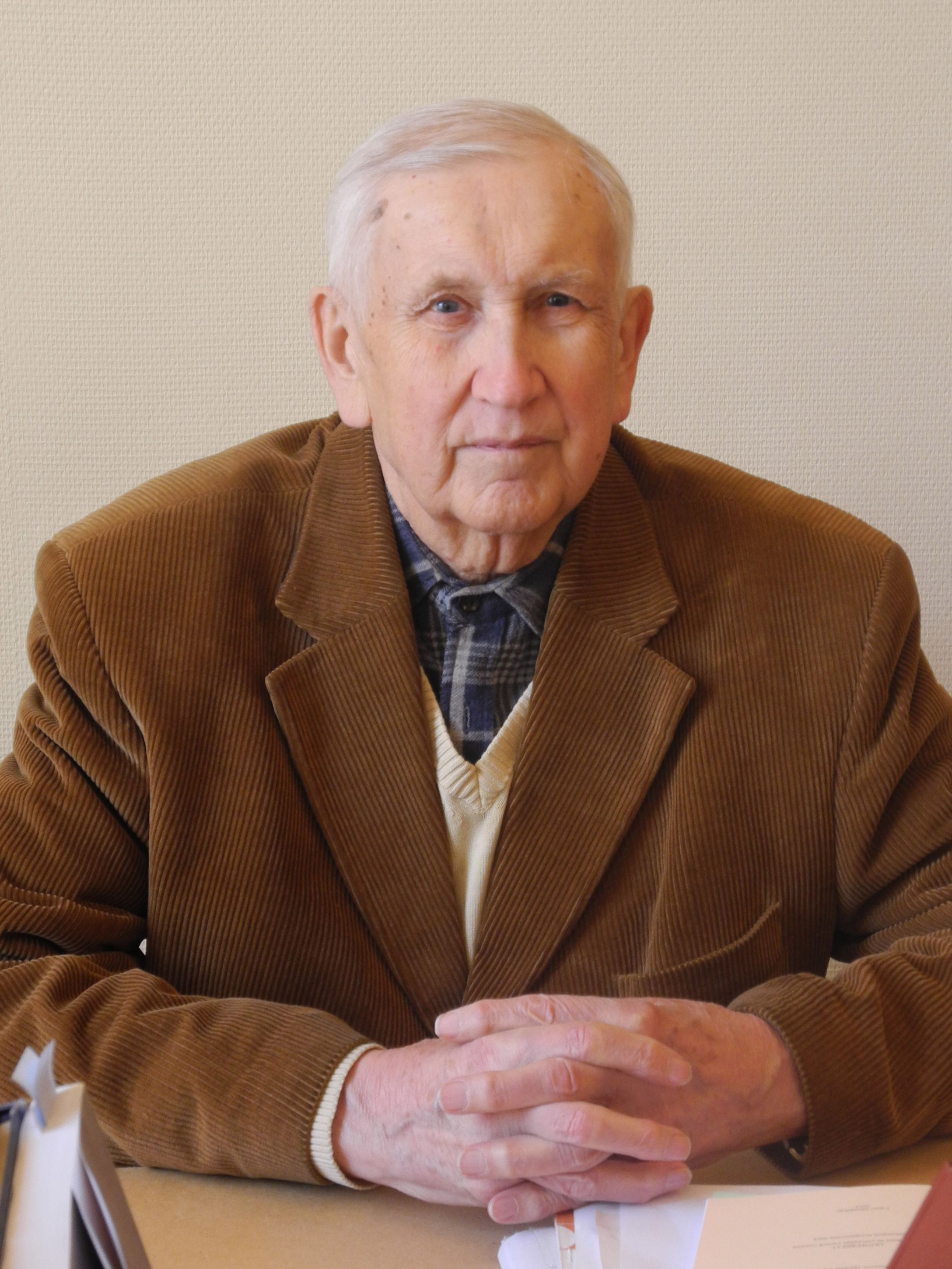
Professor Kychanov in his office, October 2012

Evgenij Ivanovich Kychanov (Russian: Евгений Иванович Кычанов; also transcribed as Yevgeny (Evgenij) Ivanovich Kychanov, 22 June 1932 – 24 May 2013) was a Soviet-Russian orientalist, an expert on the Tangut people and their mediaeval Xi Xia Empire. From 1997 to 2003 he served as the director of the Saint Petersburg Branch of the Institute of Oriental Studies of the Russian Academy of Sciences (now the Institute of Oriental Manuscripts of the Russian Academy of Sciences).

== Biography ==
Evgenij Kychanov was born 22 June 1932 in Sarapul, Udmurtia.

Evgenij Kychanov graduated from the Oriental Department of Saint Petersburg University (known at the time as Leningrad University) in 1955, majoring in the history of China. He did his graduate work at the Leningrad Branch of the Institute of Oriental Studies, and in 1960 he defended his PhD thesis on the Western Xia (Tangut Empire). He has been working at that institute ever since, spending many years as the head of the Tangut research group, and, later, as the head of larger units. From 1997 to 2003 he was director of the St Petersburg Branch (now the Institute of Oriental Manuscripts).

Kychanov is the author of around 300 articles and books on the history and culture of peoples of China and Inner Asia, including a number of pioneering research papers on the Xi Xia state and translations from the Tangut language, summarizing works on the history of Tibet and nomadic civilizations of Inner Asia, as well as popular books about Tibet, Genghis Khan and other steppe leaders.

In May 2011 Kychanov was awarded the S. F. Oldenburg Award in recognition of his achievements in the field of Central Asian studies, in particular his role in the decipherment of the Tangut script.

In June 2012 a conference in his honour, entitled The Tanguts in Central Asia, was held at the Institute of Oriental Manuscripts to mark Kychanov's 80th birthday. A collection of 34 papers written by scholars from Russia, China, Japan and other countries was published as a Festschrift with the same title.

He died in Saint Petersburg in May 2013.

== Works ==
- Translations
  - 1968. “Gimn svjaschennim predkam tangutov. (Hymn to the sacred Tangut ancestors).” Pis’mennye pamjatniki Vostoka, pp. 217–231.
  - 1971. “Tangutskij document 1105g. ” Pis’mennye pamjatniki Vostoka, pp. 193–203.
  - 1971. “A Tangut Document of 1224 from Khara-Khoto. ” Acta Orientalia Academiae Scientiarum Hungaricae 24.2: 189–201.
  - 1987–1988. Izmenennyi i zanovo utverzhdennyi kodeks deviza charstvovanija nebesnoe protsvetanie. 4 vols. Moskva.
  - (1974) Вновь собранные драгоценные парные изречения. / Пер. с тангут. и комм. Е. И. Кычанова. (Серия «Памятники письменности Востока»). М., Наука, 1974. (Vnov’sobrannye dragotsennye parnye izrechenija. Moskva 1974 / Recollected precious pair sayings. Translation from the Tangut. Moscow 1974)
  - (1987–1989) Измененный и заново утвержденный кодекс девиза царствования Небесное процветание (1149—1169). Изд. текста, пер., иссл. и прим. Е. И. Кычанова. Кн. 1—4. М.
  - Запись у алтаря о примирении Конфуция. (Серия «Памятники письменности Востока»). М., Восточная литература, 2000 г. 152 стр. ISBN 5-02-018066-1
- Historical Studies
  - (1960) Государство Си Ся (982—1227). Автореф.дисс. … к.и.н. Л..
  - (1963) Софронов М. В., Кычанов Е. И. Исследования по фонетике тангутского языка. (Предварительные результаты). М., ИВЛ.
  - (1968) Очерк истории тангутского государства. М., Наука, 1968. (Ocherk istorii tangutskogo gosudarstva. Moskva, 1968 / A historical sketch of the Tangut state. Moscow, 1968)
  - (1986) Основы средневекового китайского права (7–13 вв.). М., Наука (ГРВЛ).
  - 2000 “The State and the Buddhist Sangha： Xixia State （982–1227）.” The Journal of Oriental Studies (Tokyo) 10: 119–128
- Popular and scientific articles
  - Звучат лишь письмена. (Серия «По следам исчезнувших культур Востока»). М., Наука. 1965. 139 стр.
  - Жизнь Темучжина, думавшего покорить мир: Чингис-хан: личность и эпоха. М., Наука. 1973. 144 стр. 15000 экз. 2-е изд. Бишкек, 1991. 286 стр. 20000 экз. М., Вост.лит. 1995. 271 стр. 20000 экз.
  - Кычанов Е. И., Савицкий Л. С. Люди и боги Страны снегов. Очерк истории Тибета и его культуры. Серия: Культура народов Востока. Главная редакция восточной литературы издательства «Наука», 1975 г. 304 стр. Тираж: 10000 экз. (переиздание: Петербургское Востоковедение, 2006 г. ISBN 5-85803-325-3)
  - Громковская Л. Л. (Лидия Львовна), Кычанов Е. И. Николай Александрович Невский. (Серия «Русские востоковеды и путешественники»). М., Наука (ГРВЛ). 1978. 216 стр. 10000 экз.
  - Повествование об ойратском Галдане Бошокту-Хане. Новосибирск, Наука, 1980. 192 стр. Тираж: 24700 экз.
  - Абахай. Новосибирск, Наука. 1986. 147 стр. 40000 экз.
  - Император великого Ся. (Серия "Страны и народы мира"). Новосибирск, Наука, 1991 г. 160 стр. ISBN 5-02-029403-9 Тираж: 74000 экз.
  - Кочевые государства от гуннов до маньчжуров. М., Издательская фирма «Восточная литература» РАН. 1997.
  - Властители Азии. М., Восточная литература. 2004. 632 стр. ISBN 5-02-018328-8 Тираж: 1200 экз.

=== Other works ===
- 1989. “獻給西夏文字創造者的頌詩 Xiangei Xixia wenzi chuangzaozhe de songshi”. 中國民族史研究 Zhongguo minzushi yanjiu 2: 144–155.
- 2006. With Arakawa Shintarō. Словарь тангутского (Си Ся) языка: тангутско-русско-англо-китайский словарь [Tangut-Russian-English-Chinese Dictionary]. Kyoto: Faculty of Letters, Tokyo University.
