= Ideographic Symbols and Punctuation =

- Range: U+16FE0..U+16FFF (32 code points)
- Plane: SMP
- Scripts: Han (9 char.); Khitan small script (1 char.); Nüshu (1 char.); Tangut (1 char.)
- Assigned: 12 code points
- Unused: 20 reserved code points

Unicode version history
- 9.0 (2016): 1 (+1)
- 10.0 (2017): 2 (+1)
- 12.0 (2019): 4 (+2)
- 13.0 (2020): 7 (+3)
- 17.0 (2025): 12 (+5)

Unicode documentation
- Code chart ∣ Web page

Ideographic Symbols and Punctuation is a Unicode block containing symbols and punctuation marks used by ideographic scripts such as Tangut and Nüshu, in addition to punctuation marks, symbols, diacritics and modifier letters supplementing those in the CJK Symbols and Punctuation block.

Ideographic Symbols and Punctuation^{[1]}^{[2]} Official Unicode Consortium code chart (PDF)
	0	1	2	3	4	5	6	7	8	9	A	B	C	D	E	F
U+16FEx	𖿠	𖿡	𖿢	𖿣	KSS; F											
U+16FFx	𖿰	𖿱	𖿲	𖿳	𖿴	𖿵	𖿶									
Notes: 1. As of Unicode version 17.0; 2. Grey areas indicate non-assigned code points

== History ==
The following Unicode-related documents record the purpose and process of defining specific characters in the Ideographic Symbols and Punctuation block:

Version	Final code points (Note: Proposed code points and characters names may differ from final code points and names)	Count	L2 ID	WG2 ID	Document
9.0	U+16FE0	1	L2/10-095	N3797, N3797-A, N3797-B	Final proposal for encoding the Tangut script in the SMP of the UCS, 2010-04-05
9.0	U+16FE0	1	L2/10-131	N3821	Anderson, Deborah; Cook, Richard (2010-04-16), Comments on Tangut proposal N3797
9.0	U+16FE0	1	L2/11-214	N4033, N4033A, N4033B	West, Andrew (2011-05-22), Report on Tangut Encoding
9.0	U+16FE0	1	L2/12-313	N4325	West, Andrew; et al. (2012-10-02), Proposal to encode the Tangut script in the UCS
9.0	U+16FE0	1	L2/14-023	N4522	West, Andrew; Everson, Michael; Xiaomang, Han; Jia, Changye; Jing, Yongshi; Zaytsev, Viacheslav (2014-01-21), Proposal to encode the Tangut script in the UCS
9.0	U+16FE0	1	L2/14-100		Moore, Lisa (2014-05-13), "Consensus 139-C14", UTC #139 Minutes
9.0	U+16FE0	1		N4553 (pdf, doc)	Umamaheswaran, V. S. (2014-09-16), "M62.12b", Minutes of WG 2 meeting 62 Adobe, San Jose, CA, USA
9.0	U+16FE0	1	L2/16-129		Anderson, Deborah; Whistler, Ken (2016-05-05), Name change for U+16FE0
9.0	U+16FE0	1	L2/16-121		Moore, Lisa (2016-05-20), "Consensus 147-C20", UTC #147 Minutes, "Change the name of U+16FE0 from TANGUT REPETITION MARK to TANGUT ITERATION MARK for Unicode 9.0."
10.0	U+16FE1	1	L2/09-170	N3635 (pdf, doc)	Ad hoc report on Nüshu, 2009-04-21
10.0	U+16FE1	1	L2/09-234	N3603 (pdf, doc)	Umamaheswaran, V. S. (2009-07-08), "M54.18", Unconfirmed minutes of WG 2 meeting 54
10.0	U+16FE1	1	L2/12-362	N4341	Updated Proposal for encoding Nyushu in the SMP, 2012-09-10
10.0	U+16FE1	1	L2/12-370	N4376	Aalto, Tero (2012-10-24), Nüshu ad hoc report
10.0	U+16FE1	1		N4451	Anderson, Deborah (2013-06-05), Mapping of Nushu characters (from N4376 and N4341) and Additional Comments
10.0	U+16FE1	1	L2/16-052	N4603 (pdf, doc)	Umamaheswaran, V. S. (2015-09-01), "M63.03f", Unconfirmed minutes of WG 2 meeting 63, "Rename 1B100 to NUSHU ITERATION MARK and move it to 16FE1 in Ideographic Symbols and Punctuation block"
10.0	U+16FE1	1	L2/16-203		Moore, Lisa (2016-08-18), "B.11.3.2", UTC #148 Minutes
12.0	U+16FE2..16FE3	2	L2/17-310	N4847	West, Andrew; Chan, Eiso (2017-09-07), Proposal to encode two marks for ancient Chinese texts
12.0	U+16FE2..16FE3	2	L2/17-367	N4885	Anderson, Deborah; Whistler, Ken; Pournader, Roozbeh; Moore, Lisa (2017-09-18), "4. Iteration/Punctuation marks", Comments on WG2 #66 (Sept. 2017) documents
12.0	U+16FE2..16FE3	2		N4953 (pdf, doc)	"M66.16h", Unconfirmed minutes of WG 2 meeting 66, 2018-03-23
12.0	U+16FE2..16FE3	2	L2/17-362		Moore, Lisa (2018-02-02), "Consensus 153-C11", UTC #153 Minutes
13.0	U+16FE4	1	L2/18-121R	N4943R	West, Andrew; Zaytsev, Viacheslav; Everson, Michael (2018-05-19), Cluster Formation Model for Khitan Small Script
13.0	U+16FE4	1	L2/18-210	N4977	Anderson, Deborah; Whistler, Ken; Pournader, Roozbeh; Glass, Andrew; Constable, Peter; Moore, Lisa; Jeziorek, Marek; Yang, Ben (2018-06-09), "1", Comments on WG2 #67 documents (June 2018)
13.0	U+16FE4	1	L2/18-213	N5002	Anderson, Deborah; Constable, Peter (2018-06-20), Khitan Small Script Ad Hoc Report (London)
13.0	U+16FE4	1	L2/18-214		Silva, Eduardo Marín (2018-06-27), "KHITAN SMALL SCRIPT FILLER", Feedback on: Additional repertoire for ISO/IEC 10646:2017 (5th ed.) beyond Amendment 2 (L2/18-211)
13.0	U+16FE4	1	L2/18-241		Anderson, Deborah; et al. (2018-07-20), "9", Recommendations to UTC # 156 July 2018 on Script Proposals
13.0	U+16FE4	1	L2/18-300		Anderson, Deborah; et al. (2018-09-14), "9. b.", Recommendations to UTC #157 on Script Proposals
13.0	U+16FE4	1	L2/18-272		Moore, Lisa (2018-10-29), "C.10", UTC #157 Minutes
13.0	U+16FE4	1	L2/18-183		Moore, Lisa (2018-11-20), "C.12 Cluster Formation Model for Khitan Small Script", UTC #156 Minutes
13.0	U+16FE4	1		N5020 (pdf, doc)	Umamaheswaran, V. S. (2019-01-11), "9.2.3", Unconfirmed minutes of WG 2 meeting 67
13.0	U+16FF0..16FF1	2	L2/17-373R	N4915	Collins, Lee; Nhàn, Ngô Thanh (2017-11-06), Proposal to Encode Two Vietnamese Alternate Reading Marks
13.0	U+16FF0..16FF1	2	L2/17-362		Moore, Lisa (2018-02-02), "Consensus 153-C20", UTC #153 Minutes
13.0	U+16FF0..16FF1	2	L2/18-281	N5011	West, Andrew; Knightley, John; Chan, Eiso (2018-08-31), Comments on proposed Vietnamese Reading Marks
13.0	U+16FF0..16FF1	2	L2/18-318	N5026	Collins, Lee; Nhàn, Ngô Thanh (2018-10-20), Response to L2/18-281 (Comments on proposed Vietnamese Reading Marks)
13.0	U+16FF0..16FF1	2	L2/18-272		Moore, Lisa (2018-10-29), "C.6", UTC #157 Minutes
13.0	U+16FF0..16FF1	2		N5020 (pdf, doc)	Umamaheswaran, V. S. (2019-01-11), "9.1.1", Unconfirmed minutes of WG 2 meeting 67
17.0	U+16FF2..16FF3	2	L2/16-109	N4720	West, Andrew; Chan, Eiso (2016-04-21), Proposal to define Standardized Variation Sequences for two Chinese ideographs
17.0	U+16FF2..16FF3	2	L2/16-121		Moore, Lisa (2016-05-20), "B.15.3", UTC #147 Minutes
17.0	U+16FF2..16FF3	2	L2/23-284		West, Andrew; Chan, Eiso (2023-12-12), Proposal to encode two small form CJK characters for Chinese
17.0	U+16FF2..16FF3	2	L2/24-012		Lunde, Ken (2024-01-11), "21", CJK & Unihan Group Recommendations for UTC #178 Meeting
17.0	U+16FF2..16FF3	2	L2/24-006		Constable, Peter (2024-01-31), "Consensus 178-C27", UTC #178 Minutes
17.0	U+16FF4..16FF6	3	L2/24-071		Chan, Eiso (2024-03-11), Proposal to encode three stable extended Suzhou Numeral-like letters for Cantonese Music
17.0	U+16FF4..16FF6	3	L2/24-071R		Chan, Eiso (2024-04-07), Proposal to encode three stable extended Suzhou Numeral-like letters for Cantonese Music
17.0	U+16FF4..16FF6	3	L2/24-067		Lunde, Ken (2024-04-19), "38", CJK & Unihan Working Group Recommendations for UTC #179 Meeting
17.0	U+16FF4..16FF6	3	L2/24-071R2		Chan, Eiso (2024-04-24), Proposal to encode three stable extended Suzhou Numeral-like letters for Cantonese Music
17.0	U+16FF4..16FF6	3	L2/24-061		Constable, Peter (2024-04-29), "Consensus 179-C44", UTC #179 Minutes, "Accept the proposal to provisionally assign U+16FF4 YANGQIN SIGN SLOW TWO, U+16FF5 YANGQIN SIGN SLOW THREE, and U+16FF6 YANGQIN SIGN SLOW FOUR"
17.0	U+16FF4..16FF6	3	L2/24-071R3		Chan, Eiso (2024-06-03), Proposal to encode three stable extended Suzhou Numeral-like letters for Cantonese Music
17.0	U+16FF4..16FF6	3	L2/24-165		Lunde, Ken (2024-07-11), "12", CJK & Unihan Working Group Recommendations for UTC #180 Meeting
17.0	U+16FF4..16FF6	3	L2/24-162		Scherer, Markus; Hadley, Josh (2024-07-16), UTC #180 properties feedback & recommendations
17.0	U+16FF4..16FF6	3	L2/24-166		Anderson, Deborah; Goregaokar, Manish; Kučera, Jan; Whistler, Ken; Pournader, Roozbeh; Constable, Peter (2024-07-18), "5. Ideographic Symbols and Punctuation", Recommendations to UTC #180 July 2024 on Script Proposals

== See also ==
- CJK Unified Ideographs
- CJK Symbols and Punctuation
- Khitan Small Script (Unicode block)
- Nushu (Unicode block)
- Tangut (Unicode block)
- Tangut Components (Unicode block)
- Tangut Components Supplement (Unicode block)
- Tangut Supplement (Unicode block)
