= Tangut Components Supplement =

- Range: U+18D80..U+18DFF (128 code points)
- Plane: SMP
- Scripts: Tangut
- Assigned: 115 code points
- Unused: 13 reserved code points

Unicode version history
- 17.0 (2025): 115 (+115)

Unicode documentation
- Code chart ∣ Web page

Tangut Components Supplement is a Unicode block containing additional components used in the study of the Tangut script. It is a supplement to the main Tangut Components block.

== Block ==
Tangut Components Supplement^{[1]}^{[2]} Official Unicode Consortium code chart (PDF)
	0	1	2	3	4	5	6	7	8	9	A	B	C	D	E	F
U+18D8x	𘶀	𘶁	𘶂	𘶃	𘶄	𘶅	𘶆	𘶇	𘶈	𘶉	𘶊	𘶋	𘶌	𘶍	𘶎	𘶏
U+18D9x	𘶐	𘶑	𘶒	𘶓	𘶔	𘶕	𘶖	𘶗	𘶘	𘶙	𘶚	𘶛	𘶜	𘶝	𘶞	𘶟
U+18DAx	𘶠	𘶡	𘶢	𘶣	𘶤	𘶥	𘶦	𘶧	𘶨	𘶩	𘶪	𘶫	𘶬	𘶭	𘶮	𘶯
U+18DBx	𘶰	𘶱	𘶲	𘶳	𘶴	𘶵	𘶶	𘶷	𘶸	𘶹	𘶺	𘶻	𘶼	𘶽	𘶾	𘶿
U+18DCx	𘷀	𘷁	𘷂	𘷃	𘷄	𘷅	𘷆	𘷇	𘷈	𘷉	𘷊	𘷋	𘷌	𘷍	𘷎	𘷏
U+18DDx	𘷐	𘷑	𘷒	𘷓	𘷔	𘷕	𘷖	𘷗	𘷘	𘷙	𘷚	𘷛	𘷜	𘷝	𘷞	𘷟
U+18DEx	𘷠	𘷡	𘷢	𘷣	𘷤	𘷥	𘷦	𘷧	𘷨	𘷩	𘷪	𘷫	𘷬	𘷭	𘷮	𘷯
U+18DFx	𘷰	𘷱	𘷲													
Notes: 1. As of Unicode version 17.0; 2. Grey areas indicate non-assigned code points

== History ==
The following Unicode-related documents record the purpose and process of defining specific characters in the Tangut Components Supplement block:

Version	Final code points (Note: Proposed code points and characters names may differ from final code points and names)	Count	L2 ID	WG2 ID	Document
17.0	U+18D80..18D81	2	L2/23-149	N5217	West, Andrew (2023-05-31), Proposal to encode 2 Tangut components and 29 Tangut ideographs
17.0	U+18D80..18D81	2	L2/23-164		Anderson, Deborah; Kučera, Jan; Whistler, Ken; Pournader, Roozbeh; Constable, Peter (2023-07-21), "5 Tangut", Recommendations to UTC #176 July 2023 on Script Proposals
17.0	U+18D80..18D81	2	L2/23-246	N5217R	West, Andrew (2023-10-02), Proposal to encode 2 Tangut components and 28 Tangut ideographs
17.0	U+18D80..18D81	2	L2/23-238R		Anderson, Deborah; Kučera, Jan; Whistler, Ken; Pournader, Roozbeh; Constable, Peter (2023-11-01), "5c Two Tangut Components and 28 Tangut Ideographs", Recommendations to UTC #177 November 2023 on Script Proposals
17.0	U+18D80..18D81	2	L2/23-231		Constable, Peter (2023-12-08), "Consensus 177-C28", UTC #177 Minutes
17.0	U+18D82..18DF2	113	L2/23-150	N5218	West, Andrew (2023-05-31), Proposal to encode 114 Tangut components
17.0	U+18D82..18DF2	113	L2/23-164		Anderson, Deborah; Kučera, Jan; Whistler, Ken; Pournader, Roozbeh; Constable, Peter (2023-07-21), "5 Tangut", Recommendations to UTC #176 July 2023 on Script Proposals
17.0	U+18D82..18DF2	113	L2/23-247	N5218R2	West, Andrew (2023-10-02), Proposal to encode 114 Tangut components
17.0	U+18D82..18DF2	113	L2/23-238R		Anderson, Deborah; Kučera, Jan; Whistler, Ken; Pournader, Roozbeh; Constable, Peter (2023-11-01), "5b 114 Tangut Components", Recommendations to UTC #177 November 2023 on Script Proposals
17.0	U+18D82..18DF2	113	L2/23-231		Constable, Peter (2023-12-08), "Consensus 177-C27", UTC #177 Minutes
17.0	U+18D82..18DF2	113	L2/24-048	N5276	West, Andrew (2024-01-29), Review of Proposal to encode 114 Tangut components
17.0	U+18D82..18DF2	113	L2/24-068		Anderson, Deborah; Goregaokar, Manish; Kučera, Jan; Whistler, Ken; Pournader, Roozbeh; Constable, Peter (2024-04-18), "6. Tangut components", Recommendations to UTC #179 April 2024 on Script Proposals
17.0	U+18D82..18DF2	113	L2/24-061		Constable, Peter (2024-04-29), "Consensus 179-C53", UTC #179 Minutes
17.0	U+18D82..18DF2	113		N5218R3	West, Andrew (2024-06-12), Proposal to encode 113 Tangut components

== See also ==
- Ideographic Symbols and Punctuation (Unicode block)
- Tangut (Unicode block)
- Tangut Components (Unicode block)
- Tangut Supplement (Unicode block)
