= Tangut Components =

- Range: U+18800..U+18AFF (768 code points)
- Plane: SMP
- Scripts: Tangut
- Assigned: 768 code points
- Unused: 0 reserved code points

Unicode version history
- 9.0 (2016): 755 (+755)
- 13.0 (2020): 768 (+13)

Unicode documentation
- Code chart ∣ Web page

Tangut Components is a Unicode block containing components and radicals used in the modern study of the Tangut script.

In Unicode 17.0, the Tangut Components Supplement block was assigned for additional Tangut components.

== Block ==
Tangut Components^{[1]} Official Unicode Consortium code chart (PDF)
	0	1	2	3	4	5	6	7	8	9	A	B	C	D	E	F
U+1880x	𘠀	𘠁	𘠂	𘠃	𘠄	𘠅	𘠆	𘠇	𘠈	𘠉	𘠊	𘠋	𘠌	𘠍	𘠎	𘠏
U+1881x	𘠐	𘠑	𘠒	𘠓	𘠔	𘠕	𘠖	𘠗	𘠘	𘠙	𘠚	𘠛	𘠜	𘠝	𘠞	𘠟
U+1882x	𘠠	𘠡	𘠢	𘠣	𘠤	𘠥	𘠦	𘠧	𘠨	𘠩	𘠪	𘠫	𘠬	𘠭	𘠮	𘠯
U+1883x	𘠰	𘠱	𘠲	𘠳	𘠴	𘠵	𘠶	𘠷	𘠸	𘠹	𘠺	𘠻	𘠼	𘠽	𘠾	𘠿
U+1884x	𘡀	𘡁	𘡂	𘡃	𘡄	𘡅	𘡆	𘡇	𘡈	𘡉	𘡊	𘡋	𘡌	𘡍	𘡎	𘡏
U+1885x	𘡐	𘡑	𘡒	𘡓	𘡔	𘡕	𘡖	𘡗	𘡘	𘡙	𘡚	𘡛	𘡜	𘡝	𘡞	𘡟
U+1886x	𘡠	𘡡	𘡢	𘡣	𘡤	𘡥	𘡦	𘡧	𘡨	𘡩	𘡪	𘡫	𘡬	𘡭	𘡮	𘡯
U+1887x	𘡰	𘡱	𘡲	𘡳	𘡴	𘡵	𘡶	𘡷	𘡸	𘡹	𘡺	𘡻	𘡼	𘡽	𘡾	𘡿
U+1888x	𘢀	𘢁	𘢂	𘢃	𘢄	𘢅	𘢆	𘢇	𘢈	𘢉	𘢊	𘢋	𘢌	𘢍	𘢎	𘢏
U+1889x	𘢐	𘢑	𘢒	𘢓	𘢔	𘢕	𘢖	𘢗	𘢘	𘢙	𘢚	𘢛	𘢜	𘢝	𘢞	𘢟
U+188Ax	𘢠	𘢡	𘢢	𘢣	𘢤	𘢥	𘢦	𘢧	𘢨	𘢩	𘢪	𘢫	𘢬	𘢭	𘢮	𘢯
U+188Bx	𘢰	𘢱	𘢲	𘢳	𘢴	𘢵	𘢶	𘢷	𘢸	𘢹	𘢺	𘢻	𘢼	𘢽	𘢾	𘢿
U+188Cx	𘣀	𘣁	𘣂	𘣃	𘣄	𘣅	𘣆	𘣇	𘣈	𘣉	𘣊	𘣋	𘣌	𘣍	𘣎	𘣏
U+188Dx	𘣐	𘣑	𘣒	𘣓	𘣔	𘣕	𘣖	𘣗	𘣘	𘣙	𘣚	𘣛	𘣜	𘣝	𘣞	𘣟
U+188Ex	𘣠	𘣡	𘣢	𘣣	𘣤	𘣥	𘣦	𘣧	𘣨	𘣩	𘣪	𘣫	𘣬	𘣭	𘣮	𘣯
U+188Fx	𘣰	𘣱	𘣲	𘣳	𘣴	𘣵	𘣶	𘣷	𘣸	𘣹	𘣺	𘣻	𘣼	𘣽	𘣾	𘣿
U+1890x	𘤀	𘤁	𘤂	𘤃	𘤄	𘤅	𘤆	𘤇	𘤈	𘤉	𘤊	𘤋	𘤌	𘤍	𘤎	𘤏
U+1891x	𘤐	𘤑	𘤒	𘤓	𘤔	𘤕	𘤖	𘤗	𘤘	𘤙	𘤚	𘤛	𘤜	𘤝	𘤞	𘤟
U+1892x	𘤠	𘤡	𘤢	𘤣	𘤤	𘤥	𘤦	𘤧	𘤨	𘤩	𘤪	𘤫	𘤬	𘤭	𘤮	𘤯
U+1893x	𘤰	𘤱	𘤲	𘤳	𘤴	𘤵	𘤶	𘤷	𘤸	𘤹	𘤺	𘤻	𘤼	𘤽	𘤾	𘤿
U+1894x	𘥀	𘥁	𘥂	𘥃	𘥄	𘥅	𘥆	𘥇	𘥈	𘥉	𘥊	𘥋	𘥌	𘥍	𘥎	𘥏
U+1895x	𘥐	𘥑	𘥒	𘥓	𘥔	𘥕	𘥖	𘥗	𘥘	𘥙	𘥚	𘥛	𘥜	𘥝	𘥞	𘥟
U+1896x	𘥠	𘥡	𘥢	𘥣	𘥤	𘥥	𘥦	𘥧	𘥨	𘥩	𘥪	𘥫	𘥬	𘥭	𘥮	𘥯
U+1897x	𘥰	𘥱	𘥲	𘥳	𘥴	𘥵	𘥶	𘥷	𘥸	𘥹	𘥺	𘥻	𘥼	𘥽	𘥾	𘥿
U+1898x	𘦀	𘦁	𘦂	𘦃	𘦄	𘦅	𘦆	𘦇	𘦈	𘦉	𘦊	𘦋	𘦌	𘦍	𘦎	𘦏
U+1899x	𘦐	𘦑	𘦒	𘦓	𘦔	𘦕	𘦖	𘦗	𘦘	𘦙	𘦚	𘦛	𘦜	𘦝	𘦞	𘦟
U+189Ax	𘦠	𘦡	𘦢	𘦣	𘦤	𘦥	𘦦	𘦧	𘦨	𘦩	𘦪	𘦫	𘦬	𘦭	𘦮	𘦯
U+189Bx	𘦰	𘦱	𘦲	𘦳	𘦴	𘦵	𘦶	𘦷	𘦸	𘦹	𘦺	𘦻	𘦼	𘦽	𘦾	𘦿
U+189Cx	𘧀	𘧁	𘧂	𘧃	𘧄	𘧅	𘧆	𘧇	𘧈	𘧉	𘧊	𘧋	𘧌	𘧍	𘧎	𘧏
U+189Dx	𘧐	𘧑	𘧒	𘧓	𘧔	𘧕	𘧖	𘧗	𘧘	𘧙	𘧚	𘧛	𘧜	𘧝	𘧞	𘧟
U+189Ex	𘧠	𘧡	𘧢	𘧣	𘧤	𘧥	𘧦	𘧧	𘧨	𘧩	𘧪	𘧫	𘧬	𘧭	𘧮	𘧯
U+189Fx	𘧰	𘧱	𘧲	𘧳	𘧴	𘧵	𘧶	𘧷	𘧸	𘧹	𘧺	𘧻	𘧼	𘧽	𘧾	𘧿
U+18A0x	𘨀	𘨁	𘨂	𘨃	𘨄	𘨅	𘨆	𘨇	𘨈	𘨉	𘨊	𘨋	𘨌	𘨍	𘨎	𘨏
U+18A1x	𘨐	𘨑	𘨒	𘨓	𘨔	𘨕	𘨖	𘨗	𘨘	𘨙	𘨚	𘨛	𘨜	𘨝	𘨞	𘨟
U+18A2x	𘨠	𘨡	𘨢	𘨣	𘨤	𘨥	𘨦	𘨧	𘨨	𘨩	𘨪	𘨫	𘨬	𘨭	𘨮	𘨯
U+18A3x	𘨰	𘨱	𘨲	𘨳	𘨴	𘨵	𘨶	𘨷	𘨸	𘨹	𘨺	𘨻	𘨼	𘨽	𘨾	𘨿
U+18A4x	𘩀	𘩁	𘩂	𘩃	𘩄	𘩅	𘩆	𘩇	𘩈	𘩉	𘩊	𘩋	𘩌	𘩍	𘩎	𘩏
U+18A5x	𘩐	𘩑	𘩒	𘩓	𘩔	𘩕	𘩖	𘩗	𘩘	𘩙	𘩚	𘩛	𘩜	𘩝	𘩞	𘩟
U+18A6x	𘩠	𘩡	𘩢	𘩣	𘩤	𘩥	𘩦	𘩧	𘩨	𘩩	𘩪	𘩫	𘩬	𘩭	𘩮	𘩯
U+18A7x	𘩰	𘩱	𘩲	𘩳	𘩴	𘩵	𘩶	𘩷	𘩸	𘩹	𘩺	𘩻	𘩼	𘩽	𘩾	𘩿
U+18A8x	𘪀	𘪁	𘪂	𘪃	𘪄	𘪅	𘪆	𘪇	𘪈	𘪉	𘪊	𘪋	𘪌	𘪍	𘪎	𘪏
U+18A9x	𘪐	𘪑	𘪒	𘪓	𘪔	𘪕	𘪖	𘪗	𘪘	𘪙	𘪚	𘪛	𘪜	𘪝	𘪞	𘪟
U+18AAx	𘪠	𘪡	𘪢	𘪣	𘪤	𘪥	𘪦	𘪧	𘪨	𘪩	𘪪	𘪫	𘪬	𘪭	𘪮	𘪯
U+18ABx	𘪰	𘪱	𘪲	𘪳	𘪴	𘪵	𘪶	𘪷	𘪸	𘪹	𘪺	𘪻	𘪼	𘪽	𘪾	𘪿
U+18ACx	𘫀	𘫁	𘫂	𘫃	𘫄	𘫅	𘫆	𘫇	𘫈	𘫉	𘫊	𘫋	𘫌	𘫍	𘫎	𘫏
U+18ADx	𘫐	𘫑	𘫒	𘫓	𘫔	𘫕	𘫖	𘫗	𘫘	𘫙	𘫚	𘫛	𘫜	𘫝	𘫞	𘫟
U+18AEx	𘫠	𘫡	𘫢	𘫣	𘫤	𘫥	𘫦	𘫧	𘫨	𘫩	𘫪	𘫫	𘫬	𘫭	𘫮	𘫯
U+18AFx	𘫰	𘫱	𘫲	𘫳	𘫴	𘫵	𘫶	𘫷	𘫸	𘫹	𘫺	𘫻	𘫼	𘫽	𘫾	𘫿
Notes: 1. As of Unicode version 17.0

== History ==
The following Unicode-related documents record the purpose and process of defining specific characters in the Tangut Components block:

Version	Final code points (Note: Proposed code points and characters names may differ from final code points and names)	Count	L2 ID	WG2 ID	Document
9.0	U+18800..18AF2	755	L2/08-335	N3495	Everson, Michael; West, Andrew (2008-09-01), Proposal to encode Tangut Radicals and CJK Strokes in the UCS
9.0	U+18800..18AF2	755	L2/08-399		Cook, Richard; Anderson, Deborah (2008-10-29), Comments on the Tangut radicals and strokes proposal (N3495 = L2/08-335)
9.0	U+18800..18AF2	755		N4094	Cook, Richard; Anderson, Deborah (2011-06-01), Comments on Tangut report N4033
9.0	U+18800..18AF2	755	L2/12-314	N4326	West, Andrew; Zaytsev, Viacheslav; Everson, Michael (2012-10-02), Proposal to encode Tangut radicals in the UCS
9.0	U+18800..18AF2	755	L2/12-315	N4327	Everson, Michael; West, Andrew (2012-10-02), Code chart for Tangut ideographs and Tangut radicals
9.0	U+18800..18AF2	755	L2/13-241	N4516	Anderson, Deborah (2013-12-10), Summary of Tangut meeting (Beijing, China)
9.0	U+18800..18AF2	755	L2/14-023	N4522	West, Andrew; Everson, Michael; Xiaomang, Han; Jia, Changye; Jing, Yongshi; Zaytsev, Viacheslav (2014-01-21), Proposal to encode the Tangut script in the UCS
9.0	U+18800..18AF2	755	L2/14-246	N4642	Anderson, Deborah (2014-09-29), Ad Hoc Reports for Tangut and Khitan Large Script
9.0	U+18800..18AF2	755	L2/14-228	N4636	West, Andrew; Zaytsev, Viacheslav; Sun, Bojun; Everson, Michael (2014-09-30), Proposal to encode Tangut radicals in the UCS
9.0	U+18800..18AF2	755	L2/14-268R		Anderson, Deborah; Whistler, Ken; McGowan, Rick; Pournader, Roozbeh; Iancu, Laurențiu; Glass, Andrew; Constable, Peter; Suignard, Michel (2014-10-27), "12. Tangut Radicals", Recommendations to UTC #141 October 2014 on Script Proposals
9.0	U+18800..18AF2	755	L2/15-017		Moore, Lisa (2015-02-12), "Consensus 142-C2", UTC #142 Minutes
9.0	U+18800..18AF2	755	L2/16-052	N4603 (pdf, doc)	Umamaheswaran, V. S. (2015-09-01), "M63.10", Unconfirmed minutes of WG 2 meeting 63
9.0	U+18800..18AF2	755	L2/15-254		Moore, Lisa (2015-11-16), "Consensus 145-C16", UTC #145 Minutes, "Remove U+186A2; add U+18817 and U+18818, and reorder the Tangut block and components block, and change glyphs based on document L2/15-265."
9.0	U+18800..18AF2	755	L2/17-313	N4850	West, Andrew; Zaytsev, Viacheslav (2017-09-07), Glyph Corrections for 31 Tangut ideographs and one Tangut component
9.0	U+18800..18AF2	755	L2/17-367	N4885	Anderson, Deborah; Whistler, Ken; Pournader, Roozbeh; Moore, Lisa (2017-09-18), "2a. Tangut", Comments on WG2 #66 (Sept. 2017) documents
9.0	U+18800..18AF2	755	L2/17-360	N4896	West, Andrew; Zaytsev, Viacheslav; Sun, Bojun; You, Jerry (2017-09-22), Tangut Character Additions and Glyph Corrections (replaces L2/17-313 and L2/17-314)
9.0	U+18800..18AF2	755	L2/19-064	N5031	West, Andrew; Zaytsev, Viacheslav (2019-02-11), Investigation of Tangut unification issues
9.0	U+18800..18AF2	755	L2/19-173		Anderson, Deborah; et al. (2019-04-29), "20. Tangut", Recommendations to UTC #159 April-May 2019 on Script Proposals
9.0	U+18800..18AF2	755	L2/19-207	N5064	West, Andrew; Zaytsev, Viacheslav; Jia, Changye; Jing, Yongshi; Sun, Bojun (2019-05-27), Proposal to encode nine Tangut ideographs and six Tangut components
13.0	U+18AF3..18AF9	7	L2/18-194	N4957	West, Andrew (2018-06-01), Proposal to encode seven additional Tangut components
13.0	U+18AF3..18AF9	7	L2/18-183		Moore, Lisa (2018-11-20), "C.7", UTC #156 Minutes
13.0	U+18AF3..18AF9	7		N5020 (pdf, doc)	Umamaheswaran, V. S. (2019-01-11), "10.3.10", Unconfirmed minutes of WG 2 meeting 67
13.0	U+18AFA..18AFF	6	L2/19-064	N5031	West, Andrew; Zaytsev, Viacheslav (2019-02-11), Investigation of Tangut unification issues
13.0	U+18AFA..18AFF	6	L2/19-173		Anderson, Deborah; et al. (2019-04-29), "20. Tangut", Recommendations to UTC #159 April-May 2019 on Script Proposals
13.0	U+18AFA..18AFF	6	L2/19-207	N5064	West, Andrew; Zaytsev, Viacheslav; Jia, Changye; Jing, Yongshi; Sun, Bojun (2019-05-27), Proposal to encode nine Tangut ideographs and six Tangut components
13.0	U+18AFA..18AFF	6		N5095	Anderson, Deborah; Whistler, Ken; Pournader, Roozbeh; Liang, Hai; Constable, Peter; Moore, Lisa (2019-06-10), "TANGUT", Comments on WG2 #68 documents
13.0	U+18AFA..18AFF	6		N5122	"M68.04", Unconfirmed minutes of WG 2 meeting 68, 2019-12-31
13.0	U+18AFA..18AFF	6	L2/19-270		Moore, Lisa (2019-10-07), "Consensus 160-C11", UTC #160 Minutes

== See also ==
- Tangut (Unicode block)
- Tangut Supplement (Unicode block)
- Tangut Components Supplement (Unicode block)
- Ideographic Symbols and Punctuation (Unicode block)
