= Tangut Supplement =

- Range: U+18D00..U+18D7F (128 code points)
- Plane: SMP
- Scripts: Tangut
- Assigned: 33 code points
- Unused: 95 reserved code points

Unicode Version History
- 13.0 (2020): 9 (+9)
- 17.0 (2025): 31 (+22)
- 18.0 (2026): 33 (+2)

Unicode documentation
- Code chart ∣ Web page
- Note: 16 unused code points were trimmed from the end of the block in Unicode 14.0.

Tangut Supplement is a Unicode block containing characters from the Tangut script, which was used for writing the Tangut language spoken by the Tangut people in the Western Xia Empire, and in China during the Yuan dynasty and early Ming dynasty. This block is a supplement to the main Tangut block.

The Tangut Supplement block size was changed in Unicode version 14.0 to correct the erroneous block end point (version 13: 18D8F → version 14.0: 18D7F).

== Block ==
Tangut Supplement^{[1]}^{[2]} Official Unicode Consortium code chart (PDF)
	0	1	2	3	4	5	6	7	8	9	A	B	C	D	E	F
U+18D0x	𘴀	𘴁	𘴂	𘴃	𘴄	𘴅	𘴆	𘴇	𘴈	𘴉	𘴊	𘴋	𘴌	𘴍	𘴎	𘴏
U+18D1x	𘴐	𘴑	𘴒	𘴓	𘴔	𘴕	𘴖	𘴗	𘴘	𘴙	𘴚	𘴛	𘴜	𘴝	𘴞	𘴟
U+18D2x	𘴠															
U+18D3x																
U+18D4x																
U+18D5x																
U+18D6x																
U+18D7x																
Notes 1.As of Unicode version 18.0 2.Grey areas indicate non-assigned code points

== History ==
The following Unicode-related documents record the purpose and process of defining specific characters in the Tangut Supplement block:

Version	Final code points (Note: Proposed code points and characters names may differ from final code points and names)	Count	L2 ID	WG2 ID	Document
13.0	U+18D00..18D08	9	L2/19-064	N5031	West, Andrew; Zaytsev, Viacheslav (2019-02-11), Investigation of Tangut unification issues
13.0	U+18D00..18D08	9	L2/19-173		Anderson, Deborah; et al. (2019-04-29), "20. Tangut", Recommendations to UTC #159 April-May 2019 on Script Proposals
13.0	U+18D00..18D08	9	L2/19-207	N5064	West, Andrew; Zaytsev, Viacheslav; Jia, Changye; Jing, Yongshi; Sun, Bojun (2019-05-27), Proposal to encode nine Tangut ideographs and six Tangut components
13.0	U+18D00..18D08	9		N5095	Anderson, Deborah; Whistler, Ken; Pournader, Roozbeh; Liang, Hai; Constable, Peter; Moore, Lisa (2019-06-10), "TANGUT", Comments on WG2 #68 documents
13.0	U+18D00..18D08	9		N5122	"M68.04", Unconfirmed minutes of WG 2 meeting 68, 2019-12-31
13.0	U+18D00..18D08	9	L2/19-270		Moore, Lisa (2019-10-07), "Consensus 160-C11", UTC #160 Minutes
17.0	U+18D09..18D1C	20	L2/23-149	N5217	West, Andrew (2023-05-31), Proposal to encode 2 Tangut components and 29 Tangut ideographs
17.0	U+18D09..18D1C	20	L2/23-164		Anderson, Deborah; Kučera, Jan; Whistler, Ken; Pournader, Roozbeh; Constable, Peter (2023-07-21), "5 Tangut", Recommendations to UTC #176 July 2023 on Script Proposals
17.0	U+18D09..18D1C	20	L2/23-246	N5217R	West, Andrew (2023-10-02), Proposal to encode 2 Tangut components and 28 Tangut ideographs
17.0	U+18D09..18D1C	20	L2/23-238R		Anderson, Deborah; Kučera, Jan; Whistler, Ken; Pournader, Roozbeh; Constable, Peter (2023-11-01), "5c Two Tangut Components and 28 Tangut Ideographs", Recommendations to UTC #177 November 2023 on Script Proposals
17.0	U+18D09..18D1C	20	L2/23-231		Constable, Peter (2023-12-08), "Consensus 177-C28", UTC #177 Minutes
17.0	U+18D1D..18D1E	2	L2/23-246	N5217R	West, Andrew (2023-10-02), Proposal to encode 2 Tangut components and 28 Tangut ideographs
17.0	U+18D1D..18D1E	2	L2/23-238R		Anderson, Deborah; Kučera, Jan; Whistler, Ken; Pournader, Roozbeh; Constable, Peter (2023-11-01), "5c Two Tangut Components and 28 Tangut Ideographs", Recommendations to UTC #177 November 2023 on Script Proposals
17.0	U+18D1D..18D1E	2	L2/23-231		Constable, Peter (2023-12-08), "Consensus 177-C28", UTC #177 Minutes
18.0	U+18D1F	1		N5303	West, Andrew; Zaytsev, Viacheslav (2025-03-28), Proposal to encode one Tangut ideograph
18.0	U+18D1F	1	L2/25-091R		Kučera, Jan; et al. (2025-04-22), "1.4 Tangut Ideograph tśia̱²", Recommendations to UTC #183 (April 2025) on Script Proposals
18.0	U+18D1F	1	L2/25-085		Leroy, Robin (2025-04-28), "Consensus 183-C7", UTC #183 Minutes, "Provisionally assign one code point U+18D1F ..."
18.0	U+18D1F	1	L2/25-226		"Consensus 185-C39", UTC #185 Minutes, 2025-10-29, "UTC accepts for encoding in Unicode 18.0 ..."
18.0	U+18D20	1	L2/25-165		West, Andrew (2025-05-26), Proposal to encode one newly-identified Tangut ideograph
18.0	U+18D20	1	L2/25-187		Kučera, Jan; Anderson, Deborah; Pournader, Roozbeh; Constable, Peter; Goregaokar, Manish; Leroy, Robin (2025-07-18), "1.1 Tangut rên¹", Recommendations to UTC #184 (July 2025) on Script Proposals
18.0	U+18D20	1	L2/25-181		Leroy, Robin (2025-08-07), "Consensus 184-C4", UTC #184 Minutes, "Provisionally assign one code point U+18D20 ..."
18.0	U+18D20	1	L2/25-226		"Consensus 185-C39", UTC #185 Minutes, 2025-10-29, "UTC accepts for encoding in Unicode 18.0 ..."

== See also ==
- Tangut (Unicode block)
- Tangut Components (Unicode block)
- Tangut Components Supplement (Unicode block)
- Ideographic Symbols and Punctuation (Unicode block)
