= Tangut (Unicode block) =

- Range: U+17000..U+187FF (6,144 code points)
- Plane: SMP
- Scripts: Tangut
- Assigned: 6,144 code points
- Unused: 0 reserved code points

Unicode version history
- 9.0 (2016): 6,125 (+6,125)
- 11.0 (2018): 6,130 (+5)
- 12.0 (2019): 6,136 (+6)
- 17.0 (2025): 6,144 (+8)

Unicode documentation
- Code chart ∣ Web page

Tangut is a Unicode block containing characters from the Tangut script, which was used for writing the Tangut language spoken by the Tangut people in the Western Xia Empire, and in China during the Yuan dynasty and early Ming dynasty.

Tangut characters do not have descriptive character names, but have names derived algorithmically from their code point value (e.g. U+17000 is named TANGUT IDEOGRAPH-17000).

In Unicode 13.0, the Tangut Supplement block was assigned for additional Tangut ideographs.

== Block ==
Tangut^{[1]} Official Unicode Consortium code chart (PDF)
	0	1	2	3	4	5	6	7	8	9	A	B	C	D	E	F
U+1700x	𗀀	𗀁	𗀂	𗀃	𗀄	𗀅	𗀆	𗀇	𗀈	𗀉	𗀊	𗀋	𗀌	𗀍	𗀎	𗀏
U+1701x	𗀐	𗀑	𗀒	𗀓	𗀔	𗀕	𗀖	𗀗	𗀘	𗀙	𗀚	𗀛	𗀜	𗀝	𗀞	𗀟
U+1702x	𗀠	𗀡	𗀢	𗀣	𗀤	𗀥	𗀦	𗀧	𗀨	𗀩	𗀪	𗀫	𗀬	𗀭	𗀮	𗀯
U+1703x	𗀰	𗀱	𗀲	𗀳	𗀴	𗀵	𗀶	𗀷	𗀸	𗀹	𗀺	𗀻	𗀼	𗀽	𗀾	𗀿
U+1704x	𗁀	𗁁	𗁂	𗁃	𗁄	𗁅	𗁆	𗁇	𗁈	𗁉	𗁊	𗁋	𗁌	𗁍	𗁎	𗁏
U+1705x	𗁐	𗁑	𗁒	𗁓	𗁔	𗁕	𗁖	𗁗	𗁘	𗁙	𗁚	𗁛	𗁜	𗁝	𗁞	𗁟
U+1706x	𗁠	𗁡	𗁢	𗁣	𗁤	𗁥	𗁦	𗁧	𗁨	𗁩	𗁪	𗁫	𗁬	𗁭	𗁮	𗁯
U+1707x	𗁰	𗁱	𗁲	𗁳	𗁴	𗁵	𗁶	𗁷	𗁸	𗁹	𗁺	𗁻	𗁼	𗁽	𗁾	𗁿
U+1708x	𗂀	𗂁	𗂂	𗂃	𗂄	𗂅	𗂆	𗂇	𗂈	𗂉	𗂊	𗂋	𗂌	𗂍	𗂎	𗂏
U+1709x	𗂐	𗂑	𗂒	𗂓	𗂔	𗂕	𗂖	𗂗	𗂘	𗂙	𗂚	𗂛	𗂜	𗂝	𗂞	𗂟
U+170Ax	𗂠	𗂡	𗂢	𗂣	𗂤	𗂥	𗂦	𗂧	𗂨	𗂩	𗂪	𗂫	𗂬	𗂭	𗂮	𗂯
U+170Bx	𗂰	𗂱	𗂲	𗂳	𗂴	𗂵	𗂶	𗂷	𗂸	𗂹	𗂺	𗂻	𗂼	𗂽	𗂾	𗂿
U+170Cx	𗃀	𗃁	𗃂	𗃃	𗃄	𗃅	𗃆	𗃇	𗃈	𗃉	𗃊	𗃋	𗃌	𗃍	𗃎	𗃏
U+170Dx	𗃐	𗃑	𗃒	𗃓	𗃔	𗃕	𗃖	𗃗	𗃘	𗃙	𗃚	𗃛	𗃜	𗃝	𗃞	𗃟
U+170Ex	𗃠	𗃡	𗃢	𗃣	𗃤	𗃥	𗃦	𗃧	𗃨	𗃩	𗃪	𗃫	𗃬	𗃭	𗃮	𗃯
U+170Fx	𗃰	𗃱	𗃲	𗃳	𗃴	𗃵	𗃶	𗃷	𗃸	𗃹	𗃺	𗃻	𗃼	𗃽	𗃾	𗃿
U+1710x	𗄀	𗄁	𗄂	𗄃	𗄄	𗄅	𗄆	𗄇	𗄈	𗄉	𗄊	𗄋	𗄌	𗄍	𗄎	𗄏
U+1711x	𗄐	𗄑	𗄒	𗄓	𗄔	𗄕	𗄖	𗄗	𗄘	𗄙	𗄚	𗄛	𗄜	𗄝	𗄞	𗄟
U+1712x	𗄠	𗄡	𗄢	𗄣	𗄤	𗄥	𗄦	𗄧	𗄨	𗄩	𗄪	𗄫	𗄬	𗄭	𗄮	𗄯
U+1713x	𗄰	𗄱	𗄲	𗄳	𗄴	𗄵	𗄶	𗄷	𗄸	𗄹	𗄺	𗄻	𗄼	𗄽	𗄾	𗄿
U+1714x	𗅀	𗅁	𗅂	𗅃	𗅄	𗅅	𗅆	𗅇	𗅈	𗅉	𗅊	𗅋	𗅌	𗅍	𗅎	𗅏
U+1715x	𗅐	𗅑	𗅒	𗅓	𗅔	𗅕	𗅖	𗅗	𗅘	𗅙	𗅚	𗅛	𗅜	𗅝	𗅞	𗅟
U+1716x	𗅠	𗅡	𗅢	𗅣	𗅤	𗅥	𗅦	𗅧	𗅨	𗅩	𗅪	𗅫	𗅬	𗅭	𗅮	𗅯
U+1717x	𗅰	𗅱	𗅲	𗅳	𗅴	𗅵	𗅶	𗅷	𗅸	𗅹	𗅺	𗅻	𗅼	𗅽	𗅾	𗅿
U+1718x	𗆀	𗆁	𗆂	𗆃	𗆄	𗆅	𗆆	𗆇	𗆈	𗆉	𗆊	𗆋	𗆌	𗆍	𗆎	𗆏
U+1719x	𗆐	𗆑	𗆒	𗆓	𗆔	𗆕	𗆖	𗆗	𗆘	𗆙	𗆚	𗆛	𗆜	𗆝	𗆞	𗆟
U+171Ax	𗆠	𗆡	𗆢	𗆣	𗆤	𗆥	𗆦	𗆧	𗆨	𗆩	𗆪	𗆫	𗆬	𗆭	𗆮	𗆯
U+171Bx	𗆰	𗆱	𗆲	𗆳	𗆴	𗆵	𗆶	𗆷	𗆸	𗆹	𗆺	𗆻	𗆼	𗆽	𗆾	𗆿
U+171Cx	𗇀	𗇁	𗇂	𗇃	𗇄	𗇅	𗇆	𗇇	𗇈	𗇉	𗇊	𗇋	𗇌	𗇍	𗇎	𗇏
U+171Dx	𗇐	𗇑	𗇒	𗇓	𗇔	𗇕	𗇖	𗇗	𗇘	𗇙	𗇚	𗇛	𗇜	𗇝	𗇞	𗇟
U+171Ex	𗇠	𗇡	𗇢	𗇣	𗇤	𗇥	𗇦	𗇧	𗇨	𗇩	𗇪	𗇫	𗇬	𗇭	𗇮	𗇯
U+171Fx	𗇰	𗇱	𗇲	𗇳	𗇴	𗇵	𗇶	𗇷	𗇸	𗇹	𗇺	𗇻	𗇼	𗇽	𗇾	𗇿
U+1720x	𗈀	𗈁	𗈂	𗈃	𗈄	𗈅	𗈆	𗈇	𗈈	𗈉	𗈊	𗈋	𗈌	𗈍	𗈎	𗈏
U+1721x	𗈐	𗈑	𗈒	𗈓	𗈔	𗈕	𗈖	𗈗	𗈘	𗈙	𗈚	𗈛	𗈜	𗈝	𗈞	𗈟
U+1722x	𗈠	𗈡	𗈢	𗈣	𗈤	𗈥	𗈦	𗈧	𗈨	𗈩	𗈪	𗈫	𗈬	𗈭	𗈮	𗈯
U+1723x	𗈰	𗈱	𗈲	𗈳	𗈴	𗈵	𗈶	𗈷	𗈸	𗈹	𗈺	𗈻	𗈼	𗈽	𗈾	𗈿
U+1724x	𗉀	𗉁	𗉂	𗉃	𗉄	𗉅	𗉆	𗉇	𗉈	𗉉	𗉊	𗉋	𗉌	𗉍	𗉎	𗉏
U+1725x	𗉐	𗉑	𗉒	𗉓	𗉔	𗉕	𗉖	𗉗	𗉘	𗉙	𗉚	𗉛	𗉜	𗉝	𗉞	𗉟
U+1726x	𗉠	𗉡	𗉢	𗉣	𗉤	𗉥	𗉦	𗉧	𗉨	𗉩	𗉪	𗉫	𗉬	𗉭	𗉮	𗉯
U+1727x	𗉰	𗉱	𗉲	𗉳	𗉴	𗉵	𗉶	𗉷	𗉸	𗉹	𗉺	𗉻	𗉼	𗉽	𗉾	𗉿
U+1728x	𗊀	𗊁	𗊂	𗊃	𗊄	𗊅	𗊆	𗊇	𗊈	𗊉	𗊊	𗊋	𗊌	𗊍	𗊎	𗊏
U+1729x	𗊐	𗊑	𗊒	𗊓	𗊔	𗊕	𗊖	𗊗	𗊘	𗊙	𗊚	𗊛	𗊜	𗊝	𗊞	𗊟
U+172Ax	𗊠	𗊡	𗊢	𗊣	𗊤	𗊥	𗊦	𗊧	𗊨	𗊩	𗊪	𗊫	𗊬	𗊭	𗊮	𗊯
U+172Bx	𗊰	𗊱	𗊲	𗊳	𗊴	𗊵	𗊶	𗊷	𗊸	𗊹	𗊺	𗊻	𗊼	𗊽	𗊾	𗊿
U+172Cx	𗋀	𗋁	𗋂	𗋃	𗋄	𗋅	𗋆	𗋇	𗋈	𗋉	𗋊	𗋋	𗋌	𗋍	𗋎	𗋏
U+172Dx	𗋐	𗋑	𗋒	𗋓	𗋔	𗋕	𗋖	𗋗	𗋘	𗋙	𗋚	𗋛	𗋜	𗋝	𗋞	𗋟
U+172Ex	𗋠	𗋡	𗋢	𗋣	𗋤	𗋥	𗋦	𗋧	𗋨	𗋩	𗋪	𗋫	𗋬	𗋭	𗋮	𗋯
U+172Fx	𗋰	𗋱	𗋲	𗋳	𗋴	𗋵	𗋶	𗋷	𗋸	𗋹	𗋺	𗋻	𗋼	𗋽	𗋾	𗋿
U+1730x	𗌀	𗌁	𗌂	𗌃	𗌄	𗌅	𗌆	𗌇	𗌈	𗌉	𗌊	𗌋	𗌌	𗌍	𗌎	𗌏
U+1731x	𗌐	𗌑	𗌒	𗌓	𗌔	𗌕	𗌖	𗌗	𗌘	𗌙	𗌚	𗌛	𗌜	𗌝	𗌞	𗌟
U+1732x	𗌠	𗌡	𗌢	𗌣	𗌤	𗌥	𗌦	𗌧	𗌨	𗌩	𗌪	𗌫	𗌬	𗌭	𗌮	𗌯
U+1733x	𗌰	𗌱	𗌲	𗌳	𗌴	𗌵	𗌶	𗌷	𗌸	𗌹	𗌺	𗌻	𗌼	𗌽	𗌾	𗌿
U+1734x	𗍀	𗍁	𗍂	𗍃	𗍄	𗍅	𗍆	𗍇	𗍈	𗍉	𗍊	𗍋	𗍌	𗍍	𗍎	𗍏
U+1735x	𗍐	𗍑	𗍒	𗍓	𗍔	𗍕	𗍖	𗍗	𗍘	𗍙	𗍚	𗍛	𗍜	𗍝	𗍞	𗍟
U+1736x	𗍠	𗍡	𗍢	𗍣	𗍤	𗍥	𗍦	𗍧	𗍨	𗍩	𗍪	𗍫	𗍬	𗍭	𗍮	𗍯
U+1737x	𗍰	𗍱	𗍲	𗍳	𗍴	𗍵	𗍶	𗍷	𗍸	𗍹	𗍺	𗍻	𗍼	𗍽	𗍾	𗍿
U+1738x	𗎀	𗎁	𗎂	𗎃	𗎄	𗎅	𗎆	𗎇	𗎈	𗎉	𗎊	𗎋	𗎌	𗎍	𗎎	𗎏
U+1739x	𗎐	𗎑	𗎒	𗎓	𗎔	𗎕	𗎖	𗎗	𗎘	𗎙	𗎚	𗎛	𗎜	𗎝	𗎞	𗎟
U+173Ax	𗎠	𗎡	𗎢	𗎣	𗎤	𗎥	𗎦	𗎧	𗎨	𗎩	𗎪	𗎫	𗎬	𗎭	𗎮	𗎯
U+173Bx	𗎰	𗎱	𗎲	𗎳	𗎴	𗎵	𗎶	𗎷	𗎸	𗎹	𗎺	𗎻	𗎼	𗎽	𗎾	𗎿
U+173Cx	𗏀	𗏁	𗏂	𗏃	𗏄	𗏅	𗏆	𗏇	𗏈	𗏉	𗏊	𗏋	𗏌	𗏍	𗏎	𗏏
U+173Dx	𗏐	𗏑	𗏒	𗏓	𗏔	𗏕	𗏖	𗏗	𗏘	𗏙	𗏚	𗏛	𗏜	𗏝	𗏞	𗏟
U+173Ex	𗏠	𗏡	𗏢	𗏣	𗏤	𗏥	𗏦	𗏧	𗏨	𗏩	𗏪	𗏫	𗏬	𗏭	𗏮	𗏯
U+173Fx	𗏰	𗏱	𗏲	𗏳	𗏴	𗏵	𗏶	𗏷	𗏸	𗏹	𗏺	𗏻	𗏼	𗏽	𗏾	𗏿
U+1740x	𗐀	𗐁	𗐂	𗐃	𗐄	𗐅	𗐆	𗐇	𗐈	𗐉	𗐊	𗐋	𗐌	𗐍	𗐎	𗐏
U+1741x	𗐐	𗐑	𗐒	𗐓	𗐔	𗐕	𗐖	𗐗	𗐘	𗐙	𗐚	𗐛	𗐜	𗐝	𗐞	𗐟
U+1742x	𗐠	𗐡	𗐢	𗐣	𗐤	𗐥	𗐦	𗐧	𗐨	𗐩	𗐪	𗐫	𗐬	𗐭	𗐮	𗐯
U+1743x	𗐰	𗐱	𗐲	𗐳	𗐴	𗐵	𗐶	𗐷	𗐸	𗐹	𗐺	𗐻	𗐼	𗐽	𗐾	𗐿
U+1744x	𗑀	𗑁	𗑂	𗑃	𗑄	𗑅	𗑆	𗑇	𗑈	𗑉	𗑊	𗑋	𗑌	𗑍	𗑎	𗑏
U+1745x	𗑐	𗑑	𗑒	𗑓	𗑔	𗑕	𗑖	𗑗	𗑘	𗑙	𗑚	𗑛	𗑜	𗑝	𗑞	𗑟
U+1746x	𗑠	𗑡	𗑢	𗑣	𗑤	𗑥	𗑦	𗑧	𗑨	𗑩	𗑪	𗑫	𗑬	𗑭	𗑮	𗑯
U+1747x	𗑰	𗑱	𗑲	𗑳	𗑴	𗑵	𗑶	𗑷	𗑸	𗑹	𗑺	𗑻	𗑼	𗑽	𗑾	𗑿
U+1748x	𗒀	𗒁	𗒂	𗒃	𗒄	𗒅	𗒆	𗒇	𗒈	𗒉	𗒊	𗒋	𗒌	𗒍	𗒎	𗒏
U+1749x	𗒐	𗒑	𗒒	𗒓	𗒔	𗒕	𗒖	𗒗	𗒘	𗒙	𗒚	𗒛	𗒜	𗒝	𗒞	𗒟
U+174Ax	𗒠	𗒡	𗒢	𗒣	𗒤	𗒥	𗒦	𗒧	𗒨	𗒩	𗒪	𗒫	𗒬	𗒭	𗒮	𗒯
U+174Bx	𗒰	𗒱	𗒲	𗒳	𗒴	𗒵	𗒶	𗒷	𗒸	𗒹	𗒺	𗒻	𗒼	𗒽	𗒾	𗒿
U+174Cx	𗓀	𗓁	𗓂	𗓃	𗓄	𗓅	𗓆	𗓇	𗓈	𗓉	𗓊	𗓋	𗓌	𗓍	𗓎	𗓏
U+174Dx	𗓐	𗓑	𗓒	𗓓	𗓔	𗓕	𗓖	𗓗	𗓘	𗓙	𗓚	𗓛	𗓜	𗓝	𗓞	𗓟
U+174Ex	𗓠	𗓡	𗓢	𗓣	𗓤	𗓥	𗓦	𗓧	𗓨	𗓩	𗓪	𗓫	𗓬	𗓭	𗓮	𗓯
U+174Fx	𗓰	𗓱	𗓲	𗓳	𗓴	𗓵	𗓶	𗓷	𗓸	𗓹	𗓺	𗓻	𗓼	𗓽	𗓾	𗓿
U+1750x	𗔀	𗔁	𗔂	𗔃	𗔄	𗔅	𗔆	𗔇	𗔈	𗔉	𗔊	𗔋	𗔌	𗔍	𗔎	𗔏
U+1751x	𗔐	𗔑	𗔒	𗔓	𗔔	𗔕	𗔖	𗔗	𗔘	𗔙	𗔚	𗔛	𗔜	𗔝	𗔞	𗔟
U+1752x	𗔠	𗔡	𗔢	𗔣	𗔤	𗔥	𗔦	𗔧	𗔨	𗔩	𗔪	𗔫	𗔬	𗔭	𗔮	𗔯
U+1753x	𗔰	𗔱	𗔲	𗔳	𗔴	𗔵	𗔶	𗔷	𗔸	𗔹	𗔺	𗔻	𗔼	𗔽	𗔾	𗔿
U+1754x	𗕀	𗕁	𗕂	𗕃	𗕄	𗕅	𗕆	𗕇	𗕈	𗕉	𗕊	𗕋	𗕌	𗕍	𗕎	𗕏
U+1755x	𗕐	𗕑	𗕒	𗕓	𗕔	𗕕	𗕖	𗕗	𗕘	𗕙	𗕚	𗕛	𗕜	𗕝	𗕞	𗕟
U+1756x	𗕠	𗕡	𗕢	𗕣	𗕤	𗕥	𗕦	𗕧	𗕨	𗕩	𗕪	𗕫	𗕬	𗕭	𗕮	𗕯
U+1757x	𗕰	𗕱	𗕲	𗕳	𗕴	𗕵	𗕶	𗕷	𗕸	𗕹	𗕺	𗕻	𗕼	𗕽	𗕾	𗕿
U+1758x	𗖀	𗖁	𗖂	𗖃	𗖄	𗖅	𗖆	𗖇	𗖈	𗖉	𗖊	𗖋	𗖌	𗖍	𗖎	𗖏
U+1759x	𗖐	𗖑	𗖒	𗖓	𗖔	𗖕	𗖖	𗖗	𗖘	𗖙	𗖚	𗖛	𗖜	𗖝	𗖞	𗖟
U+175Ax	𗖠	𗖡	𗖢	𗖣	𗖤	𗖥	𗖦	𗖧	𗖨	𗖩	𗖪	𗖫	𗖬	𗖭	𗖮	𗖯
U+175Bx	𗖰	𗖱	𗖲	𗖳	𗖴	𗖵	𗖶	𗖷	𗖸	𗖹	𗖺	𗖻	𗖼	𗖽	𗖾	𗖿
U+175Cx	𗗀	𗗁	𗗂	𗗃	𗗄	𗗅	𗗆	𗗇	𗗈	𗗉	𗗊	𗗋	𗗌	𗗍	𗗎	𗗏
U+175Dx	𗗐	𗗑	𗗒	𗗓	𗗔	𗗕	𗗖	𗗗	𗗘	𗗙	𗗚	𗗛	𗗜	𗗝	𗗞	𗗟
U+175Ex	𗗠	𗗡	𗗢	𗗣	𗗤	𗗥	𗗦	𗗧	𗗨	𗗩	𗗪	𗗫	𗗬	𗗭	𗗮	𗗯
U+175Fx	𗗰	𗗱	𗗲	𗗳	𗗴	𗗵	𗗶	𗗷	𗗸	𗗹	𗗺	𗗻	𗗼	𗗽	𗗾	𗗿
U+1760x	𗘀	𗘁	𗘂	𗘃	𗘄	𗘅	𗘆	𗘇	𗘈	𗘉	𗘊	𗘋	𗘌	𗘍	𗘎	𗘏
U+1761x	𗘐	𗘑	𗘒	𗘓	𗘔	𗘕	𗘖	𗘗	𗘘	𗘙	𗘚	𗘛	𗘜	𗘝	𗘞	𗘟
U+1762x	𗘠	𗘡	𗘢	𗘣	𗘤	𗘥	𗘦	𗘧	𗘨	𗘩	𗘪	𗘫	𗘬	𗘭	𗘮	𗘯
U+1763x	𗘰	𗘱	𗘲	𗘳	𗘴	𗘵	𗘶	𗘷	𗘸	𗘹	𗘺	𗘻	𗘼	𗘽	𗘾	𗘿
U+1764x	𗙀	𗙁	𗙂	𗙃	𗙄	𗙅	𗙆	𗙇	𗙈	𗙉	𗙊	𗙋	𗙌	𗙍	𗙎	𗙏
U+1765x	𗙐	𗙑	𗙒	𗙓	𗙔	𗙕	𗙖	𗙗	𗙘	𗙙	𗙚	𗙛	𗙜	𗙝	𗙞	𗙟
U+1766x	𗙠	𗙡	𗙢	𗙣	𗙤	𗙥	𗙦	𗙧	𗙨	𗙩	𗙪	𗙫	𗙬	𗙭	𗙮	𗙯
U+1767x	𗙰	𗙱	𗙲	𗙳	𗙴	𗙵	𗙶	𗙷	𗙸	𗙹	𗙺	𗙻	𗙼	𗙽	𗙾	𗙿
U+1768x	𗚀	𗚁	𗚂	𗚃	𗚄	𗚅	𗚆	𗚇	𗚈	𗚉	𗚊	𗚋	𗚌	𗚍	𗚎	𗚏
U+1769x	𗚐	𗚑	𗚒	𗚓	𗚔	𗚕	𗚖	𗚗	𗚘	𗚙	𗚚	𗚛	𗚜	𗚝	𗚞	𗚟
U+176Ax	𗚠	𗚡	𗚢	𗚣	𗚤	𗚥	𗚦	𗚧	𗚨	𗚩	𗚪	𗚫	𗚬	𗚭	𗚮	𗚯
U+176Bx	𗚰	𗚱	𗚲	𗚳	𗚴	𗚵	𗚶	𗚷	𗚸	𗚹	𗚺	𗚻	𗚼	𗚽	𗚾	𗚿
U+176Cx	𗛀	𗛁	𗛂	𗛃	𗛄	𗛅	𗛆	𗛇	𗛈	𗛉	𗛊	𗛋	𗛌	𗛍	𗛎	𗛏
U+176Dx	𗛐	𗛑	𗛒	𗛓	𗛔	𗛕	𗛖	𗛗	𗛘	𗛙	𗛚	𗛛	𗛜	𗛝	𗛞	𗛟
U+176Ex	𗛠	𗛡	𗛢	𗛣	𗛤	𗛥	𗛦	𗛧	𗛨	𗛩	𗛪	𗛫	𗛬	𗛭	𗛮	𗛯
U+176Fx	𗛰	𗛱	𗛲	𗛳	𗛴	𗛵	𗛶	𗛷	𗛸	𗛹	𗛺	𗛻	𗛼	𗛽	𗛾	𗛿
U+1770x	𗜀	𗜁	𗜂	𗜃	𗜄	𗜅	𗜆	𗜇	𗜈	𗜉	𗜊	𗜋	𗜌	𗜍	𗜎	𗜏
U+1771x	𗜐	𗜑	𗜒	𗜓	𗜔	𗜕	𗜖	𗜗	𗜘	𗜙	𗜚	𗜛	𗜜	𗜝	𗜞	𗜟
U+1772x	𗜠	𗜡	𗜢	𗜣	𗜤	𗜥	𗜦	𗜧	𗜨	𗜩	𗜪	𗜫	𗜬	𗜭	𗜮	𗜯
U+1773x	𗜰	𗜱	𗜲	𗜳	𗜴	𗜵	𗜶	𗜷	𗜸	𗜹	𗜺	𗜻	𗜼	𗜽	𗜾	𗜿
U+1774x	𗝀	𗝁	𗝂	𗝃	𗝄	𗝅	𗝆	𗝇	𗝈	𗝉	𗝊	𗝋	𗝌	𗝍	𗝎	𗝏
U+1775x	𗝐	𗝑	𗝒	𗝓	𗝔	𗝕	𗝖	𗝗	𗝘	𗝙	𗝚	𗝛	𗝜	𗝝	𗝞	𗝟
U+1776x	𗝠	𗝡	𗝢	𗝣	𗝤	𗝥	𗝦	𗝧	𗝨	𗝩	𗝪	𗝫	𗝬	𗝭	𗝮	𗝯
U+1777x	𗝰	𗝱	𗝲	𗝳	𗝴	𗝵	𗝶	𗝷	𗝸	𗝹	𗝺	𗝻	𗝼	𗝽	𗝾	𗝿
U+1778x	𗞀	𗞁	𗞂	𗞃	𗞄	𗞅	𗞆	𗞇	𗞈	𗞉	𗞊	𗞋	𗞌	𗞍	𗞎	𗞏
U+1779x	𗞐	𗞑	𗞒	𗞓	𗞔	𗞕	𗞖	𗞗	𗞘	𗞙	𗞚	𗞛	𗞜	𗞝	𗞞	𗞟
U+177Ax	𗞠	𗞡	𗞢	𗞣	𗞤	𗞥	𗞦	𗞧	𗞨	𗞩	𗞪	𗞫	𗞬	𗞭	𗞮	𗞯
U+177Bx	𗞰	𗞱	𗞲	𗞳	𗞴	𗞵	𗞶	𗞷	𗞸	𗞹	𗞺	𗞻	𗞼	𗞽	𗞾	𗞿
U+177Cx	𗟀	𗟁	𗟂	𗟃	𗟄	𗟅	𗟆	𗟇	𗟈	𗟉	𗟊	𗟋	𗟌	𗟍	𗟎	𗟏
U+177Dx	𗟐	𗟑	𗟒	𗟓	𗟔	𗟕	𗟖	𗟗	𗟘	𗟙	𗟚	𗟛	𗟜	𗟝	𗟞	𗟟
U+177Ex	𗟠	𗟡	𗟢	𗟣	𗟤	𗟥	𗟦	𗟧	𗟨	𗟩	𗟪	𗟫	𗟬	𗟭	𗟮	𗟯
U+177Fx	𗟰	𗟱	𗟲	𗟳	𗟴	𗟵	𗟶	𗟷	𗟸	𗟹	𗟺	𗟻	𗟼	𗟽	𗟾	𗟿
U+1780x	𗠀	𗠁	𗠂	𗠃	𗠄	𗠅	𗠆	𗠇	𗠈	𗠉	𗠊	𗠋	𗠌	𗠍	𗠎	𗠏
U+1781x	𗠐	𗠑	𗠒	𗠓	𗠔	𗠕	𗠖	𗠗	𗠘	𗠙	𗠚	𗠛	𗠜	𗠝	𗠞	𗠟
U+1782x	𗠠	𗠡	𗠢	𗠣	𗠤	𗠥	𗠦	𗠧	𗠨	𗠩	𗠪	𗠫	𗠬	𗠭	𗠮	𗠯
U+1783x	𗠰	𗠱	𗠲	𗠳	𗠴	𗠵	𗠶	𗠷	𗠸	𗠹	𗠺	𗠻	𗠼	𗠽	𗠾	𗠿
U+1784x	𗡀	𗡁	𗡂	𗡃	𗡄	𗡅	𗡆	𗡇	𗡈	𗡉	𗡊	𗡋	𗡌	𗡍	𗡎	𗡏
U+1785x	𗡐	𗡑	𗡒	𗡓	𗡔	𗡕	𗡖	𗡗	𗡘	𗡙	𗡚	𗡛	𗡜	𗡝	𗡞	𗡟
U+1786x	𗡠	𗡡	𗡢	𗡣	𗡤	𗡥	𗡦	𗡧	𗡨	𗡩	𗡪	𗡫	𗡬	𗡭	𗡮	𗡯
U+1787x	𗡰	𗡱	𗡲	𗡳	𗡴	𗡵	𗡶	𗡷	𗡸	𗡹	𗡺	𗡻	𗡼	𗡽	𗡾	𗡿
U+1788x	𗢀	𗢁	𗢂	𗢃	𗢄	𗢅	𗢆	𗢇	𗢈	𗢉	𗢊	𗢋	𗢌	𗢍	𗢎	𗢏
U+1789x	𗢐	𗢑	𗢒	𗢓	𗢔	𗢕	𗢖	𗢗	𗢘	𗢙	𗢚	𗢛	𗢜	𗢝	𗢞	𗢟
U+178Ax	𗢠	𗢡	𗢢	𗢣	𗢤	𗢥	𗢦	𗢧	𗢨	𗢩	𗢪	𗢫	𗢬	𗢭	𗢮	𗢯
U+178Bx	𗢰	𗢱	𗢲	𗢳	𗢴	𗢵	𗢶	𗢷	𗢸	𗢹	𗢺	𗢻	𗢼	𗢽	𗢾	𗢿
U+178Cx	𗣀	𗣁	𗣂	𗣃	𗣄	𗣅	𗣆	𗣇	𗣈	𗣉	𗣊	𗣋	𗣌	𗣍	𗣎	𗣏
U+178Dx	𗣐	𗣑	𗣒	𗣓	𗣔	𗣕	𗣖	𗣗	𗣘	𗣙	𗣚	𗣛	𗣜	𗣝	𗣞	𗣟
U+178Ex	𗣠	𗣡	𗣢	𗣣	𗣤	𗣥	𗣦	𗣧	𗣨	𗣩	𗣪	𗣫	𗣬	𗣭	𗣮	𗣯
U+178Fx	𗣰	𗣱	𗣲	𗣳	𗣴	𗣵	𗣶	𗣷	𗣸	𗣹	𗣺	𗣻	𗣼	𗣽	𗣾	𗣿
U+1790x	𗤀	𗤁	𗤂	𗤃	𗤄	𗤅	𗤆	𗤇	𗤈	𗤉	𗤊	𗤋	𗤌	𗤍	𗤎	𗤏
U+1791x	𗤐	𗤑	𗤒	𗤓	𗤔	𗤕	𗤖	𗤗	𗤘	𗤙	𗤚	𗤛	𗤜	𗤝	𗤞	𗤟
U+1792x	𗤠	𗤡	𗤢	𗤣	𗤤	𗤥	𗤦	𗤧	𗤨	𗤩	𗤪	𗤫	𗤬	𗤭	𗤮	𗤯
U+1793x	𗤰	𗤱	𗤲	𗤳	𗤴	𗤵	𗤶	𗤷	𗤸	𗤹	𗤺	𗤻	𗤼	𗤽	𗤾	𗤿
U+1794x	𗥀	𗥁	𗥂	𗥃	𗥄	𗥅	𗥆	𗥇	𗥈	𗥉	𗥊	𗥋	𗥌	𗥍	𗥎	𗥏
U+1795x	𗥐	𗥑	𗥒	𗥓	𗥔	𗥕	𗥖	𗥗	𗥘	𗥙	𗥚	𗥛	𗥜	𗥝	𗥞	𗥟
U+1796x	𗥠	𗥡	𗥢	𗥣	𗥤	𗥥	𗥦	𗥧	𗥨	𗥩	𗥪	𗥫	𗥬	𗥭	𗥮	𗥯
U+1797x	𗥰	𗥱	𗥲	𗥳	𗥴	𗥵	𗥶	𗥷	𗥸	𗥹	𗥺	𗥻	𗥼	𗥽	𗥾	𗥿
U+1798x	𗦀	𗦁	𗦂	𗦃	𗦄	𗦅	𗦆	𗦇	𗦈	𗦉	𗦊	𗦋	𗦌	𗦍	𗦎	𗦏
U+1799x	𗦐	𗦑	𗦒	𗦓	𗦔	𗦕	𗦖	𗦗	𗦘	𗦙	𗦚	𗦛	𗦜	𗦝	𗦞	𗦟
U+179Ax	𗦠	𗦡	𗦢	𗦣	𗦤	𗦥	𗦦	𗦧	𗦨	𗦩	𗦪	𗦫	𗦬	𗦭	𗦮	𗦯
U+179Bx	𗦰	𗦱	𗦲	𗦳	𗦴	𗦵	𗦶	𗦷	𗦸	𗦹	𗦺	𗦻	𗦼	𗦽	𗦾	𗦿
U+179Cx	𗧀	𗧁	𗧂	𗧃	𗧄	𗧅	𗧆	𗧇	𗧈	𗧉	𗧊	𗧋	𗧌	𗧍	𗧎	𗧏
U+179Dx	𗧐	𗧑	𗧒	𗧓	𗧔	𗧕	𗧖	𗧗	𗧘	𗧙	𗧚	𗧛	𗧜	𗧝	𗧞	𗧟
U+179Ex	𗧠	𗧡	𗧢	𗧣	𗧤	𗧥	𗧦	𗧧	𗧨	𗧩	𗧪	𗧫	𗧬	𗧭	𗧮	𗧯
U+179Fx	𗧰	𗧱	𗧲	𗧳	𗧴	𗧵	𗧶	𗧷	𗧸	𗧹	𗧺	𗧻	𗧼	𗧽	𗧾	𗧿
U+17A0x	𗨀	𗨁	𗨂	𗨃	𗨄	𗨅	𗨆	𗨇	𗨈	𗨉	𗨊	𗨋	𗨌	𗨍	𗨎	𗨏
U+17A1x	𗨐	𗨑	𗨒	𗨓	𗨔	𗨕	𗨖	𗨗	𗨘	𗨙	𗨚	𗨛	𗨜	𗨝	𗨞	𗨟
U+17A2x	𗨠	𗨡	𗨢	𗨣	𗨤	𗨥	𗨦	𗨧	𗨨	𗨩	𗨪	𗨫	𗨬	𗨭	𗨮	𗨯
U+17A3x	𗨰	𗨱	𗨲	𗨳	𗨴	𗨵	𗨶	𗨷	𗨸	𗨹	𗨺	𗨻	𗨼	𗨽	𗨾	𗨿
U+17A4x	𗩀	𗩁	𗩂	𗩃	𗩄	𗩅	𗩆	𗩇	𗩈	𗩉	𗩊	𗩋	𗩌	𗩍	𗩎	𗩏
U+17A5x	𗩐	𗩑	𗩒	𗩓	𗩔	𗩕	𗩖	𗩗	𗩘	𗩙	𗩚	𗩛	𗩜	𗩝	𗩞	𗩟
U+17A6x	𗩠	𗩡	𗩢	𗩣	𗩤	𗩥	𗩦	𗩧	𗩨	𗩩	𗩪	𗩫	𗩬	𗩭	𗩮	𗩯
U+17A7x	𗩰	𗩱	𗩲	𗩳	𗩴	𗩵	𗩶	𗩷	𗩸	𗩹	𗩺	𗩻	𗩼	𗩽	𗩾	𗩿
U+17A8x	𗪀	𗪁	𗪂	𗪃	𗪄	𗪅	𗪆	𗪇	𗪈	𗪉	𗪊	𗪋	𗪌	𗪍	𗪎	𗪏
U+17A9x	𗪐	𗪑	𗪒	𗪓	𗪔	𗪕	𗪖	𗪗	𗪘	𗪙	𗪚	𗪛	𗪜	𗪝	𗪞	𗪟
U+17AAx	𗪠	𗪡	𗪢	𗪣	𗪤	𗪥	𗪦	𗪧	𗪨	𗪩	𗪪	𗪫	𗪬	𗪭	𗪮	𗪯
U+17ABx	𗪰	𗪱	𗪲	𗪳	𗪴	𗪵	𗪶	𗪷	𗪸	𗪹	𗪺	𗪻	𗪼	𗪽	𗪾	𗪿
U+17ACx	𗫀	𗫁	𗫂	𗫃	𗫄	𗫅	𗫆	𗫇	𗫈	𗫉	𗫊	𗫋	𗫌	𗫍	𗫎	𗫏
U+17ADx	𗫐	𗫑	𗫒	𗫓	𗫔	𗫕	𗫖	𗫗	𗫘	𗫙	𗫚	𗫛	𗫜	𗫝	𗫞	𗫟
U+17AEx	𗫠	𗫡	𗫢	𗫣	𗫤	𗫥	𗫦	𗫧	𗫨	𗫩	𗫪	𗫫	𗫬	𗫭	𗫮	𗫯
U+17AFx	𗫰	𗫱	𗫲	𗫳	𗫴	𗫵	𗫶	𗫷	𗫸	𗫹	𗫺	𗫻	𗫼	𗫽	𗫾	𗫿
U+17B0x	𗬀	𗬁	𗬂	𗬃	𗬄	𗬅	𗬆	𗬇	𗬈	𗬉	𗬊	𗬋	𗬌	𗬍	𗬎	𗬏
U+17B1x	𗬐	𗬑	𗬒	𗬓	𗬔	𗬕	𗬖	𗬗	𗬘	𗬙	𗬚	𗬛	𗬜	𗬝	𗬞	𗬟
U+17B2x	𗬠	𗬡	𗬢	𗬣	𗬤	𗬥	𗬦	𗬧	𗬨	𗬩	𗬪	𗬫	𗬬	𗬭	𗬮	𗬯
U+17B3x	𗬰	𗬱	𗬲	𗬳	𗬴	𗬵	𗬶	𗬷	𗬸	𗬹	𗬺	𗬻	𗬼	𗬽	𗬾	𗬿
U+17B4x	𗭀	𗭁	𗭂	𗭃	𗭄	𗭅	𗭆	𗭇	𗭈	𗭉	𗭊	𗭋	𗭌	𗭍	𗭎	𗭏
U+17B5x	𗭐	𗭑	𗭒	𗭓	𗭔	𗭕	𗭖	𗭗	𗭘	𗭙	𗭚	𗭛	𗭜	𗭝	𗭞	𗭟
U+17B6x	𗭠	𗭡	𗭢	𗭣	𗭤	𗭥	𗭦	𗭧	𗭨	𗭩	𗭪	𗭫	𗭬	𗭭	𗭮	𗭯
U+17B7x	𗭰	𗭱	𗭲	𗭳	𗭴	𗭵	𗭶	𗭷	𗭸	𗭹	𗭺	𗭻	𗭼	𗭽	𗭾	𗭿
U+17B8x	𗮀	𗮁	𗮂	𗮃	𗮄	𗮅	𗮆	𗮇	𗮈	𗮉	𗮊	𗮋	𗮌	𗮍	𗮎	𗮏
U+17B9x	𗮐	𗮑	𗮒	𗮓	𗮔	𗮕	𗮖	𗮗	𗮘	𗮙	𗮚	𗮛	𗮜	𗮝	𗮞	𗮟
U+17BAx	𗮠	𗮡	𗮢	𗮣	𗮤	𗮥	𗮦	𗮧	𗮨	𗮩	𗮪	𗮫	𗮬	𗮭	𗮮	𗮯
U+17BBx	𗮰	𗮱	𗮲	𗮳	𗮴	𗮵	𗮶	𗮷	𗮸	𗮹	𗮺	𗮻	𗮼	𗮽	𗮾	𗮿
U+17BCx	𗯀	𗯁	𗯂	𗯃	𗯄	𗯅	𗯆	𗯇	𗯈	𗯉	𗯊	𗯋	𗯌	𗯍	𗯎	𗯏
U+17BDx	𗯐	𗯑	𗯒	𗯓	𗯔	𗯕	𗯖	𗯗	𗯘	𗯙	𗯚	𗯛	𗯜	𗯝	𗯞	𗯟
U+17BEx	𗯠	𗯡	𗯢	𗯣	𗯤	𗯥	𗯦	𗯧	𗯨	𗯩	𗯪	𗯫	𗯬	𗯭	𗯮	𗯯
U+17BFx	𗯰	𗯱	𗯲	𗯳	𗯴	𗯵	𗯶	𗯷	𗯸	𗯹	𗯺	𗯻	𗯼	𗯽	𗯾	𗯿
U+17C0x	𗰀	𗰁	𗰂	𗰃	𗰄	𗰅	𗰆	𗰇	𗰈	𗰉	𗰊	𗰋	𗰌	𗰍	𗰎	𗰏
U+17C1x	𗰐	𗰑	𗰒	𗰓	𗰔	𗰕	𗰖	𗰗	𗰘	𗰙	𗰚	𗰛	𗰜	𗰝	𗰞	𗰟
U+17C2x	𗰠	𗰡	𗰢	𗰣	𗰤	𗰥	𗰦	𗰧	𗰨	𗰩	𗰪	𗰫	𗰬	𗰭	𗰮	𗰯
U+17C3x	𗰰	𗰱	𗰲	𗰳	𗰴	𗰵	𗰶	𗰷	𗰸	𗰹	𗰺	𗰻	𗰼	𗰽	𗰾	𗰿
U+17C4x	𗱀	𗱁	𗱂	𗱃	𗱄	𗱅	𗱆	𗱇	𗱈	𗱉	𗱊	𗱋	𗱌	𗱍	𗱎	𗱏
U+17C5x	𗱐	𗱑	𗱒	𗱓	𗱔	𗱕	𗱖	𗱗	𗱘	𗱙	𗱚	𗱛	𗱜	𗱝	𗱞	𗱟
U+17C6x	𗱠	𗱡	𗱢	𗱣	𗱤	𗱥	𗱦	𗱧	𗱨	𗱩	𗱪	𗱫	𗱬	𗱭	𗱮	𗱯
U+17C7x	𗱰	𗱱	𗱲	𗱳	𗱴	𗱵	𗱶	𗱷	𗱸	𗱹	𗱺	𗱻	𗱼	𗱽	𗱾	𗱿
U+17C8x	𗲀	𗲁	𗲂	𗲃	𗲄	𗲅	𗲆	𗲇	𗲈	𗲉	𗲊	𗲋	𗲌	𗲍	𗲎	𗲏
U+17C9x	𗲐	𗲑	𗲒	𗲓	𗲔	𗲕	𗲖	𗲗	𗲘	𗲙	𗲚	𗲛	𗲜	𗲝	𗲞	𗲟
U+17CAx	𗲠	𗲡	𗲢	𗲣	𗲤	𗲥	𗲦	𗲧	𗲨	𗲩	𗲪	𗲫	𗲬	𗲭	𗲮	𗲯
U+17CBx	𗲰	𗲱	𗲲	𗲳	𗲴	𗲵	𗲶	𗲷	𗲸	𗲹	𗲺	𗲻	𗲼	𗲽	𗲾	𗲿
U+17CCx	𗳀	𗳁	𗳂	𗳃	𗳄	𗳅	𗳆	𗳇	𗳈	𗳉	𗳊	𗳋	𗳌	𗳍	𗳎	𗳏
U+17CDx	𗳐	𗳑	𗳒	𗳓	𗳔	𗳕	𗳖	𗳗	𗳘	𗳙	𗳚	𗳛	𗳜	𗳝	𗳞	𗳟
U+17CEx	𗳠	𗳡	𗳢	𗳣	𗳤	𗳥	𗳦	𗳧	𗳨	𗳩	𗳪	𗳫	𗳬	𗳭	𗳮	𗳯
U+17CFx	𗳰	𗳱	𗳲	𗳳	𗳴	𗳵	𗳶	𗳷	𗳸	𗳹	𗳺	𗳻	𗳼	𗳽	𗳾	𗳿
U+17D0x	𗴀	𗴁	𗴂	𗴃	𗴄	𗴅	𗴆	𗴇	𗴈	𗴉	𗴊	𗴋	𗴌	𗴍	𗴎	𗴏
U+17D1x	𗴐	𗴑	𗴒	𗴓	𗴔	𗴕	𗴖	𗴗	𗴘	𗴙	𗴚	𗴛	𗴜	𗴝	𗴞	𗴟
U+17D2x	𗴠	𗴡	𗴢	𗴣	𗴤	𗴥	𗴦	𗴧	𗴨	𗴩	𗴪	𗴫	𗴬	𗴭	𗴮	𗴯
U+17D3x	𗴰	𗴱	𗴲	𗴳	𗴴	𗴵	𗴶	𗴷	𗴸	𗴹	𗴺	𗴻	𗴼	𗴽	𗴾	𗴿
U+17D4x	𗵀	𗵁	𗵂	𗵃	𗵄	𗵅	𗵆	𗵇	𗵈	𗵉	𗵊	𗵋	𗵌	𗵍	𗵎	𗵏
U+17D5x	𗵐	𗵑	𗵒	𗵓	𗵔	𗵕	𗵖	𗵗	𗵘	𗵙	𗵚	𗵛	𗵜	𗵝	𗵞	𗵟
U+17D6x	𗵠	𗵡	𗵢	𗵣	𗵤	𗵥	𗵦	𗵧	𗵨	𗵩	𗵪	𗵫	𗵬	𗵭	𗵮	𗵯
U+17D7x	𗵰	𗵱	𗵲	𗵳	𗵴	𗵵	𗵶	𗵷	𗵸	𗵹	𗵺	𗵻	𗵼	𗵽	𗵾	𗵿
U+17D8x	𗶀	𗶁	𗶂	𗶃	𗶄	𗶅	𗶆	𗶇	𗶈	𗶉	𗶊	𗶋	𗶌	𗶍	𗶎	𗶏
U+17D9x	𗶐	𗶑	𗶒	𗶓	𗶔	𗶕	𗶖	𗶗	𗶘	𗶙	𗶚	𗶛	𗶜	𗶝	𗶞	𗶟
U+17DAx	𗶠	𗶡	𗶢	𗶣	𗶤	𗶥	𗶦	𗶧	𗶨	𗶩	𗶪	𗶫	𗶬	𗶭	𗶮	𗶯
U+17DBx	𗶰	𗶱	𗶲	𗶳	𗶴	𗶵	𗶶	𗶷	𗶸	𗶹	𗶺	𗶻	𗶼	𗶽	𗶾	𗶿
U+17DCx	𗷀	𗷁	𗷂	𗷃	𗷄	𗷅	𗷆	𗷇	𗷈	𗷉	𗷊	𗷋	𗷌	𗷍	𗷎	𗷏
U+17DDx	𗷐	𗷑	𗷒	𗷓	𗷔	𗷕	𗷖	𗷗	𗷘	𗷙	𗷚	𗷛	𗷜	𗷝	𗷞	𗷟
U+17DEx	𗷠	𗷡	𗷢	𗷣	𗷤	𗷥	𗷦	𗷧	𗷨	𗷩	𗷪	𗷫	𗷬	𗷭	𗷮	𗷯
U+17DFx	𗷰	𗷱	𗷲	𗷳	𗷴	𗷵	𗷶	𗷷	𗷸	𗷹	𗷺	𗷻	𗷼	𗷽	𗷾	𗷿
U+17E0x	𗸀	𗸁	𗸂	𗸃	𗸄	𗸅	𗸆	𗸇	𗸈	𗸉	𗸊	𗸋	𗸌	𗸍	𗸎	𗸏
U+17E1x	𗸐	𗸑	𗸒	𗸓	𗸔	𗸕	𗸖	𗸗	𗸘	𗸙	𗸚	𗸛	𗸜	𗸝	𗸞	𗸟
U+17E2x	𗸠	𗸡	𗸢	𗸣	𗸤	𗸥	𗸦	𗸧	𗸨	𗸩	𗸪	𗸫	𗸬	𗸭	𗸮	𗸯
U+17E3x	𗸰	𗸱	𗸲	𗸳	𗸴	𗸵	𗸶	𗸷	𗸸	𗸹	𗸺	𗸻	𗸼	𗸽	𗸾	𗸿
U+17E4x	𗹀	𗹁	𗹂	𗹃	𗹄	𗹅	𗹆	𗹇	𗹈	𗹉	𗹊	𗹋	𗹌	𗹍	𗹎	𗹏
U+17E5x	𗹐	𗹑	𗹒	𗹓	𗹔	𗹕	𗹖	𗹗	𗹘	𗹙	𗹚	𗹛	𗹜	𗹝	𗹞	𗹟
U+17E6x	𗹠	𗹡	𗹢	𗹣	𗹤	𗹥	𗹦	𗹧	𗹨	𗹩	𗹪	𗹫	𗹬	𗹭	𗹮	𗹯
U+17E7x	𗹰	𗹱	𗹲	𗹳	𗹴	𗹵	𗹶	𗹷	𗹸	𗹹	𗹺	𗹻	𗹼	𗹽	𗹾	𗹿
U+17E8x	𗺀	𗺁	𗺂	𗺃	𗺄	𗺅	𗺆	𗺇	𗺈	𗺉	𗺊	𗺋	𗺌	𗺍	𗺎	𗺏
U+17E9x	𗺐	𗺑	𗺒	𗺓	𗺔	𗺕	𗺖	𗺗	𗺘	𗺙	𗺚	𗺛	𗺜	𗺝	𗺞	𗺟
U+17EAx	𗺠	𗺡	𗺢	𗺣	𗺤	𗺥	𗺦	𗺧	𗺨	𗺩	𗺪	𗺫	𗺬	𗺭	𗺮	𗺯
U+17EBx	𗺰	𗺱	𗺲	𗺳	𗺴	𗺵	𗺶	𗺷	𗺸	𗺹	𗺺	𗺻	𗺼	𗺽	𗺾	𗺿
U+17ECx	𗻀	𗻁	𗻂	𗻃	𗻄	𗻅	𗻆	𗻇	𗻈	𗻉	𗻊	𗻋	𗻌	𗻍	𗻎	𗻏
U+17EDx	𗻐	𗻑	𗻒	𗻓	𗻔	𗻕	𗻖	𗻗	𗻘	𗻙	𗻚	𗻛	𗻜	𗻝	𗻞	𗻟
U+17EEx	𗻠	𗻡	𗻢	𗻣	𗻤	𗻥	𗻦	𗻧	𗻨	𗻩	𗻪	𗻫	𗻬	𗻭	𗻮	𗻯
U+17EFx	𗻰	𗻱	𗻲	𗻳	𗻴	𗻵	𗻶	𗻷	𗻸	𗻹	𗻺	𗻻	𗻼	𗻽	𗻾	𗻿
U+17F0x	𗼀	𗼁	𗼂	𗼃	𗼄	𗼅	𗼆	𗼇	𗼈	𗼉	𗼊	𗼋	𗼌	𗼍	𗼎	𗼏
U+17F1x	𗼐	𗼑	𗼒	𗼓	𗼔	𗼕	𗼖	𗼗	𗼘	𗼙	𗼚	𗼛	𗼜	𗼝	𗼞	𗼟
U+17F2x	𗼠	𗼡	𗼢	𗼣	𗼤	𗼥	𗼦	𗼧	𗼨	𗼩	𗼪	𗼫	𗼬	𗼭	𗼮	𗼯
U+17F3x	𗼰	𗼱	𗼲	𗼳	𗼴	𗼵	𗼶	𗼷	𗼸	𗼹	𗼺	𗼻	𗼼	𗼽	𗼾	𗼿
U+17F4x	𗽀	𗽁	𗽂	𗽃	𗽄	𗽅	𗽆	𗽇	𗽈	𗽉	𗽊	𗽋	𗽌	𗽍	𗽎	𗽏
U+17F5x	𗽐	𗽑	𗽒	𗽓	𗽔	𗽕	𗽖	𗽗	𗽘	𗽙	𗽚	𗽛	𗽜	𗽝	𗽞	𗽟
U+17F6x	𗽠	𗽡	𗽢	𗽣	𗽤	𗽥	𗽦	𗽧	𗽨	𗽩	𗽪	𗽫	𗽬	𗽭	𗽮	𗽯
U+17F7x	𗽰	𗽱	𗽲	𗽳	𗽴	𗽵	𗽶	𗽷	𗽸	𗽹	𗽺	𗽻	𗽼	𗽽	𗽾	𗽿
U+17F8x	𗾀	𗾁	𗾂	𗾃	𗾄	𗾅	𗾆	𗾇	𗾈	𗾉	𗾊	𗾋	𗾌	𗾍	𗾎	𗾏
U+17F9x	𗾐	𗾑	𗾒	𗾓	𗾔	𗾕	𗾖	𗾗	𗾘	𗾙	𗾚	𗾛	𗾜	𗾝	𗾞	𗾟
U+17FAx	𗾠	𗾡	𗾢	𗾣	𗾤	𗾥	𗾦	𗾧	𗾨	𗾩	𗾪	𗾫	𗾬	𗾭	𗾮	𗾯
U+17FBx	𗾰	𗾱	𗾲	𗾳	𗾴	𗾵	𗾶	𗾷	𗾸	𗾹	𗾺	𗾻	𗾼	𗾽	𗾾	𗾿
U+17FCx	𗿀	𗿁	𗿂	𗿃	𗿄	𗿅	𗿆	𗿇	𗿈	𗿉	𗿊	𗿋	𗿌	𗿍	𗿎	𗿏
U+17FDx	𗿐	𗿑	𗿒	𗿓	𗿔	𗿕	𗿖	𗿗	𗿘	𗿙	𗿚	𗿛	𗿜	𗿝	𗿞	𗿟
U+17FEx	𗿠	𗿡	𗿢	𗿣	𗿤	𗿥	𗿦	𗿧	𗿨	𗿩	𗿪	𗿫	𗿬	𗿭	𗿮	𗿯
U+17FFx	𗿰	𗿱	𗿲	𗿳	𗿴	𗿵	𗿶	𗿷	𗿸	𗿹	𗿺	𗿻	𗿼	𗿽	𗿾	𗿿
U+1800x	𘀀	𘀁	𘀂	𘀃	𘀄	𘀅	𘀆	𘀇	𘀈	𘀉	𘀊	𘀋	𘀌	𘀍	𘀎	𘀏
U+1801x	𘀐	𘀑	𘀒	𘀓	𘀔	𘀕	𘀖	𘀗	𘀘	𘀙	𘀚	𘀛	𘀜	𘀝	𘀞	𘀟
U+1802x	𘀠	𘀡	𘀢	𘀣	𘀤	𘀥	𘀦	𘀧	𘀨	𘀩	𘀪	𘀫	𘀬	𘀭	𘀮	𘀯
U+1803x	𘀰	𘀱	𘀲	𘀳	𘀴	𘀵	𘀶	𘀷	𘀸	𘀹	𘀺	𘀻	𘀼	𘀽	𘀾	𘀿
U+1804x	𘁀	𘁁	𘁂	𘁃	𘁄	𘁅	𘁆	𘁇	𘁈	𘁉	𘁊	𘁋	𘁌	𘁍	𘁎	𘁏
U+1805x	𘁐	𘁑	𘁒	𘁓	𘁔	𘁕	𘁖	𘁗	𘁘	𘁙	𘁚	𘁛	𘁜	𘁝	𘁞	𘁟
U+1806x	𘁠	𘁡	𘁢	𘁣	𘁤	𘁥	𘁦	𘁧	𘁨	𘁩	𘁪	𘁫	𘁬	𘁭	𘁮	𘁯
U+1807x	𘁰	𘁱	𘁲	𘁳	𘁴	𘁵	𘁶	𘁷	𘁸	𘁹	𘁺	𘁻	𘁼	𘁽	𘁾	𘁿
U+1808x	𘂀	𘂁	𘂂	𘂃	𘂄	𘂅	𘂆	𘂇	𘂈	𘂉	𘂊	𘂋	𘂌	𘂍	𘂎	𘂏
U+1809x	𘂐	𘂑	𘂒	𘂓	𘂔	𘂕	𘂖	𘂗	𘂘	𘂙	𘂚	𘂛	𘂜	𘂝	𘂞	𘂟
U+180Ax	𘂠	𘂡	𘂢	𘂣	𘂤	𘂥	𘂦	𘂧	𘂨	𘂩	𘂪	𘂫	𘂬	𘂭	𘂮	𘂯
U+180Bx	𘂰	𘂱	𘂲	𘂳	𘂴	𘂵	𘂶	𘂷	𘂸	𘂹	𘂺	𘂻	𘂼	𘂽	𘂾	𘂿
U+180Cx	𘃀	𘃁	𘃂	𘃃	𘃄	𘃅	𘃆	𘃇	𘃈	𘃉	𘃊	𘃋	𘃌	𘃍	𘃎	𘃏
U+180Dx	𘃐	𘃑	𘃒	𘃓	𘃔	𘃕	𘃖	𘃗	𘃘	𘃙	𘃚	𘃛	𘃜	𘃝	𘃞	𘃟
U+180Ex	𘃠	𘃡	𘃢	𘃣	𘃤	𘃥	𘃦	𘃧	𘃨	𘃩	𘃪	𘃫	𘃬	𘃭	𘃮	𘃯
U+180Fx	𘃰	𘃱	𘃲	𘃳	𘃴	𘃵	𘃶	𘃷	𘃸	𘃹	𘃺	𘃻	𘃼	𘃽	𘃾	𘃿
U+1810x	𘄀	𘄁	𘄂	𘄃	𘄄	𘄅	𘄆	𘄇	𘄈	𘄉	𘄊	𘄋	𘄌	𘄍	𘄎	𘄏
U+1811x	𘄐	𘄑	𘄒	𘄓	𘄔	𘄕	𘄖	𘄗	𘄘	𘄙	𘄚	𘄛	𘄜	𘄝	𘄞	𘄟
U+1812x	𘄠	𘄡	𘄢	𘄣	𘄤	𘄥	𘄦	𘄧	𘄨	𘄩	𘄪	𘄫	𘄬	𘄭	𘄮	𘄯
U+1813x	𘄰	𘄱	𘄲	𘄳	𘄴	𘄵	𘄶	𘄷	𘄸	𘄹	𘄺	𘄻	𘄼	𘄽	𘄾	𘄿
U+1814x	𘅀	𘅁	𘅂	𘅃	𘅄	𘅅	𘅆	𘅇	𘅈	𘅉	𘅊	𘅋	𘅌	𘅍	𘅎	𘅏
U+1815x	𘅐	𘅑	𘅒	𘅓	𘅔	𘅕	𘅖	𘅗	𘅘	𘅙	𘅚	𘅛	𘅜	𘅝	𘅞	𘅟
U+1816x	𘅠	𘅡	𘅢	𘅣	𘅤	𘅥	𘅦	𘅧	𘅨	𘅩	𘅪	𘅫	𘅬	𘅭	𘅮	𘅯
U+1817x	𘅰	𘅱	𘅲	𘅳	𘅴	𘅵	𘅶	𘅷	𘅸	𘅹	𘅺	𘅻	𘅼	𘅽	𘅾	𘅿
U+1818x	𘆀	𘆁	𘆂	𘆃	𘆄	𘆅	𘆆	𘆇	𘆈	𘆉	𘆊	𘆋	𘆌	𘆍	𘆎	𘆏
U+1819x	𘆐	𘆑	𘆒	𘆓	𘆔	𘆕	𘆖	𘆗	𘆘	𘆙	𘆚	𘆛	𘆜	𘆝	𘆞	𘆟
U+181Ax	𘆠	𘆡	𘆢	𘆣	𘆤	𘆥	𘆦	𘆧	𘆨	𘆩	𘆪	𘆫	𘆬	𘆭	𘆮	𘆯
U+181Bx	𘆰	𘆱	𘆲	𘆳	𘆴	𘆵	𘆶	𘆷	𘆸	𘆹	𘆺	𘆻	𘆼	𘆽	𘆾	𘆿
U+181Cx	𘇀	𘇁	𘇂	𘇃	𘇄	𘇅	𘇆	𘇇	𘇈	𘇉	𘇊	𘇋	𘇌	𘇍	𘇎	𘇏
U+181Dx	𘇐	𘇑	𘇒	𘇓	𘇔	𘇕	𘇖	𘇗	𘇘	𘇙	𘇚	𘇛	𘇜	𘇝	𘇞	𘇟
U+181Ex	𘇠	𘇡	𘇢	𘇣	𘇤	𘇥	𘇦	𘇧	𘇨	𘇩	𘇪	𘇫	𘇬	𘇭	𘇮	𘇯
U+181Fx	𘇰	𘇱	𘇲	𘇳	𘇴	𘇵	𘇶	𘇷	𘇸	𘇹	𘇺	𘇻	𘇼	𘇽	𘇾	𘇿
U+1820x	𘈀	𘈁	𘈂	𘈃	𘈄	𘈅	𘈆	𘈇	𘈈	𘈉	𘈊	𘈋	𘈌	𘈍	𘈎	𘈏
U+1821x	𘈐	𘈑	𘈒	𘈓	𘈔	𘈕	𘈖	𘈗	𘈘	𘈙	𘈚	𘈛	𘈜	𘈝	𘈞	𘈟
U+1822x	𘈠	𘈡	𘈢	𘈣	𘈤	𘈥	𘈦	𘈧	𘈨	𘈩	𘈪	𘈫	𘈬	𘈭	𘈮	𘈯
U+1823x	𘈰	𘈱	𘈲	𘈳	𘈴	𘈵	𘈶	𘈷	𘈸	𘈹	𘈺	𘈻	𘈼	𘈽	𘈾	𘈿
U+1824x	𘉀	𘉁	𘉂	𘉃	𘉄	𘉅	𘉆	𘉇	𘉈	𘉉	𘉊	𘉋	𘉌	𘉍	𘉎	𘉏
U+1825x	𘉐	𘉑	𘉒	𘉓	𘉔	𘉕	𘉖	𘉗	𘉘	𘉙	𘉚	𘉛	𘉜	𘉝	𘉞	𘉟
U+1826x	𘉠	𘉡	𘉢	𘉣	𘉤	𘉥	𘉦	𘉧	𘉨	𘉩	𘉪	𘉫	𘉬	𘉭	𘉮	𘉯
U+1827x	𘉰	𘉱	𘉲	𘉳	𘉴	𘉵	𘉶	𘉷	𘉸	𘉹	𘉺	𘉻	𘉼	𘉽	𘉾	𘉿
U+1828x	𘊀	𘊁	𘊂	𘊃	𘊄	𘊅	𘊆	𘊇	𘊈	𘊉	𘊊	𘊋	𘊌	𘊍	𘊎	𘊏
U+1829x	𘊐	𘊑	𘊒	𘊓	𘊔	𘊕	𘊖	𘊗	𘊘	𘊙	𘊚	𘊛	𘊜	𘊝	𘊞	𘊟
U+182Ax	𘊠	𘊡	𘊢	𘊣	𘊤	𘊥	𘊦	𘊧	𘊨	𘊩	𘊪	𘊫	𘊬	𘊭	𘊮	𘊯
U+182Bx	𘊰	𘊱	𘊲	𘊳	𘊴	𘊵	𘊶	𘊷	𘊸	𘊹	𘊺	𘊻	𘊼	𘊽	𘊾	𘊿
U+182Cx	𘋀	𘋁	𘋂	𘋃	𘋄	𘋅	𘋆	𘋇	𘋈	𘋉	𘋊	𘋋	𘋌	𘋍	𘋎	𘋏
U+182Dx	𘋐	𘋑	𘋒	𘋓	𘋔	𘋕	𘋖	𘋗	𘋘	𘋙	𘋚	𘋛	𘋜	𘋝	𘋞	𘋟
U+182Ex	𘋠	𘋡	𘋢	𘋣	𘋤	𘋥	𘋦	𘋧	𘋨	𘋩	𘋪	𘋫	𘋬	𘋭	𘋮	𘋯
U+182Fx	𘋰	𘋱	𘋲	𘋳	𘋴	𘋵	𘋶	𘋷	𘋸	𘋹	𘋺	𘋻	𘋼	𘋽	𘋾	𘋿
U+1830x	𘌀	𘌁	𘌂	𘌃	𘌄	𘌅	𘌆	𘌇	𘌈	𘌉	𘌊	𘌋	𘌌	𘌍	𘌎	𘌏
U+1831x	𘌐	𘌑	𘌒	𘌓	𘌔	𘌕	𘌖	𘌗	𘌘	𘌙	𘌚	𘌛	𘌜	𘌝	𘌞	𘌟
U+1832x	𘌠	𘌡	𘌢	𘌣	𘌤	𘌥	𘌦	𘌧	𘌨	𘌩	𘌪	𘌫	𘌬	𘌭	𘌮	𘌯
U+1833x	𘌰	𘌱	𘌲	𘌳	𘌴	𘌵	𘌶	𘌷	𘌸	𘌹	𘌺	𘌻	𘌼	𘌽	𘌾	𘌿
U+1834x	𘍀	𘍁	𘍂	𘍃	𘍄	𘍅	𘍆	𘍇	𘍈	𘍉	𘍊	𘍋	𘍌	𘍍	𘍎	𘍏
U+1835x	𘍐	𘍑	𘍒	𘍓	𘍔	𘍕	𘍖	𘍗	𘍘	𘍙	𘍚	𘍛	𘍜	𘍝	𘍞	𘍟
U+1836x	𘍠	𘍡	𘍢	𘍣	𘍤	𘍥	𘍦	𘍧	𘍨	𘍩	𘍪	𘍫	𘍬	𘍭	𘍮	𘍯
U+1837x	𘍰	𘍱	𘍲	𘍳	𘍴	𘍵	𘍶	𘍷	𘍸	𘍹	𘍺	𘍻	𘍼	𘍽	𘍾	𘍿
U+1838x	𘎀	𘎁	𘎂	𘎃	𘎄	𘎅	𘎆	𘎇	𘎈	𘎉	𘎊	𘎋	𘎌	𘎍	𘎎	𘎏
U+1839x	𘎐	𘎑	𘎒	𘎓	𘎔	𘎕	𘎖	𘎗	𘎘	𘎙	𘎚	𘎛	𘎜	𘎝	𘎞	𘎟
U+183Ax	𘎠	𘎡	𘎢	𘎣	𘎤	𘎥	𘎦	𘎧	𘎨	𘎩	𘎪	𘎫	𘎬	𘎭	𘎮	𘎯
U+183Bx	𘎰	𘎱	𘎲	𘎳	𘎴	𘎵	𘎶	𘎷	𘎸	𘎹	𘎺	𘎻	𘎼	𘎽	𘎾	𘎿
U+183Cx	𘏀	𘏁	𘏂	𘏃	𘏄	𘏅	𘏆	𘏇	𘏈	𘏉	𘏊	𘏋	𘏌	𘏍	𘏎	𘏏
U+183Dx	𘏐	𘏑	𘏒	𘏓	𘏔	𘏕	𘏖	𘏗	𘏘	𘏙	𘏚	𘏛	𘏜	𘏝	𘏞	𘏟
U+183Ex	𘏠	𘏡	𘏢	𘏣	𘏤	𘏥	𘏦	𘏧	𘏨	𘏩	𘏪	𘏫	𘏬	𘏭	𘏮	𘏯
U+183Fx	𘏰	𘏱	𘏲	𘏳	𘏴	𘏵	𘏶	𘏷	𘏸	𘏹	𘏺	𘏻	𘏼	𘏽	𘏾	𘏿
U+1840x	𘐀	𘐁	𘐂	𘐃	𘐄	𘐅	𘐆	𘐇	𘐈	𘐉	𘐊	𘐋	𘐌	𘐍	𘐎	𘐏
U+1841x	𘐐	𘐑	𘐒	𘐓	𘐔	𘐕	𘐖	𘐗	𘐘	𘐙	𘐚	𘐛	𘐜	𘐝	𘐞	𘐟
U+1842x	𘐠	𘐡	𘐢	𘐣	𘐤	𘐥	𘐦	𘐧	𘐨	𘐩	𘐪	𘐫	𘐬	𘐭	𘐮	𘐯
U+1843x	𘐰	𘐱	𘐲	𘐳	𘐴	𘐵	𘐶	𘐷	𘐸	𘐹	𘐺	𘐻	𘐼	𘐽	𘐾	𘐿
U+1844x	𘑀	𘑁	𘑂	𘑃	𘑄	𘑅	𘑆	𘑇	𘑈	𘑉	𘑊	𘑋	𘑌	𘑍	𘑎	𘑏
U+1845x	𘑐	𘑑	𘑒	𘑓	𘑔	𘑕	𘑖	𘑗	𘑘	𘑙	𘑚	𘑛	𘑜	𘑝	𘑞	𘑟
U+1846x	𘑠	𘑡	𘑢	𘑣	𘑤	𘑥	𘑦	𘑧	𘑨	𘑩	𘑪	𘑫	𘑬	𘑭	𘑮	𘑯
U+1847x	𘑰	𘑱	𘑲	𘑳	𘑴	𘑵	𘑶	𘑷	𘑸	𘑹	𘑺	𘑻	𘑼	𘑽	𘑾	𘑿
U+1848x	𘒀	𘒁	𘒂	𘒃	𘒄	𘒅	𘒆	𘒇	𘒈	𘒉	𘒊	𘒋	𘒌	𘒍	𘒎	𘒏
U+1849x	𘒐	𘒑	𘒒	𘒓	𘒔	𘒕	𘒖	𘒗	𘒘	𘒙	𘒚	𘒛	𘒜	𘒝	𘒞	𘒟
U+184Ax	𘒠	𘒡	𘒢	𘒣	𘒤	𘒥	𘒦	𘒧	𘒨	𘒩	𘒪	𘒫	𘒬	𘒭	𘒮	𘒯
U+184Bx	𘒰	𘒱	𘒲	𘒳	𘒴	𘒵	𘒶	𘒷	𘒸	𘒹	𘒺	𘒻	𘒼	𘒽	𘒾	𘒿
U+184Cx	𘓀	𘓁	𘓂	𘓃	𘓄	𘓅	𘓆	𘓇	𘓈	𘓉	𘓊	𘓋	𘓌	𘓍	𘓎	𘓏
U+184Dx	𘓐	𘓑	𘓒	𘓓	𘓔	𘓕	𘓖	𘓗	𘓘	𘓙	𘓚	𘓛	𘓜	𘓝	𘓞	𘓟
U+184Ex	𘓠	𘓡	𘓢	𘓣	𘓤	𘓥	𘓦	𘓧	𘓨	𘓩	𘓪	𘓫	𘓬	𘓭	𘓮	𘓯
U+184Fx	𘓰	𘓱	𘓲	𘓳	𘓴	𘓵	𘓶	𘓷	𘓸	𘓹	𘓺	𘓻	𘓼	𘓽	𘓾	𘓿
U+1850x	𘔀	𘔁	𘔂	𘔃	𘔄	𘔅	𘔆	𘔇	𘔈	𘔉	𘔊	𘔋	𘔌	𘔍	𘔎	𘔏
U+1851x	𘔐	𘔑	𘔒	𘔓	𘔔	𘔕	𘔖	𘔗	𘔘	𘔙	𘔚	𘔛	𘔜	𘔝	𘔞	𘔟
U+1852x	𘔠	𘔡	𘔢	𘔣	𘔤	𘔥	𘔦	𘔧	𘔨	𘔩	𘔪	𘔫	𘔬	𘔭	𘔮	𘔯
U+1853x	𘔰	𘔱	𘔲	𘔳	𘔴	𘔵	𘔶	𘔷	𘔸	𘔹	𘔺	𘔻	𘔼	𘔽	𘔾	𘔿
U+1854x	𘕀	𘕁	𘕂	𘕃	𘕄	𘕅	𘕆	𘕇	𘕈	𘕉	𘕊	𘕋	𘕌	𘕍	𘕎	𘕏
U+1855x	𘕐	𘕑	𘕒	𘕓	𘕔	𘕕	𘕖	𘕗	𘕘	𘕙	𘕚	𘕛	𘕜	𘕝	𘕞	𘕟
U+1856x	𘕠	𘕡	𘕢	𘕣	𘕤	𘕥	𘕦	𘕧	𘕨	𘕩	𘕪	𘕫	𘕬	𘕭	𘕮	𘕯
U+1857x	𘕰	𘕱	𘕲	𘕳	𘕴	𘕵	𘕶	𘕷	𘕸	𘕹	𘕺	𘕻	𘕼	𘕽	𘕾	𘕿
U+1858x	𘖀	𘖁	𘖂	𘖃	𘖄	𘖅	𘖆	𘖇	𘖈	𘖉	𘖊	𘖋	𘖌	𘖍	𘖎	𘖏
U+1859x	𘖐	𘖑	𘖒	𘖓	𘖔	𘖕	𘖖	𘖗	𘖘	𘖙	𘖚	𘖛	𘖜	𘖝	𘖞	𘖟
U+185Ax	𘖠	𘖡	𘖢	𘖣	𘖤	𘖥	𘖦	𘖧	𘖨	𘖩	𘖪	𘖫	𘖬	𘖭	𘖮	𘖯
U+185Bx	𘖰	𘖱	𘖲	𘖳	𘖴	𘖵	𘖶	𘖷	𘖸	𘖹	𘖺	𘖻	𘖼	𘖽	𘖾	𘖿
U+185Cx	𘗀	𘗁	𘗂	𘗃	𘗄	𘗅	𘗆	𘗇	𘗈	𘗉	𘗊	𘗋	𘗌	𘗍	𘗎	𘗏
U+185Dx	𘗐	𘗑	𘗒	𘗓	𘗔	𘗕	𘗖	𘗗	𘗘	𘗙	𘗚	𘗛	𘗜	𘗝	𘗞	𘗟
U+185Ex	𘗠	𘗡	𘗢	𘗣	𘗤	𘗥	𘗦	𘗧	𘗨	𘗩	𘗪	𘗫	𘗬	𘗭	𘗮	𘗯
U+185Fx	𘗰	𘗱	𘗲	𘗳	𘗴	𘗵	𘗶	𘗷	𘗸	𘗹	𘗺	𘗻	𘗼	𘗽	𘗾	𘗿
U+1860x	𘘀	𘘁	𘘂	𘘃	𘘄	𘘅	𘘆	𘘇	𘘈	𘘉	𘘊	𘘋	𘘌	𘘍	𘘎	𘘏
U+1861x	𘘐	𘘑	𘘒	𘘓	𘘔	𘘕	𘘖	𘘗	𘘘	𘘙	𘘚	𘘛	𘘜	𘘝	𘘞	𘘟
U+1862x	𘘠	𘘡	𘘢	𘘣	𘘤	𘘥	𘘦	𘘧	𘘨	𘘩	𘘪	𘘫	𘘬	𘘭	𘘮	𘘯
U+1863x	𘘰	𘘱	𘘲	𘘳	𘘴	𘘵	𘘶	𘘷	𘘸	𘘹	𘘺	𘘻	𘘼	𘘽	𘘾	𘘿
U+1864x	𘙀	𘙁	𘙂	𘙃	𘙄	𘙅	𘙆	𘙇	𘙈	𘙉	𘙊	𘙋	𘙌	𘙍	𘙎	𘙏
U+1865x	𘙐	𘙑	𘙒	𘙓	𘙔	𘙕	𘙖	𘙗	𘙘	𘙙	𘙚	𘙛	𘙜	𘙝	𘙞	𘙟
U+1866x	𘙠	𘙡	𘙢	𘙣	𘙤	𘙥	𘙦	𘙧	𘙨	𘙩	𘙪	𘙫	𘙬	𘙭	𘙮	𘙯
U+1867x	𘙰	𘙱	𘙲	𘙳	𘙴	𘙵	𘙶	𘙷	𘙸	𘙹	𘙺	𘙻	𘙼	𘙽	𘙾	𘙿
U+1868x	𘚀	𘚁	𘚂	𘚃	𘚄	𘚅	𘚆	𘚇	𘚈	𘚉	𘚊	𘚋	𘚌	𘚍	𘚎	𘚏
U+1869x	𘚐	𘚑	𘚒	𘚓	𘚔	𘚕	𘚖	𘚗	𘚘	𘚙	𘚚	𘚛	𘚜	𘚝	𘚞	𘚟
U+186Ax	𘚠	𘚡	𘚢	𘚣	𘚤	𘚥	𘚦	𘚧	𘚨	𘚩	𘚪	𘚫	𘚬	𘚭	𘚮	𘚯
U+186Bx	𘚰	𘚱	𘚲	𘚳	𘚴	𘚵	𘚶	𘚷	𘚸	𘚹	𘚺	𘚻	𘚼	𘚽	𘚾	𘚿
U+186Cx	𘛀	𘛁	𘛂	𘛃	𘛄	𘛅	𘛆	𘛇	𘛈	𘛉	𘛊	𘛋	𘛌	𘛍	𘛎	𘛏
U+186Dx	𘛐	𘛑	𘛒	𘛓	𘛔	𘛕	𘛖	𘛗	𘛘	𘛙	𘛚	𘛛	𘛜	𘛝	𘛞	𘛟
U+186Ex	𘛠	𘛡	𘛢	𘛣	𘛤	𘛥	𘛦	𘛧	𘛨	𘛩	𘛪	𘛫	𘛬	𘛭	𘛮	𘛯
U+186Fx	𘛰	𘛱	𘛲	𘛳	𘛴	𘛵	𘛶	𘛷	𘛸	𘛹	𘛺	𘛻	𘛼	𘛽	𘛾	𘛿
U+1870x	𘜀	𘜁	𘜂	𘜃	𘜄	𘜅	𘜆	𘜇	𘜈	𘜉	𘜊	𘜋	𘜌	𘜍	𘜎	𘜏
U+1871x	𘜐	𘜑	𘜒	𘜓	𘜔	𘜕	𘜖	𘜗	𘜘	𘜙	𘜚	𘜛	𘜜	𘜝	𘜞	𘜟
U+1872x	𘜠	𘜡	𘜢	𘜣	𘜤	𘜥	𘜦	𘜧	𘜨	𘜩	𘜪	𘜫	𘜬	𘜭	𘜮	𘜯
U+1873x	𘜰	𘜱	𘜲	𘜳	𘜴	𘜵	𘜶	𘜷	𘜸	𘜹	𘜺	𘜻	𘜼	𘜽	𘜾	𘜿
U+1874x	𘝀	𘝁	𘝂	𘝃	𘝄	𘝅	𘝆	𘝇	𘝈	𘝉	𘝊	𘝋	𘝌	𘝍	𘝎	𘝏
U+1875x	𘝐	𘝑	𘝒	𘝓	𘝔	𘝕	𘝖	𘝗	𘝘	𘝙	𘝚	𘝛	𘝜	𘝝	𘝞	𘝟
U+1876x	𘝠	𘝡	𘝢	𘝣	𘝤	𘝥	𘝦	𘝧	𘝨	𘝩	𘝪	𘝫	𘝬	𘝭	𘝮	𘝯
U+1877x	𘝰	𘝱	𘝲	𘝳	𘝴	𘝵	𘝶	𘝷	𘝸	𘝹	𘝺	𘝻	𘝼	𘝽	𘝾	𘝿
U+1878x	𘞀	𘞁	𘞂	𘞃	𘞄	𘞅	𘞆	𘞇	𘞈	𘞉	𘞊	𘞋	𘞌	𘞍	𘞎	𘞏
U+1879x	𘞐	𘞑	𘞒	𘞓	𘞔	𘞕	𘞖	𘞗	𘞘	𘞙	𘞚	𘞛	𘞜	𘞝	𘞞	𘞟
U+187Ax	𘞠	𘞡	𘞢	𘞣	𘞤	𘞥	𘞦	𘞧	𘞨	𘞩	𘞪	𘞫	𘞬	𘞭	𘞮	𘞯
U+187Bx	𘞰	𘞱	𘞲	𘞳	𘞴	𘞵	𘞶	𘞷	𘞸	𘞹	𘞺	𘞻	𘞼	𘞽	𘞾	𘞿
U+187Cx	𘟀	𘟁	𘟂	𘟃	𘟄	𘟅	𘟆	𘟇	𘟈	𘟉	𘟊	𘟋	𘟌	𘟍	𘟎	𘟏
U+187Dx	𘟐	𘟑	𘟒	𘟓	𘟔	𘟕	𘟖	𘟗	𘟘	𘟙	𘟚	𘟛	𘟜	𘟝	𘟞	𘟟
U+187Ex	𘟠	𘟡	𘟢	𘟣	𘟤	𘟥	𘟦	𘟧	𘟨	𘟩	𘟪	𘟫	𘟬	𘟭	𘟮	𘟯
U+187Fx	𘟰	𘟱	𘟲	𘟳	𘟴	𘟵	𘟶	𘟷	𘟸	𘟹	𘟺	𘟻	𘟼	𘟽	𘟾	𘟿
Notes: 1. As of Unicode version 17.0

== History ==
The following Unicode-related documents record the purpose and process of defining specific characters in the Tangut block:

Version	Final code points (Note: Proposed code points and characters names may differ from final code points and names)	Count	L2 ID	WG2 ID	Document
9.0	U+17000..187EC	6,125		N3353 (pdf, doc)	Umamaheswaran, V. S. (2007-10-10), "M51.28", Unconfirmed minutes of WG 2 meeting 51 Hanzhou, China; 2007-04-24/27
9.0	U+17000..187EC	6,125	L2/07-143	N3297	Cook, Richard (2007-05-09), Proposal to encode Tangut characters in UCS Plane 1
9.0	U+17000..187EC	6,125	L2/07-144	N3297A	Cook, Richard (2007-05-08), Tangut Proposal - Multi Column Chart
9.0	U+17000..187EC	6,125	L2/07-145R	N3297B	Cook, Richard (2007-05-09), Tangut Proposal - Single Column Chart
9.0	U+17000..187EC	6,125	L2/07-229		Cook, Richard (2007-07-23), Tangut Proposal Code Chart Update
9.0	U+17000..187EC	6,125	L2/07-225		Moore, Lisa (2007-08-21), "Tangut", UTC #112 Minutes
9.0	U+17000..187EC	6,125	L2/07-289	N3307	Cook, Richard (2007-09-01), Tangut Background
9.0	U+17000..187EC	6,125	L2/07-301	N3338	Response to UC Berkeley's proposals on Tangut, 2007-09-16
9.0	U+17000..187EC	6,125	L2/07-302	N3343	Cook, Richard (2007-09-17), Expert feedback on Chinese NB input on WG2/N3297 Tangut Encoding Proposal
9.0	U+17000..187EC	6,125	L2/08-175	N3448	Comments on N3297: Proposal to encode Tangut characters, 2008-04-22
9.0	U+17000..187EC	6,125	L2/08-187	N3467	Comments on N3297: Proposal to encode Tangut characters in UCS Plane 1 and charts, 2008-04-22
9.0	U+17000..187EC	6,125	L2/08-259	N3822	Cook, Richard (2008-07-09), Tangut 5 column chart
9.0	U+17000..187EC	6,125	L2/08-318	N3453 (pdf, doc)	Umamaheswaran, V. S. (2008-08-13), "M52.17", Unconfirmed minutes of WG 2 meeting 52
9.0	U+17000..187EC	6,125	L2/08-337	N3496	West, Andrew (2008-09-01), Review of Proposed Tangut Repertoire
9.0	U+17000..187EC	6,125	L2/08-336		Cook, Richard (2008-09-03), Single-Column Tangut Code Chart (using Column G font)
9.0	U+17000..187EC	6,125	L2/08-341	N3498R	Everson, Michael; West, Andrew (2008-09-24), Expert Feedback on the proposed Tangut character set in PDAM 6.2
9.0	U+17000..187EC	6,125	L2/08-349	N3521	Cook, Richard; Lunde, Ken (2008-10-10), The UCS Tangut Repertory
9.0	U+17000..187EC	6,125	L2/08-376	N3539	Response from Tangut scholars of China on the Tangut Unicode proposal, 2008-10-13
9.0	U+17000..187EC	6,125	L2/08-377	N3541	Kolehmainen, Erkki I. (2008-10-13), Report from the Ad Hoc on Tangut
9.0	U+17000..187EC	6,125	L2/08-412	N3553 (pdf, doc)	Umamaheswaran, V. S. (2008-11-05), "M53.10", Unconfirmed minutes of WG 2 meeting 53
9.0	U+17000..187EC	6,125	L2/09-095	N3577	Everson, Michael; Hill, Nathan; Jacques, Guillaume; West, Andrew; Zaytsev, Vlacheslav (2009-03-01), Proposal for a revised Tangut character set for encoding in the SMP of the UCS
9.0	U+17000..187EC	6,125		N3586	Anderson, Deborah; Cook, Richard (2009-03-04), Request for Tangut font and mappings from N3577 to Amendment 7 repertoire
9.0	U+17000..187EC	6,125	L2/09-115	N3577R	Everson, Michael; Hill, Nathan; Jacques, Guillaume; West, Andrew; Zaytsev, Viacheslav (2009-04-08), Proposal for a revised Tangut character set for encoding in the SMP of the UCS
9.0	U+17000..187EC	6,125	L2/09-116	N3577R-A	Everson, Michael; Hill, Nathan; Jacques, Guillaume; West, Andrew; Zaytsev, Viacheslav (2009-04-08), Proposal for a revised Tangut character set for encoding in the SMP of the UCS - Appendix A
9.0	U+17000..187EC	6,125	L2/09-117	N3577R-B	Everson, Michael; Hill, Nathan; Jacques, Guillaume; West, Andrew; Zaytsev, Viacheslav (2009-04-08), Proposal for a revised Tangut character set for encoding in the SMP of the UCS - Appendix B
9.0	U+17000..187EC	6,125	L2/09-169	N3629	Tangut Ad-Hoc Meeting Report, 2009-04-20
9.0	U+17000..187EC	6,125	L2/09-234	N3603 (pdf, doc)	Umamaheswaran, V. S. (2009-07-08), "M54.05", Unconfirmed minutes of WG 2 meeting 54
9.0	U+17000..187EC	6,125	L2/10-095	N3797, N3797-A, N3797-B	Final proposal for encoding the Tangut script in the SMP of the UCS, 2010-04-05
9.0	U+17000..187EC	6,125	L2/10-131	N3821	Anderson, Deborah; Cook, Richard (2010-04-16), Comments on Tangut proposal N3797
9.0	U+17000..187EC	6,125	L2/10-141	N3833	Anderson, Deborah (2010-04-21), Tangut Ad hoc report
9.0	U+17000..187EC	6,125		N3803 (pdf, doc)	"M56.17", Unconfirmed minutes of WG 2 meeting no. 56, 2010-09-24
9.0	U+17000..187EC	6,125	L2/11-214	N4033, N4033A, N4033B	West, Andrew (2011-05-22), Report on Tangut Encoding
9.0	U+17000..187EC	6,125	L2/11-204	N4083	Everson, Michael; West, Andrew (2011-05-26), Tangut chart to supplement N4033 "Report on Tangut Encoding"
9.0	U+17000..187EC	6,125		N4094	Cook, Richard; Anderson, Deborah (2011-06-01), Comments on Tangut report N4033
9.0	U+17000..187EC	6,125	L2/12-313	N4325	West, Andrew; et al. (2012-10-02), Proposal to encode the Tangut script in the UCS
9.0	U+17000..187EC	6,125	L2/12-315	N4327	Everson, Michael; West, Andrew (2012-10-02), Code chart for Tangut ideographs and Tangut radicals
9.0	U+17000..187EC	6,125		N4370 (pdf, doc)	Comments on N4325, 4326 and N4327 (Tangut), 2012-10-20
9.0	U+17000..187EC	6,125		N4455	Explanation on the Re-facture of Tangut Fonts, 2013-06-10
9.0	U+17000..187EC	6,125	L2/13-241	N4516	Anderson, Deborah (2013-12-10), Summary of Tangut meeting (Beijing, China)
9.0	U+17000..187EC	6,125	L2/14-022	N4543	Suignard, Michel (2014-01-12), Character Name considerations
9.0	U+17000..187EC	6,125	L2/14-021	N4525	West, Andrew; Everson, Michael; Xiaomang, Han; Jia, Changye; Jing, Yongshi; Zaytsev, Viacheslav (2014-01-21), Code chart for the Tangut script
9.0	U+17000..187EC	6,125	L2/14-023	N4522	West, Andrew; Everson, Michael; Xiaomang, Han; Jia, Changye; Jing, Yongshi; Zaytsev, Viacheslav (2014-01-21), Proposal to encode the Tangut script in the UCS
9.0	U+17000..187EC	6,125		N4403 (pdf, doc)	Umamaheswaran, V. S. (2014-01-28), "10.2.9 Re-facture of Tangut fonts", Unconfirmed minutes of WG 2 meeting 61, Holiday Inn, Vilnius, Lithuania; 2013-06-10/14
9.0	U+17000..187EC	6,125	L2/14-026		Moore, Lisa (2014-02-17), "C.5.1", UTC #138 Minutes
9.0	U+17000..187EC	6,125	L2/14-100		Moore, Lisa (2014-05-13), "Consensus 139-C17", UTC #139 Minutes
9.0	U+17000..187EC	6,125		N4553 (pdf, doc)	Umamaheswaran, V. S. (2014-09-16), "M62.12a", Minutes of WG 2 meeting 62 Adobe, San Jose, CA, USA
9.0	U+17000..187EC	6,125	L2/14-246	N4642	Anderson, Deborah (2014-09-29), Ad Hoc Reports for Tangut and Khitan Large Script
9.0	U+17000..187EC	6,125		N4640	Reveiw [sic] of N4558R Tangut glyph corrections, 2014-09-29
9.0	U+17000..187EC	6,125	L2/14-209R	N4588R2	West, Andrew; Zaytsev, Viacheslav; Sun, Bojun; Everson, Michael (2014-10-01), Tangut glyph corrections
9.0	U+17000..187EC	6,125	L2/14-268R		Anderson, Deborah; Whistler, Ken; McGowan, Rick; Pournader, Roozbeh; Iancu, Laurențiu; Glass, Andrew; Constable, Peter; Suignard, Michel (2014-10-27), "11. Tangut", Recommendations to UTC #141 October 2014 on Script Proposals
9.0	U+17000..187EC	6,125	L2/14-250		Moore, Lisa (2014-11-10), "Consensus 141-C12", UTC #141 Minutes, "Approve the addition of Tangut character U+17132, glyph corrections, and re-ordering as given in L2/14-209R."
9.0	U+17000..187EC	6,125	L2/14-301	N4650	West, Andrew; Zaytsev, Viacheslav; Everson, Michael (2014-12-01), Discussion of Tangut character L2008-4148
9.0	U+17000..187EC	6,125	L2/15-017		Moore, Lisa (2015-02-12), "C.7.1", UTC #142 Minutes
9.0	U+17000..187EC	6,125	L2/15-175	N4667	West, Andrew; Everson, Michael; Zaytsev, Viacheslav (2015-07-16), Review of Tangut repertoire in DAM ballot
9.0	U+17000..187EC	6,125	L2/16-052	N4603 (pdf, doc)	Umamaheswaran, V. S. (2015-09-01), "M63.03c", Unconfirmed minutes of WG 2 meeting 63
9.0	U+17000..187EC	6,125	L2/15-279	N4684	Reply to WG2N4650 and WG2N4667 on Tangut, 2015-10-13
9.0	U+17000..187EC	6,125	L2/16-112	N4723	West, Andrew; Zaytsev, Viacheslav; Sun, Bojun (2016-04-21), Glyph Corrections for 3 Tangut ideographs
9.0	U+17000..187EC	6,125	L2/16-121		Moore, Lisa (2016-05-20), "Consensus 147-C21", UTC #147 Minutes, "Correct the glyphs for U+17013, U+17712, and U+17D9F based on document L2/16-112 and update Tangut sources as described in section 3 of the document, for Unicode 10.0."
9.0	U+17000..187EC	6,125		N4739	"M64.03b", Unconfirmed minutes of WG 2 meeting 64, 2016-08-31
9.0	U+17000..187EC	6,125	L2/17-313	N4850	West, Andrew; Zaytsev, Viacheslav (2017-09-07), Glyph Corrections for 31 Tangut ideographs and one Tangut component
9.0	U+17000..187EC	6,125	L2/17-367	N4885	Anderson, Deborah; Whistler, Ken; Pournader, Roozbeh; Moore, Lisa (2017-09-18), "2a. Tangut", Comments on WG2 #66 (Sept. 2017) documents
9.0	U+17000..187EC	6,125	L2/17-360	N4896	West, Andrew; Zaytsev, Viacheslav; Sun, Bojun; You, Jerry (2017-09-22), Tangut Character Additions and Glyph Corrections (replaces L2/17-313 and L2/17-314)
9.0	U+17000..187EC	6,125	L2/19-064	N5031	West, Andrew; Zaytsev, Viacheslav (2019-02-11), Investigation of Tangut unification issues
9.0	U+17000..187EC	6,125	L2/19-173		Anderson, Deborah; et al. (2019-04-29), "20. Tangut", Recommendations to UTC #159 April-May 2019 on Script Proposals
9.0	U+17000..187EC	6,125	L2/19-207	N5064	West, Andrew; Zaytsev, Viacheslav; Jia, Changye; Jing, Yongshi; Sun, Bojun (2019-05-27), Proposal to encode nine Tangut ideographs and six Tangut components
9.0	U+17000..187EC	6,125	L2/23-066	N5206	West, Andrew (2023-03-01), Glyph Corrections for Eight Tangut Ideographs [Affects U+17105, 172A4, 17BD1..17BD3, 17EF9, 18136]
9.0	U+17000..187EC	6,125	L2/23-083		Anderson, Deborah; Kučera, Jan; Whistler, Ken; Pournader, Roozbeh; Constable, Peter (2023-04-21), "4 Tangut", Recommendations to UTC #175 April 2023 on Script Proposals
9.0	U+17000..187EC	6,125	L2/23-076		Constable, Peter (2023-05-01), "D.1.1.4", UTC #175 Minutes, "Accept the glyph changes for 7 Tangut ideographs (U+17105, U+172A4, U+17BD1, U+17BD2, U+17BD3, U+17EF9, and U+18136)"
9.0	U+17000..187EC	6,125	L2/23-148	N5237	West, Andrew (2023-06-21), Glyph corrections for four Tangut ideographs [Affects U+17121, 17C51, 17D0B, and 180DF]
9.0	U+17000..187EC	6,125	L2/23-155		West, Andrew (2023-06-28), Evidence for Glyph Forms of U+17121 and U+17C51
9.0	U+17000..187EC	6,125	L2/23-164		Anderson, Deborah; Kučera, Jan; Whistler, Ken; Pournader, Roozbeh; Constable, Peter (2023-07-21), "25 Tangut: Glyph Corrections [Affects U+17121, 17C51, 17D0B, and 180DF]", Recommendations to UTC #176 July 2023 on Script Proposals
9.0	U+17000..187EC	6,125	L2/23-238R		Anderson, Deborah; Kučera, Jan; Whistler, Ken; Pournader, Roozbeh; Constable, Peter (2023-11-01), "5a Glyph corrections [Affects U+17121, 17C51, 17D0B, and 180DF]", Recommendations to UTC #177 November 2023 on Script Proposals
9.0	U+17000..187EC	6,125	L2/23-231		Constable, Peter (2023-12-08), "Section 5a) Tangut glyph corrections [Affects U+17121, 17C51, 17D0B, and 180DF]", UTC #177 Minutes
11.0	U+187ED..187F1	5	L2/16-095	N4724	West, Andrew (2016-04-21), Proposal to encode five additional Tangut ideographs
11.0	U+187ED..187F1	5	L2/16-121		Moore, Lisa (2016-05-20), "C.14.1", UTC #147 Minutes
12.0	U+187F2..187F7	6	L2/17-314	N4851	West, Andrew; Zaytsev, Viacheslav (2017-09-07), Proposal to encode six additional Tangut ideographs
12.0	U+187F2..187F7	6	L2/17-367	N4885	Anderson, Deborah; Whistler, Ken; Pournader, Roozbeh; Moore, Lisa (2017-09-18), "2b. Tangut", Comments on WG2 #66 (Sept. 2017) documents
12.0	U+187F2..187F7	6	L2/17-360	N4896	West, Andrew; Zaytsev, Viacheslav; Sun, Bojun; You, Jerry (2017-09-22), Tangut Character Additions and Glyph Corrections (replaces L2/17-313 and L2/17-314)
12.0	U+187F2..187F7	6		N4953 (pdf, doc)	"M66.19p", Unconfirmed minutes of WG 2 meeting 66, 2018-03-23
12.0	U+187F2..187F7	6	L2/17-362		Moore, Lisa (2018-02-02), "Consensus 153-C12", UTC #153 Minutes
17.0	U+187F8..187FF	8	L2/23-149	N5217	West, Andrew (2023-05-31), Proposal to encode 2 Tangut components and 29 Tangut ideographs
17.0	U+187F8..187FF	8	L2/23-164		Anderson, Deborah; Kučera, Jan; Whistler, Ken; Pournader, Roozbeh; Constable, Peter (2023-07-21), "5 Tangut: Components and Ideographs", Recommendations to UTC #176 July 2023 on Script Proposals
17.0	U+187F8..187FF	8	L2/23-246	N5217R	West, Andrew (2023-10-02), Proposal to encode 2 Tangut components and 28 Tangut ideographs
17.0	U+187F8..187FF	8	L2/23-238R		Anderson, Deborah; Kučera, Jan; Whistler, Ken; Pournader, Roozbeh; Constable, Peter (2023-11-01), "5c Two Tangut Components and 28 Tangut Ideographs", Recommendations to UTC #177 November 2023 on Script Proposals
17.0	U+187F8..187FF	8	L2/23-231		Constable, Peter (2023-12-08), "Consensus 177-C28", UTC #177 Minutes

== See also ==
- Tangut Supplement (Unicode block)
- Tangut Components (Unicode block)
- Tangut Components Supplement (Unicode block)
- Ideographic Symbols and Punctuation (Unicode block)
