= Andrew West (linguist) =

British sinologist (1960–2025)

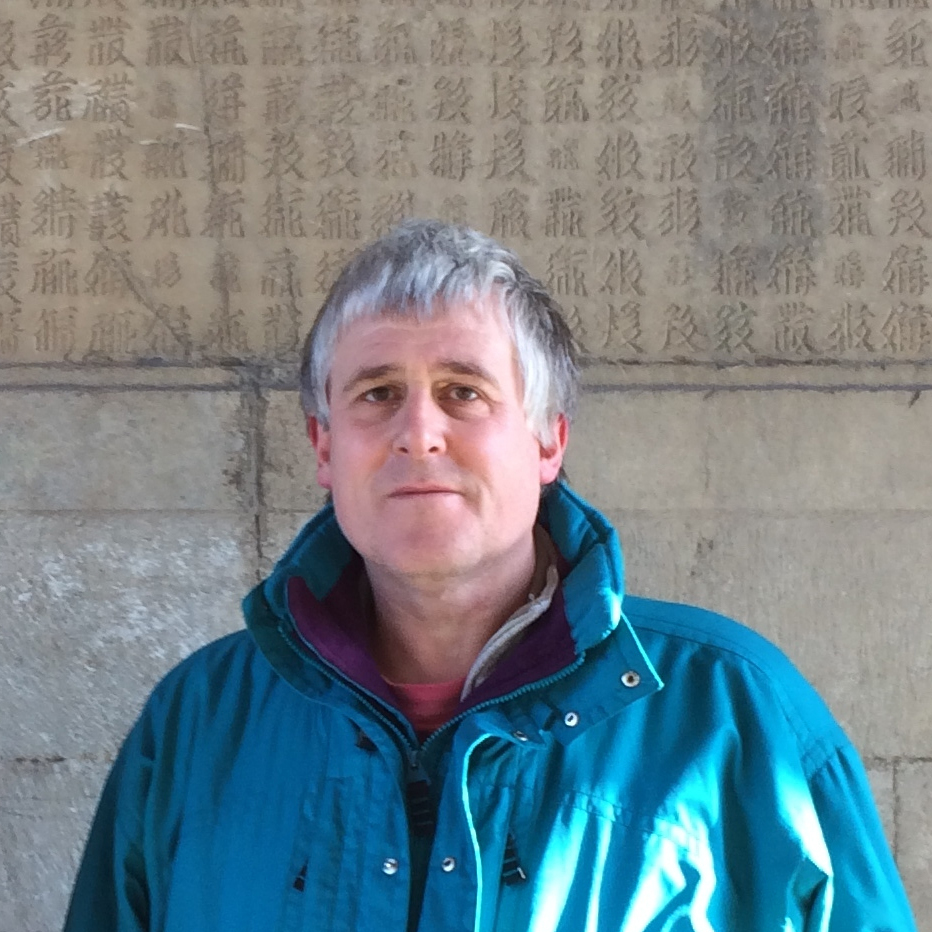
- West in 2013
- Born: Andrew Christopher West; 31 March 1960; Dunfermline, Scotland
- Died: 10 July 2025 (aged 65)

Academic background
- Education: School of Oriental and African Studies (B.A.); Princeton University (Ph.D.)
- Thesis: Quest of the Urtext: The Textual Archaeology of 'The Three Kingdoms' (1993)
- Doctoral advisor: Andrew H. Plaks

Academic work
- Discipline: Sinology
- Institutions: Yale University

Chinese name
- Chinese: 魏安
Transcriptions
Standard Mandarin
- Hanyu Pinyin: Wèi Ān
- IPA: [wêɪ án]
- Website: www.babelstone.co.uk

Andrew Christopher West (Chinese: 魏安; pinyin: Wèi Ān; 31 March 1960 – 10 July 2025) was a British sinologist, linguist and script developer.

== Early life and education ==
West was born in Dunfermline, Scotland to naval officer Dennis West and Shelagh Gardiner. He had two older siblings and one younger. West attended Bishop Vesey's Grammar School in Sutton Coldfield, England. He began his studies at the University of Leicester but withdrew after the first year. He later graduated with a Bachelor of Arts (BA) in Far East studies from SOAS University of London in 1988, a Master of Arts (MA) and PhD from Princeton University, and a Master of Science (MSc) in Software Engineering from the University of Westminster.

== Career ==
West's first works concerned Chinese novels of the Ming and Qing dynasties. His study of Romance of the Three Kingdoms used a new approach to analyse the relationship among the various versions, extrapolating the original text of that novel.

West compiled a catalogue for the Chinese-language library of the English missionary Robert Morrison containing 893 books representing in total some 10,000 string-bound fascicules.

His subsequent work was in the minority languages of China, especially Khitan, Manchu, and Mongolian. He proposed an encoding scheme for the 'Phags-pa script, which was subsequently included in Unicode version 5.0.

West also worked to encode gaming symbols and phonetic characters to the UCS, and worked on encodings for Tangut and Jurchen.

=== Software ===
West was the developer of a number of software products and fonts for Microsoft Windows, including BabelPad and BabelMap.

BabelPad is a Unicode text editor with various tools for entering characters and performing text conversions such as normalization and Unicode casing. BabelPad also supports a wide range of encodings, and has input methods for entering Chinese, Mongolian, Manchu, Tibetan, Uyghur and Yi text, as well as for entering individual Unicode characters by their hexadecimal code point value.

BabelMap is a Unicode character map application that supports all Unicode blocks and characters, and includes various utilities such as pinyin and radical lookup tools for entering Chinese characters.

== Death ==
West died from a heart attack on 10 July 2025, aged 65. Robert Bickers wrote his obituary for the Guardian.

== Works ==
- 1996. Sānguó yǎnyì bǎnběn kǎo 三國演義版本考 [A study of the editions of Romance of the Three Kingdoms]. Shanghai: Shanghai Classics Publishing House. ISBN 7-5325-2023-4
- 1998. Catalogue of the Morrison Collection of Chinese Books (馬禮遜藏書書目). London: SOAS. ISBN 0-7286-0292-X
- 2012. "Musical Notation for Flute in Tangut Manuscripts". In Irina Fedorovna Popova (ed.), Тангуты в Центральной Азии: сборник статей в честь 80-летия проф. Е.И.Кычанова [Tanguts in Central Asia: a collection of articles marking the 80th anniversary of Prof. E. I. Kychanov] pp. 443–453. Moscow: Oriental Literature. ISBN 978-5-02-036505-6
- 2016. Gerard Clauson's Skeleton Tangut (Hsi Hsia) Dictionary: A facsimile edition. With an introduction by Imre Galambos. With Editorial notes and an Index by Andrew West. Prepared for publication by Michael Everson. Portlaoise: Evertype. ISBN 978-1-78201-167-5.

== See also ==
- List of Wikipedia people
