= Ksenia Kepping =

Russian linguist

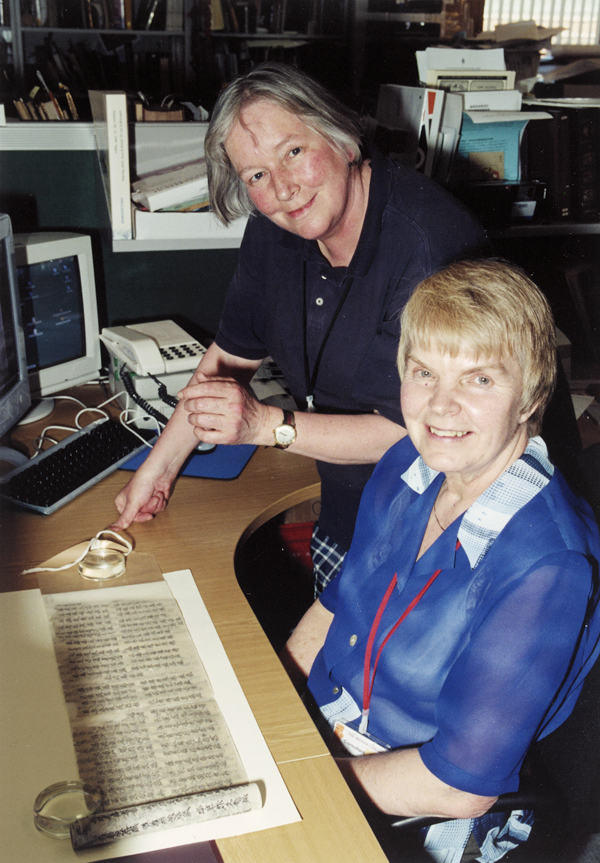
Ksenia Kepping (seated) of the Institute of Oriental Studies, St. Petersburg during her visit to the British Library in March 2001, with Frances Wood, Head of the Chinese Section

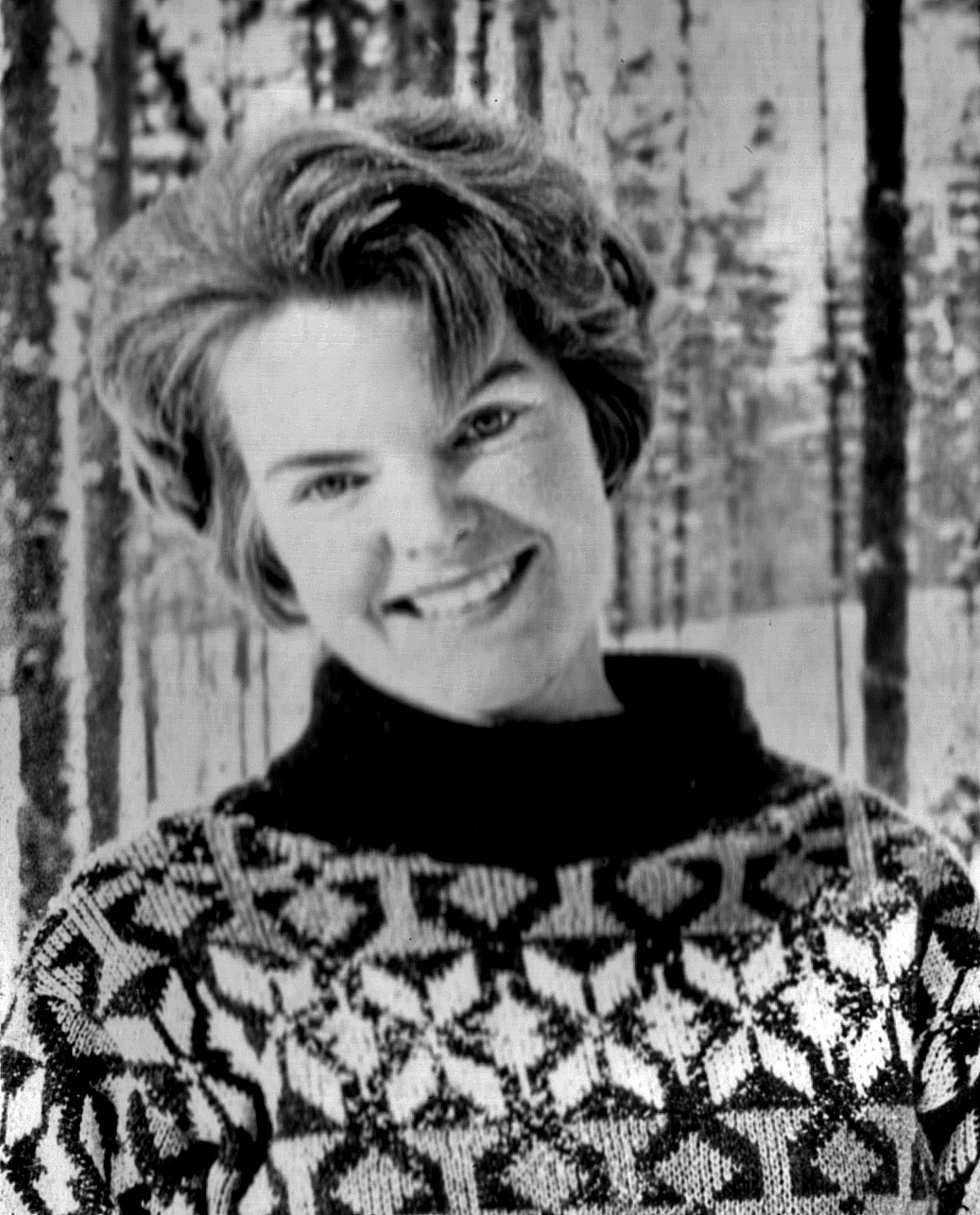
Ksenia Kepping on a ski trip north of Leningrad, winter 1965

Ksenia Borisovna Kepping (Russian: Ксе́ния Бори́совна Ке́пинг, Chinese: 克平; pinyin: Kè Píng, 7 February 1937 – 13 December 2002) was a Russian Tangutologist, known principally for her study of Tangut (or Mi-nia) grammar. (Note: In her writings Kepping refers to the Tangut people and Tangut language as "Mi-nia" 𗼎𗾧 (corresponding to the Tibetan term Mi-nyag, and Chinese term Míyào 彌藥) rather than "Tangut".) She is also known for her theories on the tantric nature of the Tangut state, and for her proposition of the existence of two contrasting forms of Tangut language, the common language used in most surviving Tangut texts, and a ritual language preserved only in a few ritual odes.

== Biography ==
Kepping was born in Tianjin, China on 7 February 1937. Her father, Boris Mikhailovich von Kepping (1896–1958), had been an officer in the White Army who lived in Harbin in north-east China after the Russian Civil War (1917–1923). He subsequently married Olga Viktorovna Svyatina (1900–1992), and moved to Tianjin where her brother, the future Metropolitan Viktor (Leonid Viktorovich Svyatin, 1893–1966), was a priest (he was later appointed Bishop of Beijing and head of the Russian Spiritual Mission in China).

Kepping grew up in Tianjin, and from 1945 to 1954 she was educated at a Russian school in Tianjin. During her childhood in China she learnt to speak the local Tianjin dialect of Chinese fluently. In 1955 the Russian Spiritual Mission was closed, and Kepping's family were voluntarily repatriated to the Soviet Union. Her uncle Viktor was appointed Archbishop of Krasnodar and Kuban, while her parents were sent to Central Asia. She was initially admitted into the Central Asian State University in Tashkent, but with help from her uncle she was able to transfer to the prestigious Leningrad State University in Leningrad. She studied Chinese Philology at the Faculty of Oriental Studies from 1955 to 1959, and after graduation she joined the Leningrad Branch of the Institute of Oriental Studies, where she remained until her death in 2002.

The Institute of Oriental Studies holds the world's largest collection of Tangut texts, which had been collected from the abandoned fortress city of Khara-Khoto by Pyotr Kuzmich Kozlov in 1908, but after the execution in 1937 of the two pioneering scholars of Tangut, Aleksei Ivanovich Ivanov and Nikolai Aleksandrovich Nevsky, Tangut studies had come to a halt in the Soviet Union. During the late 1950s the study of Tangut was revived under Evgenij Ivanovich Kychanov, and from 1966 Kepping started to study the extinct Tangut language and its complex script for her doctorate, focussing in particular on Tangut grammar. In 1969 she completed her doctoral dissertation, "Textological and Grammatical Research into the Tangut Translation of the Chinese Military Treatise Sun Tzu along with Commentaries by Three Authors", which was the basis for a study of the Tangut translation of Sun Tzu that was published in 1979. In 1969 she also co-edited the first scholarly edition of the Tangut rime dictionary, the Sea of Characters, and subsequently published studies of other Tangut texts, including the Forest of Categories (1983), Newly Acquired Notes on Love to the Juniors and Respect to the Seniors (1990), and The General's Garden (2003). In 1986 she was awarded the post-doctoral Doctor of Sciences degree with a dissertation on Tangut morphology.

During the 1980s and 1990s, Kepping travelled abroad extensively and collaborated with scholars from other countries, including George van Driem, with whom she worked on studies of the Tangut verb and Tibetan transcriptions of Tangut, and Tibetologist Christopher Beckwith. During 1989–1990 she spent a year at the Minzu University of China in Beijing, where she worked with Chinese Tangutologists, including as Shi Jinbo, Bai Bin and Li Fanwen. During her time in China she recorded a series of lessons on Russian and Tangut for broadcast on Chinese radio and television. She also made several visits to the British Library in London to study the Tangut fragments from Khara-Khoto brought back by Aurel Stein.

== Tangut scholarship ==
Kepping was the principal advocate of the theory that Tantric Buddhism was the state religion of the Tangut kingdom, and she suggested that tantric rites performed by the Emperor and Empress, as sacred personifications of the male and female principles, were central to the functioning of the state.

In 1986 Japanese Tangutologist Nishida Tatsuo had noted that certain ritual Tangut odes are written using two different sets of vocabularies, which he suggested reflected the languages of two ethnic groups, a sedentary, agriculturalist population known as the "red-faced people", and a nomadic elite, known as the "black-headed people", who he thought were the ruling class of Tangut society. In a paper presented to a conference on Sino-Tibetan languages and linguistics in 1996, Kepping built on Nishida's work, formulating the terms "common language" and "ritual language" to refer to the two different forms of vocabulary. The "common language" was the ordinary Tangut language used in the vast majority of surviving Tangut texts, both secular and religious, but which only comprises about half of the nearly 6,000 Tangut characters given in Tangut dictionaries. On the other hand, the "ritual language" is composed of characters that are only found in dictionaries and a few odes. According to Kepping this ritual language was an artificial language without any grammatical morphemes which was created for ritual purposes by shamans at a time prior to the adoption of Buddhism by the Tangut people, and is only preserved in a few ancient ritual odes.

== Works ==
- 1969. With V. S. Kolokolov, E. I. Kychanov, and A. P. Terentev Katanskij. Море письмен [Sea of characters]. Moscow: Nauka.
- 1979. Сунь Цзы в тангутском переводе. Факсимиле ксилографа [Sunzi in Tangut translation]. Moscow: Nauka.
- 1983. Лес категорий [Forest of Categories]. Moscow: Nauka.
- 1985. Тангутский язык: Морфология [The Morphology of the Tangut Language]. Moscow: Nauka.
- 1989. "西夏語的結構" [The structure of the Tangut language]. In Zhongguo Minzushi Yanjiu [Studies on the history of the nationalities of China]. Beijing: Zhongyang Minzu Xueyuan Chubanshe.
- 1991. With George van Driem. "The Tibetan transcriptions of Tangut (Hsi-hsia) ideograms". In Linguistics of the Tibeto-Burman Area 14.1:117–128.
- 1994. "The conjugation of the Tangut verb". In Bulletin of the School of Oriental and African Studies 1994.2: 339–346.
- 1995. "The Official Name of the Tangut Empire as Reflected in the Native Tangut Texts". In Manuscripta Orientalia vol.1 no.3 (December 1995): 22–32.
- 1996. "Tangut Ritual Language". Paper presented at the 29th International conference on Sino-Tibetan languages and linguistics, Leiden, 10–13 October 1996.
- 1998. "The famous Liangzhou bilingual stele". In T’oung Pao vol.84: 356–379.
- 2000. "The Verb in Tangut". Paper presented at the 9th seminar of the International Association for Tibetan Studies, Leiden, 2000.
- 2001. "'Mi-nia': Self-appellation and Self-portraiture in Khara Khoto Materials". In Manuscripta Orientalia vol.7 no.4 (December 2001): 37–47.
- 2001. "Chinggis Khan's Name Encrypted in a Tangut Song". In IDP News no.19 (Winter 2001): 2–3.
- 2002. With Christopher I. Beckwith. "A preliminary glossary of Tangut from the Tibetan transcriptions". In Medieval Tibeto-Burman languages. Leiden, 2002.
- 2002. "The Autumn Wind by Han Wu-di in the Mi-nia Translation". In Manuscripta Orientalia vol.8 no.2 (June 2002): 36–51.
- 2003. "The black-headed and the red-faced in Tangut indigenous texts". In Studia Orientalia 95: 275–298.
- 2003. Последние статьи и документы [Last Works and Documents]. St Petersburg: Omega Publishers. ISBN 5-7373-0259-8
- 2003. "'The General's Garden' in the Mi-nia Translation". In Последние статьи и документы [Last Works and Documents] (St Petersburg: Omega Publishers) pp. 12–23.
