= Tangut numerals =

Tangut character-based numeral system for the extinct Tangut language

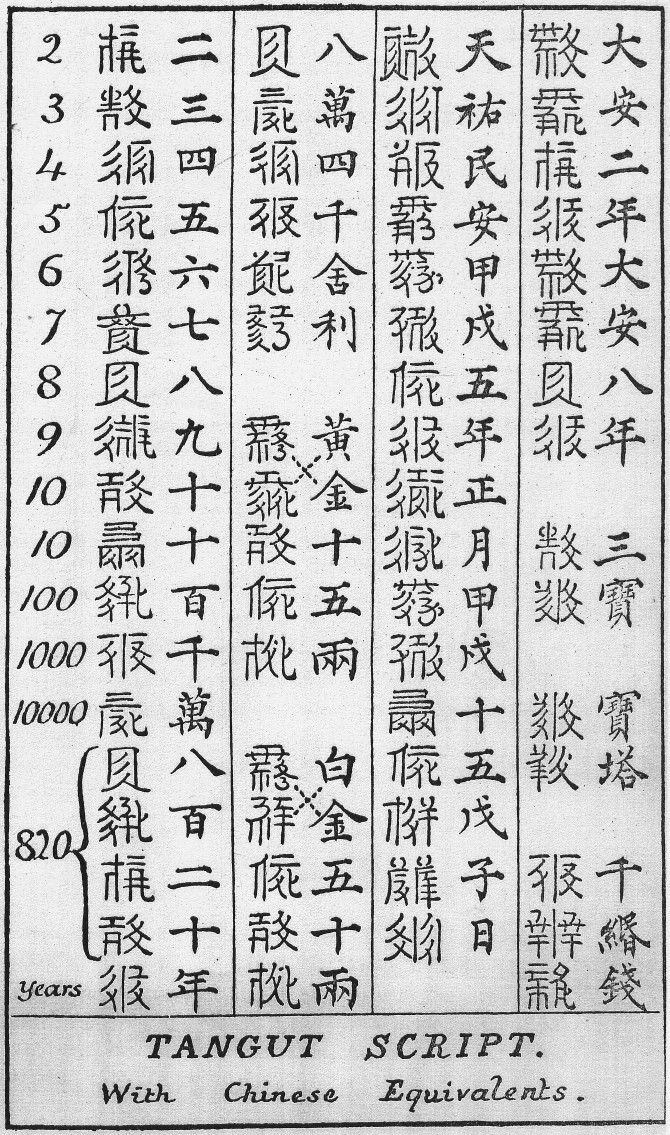
Stephen Wootton Bushell's decipherment of 37 Tangut characters, including the basic numbers (but note that his decipherment of 𗪘 ('first, former') as 'nine' is incorrect)

Tangut numerals are words and characters used to denote numbers in the Tangut language during the Western Xia regime (1038–1227) and during the subsequent Yuan dynasty (1271–1368).

Tangut numerals are written in the same format as Chinese numerals. There is an ordinary set of digits that is used for writing numbers within Tangut text (for example, chapter numbers and dates) in manuscripts and printed books, as well as for engraving on monumental inscriptions on stone. There are also two additional sets of number characters used for special purposes. Page numbers in printed books dating from the Western Xia period and the Yuan dynasty are often written using Chinese numerals.

The latest surviving example of Tangut numerals occur on the Tangut dharani pillars which were erected in Baoding on the 10th month of the 15th year of the Hongzhi era of the Ming dynasty, which corresponds to 1502.

== Cardinal numbers ==
The characters used to write ordinary cardinal numbers are listed below. There are two different words for "ten": 𗰗 *gha is the normal word, but 𗰭 *sha is sometimes used, especially for the number of days in dates, e.g. 𗰗𗼑𗰭𗾞 (gha lhi sha ny) "10th day of the 10th month".

Cardinal numbers
Number	Character	Reading
1	𘈩	*lew
2	𗍫	*ny / njɨ̱
3	𘕕	*so / sọ
4	𗥃	*lyr / ljɨr
5	𗏁	*ngwy / ŋwǝ
6	𗤁	*chhiw / tśhjiw
7	𗒹	*sha / śjạ
8	𘉋	*ar / ˑjar
9	𗢭	*gy / gjɨ
10	𗰗	*gha / ɣạ
10	𗰭	*sha
100	𘊝	*ir / ˑjir
1,000	𗡞	*tu / tụ
10,000	𗕑	*khy / khjɨ
100,000,000	𗦲	*rir / rjir

Multiple-digit numbers are constructed using a similar method to that for Chinese and Japanese numerals.

Examples of complex numbers
Number	Structure	Transliteration	Characters
14	[10] [4]	gha lyr	𗰗𗥃
60	[6] [10]	chhiw gha	𗤁𗰗
105	[1] [100] [5]	lew ir ngwy	𘈩𘊝𗏁
518	[5] [100] [10] [8]	ngwy ir gha ar	𗏁𘊝𗰗𘉋
2,362	[2] [1,000] [3] [100] [6] [10] [2]	ny tu so ir chhiw gha ny	𗍫𗡞𘕕𘊝𗤁𗰗𗍫

== Ordinal numbers ==
Ordinal numbers are formed by adding the suffix 𗡪 *tsew to the cardinal number, for example 𘕕𗡪 (so tsew) "third" and 𗍫𗰗𗡪 (ny gha tsew) "twentieth". The word 𗨁𗡪 (phu tsew) may be used for "first", although 𘈩𗡪 (lew tsew) is also found.

== Fractions ==
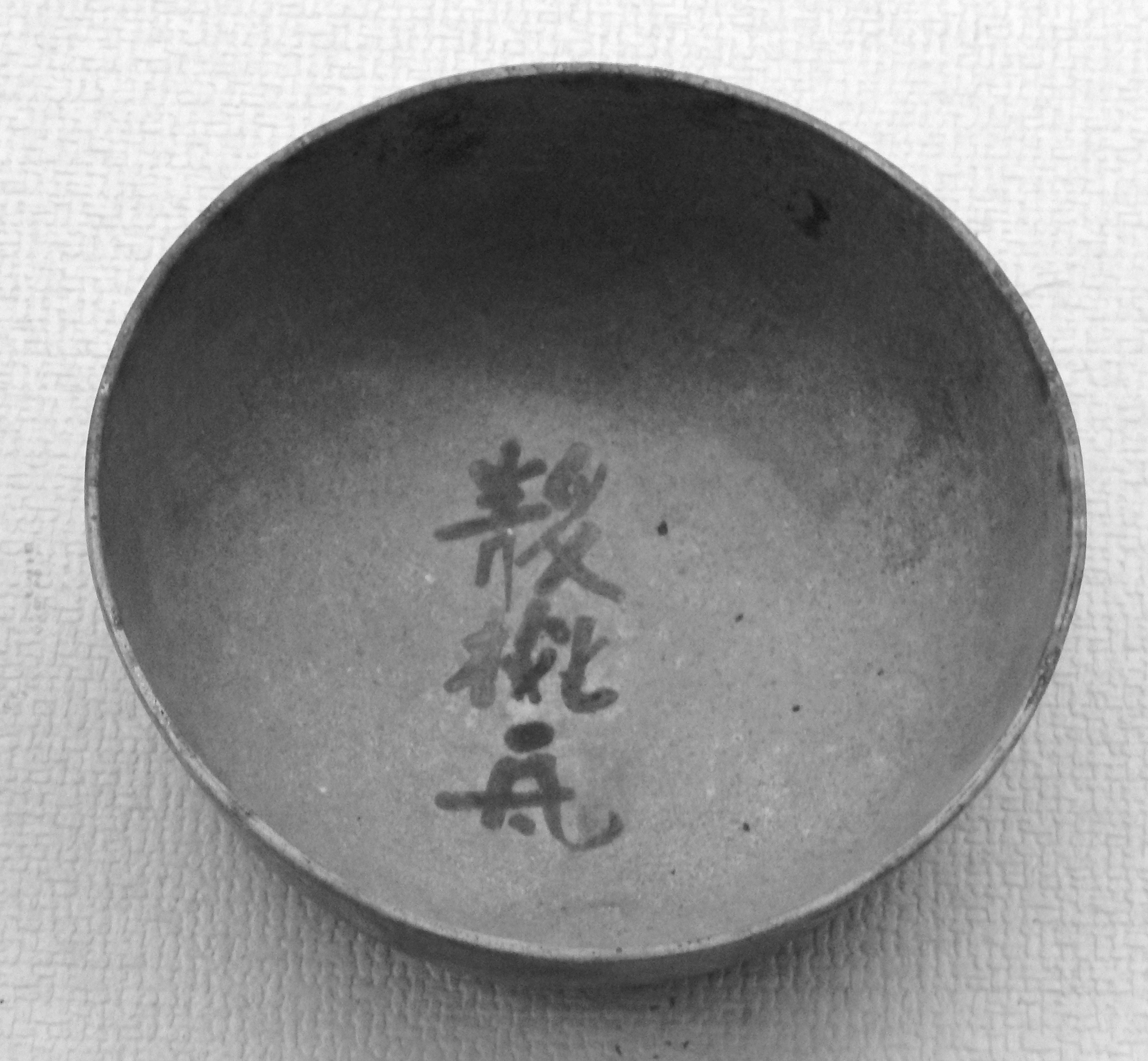
Silver bowl inscribed with "3½ taels"

The character 𗸕 *khwy is used for one half. For more complex fractions, the formula "n [parts] out of d parts" is used, where n is the numerator and d is the denominator, and the denominator is specified first. This corresponds to the structure for fractions in Chinese, for example Tangut 𘕕𘊲𘂤𘈩 (so pha kha lew) "one third" corresponds to Chinese 三分之一 (sān fēn zhī yī) "one third".

Examples of fractions
Number	Structure	Transliteration	Characters
3½ taels	[3] [tael] [½]	so lu khwy	𘕕𗍬𗸕
two-thirds	[3] [parts] [among which] [2] [parts]	so pha kha ny pha	𘕕𘊲𘂤𗍫𘊲
1/1000	[1000] [parts] [among which] [1]	tu pha kha lew	𗡞𘊲𘂤𘈩

== Special numbers ==
In addition to the normal set of cardinal numbers, there is an additional set of characters used for the numbers 2 through 7 in some circumstances. These numbers are only used in a few certain words, as well as in special month names that are used in a Tangut ode entitled Poem on Pleasure of Every Month. Ksenia Kepping considers this and other odes in the same collection (dated 1185) to be written in a special ritual language, using vocabulary which is not normally used in the common Tangut language.

There is also a special set of filiation characters for the numbers 2 through 8 which are used exclusively to indicate the relative seniority of sons, where the number is followed by the word 𗷸 *ew "son". The numbers from 2 to 7 are phonetically identical (2, 4, 6, 7) or phonetically very close (3, 5) to the corresponding ritual numbers used in the Poem on Pleasure of Every Month, but the character for 8 is phonetically identical to the normal character for 8.

Unlike the ordinary Tangut numbers, which are closely cognate to the numbers used in other Tibeto-Burman languages such as Tibetan and Nuosu, the ritual and filiation numbers do not appear to be related to numbers in any other language. Moreover, the characters for 4 and 7 are homophones in both the ritual and filiation series, which is implausible for a spoken language.

Ritual and filiation numbers
Number	Ritual character	Reading	Filiation character	Reading
2	𘂚	*lo	𘂈	*lo
3	𗛰	*rer	𗬏	*len
4	𗝝	*ngwyr	𗓟	*ngwyr
5	𗉨	*chyr	𘗤	*tsyr
6	𘍼	*vi	𘊚	*vi
7	𗘎	*ngwyr	𗸨	*ngwyr
8			𗸪	*ar

The ritual numbers are used in the following words, which are all related to Buddhism or astrology:

- 𗋾𘂚 (zhu lo) "two fish" (i.e. pisces)
- 𗛰𗔇 (rer u) "three storehouses" (i.e. the tripiṭaka)
- 𗝝𗖟 (ngwyr ka) "four stringed-instrument" (i.e. the pipa)
- 𗉨𗔕𘑗 (chyr nir ngyr) "Five Platforms Mountain" (i.e. the Western Xia equivalent of the sacred Mount Wutai, which was located in the Helan Mountains)
- 𗘎𗤪 (ngwyr ngewr) "seven sounds" (i.e. seven claps of thunder or bursts of music)

== Dates ==
Tangut numbers are used to denote the year, month and day in date expressions.

A number followed by the character 𗤒 *kew "year" indicates the year of the specified era, for example 𘀗𘑨𗰗𗤁𗤒 (tshwu wu gha chhiw kew) means the 16th year of the Qianyou era (i.e. 1185).

Lunar months are designated as a number followed by 𗼑 *lhi "moon, month", except that there are special words for the first and last month. An intercalary month is indicated by putting the character 𘒹 *lhu in front of the month name, for example 𘒹𗎊𗼑 (lhu rer lhi) "intercalary 12th month). There are also special month names used in the ritual language of the Poem on Pleasure of Every Month.

Tangut month names
Month	Common name	Reading	Ritual name	Reading	Meaning
1st	𗩭𗼑	chon lhi	𗤒𗆧𘘞𗳝	kew siw ka o	"new year month"
2nd	𗍫𗼑	ny lhi	𘙇𘂚𘘞𗳝	ryr lo ka o	"second month"
3rd	𘕕𗼑	so lhi	𗛰𘕻𘘞𗳝	rer gu ka o	"third month"
4th	𗥃𗼑	lyr lhi	𗲛𗝝𘘞𗳝	kwe ngwyr ka o	"fourth month"
5th	𗏁𗼑	ngwy lhi	𗉨𗘝𘘞𗳝	chyr lu ka o	"fifth month"
6th	𗤁𗼑	chhiw lhi	𘀐𘍼𘘞𗳝	zhiw vi ka o	"sixth month"
7th	𗒹𗼑	sha lhi	𗘎𗘋𘘞𗳝	ngwyr ka ka o	"seventh month"
8th	𘉋𗼑	ar lhi	𗍫𗥃𘘞𗳝	ny lyr ka o	"two four month"
9th	𗢭𗼑	gy lhi	𗥃𗏁𘘞𗳝	lyr ngwy ka o	"four five month"
10th	𗰗𗼑	gha lhi	𗍫𗏁𘘞𗳝	ny ngwy ka o	"two five month"
11th	𗰗𘈩𗼑	gha lew lhi	𗏁𗤁𘘞𗳝	ngwy chhiw ka o	"five six month"
12th	𗎊𗼑	rer lhi	𗌽𗎓𘘞𗳝	dy kewr ka o	"cold month"

A number followed by the character 𗾞 *ny "day" indicates the day of the month, for example 𗒹𗼑𗰭𗢭𗾞 (sha lhi sha gy ny) "19th day of the 7th month".

== See also ==
- Tangut people
- Tangut script
- Tangut language
