= Li Fanwen =

Chinese linguist (born 1932)

- Born: November 1932 (age 93); Xixiang County, Shaanxi, China
- Citizenship: China
- Known for: Dictionary of the Tangut language
- Awards: Wu Yuzhang Prize for Humanities and Social Sciences (2002)
- Scientific career
- Fields: Linguistics
- Workplaces: Chinese Academy of Social Sciences
- Academic advisors: Luo Fuyi

Li Fanwen (simplified Chinese: 李范文; traditional Chinese: 李範文; pinyin: Lǐ Fànwén) (born November 1932) is a Chinese linguist and Tangutologist.

== Biography ==
Li Fanwen was born in Xixiang County, Shaanxi in November 1932. After leaving school, he worked for several years before going to Beijing to study Tibetan at the Central College for Nationalities, from which he graduated in 1956. He stayed on at the college as a research student in the History department until he graduated in 1959. By this time, he had become fascinated with the extinct and only semi-deciphered Tangut script, and in 1960 he decided to move to Yinchuan in Ningxia, the former capital of the Tangut Empire, to devote himself to Tangut studies, but his wife was unwilling to accompany him, so they divorced.

When Li Fanwen arrived at Ningxia, he was disappointed to find that there were no opportunities to study the Tangut script and language, and instead he was assigned to Ningxia Education College to research the Hui people. Two years later, he was reassigned to the Ningxia Museum and he was finally able to dedicate himself to the study of Tangut history and language. He was sent by the museum to participate in a minor capacity in the excavations of the Western Xia tombs at the foot of the Helan Mountains, and whilst his new wife (Yang Shende 楊慎德) and children stayed behind at Yinchuan, he lived and worked at the excavations for seven years. The conditions were harsh, and the rations meagre, so that at the end of seven years, he had become emaciated and very ill, but his wife nursed him back to health.

Up to that time, Li Fanwen had been studying the Tangut script and language by himself from whatever books he could get hold of, and had no formal training in Tangut. Nevertheless, by the early 1970s he had already created more than 30,000 vocabulary cards for Tangut on his own initiative, with the intention of eventually compiling a Tangut-Chinese dictionary.

In January 1972, when Premier Zhou Enlai visited the National Museum of Chinese History and was informed that only a handful of old scholars could read the Tangut script, he instructed Wang Yeqiu (王冶秋), director of the State Bureau of Cultural Relics, to assign young scholars to study Tangut before all knowledge of Tangut died out. In response to this, Wang Yeqiu asked the Ningxia authorities to train people in the Tangut language, but there was nobody who could teach the language in Ningxia, so in May 1973, Li Fanwen was sent to Beijing to study under Luo Fuyi (羅福頤), the son of Luo Zhenyu, the founding father of Chinese Tangut studies.

This opportunity gave Li Fanwen access to much new material, and he was able to complete the first draft of his dictionary in 1976. Although the dictionary was initially accepted for publication by the Cultural Relics Publishing House, it was eventually rejected after expert review of the manuscript concluded that it was not yet mature. For the next few years, Li Fanwen made detailed studies of primary Tangut sources such as Wen Hai (文海 "Sea of Characters") and Tong Yin (同音 "Homophones") in order to fill in the missing gaps in the dictionary coverage. In April 1984, on his way to visit the renowned Japanese Tangutologist, Nishida Tatsuo, he was knocked off his bicycle in a traffic accident, and spent eighteen months in bed with a fractured thighbone. This gave him the opportunity to finish his study of the Tong Yin, which was published in 1986.

By late 1992, the new draft of Li Fanwen's Tangut-Chinese dictionary was almost complete, but he was not satisfied with the system of phonetic reconstruction that he was using, so after the Taiwan Tangutologist Gong Hwang cherng came to see him, he decided to use Professor Gong's system of phonetic reconstruction instead. The dictionary was now complete, but technical and financial issues delayed its publication until 1997. Originally, Li Fanwen had hoped to computer typeset the Tangut text, but eventually he had to abandon this plan, and the Tangut text in the 1997 edition was laboriously inserted using photocomposition. The dictionary comprised exactly 6,000 Tangut characters, and these 6,000 characters were later used as the source for the Mojikyo set of Tangut characters, which have since been widely used by Tangutologists for typesetting Tangut text. In 2002, the dictionary won the Wu Yuzhang Prize for Humanities and Social Sciences.

In 2008, a revised and expanded edition of Li Fanwen's Tangut-Chinese dictionary, with 6,074 entries, was published. The new edition was computer typeset using a Tangut font developed by Jing Yongshi (景永時).

In addition to his work on Tangut language, Li Fanwen has also published a comprehensive history of the Western Xia and a study of the Song dynasty Chinese dialect spoken in the north-west of China.

Li Fanwen currently holds professorships at Beijing University, Nanjing University, People's University, Capital Normal University, Shaanxi Normal University and Fudan University, and is the honorary head of the Ningxia Academy of Social Sciences.

In 2013 Li Fanwen won the Prix Stanislas Julien for his Tangut-Chinese dictionary.

== Works ==
- 1980. Xi Xia Yanjiu Lunji 西夏研究論集 (A Compilation of Xixia Studies). Ningxia.
- 1984. Xi Xia Lingmu Chutu Canbei Cuibian 西夏陵墓出土殘碑粹編 (A Collection of Fragments of Memorial Inscriptions from the Western Xia Tombs). Beijing.
- 1986. Tongyin Yanjiu 同音研究 (Study of the Homophones). Yinchuan.
- 1994. Songdai xibei fangyin: Fan han heshi zhang zhong zhu dui yin yanjiu 宋代西北方音——《番汉合时掌中珠》对音研究 [The Northwest Chinese Dialect at Song Times: Transliteration in Fan-Han Heshi Zhang-zhong-zhu]. Beijing.
- 1997. Xia Han Zidian 夏漢字典 (Tangut-Chinese Dictionary). Beijing.
- 2005. Xi Xia Tong Shi 西夏通史 (Comprehensive History of the Western Xia). Beijing and Yinchuan.
- 2008. Xia Han Zidian 夏漢字典 (Revised edition of Tangut-Chinese Dictionary). Beijing.
- 1982. Xixia Guanyin Huikao 西夏官印匯考 (Collected Study of Official Seals of the Western Xia). Yinchuan. [With Luo Fuyi (羅福頤)]
