= Tangut language =

Extinct Sino-Tibetan language

Tangut
- Xi-Xia
- 𗼇𗟲
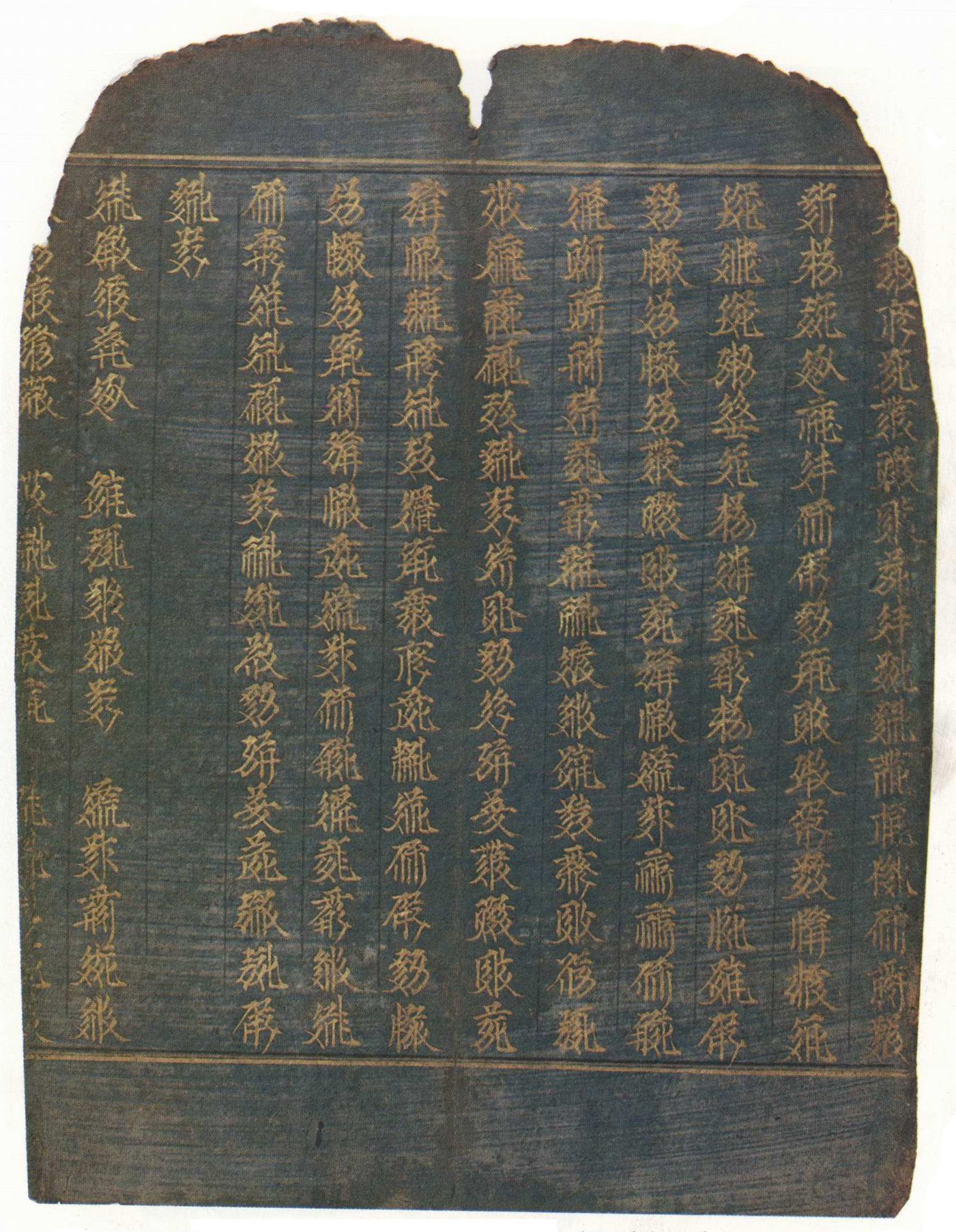
- Buddhist scripture written in Tangut
- Native to: Western Xia
- Ethnicity: Tangut people
- Era: AD 1036–1502 (attested)
- Language family: Sino-Tibetan: Tibeto-Burman; Qiangic; Gyalrongic; West Gyalrongic; Horpa; Tangut
- Writing system: Tangut script

Official status
- Official language in: Western Xia

Language codes
- ISO 639-3: txg
- Glottolog: tang1334

Tangut (Tangut: 𗼇𗟲; Transliteration: mji^{2} ŋwu̲^{1}; Chinese: 西夏語; pinyin: Xīxià yǔ; lit. 'Western Xia language') is an extinct Sino‑Tibetan language, now argued to belong within the Horpa subgroup of West Gyalrongic.

Tangut was one of the official languages of the Western Xia dynasty, founded by the Tangut people in northwestern China. The Western Xia was annexed by the Mongol Empire in 1227. The Tangut language has its own script, the Tangut script. The latest known text written in the Tangut language, the Tangut dharani pillars, dates to 1502, suggesting that the language was still in use nearly three hundred years after the collapse of the Western Xia.

== Classification ==
Since the 2010s, Tangutologists have commonly classified Tangut as a Qiangic or Gyalrongic language. On the basis of both morphological and lexical evidence, Lai et al. (2020) classify Tangut as a West Gyalrongic language. Beaudouin (2023a,b) shows that Tangut is a Horpa language, a subgroup of West Gyalrongic. He hypothesizes a position between the Northern (Stodsde) and Central (Stau, Geshiza) lects, proposing a tentative Urheimat around the place where the Erkai variety is spoken today within Ngawa, Sichuan, China.

== Rediscovery ==
Modern research into the Tangut languages began in the late 19th century and early 20th century when S. W. Bushell, Gabriel Devéria, and Georges Morisse separately published decipherments of a number of Tangut characters found on Western Xia coins, in a Chinese–Tangut bilingual inscription on a stele at Wuwei, Gansu, and in a copy of the Tangut translation of the Lotus Sutra.

The majority of extant Tangut texts were excavated at Khara-Khoto in 1909 by Pyotr Kozlov, and the script was identified as that of the Tangut state of Xixia. Such scholars as Aleksei Ivanovich Ivanov, Ishihama Juntaro (石濱純太郎), Berthold Laufer, Luo Fuchang (羅福萇), Luo Fucheng (羅福成), and Wang Jingru (王靜如) have contributed to research on the Tangut language. The most significant contribution was made by the Russian scholar Nikolai Aleksandrovich Nevsky (1892–1937), who compiled the first Tangut dictionary and reconstructed the meaning of a number of Tangut grammatical particles, thus making it possible to actually read and understand Tangut texts. His scholarly achievements were published posthumously in 1960 under the title Tangutskaya Filologiya (Tangut Philology), and the scholar was eventually (and posthumously) awarded the Soviet Lenin Prize for his work. The understanding of the Tangut language is far from perfect: although certain aspects of the morphology (Ksenia Kepping, The Morphology of the Tangut Language, Moscow: Nauka, 1985) and grammar (Tatsuo Nishida, Seika go no kenkyū, etc.) are understood, the syntactic structure of Tangut remains largely unexplored.

The Khara-Khoto documents are at present preserved in the Institute of Oriental Manuscripts of the Russian Academy of Sciences in Saint Petersburg. These survived the Siege of Leningrad, but a number of manuscripts in the possession of Nevsky at the time of his arrest by the People's Commissariat for Internal Affairs (NKVD) in 1937 went missing, and were returned, under mysterious circumstances, to the Institute of Oriental Manuscripts only in October 1991. The collections amount to about 10,000 volumes, of mostly Buddhist texts, law codes, and legal documents dating from mid-11th up to early 13th centuries. Among the Buddhist texts, a number of unique compilations, not known either in Chinese or in Tibetan versions, were recently discovered. Furthermore, the Buddhist canon, the Chinese classics, and a great number of indigenous texts written in Tangut have been preserved. These other major Tangut collections, though much smaller, belong to the British Library, the French National Library ('Bibliothèque nationale de France'), the National Library in Beijing, the Library of Beijing University, and other libraries.

== Reconstruction ==
The connection between the writing and the pronunciation of the Tangut language is even more tenuous than that between Chinese writing and the modern Chinese varieties. While in Chinese, more than 90% of the characters possess a phonetic element, this proportion is only about 10% in Tangut according to Sofronov. The reconstruction of Tangut pronunciation must resort to other sources.

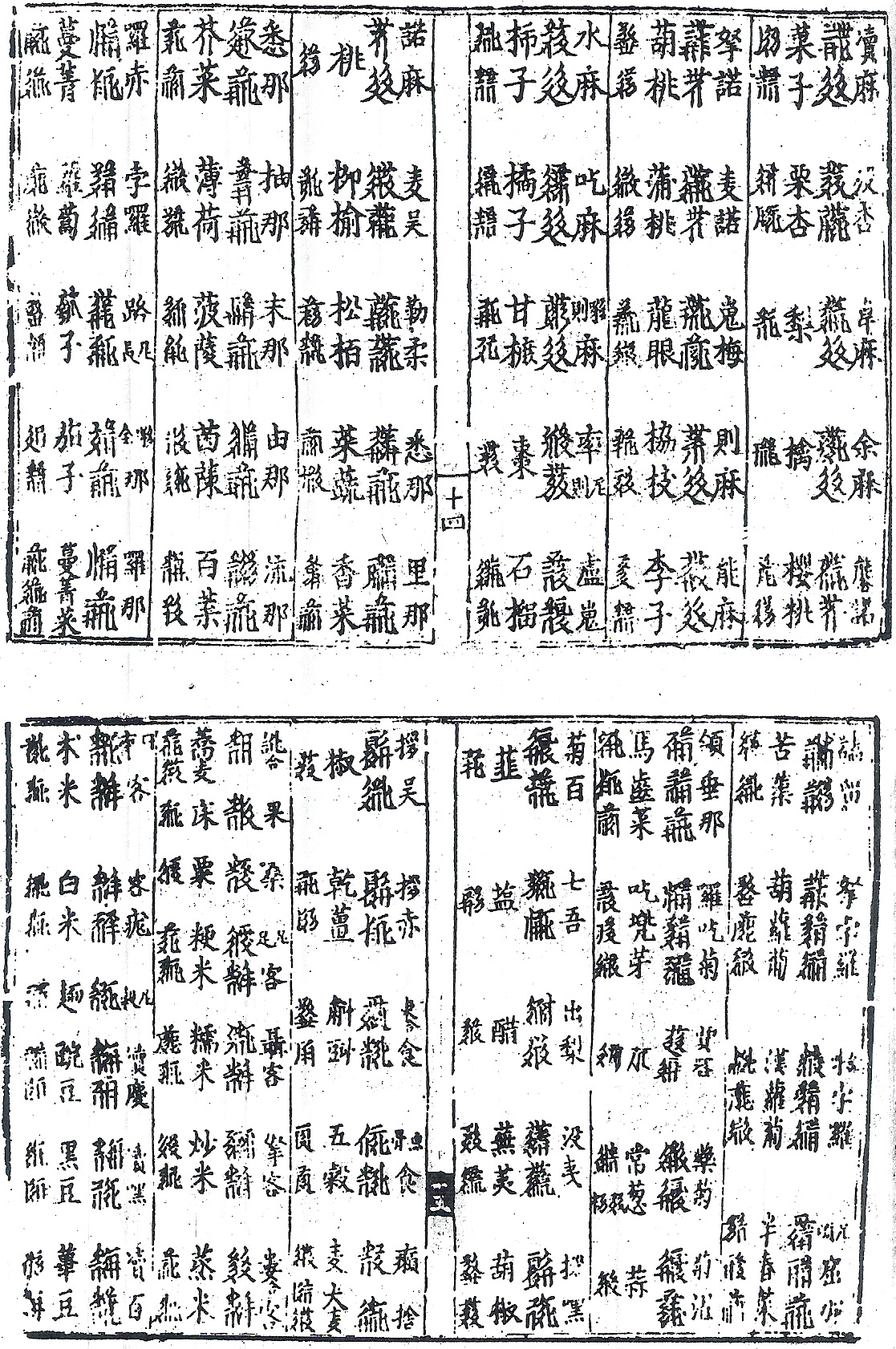
Pages from the Fanhan heshi zhangzhongzhu

The discovery of the Pearl in the Palm, a Tangut–Chinese bilingual glossary, permitted Ivanov (1909) and Laufer (1916) to propose initial reconstructions and to undertake the comparative study of Tangut. This glossary in effect indicates the pronunciation of each Tangut character with one or several Chinese characters, and inversely each Chinese character with one or more Tangut characters. The second source is the corpus of Tibetan transcriptions of Tangut. These data were studied for the first time by Nevsky (Nevskij) (1925). Though these transcriptions were not written with the intention of representing with precision the pronunciation of Tangut, but instead simply to help foreigners to pronounce and memorize the words of one language with the words of another which they could understand.

The third source, which constitutes the basis of the modern reconstructions, consists of monolingual Tangut dictionaries: the Wenhai (文海), two editions of the Tongyin (同音), the Wenhai zalei (文海雜類), and an untitled dictionary. The record of the pronunciation in these dictionaries is made using the principle of fǎnqiè, borrowed from the Chinese lexicographic tradition. Although these dictionaries may differ on small details (e.g. the Tongyin categorizes the characters according to syllable initial and rime without taking any account of tone), they all adopt the same system of 105 rimes. A certain number of rimes are in complementary distribution with respect to the place of articulation of the initials, e.g. rimes 10 and 11 or rimes 36 and 37. Fǎnqiè makes distinctions among the rhymes in a systematic and precise manner. Nonetheless, it is still necessary to compare the phonological system of the dictionaries with the other sources in order to "fill in" the categories with a phonetic value.

Nikolai Nevsky reconstructed Tangut grammar and provided the first Tangut–Chinese–English–Russian dictionary, which together with the collection of his papers was published posthumously in 1960 under the title Tangut Philology (Moscow: 1960). Later, substantial contribution to the research of Tangut language was done by Tatsuo Nishida (西田龍雄), Ksenia Kepping, Gong Hwang-cherng (龔煌城), Mikhail Viktorovich Sofronov, and Li Fanwen (李範文). Marc Miyake has published on Tangut phonology and diachronics. There are five Tangut dictionaries available: the one composed by Nevsky, one composed by Nishida (1966), one composed by Li (1997, revised edition 2008), one composed by Yevgeny Kychanov (2006), and one composed by Han Xiaomang (韓小忙) (2021).

Modern refinements to Tangut reconstruction leverage a new type of data that was unavailable to previous scholars: the phonology of modern Gyalrongic languages.

== Phonology ==
The Tangut syllable has a CV structure and carries one of two distinctive tones, flat (平聲) or rising (上聲). Following the tradition of Chinese phonological analysis the Tangut syllable is divided into initial (聲母) and rhyme (韻母) (i.e. the remaining syllable minus the initial).

=== Initials ===
The initials are divided into the following categories:

Tangut term	Chinese term	Modern equivalent	Arakawa	Gong HC	Miyake	Gong X	Beaudouin
𗠉𗙏𗊢	重唇音類	bilabials	p, ph, b, m	p, ph, b, m	p, ph, b, m	p, ph, b, m	p, pʰ, b, m
𗠉𗙏𗣫	輕唇音類	labio-dentals	f, v, w	w	v	f, v/vw	v/ʋ
𗢯𘁙𗙏	舌頭音類	apicals (dentals)	t, th, d, n	t, th, d, n	t, th, d, n	t, th, d, n	t, tʰ, nd, n/ɲ
𗢯𗀔𗙏	舌上音類	laminals (alveolars)	ty', thy', dy', ny'		tʂ, tʂh, dʐ, ɳ	ṇ	
𘟗𗙏	牙音類	velars	k, kh, g, ng	k, kh, g, ŋ	k, kh, g, ŋ	k/q, kh/qh, g/ġ, ŋ	k/q, kʰ/qʰ, g, ŋ
𘘄𘁙𗙏	齒頭音類	dental affricates and fricatives	ts, tsh, dz, s	ts, tsh, dz, s	ts, tsh, dz, s	ts, tsh, dz, s	ts/tɕ, tsʰ/tɕʰ, dz/dʑ, s/ɕ
𘘄𗒘𗙏	正齒音類	palatal affricates and fricatives	c, ch, j, sh	tś, tśh, dź, ś	ch, chh, j, sh	tś/tṣ, tśh/tṣh, dź/dẓ, ś/ṣ	tʃ, tʃʰ, dʒ, ʃ (tʂ, tʂʰ, dʐ, ʂ)
𗍂𗙏	喉音類	laryngeals	', h	., x, ɣ, j	ʔ, h, gh	∅, h, gh/ġh, y	x/χ, ɣ/ʁ, j
𘚶𘞨𗙏	流風音類	resonants	l, lh, ld, z, zz, r	l, lh, z, ź, r	l, lh, z, zh, r	l, lh, ll, z, ź/ẓ, r	l/ʎ, ɬ, ld, z/ʑ, ʒ (ʐ), ɽ

=== Rhymes ===
The rhyme books distinguish 105 rhymes, which are, in turn, classified in several ways: division/grade (等), type (環), and class (攝).

Tangut rhymes occur in three types (環). They are seen in the tradition of Nishida, followed by both Arakawa and Gong HC as 'normal' (普通母音), 'tense' (緊喉母音), and 'retroflex' (捲舌母音). Gong HC leaves normal vowels unmarked and places a dot under tense vowels and an -r after retroflex vowels. Arakawa differs only by indicating tense vowels with a final -q.

The rhyme books distinguish four vowel grades (等). In early phonetic reconstructions, all four were separately accounted for, but it has since been realized that grades three and four are in complementary distribution, depending on the initial. Consequently, the reconstructions of Arakawa and Gong HC do not account for this distinction. Gong HC represents these three grades as V, iV, and jV. Arakawa accounts for them as V, iV, and V.

In general, rhyme class (攝) corresponds to the set of all rhymes under the same rhyme type which have the same main vowel.

Some rhymes appear twice within the same class in the rhyme books which have otherwise indistinguishable values in the transcriptions. Gong HC labels these rhymes as series 1 and 2, and posits this distinction as phonemic vowel length, pointing to evidence that indicates that Tangut had a distinction that Chinese lacked. Examining Sino-Tangut pronunciations and Sanskrit transcriptions, Gong X instead proposed that the distinction instead comes from presence or absence of a nasal preinitial.

Below is a list of the 105 rhymes along with their classifications:

List of 105 rhymes in Tangut
Rhyme	Level	Rising	Type	Class	Series	Grade	Value (Gong HC)	Notes
R.1	1.01 𘁨	2.01 𗾴	normal	1	1	1	-u	
R.2	1.02 𘜲	2.02 𗲺	normal	1	1	3(3)	-ju	Arakawa: Grade 2
R.3	1.03 𗔠	2.03 𘆶	normal	1	1	3(4)	-ju	Arakawa: Grade 2
R.4	1.04 𘙼	2.04 𘓩	normal	1	1	1	-u	Arakawa: Grade 3; Miyake: Grade 2
R.5	1.05 𘃠	2.05 𗷪	normal	1	2	1	-u̱	
R.6	1.06 𗃴		normal	1	2	3	-ju̱	Arakawa, Gong X: Grade 2
R.7	1.07 𗴢	2.06 𗩈	normal	1	2	3	-ju̱	
R.8	1.08 𗬃	2.07 𗙐	normal	2	1	1	-e	
R.9	1.09 𗠭	2.08 𗎃	normal	2	1	2	-ie	
R.10	1.10 𗚋	2.09 𗄐	normal	2	1	3(3)	-ji	
R.11	1.11 𗣣	2.10 𘒇	normal	2	1	3(4)	-ji	
R.12	1.12 𗛁	2.11 𗵿	normal	2	2	1	-e̱	
R.13	1.13 𘎛		normal	2	2	2	-ie̱	
R.14	1.14 𗮦	2.12 𘏗	normal	2	2	3	-ji̱	
R.15	1.15 𗗆	2.13 𗖗	normal	2	nasal	1	-ẽ	
R.16	1.16 𗑃		normal	2	nasal	3	-jĩ	Arakawa: Grade 2
R.17	1.17 𗊡	2.14 𗊺	normal	3	1	1	-a	
R.18	1.18 𗉺	2.15 𗺩	normal	3	1	2	-ia	
R.19	1.19 𗰭	2.16 𗜓	normal	3	1	3(3)	-ja	
R.20	1.20 𘅄	2.17 𗾥	normal	3	1	3(4)	-ja	
R.21	1.21 𘄢	2.18 𘏧	normal	3	2	3	-ja̱	Arakawa: Grade 4; Arakawa, Gong X: Series 1
R.22	1.22 𗴡	2.19 𘆕	normal	3	2	1	-a̱	
R.23		2.20 𗫬	normal	3	2	2	-ia̱	
R.24	1.23 𗫴	2.21 𘜴	normal	3	2	3	-ja̱	
R.25	1.24 𘂦	2.22 𘟑	normal	3	nasal	1	-ã	
R.26	1.25 𘅻	2.23 𗹺	normal	3	nasal	2	-iã	
R.27	1.26 𘓾	2.24 𗶕	normal	3	nasal	3	-jã	
R.28	1.27 𗢁	2.25 𗍉	normal	4	1	1	-ə	
R.29	1.28 𗙌	2.26 𗞨	normal	4	1	2	-iə	
R.30	1.29 𘎻	2.27 𗶽	normal	4	1	3	-jɨ	
R.31	1.30 𗝚	2.28 𗸹	normal	4	1	3(4)	-jɨ	
R.32	1.31 𘚾		normal	4	2	1	-ə̱	
R.33	1.32 𘃔	2.29 𗠸	normal	4	2	3	-jɨ̱	Arakawa: Grade 2
R.34	1.33 𗃰	2.30 𗨾	normal	5	1	1	-ej	
R.35	1.34 𗷘	2.31 𗷛	normal	5	1	2	-iej	
R.36	1.35 𘟅	2.32 𗜙	normal	5	1	3(3)	-jij	
R.37	1.36 𘒋	2.33 𗆎	normal	5	1	3(4)	-jij	
R.38	1.37 𘈧	2.34 𗥉	normal	5	2	1	-e̱j	
R.39	1.38 𘘅		normal	5	2	2	-ie̱j	
R.40	1.39 𘅡	2.35 𗾫	normal	5	2	3	-ji̱j	
R.41	1.40 𗣫		normal	6	1	1	-əj	Arakawa: Grade 3, same value as R.40; Miyake, Gong X: Nasal rhyme in class 5
R.42	1.41 𘐝	2.36 𗨆	normal	6	1	2	-iəj	Arakawa: Grade 1; Arakawa, Miyake, Gong X: Nasal rhyme
R.43	1.42 𗵆	2.37 𗼃	normal	6	1	3	-jɨj	Arakawa: Grade 2; Arakawa, Miyake, Gong X: Nasal rhyme
R.44	1.43 𗺹	2.38 𗬦	normal	7	1	1	-ew	
R.45	1.44 𗶥	2.39 𗉡	normal	7	1	2	-iew	
R.46	1.45 𘝖	2.40 𗺶	normal	7	1	3	-jiw	
R.47	1.46 𗪲		normal	7	1	3	-jiw	
R.48		2.41 𗅢	normal	7	2	1	-e̱w	
R.49	1.47 𘞘		normal	7	2	3	-ji̱w	Arakawa: Grade 2
R.50	1.48 𗄈		normal	8a	1	3	-jwo	Closed rhyme
R.51	1.49 𘀁	2.42 𗟁	normal	8a	1	1	-o	
R.52	1.50 𗆉	2.43 𘋘	normal	8a	1	2	-io	
R.53	1.51 𗔆	2.44 𗚂	normal	8a	1	3	-jo	
R.54	1.52 𗫕	2.45 𘉼	normal	8a	2	1	-o̱	
R.55	1.53 𗠟	2.46 𘘁	normal	8a	2	2/3	-io̱/-jo̱	Grade 2/3 mixed rhyme
R.56	1.54 𘙾	2.47 𗫫	normal	8b	1	1	-ow	Arakawa, Miyake, Gong X: Nasal rhyme
R.57	1.55 𘙠	2.48 𗽕	normal	8b	1	2	-iow	Arakawa, Miyake, Gong X: Nasal rhyme
R.58	1.56 𗭴	2.49 𗭃	normal	8b	1	3	-jow	Arakawa, Miyake, Gong X: Nasal rhyme
R.59	1.57 𘉐		normal	8b	2	2	-io̱w	Arakawa: Grade 1, Series 3; Miyake: Series 2 nasal rhyme; Gong X: Series 1
R.60		2.50 𗷢	normal	8b	2	3	-jo̱w	Arakawa: Grade 2, Series 3; Miyake: Series 2 nasal rhyme; Gong X: Series 1
R.61	1.58 𗚽	2.51 𗏒	tense	1	1	1	-ụ	
R.62	1.59 𗤧	2.52 𘝍	tense	1	1	3	-jụ	Arakawa: Grade 2; Gong X: Grade 2/3 mixed rhyme
R.63	1.60 𗧎	2.53 𗐯	tense	5	1	2	-iẹj	Gong X: Grade 2/3 mixed rhyme
R.64	1.61 𗖞	2.54 𗿩	tense	5	1	3	-jịj	Arakawa: Grade 1 nasal rhyme
R.65	1.62 𗝾	2.55 𗅲	tense	6	1	3	-jɨ̣j	Arakawa: Grade 2; Arakawa, Miyake, Gong X: Nasal rhyme
R.66	1.63 𘟫	2.56 𗰗	tense	3	1	1	-ạ	
R.67	1.64 𗕹	2.57 𘐓	tense	3	1	3	-jạ	Gong X: Grade 2/3 mixed rhyme
R.68	1.65 𗄩	2.58 𗇠	tense	2	1	1	-ẹ	
R.69	1.66 𗉁	2.59 𗙑	tense	2	1	2	-iẹ	
R.70	1.67 𗳃		tense	2	1	3	-jị	
R.71	1.68 𗨹	2.60 𗒣	tense	4	1	1	-ə̣	Arakawa: Class 2, Series 2
R.72	1.69 𗥇	2.61 𗲸	tense	4	1	3	-jɨ̣	Arakawa: Class 2, Series 2 Gong X: Grade 2/3 mixed rhyme
R.73	1.70 𘔸	2.62 𗥏	tense	8a	1	1	-ọ	Gong X: Nasal rhyme
R.74	1.71 𗶪	2.63 𘒵	tense	8a	1	2	-iọ	Arakawa, Gong X: Grade 1
R.75	1.72 𗅼	2.64 𘈎	tense	8a	1	3	-jọ	Arakawa: Grade 2
R.76		2.65 𗽌	tense	6	1	2	-iə̣j	Arakawa: Class 5, Grade 2, Series 1; Miyake: Nasal rhyme
R.77	1.73 𗯿	2.66 𗯬	retroflex	5	1	1	-ejr	Arakawa: Grade 2, Series 1
R.78		2.67 𘌀	retroflex	5	1	2	-iejr	Arakawa: Grade 1, Series 2 tense rhyme
R.79	1.74 𗙨	2.68 𗳭	retroflex	5	1	3	-jijr	Arakawa: Grade 2, Series 2 tense rhyme
R.80	1.75 𗌈	2.69 𗎑	retroflex	1	1	1	-ur	
R.81	1.76 𗋿	2.70 𗌏	retroflex	1	1	3(4)	-jur	
R.82	1.77 𗨈	2.71 𗄛	retroflex	2	1	1	-er	
R.83	1.78 𗈮		retroflex	2	1	2	-ier	
R.84	1.79 𗟶	2.72 𘊝	retroflex	2	1	3	-jir	
R.85	1.80 𗴐	2.73 𗐔	retroflex	3	1	1	-ar	
R.86	1.81 𗉾		retroflex	3	1	2	-iar	
R.87	1.82 𗸪	2.74 𗔻	retroflex	3	1	3	-jwar	Gong HC: Closed rhyme
R.88	1.83 𗧵		retroflex	3	2	1	-a̱r	
R.89		2.75 𗡗	retroflex	3	2	3	-ja̱r	Arakawa: Grade 2
R.90	1.84 𗙅	2.76 𘟐	retroflex	4	1	1	-ər	
R.91	1.85 𗱘		retroflex	4	1	2	-iər	
R.92	1.86 𗲆	2.77 𗬼	retroflex	4	1	3	-jɨr	
R.93	1.87 𗨎	2.78 𘜔	retroflex	7	1	1	-ewr	
R.94	1.88 𗖬	2.79 𘞫	retroflex	7	1	3(4)	-jiwr	Arakawa: Grade 2
R.95	1.89 𘈆	2.80 𘏴	retroflex	8a	1	1	-or	
R.96	1.90 𗑑	2.81 𗟽	retroflex	8a	1	2/3	-ior/-jor	Grade 2/3 mixed rhyme; Arakawa: Grade 2
R.97	1.91 𗔶	2.82 𗡹	retroflex	8b	1	1	-owr	Arakawa: Grade 3
R.98		2.83 𘊈	retroflex	8b	1	3(4)	-jowr	Arakawa: Grade 1
R.99		2.84 𗁌	others	2	2	1	-e̱r	Arakawa: Grade 1, Series 1 retroflex rhyme
R.100	1.92 𗂴	2.85 𗉕	others	4	2	3	-jɨ̱r	Arakawa: Grade 2, Series 1; Miyake: Grade 1/3/4 mixed rhyme
R.101	1.93 𗹙	2.86 𗎫	others	2	2	3	-ji̱r	Arakawa: Class 5, Grade 2, Series 1
R.102	1.94 𗂌		others	8a	2	1	-o̱r	Arakawa: Series 1
R.103	1.95 𗌜		others	8a	2	3(4)	-jo̱r	Arakawa: Class 3, Grade 4, Series 1
R.104	1.96 𗜰		others	1	nasal	1	-ũ	
R.105	1.97 𗇜		others	3	1	3	-jwar	Closed rhyme; Arakawa: Grade 1

In Miyake's reconstruction, the 95 vowels of Tangut formed from a six-vowel system in Pre-Tangut because of preinitial loss. (The two vowels in parentheses appeared only in loanwords from Chinese, and many of the vowels in class III were in complementary distribution with their equivalents in class IV.)

Pre-Tangut vowel	Class 1	Class 2	Class 3	Class 4
*u	əu	o	ɨu	iu
*u	əəu	oo	ɨuu	iuu
*u	(əũ)			
*u	əụ		ɨụ	iụ
*u	əuʳ			iuʳ
*i	əi	ɪ	ɨi	i
*i	əəi	ɪɪ	ɨii	ii
*i	əĩ		ɨĩ	ĩ
*i	əị		ɨị	ị
*i	əiʳ	ɪʳ	ɨiʳ	iʳ
*i	əəiʳ	ɪɪʳ	ɨiiʳ	iiʳ
*a	a	æ	ɨa	ia
*a	aa	ææ	ɨaa	iaa
*a	ã	æ̃	ɨã	iã
*a	ạ		ɨạ	iạ
*a	aʳ	æʳ	ɨaʳ	iaʳ
*a	aaʳ		ɨaaʳ	iaaʳ
*a				(ya)
*ə	ə	ʌ	ɨə	iə
*ə	əə		ɨəə	iəə
*ə	ə̣		ɨə̣	iə̣
*ə	əʳ	ʌʳ	ɨəʳ	iəʳ
*ə			ɨəəʳ	iəəʳ
*e	e	ɛ	ɨe	i.e.
*e	ee	ɛ	ɨee	iee
*e	ẽ	ɛ̃	ɨẽ	iẽ
*e		ɛ̣̃	ɨẹ̃	iẹ̃
*e		ɛ̣	ɨẹ	iẹ
*e	eʳ	ɛʳ	ɨeʳ	ieʳ
*ik *ek *uk	ew	ɛw	ɨew	iew
*ik *ek *uk			ɨiw	iw
*ik *ek *uk	eʳw			i(e)ʳw
*o	o	ɔ	ɨo	io
*o			wɨo	
*o	oo	ɔɔ	ɨoo	ioo
*o	õ	ɔ̃	ɨõ	iõ
*o		ɔ̃ɔ̃	ɨõõ	iõõ
*o	ọ	ɔ̣	ɨọ	iọ
*o	oʳ	ɔʳ	ɨoʳ	ioʳ
*o	ooʳ			iooʳ
*o	õʳ			iõʳ

The classes here are related to those of Chinese rime tables.

=== Tones ===
Gong Xun (2025) reconstructed the flat tone as a high-falling tone /HL/ and the rising tone as a mid-level tone /M/. The paradoxical tone names and their respective contour are thought to have been the result of a tonal reversal process, and cognates between Tangut and other Qiangic languages are observed to correspond quite symmetrically, with the Tangut syllables usually in the opposite pitch of those in the Qiangic languages.

== Morphosyntax ==
Tangut clause syntax prefers the subject–object–verb order. Like Chinese, the Tangut NP places numeral and classifier before the noun.

The Tangut parts of speech consists of three categories: nominals, verbs, and expressives. Adjectives do not exist as an independent lexical category in Tangut. Property-attributing words take verbal inflections in predicational sentences or are juxtaposed before the heads that they modify in attributive and referential uses.

=== Nominals ===
==== Pronouns ====
		Singular	Dual	Plural
1st person	Unmarked	ŋa¹	ŋa¹ mji²	ŋa¹ njɨ²
1st person	Honorific	mjo¹	mjo¹ mji²	mjo¹ njɨ²
2nd person	Unmarked	nja²	ŋa¹ mji²	nja² njɨ²
2nd person	Honorific	nji¹	nji¹ mji²	nji¹ njɨ²
3rd person	Proximal	thjɨ²/thju²	–	–
3rd person	Distal	thja¹	–	thja² (nji²)

==== Numerals ====
Apart from the native decimal counting system, Tangut literature also used a Buddhist counting system and additional lexemes for 2 through 8 specifically used to refer the relative seniority of sons in a family.

Native Tangut numerals
	Tangut	Tibetan	Japhug
1	lew¹	gtɕig	ci/tɤɣ
2	njɨ¹	gɲis	ʁnɯz
3	sọ¹	gsum	χsɯm
4	ljɨ̱r¹	bʑi	kɯβde
5	ŋwə¹	lŋa	kɯmŋu
6	tʃhjiw¹	drug	kɯtʂɤɣ
7	ʃjạ¹	bdun	kɯɕnɯz
8	jar¹	brgjad	kɯrcat
9	gjɨ̱¹	dgu	kɯngɯt
10	ɣạ²	btɕu	sqi
100	jir²	gja	ɣurʑa/-ri
1000	tụ¹	stoŋ tsho	stoŋtsu
10000	khjɨ²	khri tsho	khrɯtsu (sqi)

=== Verbs ===
Like other Gyalrongic languages, Tangut verbs are highly synthetic with many different morphological slots. The general verb template is shown in the table below:

Tangut verb template
+6	+5	+4	+3	+2	+1	core		-1	-2	-3	-4
ja-	TAM/ORIENT	mood	NEG	modal	valency	Incorporated noun	verb stem	person	-jij¹ (other suffixes)	-sji²	-djij²

𗥑𗭴 𗤄𘒣 𗍳 𘊐𗉘𘈞𘉞 𘘣
xu1·jow1 ·jɨr1dạ2 nji2 kjij1-tśhjɨ1-mjịj1-nja2 ·jɨ2
Fu.Rong ask 2.HON Q.PFV:IN-EXP-dream-2SG QUOT
Fu Rong asked, "did you dream?" (Leilin, 06.16B.4)

In Tangut texts, only few instances of syntactic noun incorporation are attested: the head is final, since it doesn’t move, the directional marker serves as adverb; transitive verbs can absorb the object, but not the subject. In other Qiangic languages that possess high levels of pronominalization such as Japhug and Khroskyabs, NI is still a more syntactically productive process with widespread uses.

𘈷𗗙 𘙌𗦳𗠔𘉞
gji2=jij1 kjɨ1-dzju2-phjo2-nja2
son=ANTIERG PFV.IN-lord-cause-2SG.P
You made your son lord (of Zhongshan). (Leilin, 03.10.B.4)

𗒯 𘄽𘄽 𗞞𗤶𘅎
khji1 ŋạ2.ŋạ2 dja2-njɨ̣j1-ljɨ̣j2
Ji very PFV-heart-be.happy
Ji rejoiced with all his heart. (Leilin, 07.12.B.4)

==== Agreement ====
Like other Gyalrongic languages, agreement in Tangut is sensitive to both the subject and object.

In Tangut, two parts of the verb are sensitive to agreement, the person suffix (slot -1) and the verb stem itself (verbal core). For intransitive verbs, only the person suffix is relevant where it agrees with the subject of the verb. As for transitive verbs, verbs generally agree with the absolutive argument except if the absolutive argument is third-person and the ergative is 1st or 2nd person. In these situations, the suffix instead agrees with the ergative argument.

Subject or agent	Patient							Intransitive
Subject or agent	1sg	1du	1pl	2sg	2du	2pl	3	Intransitive
1sg				Σ-𘉞 Σ-nja^{2}	Σ-𘂆 Σ-tsjɨ^{1}	Σ-𗐱 Σ-nji^{2}	Σ-𗧓 Σ-ŋa^{2}	Σ-𗧓 Σ-ŋa^{2}
1du				Σ-𘉞 Σ-nja^{2}	Σ-𘂆 Σ-tsjɨ^{1}	Σ-𗐱 Σ-nji^{2}	Σ-𘙌 Σ-kjɨ^{1}	Σ-𘙌 Σ-kjɨ^{1}
1pl				Σ-𘉞 Σ-nja^{2}	Σ-𘂆 Σ-tsjɨ^{1}	Σ-𗐱 Σ-nji^{2}	Σ-𗐱 Σ-nji^{2}	Σ-𗐱 Σ-nji^{2}
2sg	Σ-𗧓 Σ-ŋa^{2}	Σ-𘙌 Σ-kjɨ^{1}	Σ-𗐱 Σ-nji^{2}				Σ-𘉞 Σ-nja^{2}	Σ-𘉞 Σ-nja^{2}
2du	Σ-𗧓 Σ-ŋa^{2}	Σ-𘙌 Σ-kjɨ^{1}	Σ-𗐱 Σ-nji^{2}				Σ-𘂆 Σ-tsjɨ^{1}	Σ-𘂆 Σ-tsjɨ^{1}
2pl	Σ-𗧓 Σ-ŋa^{2}	Σ-𘙌 Σ-kjɨ^{1}	Σ-𗐱 Σ-nji^{2}				Σ-𗐱 Σ-nji^{2}	Σ-𗐱 Σ-nji^{2}
3	Σ-𗧓 Σ-ŋa^{2}	Σ-𘙌 Σ-kjɨ^{1}	Σ-𗐱 Σ-nji^{2}	Σ-𘉞 Σ-nja^{2}	Σ-𘂆 Σ-tsjɨ^{1}	Σ-𗐱 Σ-nji^{2}	Σ	Σ

Cells coloured in green not only involve the person suffix but also involve alternations of the stems from the basic stem A to stem B. This stem alternation pattern originates from a third-person object suffix of the form *-w as is also found in other Sino-Tibetan languages. In general, stem alternation involves changing the vowel of the stem in a pattern shown as below.

Stem A	Stem B	Example
-i/e	-o	𗡅 dzji^{1} → 𗠈 dzjo^{1} "eat"
-u	-o	𗕼 lju^{2} → 𗬘 ljo^{2} "to throw"
-ej/ij	-o	𗿷 dźjij^{2} → 𗲉 dźjo^{2} "to possess"
-ej/ij	-i/e	𘟀 ljij^{2} → 𗐵 lji^{2} "to see"
-a	-ɨ/ə	𗴒 kjạ^{1} → 𗕐 kjɨ̣^{1} "to fear"

==== Tense ====
Some verbs display an alternation unrelated to person, encoding a non-past/past distinction. The non-past stems can be used in non-finite contexts as action nominals, functional infinitives, or in clause chaining. The past stem is always prefixed by a perfective preverb, except for "to come", and post-verbal occurrences of "to go", which may indicate a different part of speech.

Stem 1 (non-past)	Stem 2 (past)	Meaning
𗶷 śjɨ^{1}	𗶹 śji^{2}	"to ɡo"
𗄼 lja^{1}	𗆐 ljịj^{2}	"to come"
𗈶 sjɨ^{1}	𗢏/𗏋 sji^{2}	"to die"
𘐩 phjɨ^{1}	𘜉 phji^{2}	"to abandon, to lose"

== See also ==
- Gyalrongic languages
- Tangutology
- List of Tangutologists
- Jurchen language
