= Aleksei Ivanovich Ivanov =

Russian linguist

- Born: 1878
- Died: 1937 (aged 58–59)
- Cause of death: Execution following arrest by the NKVD

Academic background
- Education: Saint Petersburg University

Academic work
- Discipline: Linguist
- Main interests: Chinese, Manchu, Tangut

Aleksei Ivanovich Ivanov (Russian: Алексе́й Ива́нович Ивано́в; Chinese: 伊鳳閣; pinyin: Yī Fènggé; 1878–1937) was a Russian Sinologist and Tangutologist.

== Biography ==
Ivanov entered Saint Petersburg University in 1897, where he studied Chinese and Manchu. After graduating in 1902 he went to China for further study for two years, and on his return in 1904 he went on a study tour of England, France and Germany for a year. He was appointed a lecturer in Chinese at Saint Petersburg University in 1904, and he was made a professor Chinese and Manchu in 1915. In 1922 Ivanov was appointed as a senior dragoman (interpreter) at the Soviet embassy in Beijing. In the summer of 1937, during the Great Purge, Ivanov was arrested and executed.

== Scholarship ==
Ivanov was the first scholar to study the printed books and manuscripts written in the as yet undeciphered Tangut script that had been found in the abandoned city of Khara-Khoto in Inner Mongolia by Pyotr Kozlov in 1908–1909. In autumn 1909 as many as 24,000 volumes of books and manuscripts in Chinese, Tangut and other languages, together with numerous archaeological artefacts, had been sent to the Russian Geographical Society in Saint Petersburg by Kozlov. The books and manuscripts were subsequently moved to the Asiatic Museum of the Academy of Sciences (now the Institute of Oriental Manuscripts of the Russian Academy of Sciences). Together with V. L. Kotvich (Władysław Kotwicz), a Polish scholar of Mongolian and Manchu, Ivanov worked on the identification and preservation of the books and manuscripts from Khara-Khoto. Among these books Ivanov discovered a bilingual Chinese-Tangut glossary called the Pearl in the Palm (Chinese: 番漢合時掌中珠; pinyin: Fān-Hàn Héshí Zhǎngzhōngzhū) which he realised was the key to deciphering the Tangut language. He later discovered three monolingual Tangut dictionaries and glossaries: Homophones (Chinese: 音同; pinyin: Yīntóng); Sea of Characters (Chinese: 文海; pinyin: Wénhǎi); and Mixed Characters (Chinese: 雜字; pinyin: Zázì). Based on the Pearl in the Palm and the other dictionaries, Ivanov was able to compile a dictionary of about 3,000 Tangut characters. The dictionary was completed in 1918, and deposited at the Asiatic Museum, where it remained until 1922, when Ivanov took it back. Due to the unstable political situation at the time, the dictionary was never published, and was not even known to Ivanov's most famous student, Nikolai Aleksandrovich Nevsky, whose posthumous work, Tangut Philology (1960), laid the bedrock for modern Tangut scholarship. Ivanov's dictionary, which was at his home at the time of his arrest and execution in 1937, has never been seen since.

== Works ==
- 1909. "Из находок П. К. Козлова в г. Хара-хото" [From the finds of P. K. Kozlov at Kharakhoto]; in Izvestiia Imperatorskogo Geograficheskogo obshchestva [Bulletin of the Imperial Geographical Society], vol. XLV pp. * 1911. "Страница из истории Си-ся" [A chapter in the history of Xixia]; in Izvestiia Imperatorskoi Akademii Nauk [Bulletin of the Imperial Academy of Sciences] pp. 831–836.
- 1909. "Zur Kenntniss der Hsi-hsia-Sprache"; in Izvestiia Imperatorskoi Akademii Nauk [Bulletin of the Imperial Academy of Sciences], series VI pp. 1221–1233.
- 1913. "Документы из города Хара-хото" [Documents from Khara-khoto]; in Izvestiia Imperatorskoi Akademii Nauk [Bulletin of the Imperial Academy of Sciences] 463–477.
- 1918. "Памятники тангутского письма" [Tangut manuscripts]; in Izvestiia Rossiiskoi Akademii Nauk [Bulletin of the Russian Academy of Sciences], series VI pp. 1221–1233.
- 1920. "Monuments de l'écriture tangout"; in Journal Asiatique, series XI pp. 107–109.
