= Gong Hwang-cherng =

Taiwanese linguist and tangutologist

Gong Hwang-cherng (traditional Chinese: 龔煌城; simplified Chinese: 龚煌城; pinyin: Gōng Huángchéng) (1934–2010) was a Taiwanese linguist who specialized in Sino-Tibetan comparative linguistics and the phonetic reconstruction of Tangut and Old Chinese.

He was born on 10 December 1934 at Yunlin County in Taiwan, and graduated from National Taiwan Normal University in 1958 with a degree in English. He earned his PhD in 1975 from LMU Munich in Germany, and was a research fellow and later professor at Academia Sinica in Taiwan. He was elected an honorary member of the Linguistic Society of America in 2001, and an academician of Academia Sinica in 2002. In 2006, he received a life achievement award from the Linguistic Society of Taiwan.

== Works ==
- Gong Huang-cherng 龔煌城 (1977). "古藏文的y 及其相關問題 guzangwen de y ji qixiangguan wenti [Ancient Tibetan y and related questions]." Bulletin of the Institute of History and Philology, Academia Sinica 48.2 :205-228. (reprinted in) Gong Hwang-cherng 龔煌城 (2002). 漢藏語硏究論文集 Hanzangyu yanjiulun wenji / Collected Papers on Sino-Tibetan Linguistics. Taipei: 中央硏究院語言學硏究所籌備處 Zhong yang yan jiu yuan yuyanxue yanjiusuo choubeichu: 379–399.
- Gong Hwang-cherng (1980). "A Comparative Study of the Chinese, Tibetan, and Burmese Vowel Systems." Bulletin of the Institute of History and Philology 51.3: 455–490. (reprinted in:) 漢藏語硏究論文集 Hanzangyu yanjiulun wenji / Collected Papers on Sino-Tibetan Linguistics. Taipei: 中央硏究院語言學硏究所籌備處 Zhong yang yan jiu yuan yuyanxue yanjiusuo choubeichu, 2002: 1–30.
- Gong Hwang-cherng (1995). "The System of Finals in Proto-Sino-Tibetan". The Ancestry of the Chinese Language. William S.-Y. Wang, ed. (Journal of Chinese linguistics. Monograph series 8) Berkeley: Project on Linguistic Analysis, University of California: 41–92. (reprinted in:) 漢藏語硏究論文集 Hanzangyu yanjiulun wenji / Collected Papers on Sino-Tibetan Linguistics. Taipei: 中央硏究院語言學硏究所籌備處 Zhong yang yan jiu yuan yuyanxue yanjiusuo choubeichu, 2002: 79–124.
- Gong Hwang-cherng 龔煌城 (1999). 〈西夏語的緊元音及其起源〉 [Tense vowels and their origin in Xixia]. 《中央研究院歷史語言研究所集刊》 [Collected Papers of the Institute of History and Philology of Academia Sinica] 70.2: 531–558.
- Gong Hwang-cherng 龔煌城 (2001). 〈西夏語動詞的人稱呼應音韻轉換〉 [Rime transformation and person agreement in Xixia verbs]. 《語言暨語言學》 [Language and Linguistics] 2.1: 21–67.
