= Tatsuo Nishida =

Linguist and Tangutologist (1928–2012)

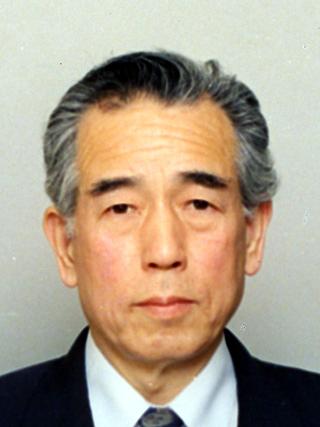
- Tatsuo Nishida (Japan Academy)
- Born: November 26, 1928; Osaka, Japan
- Died: September 26, 2012 (aged 83); Kyoto, Japan
- Citizenship: Japan
- Known for: Study of the Tangut language
- Scientific career
- Fields: Linguistics
- Institutions: Kyoto University
- Academic advisors: Ishihama Juntarō

Tatsuo Nishida (西田 龍雄, Nishida Tatsuo; 26 November 1928 – 26 September 2012) was a professor at Kyoto University. His work encompasses research on a variety of Tibeto-Burman languages, having made great contributions in particular to the deciphering of the Tangut language.

== Biography ==
Born in Osaka, Nishida graduated from the Kyoto University Faculty of Letters in 1951. In 1958 he became assistant professor at Kyoto University. During his studies Ishihama Juntarō and Izui Hisanosuke had a formative impact on him.

In 1958 he was awarded the Japan Academy Prize. In 1962 he received his PhD for his study of Tangut characters. In 1992 he retired as a professor. In 1994 he received the Asahi Award, and in 2005 the Kyoto Culture Prize for Lifetime Achievement.

He died in Kyoto in September 2012.

Nishida's approach, dubbed "philological linguistics" by Shōgaito Masahiro, involved the linguistic study of textual works and the integration of fieldwork on contemporary languages with philological study. In the context of this overall approach, one of his major theoretical contributions was the notion of "sonus grammae", the phonology that is implied by a script system as analytically as differentiable from the phonology of a language that uses the particular script system at a certain time and place.

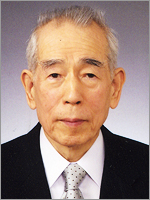
Honor of "Person of Cultural Merit" (2008)

== Works ==
- Nishida Tatsuo 西田 龍雄 (1957). チベット語・ビルマ語語彙比較における問題 [Tibetan and Burmese: Some problems concerning the comparison of Their vocabularies]. 東方学 Tohō Gaku (in Japanese). 15: 64–44.
- Nishida Tatsuo 西田 龍雄 (1958). "チベット語動詞構造の研究 Chibetto go dōshi kōzō no kenkyū" [A study of the Tibetan verbal structure]. 言語研究 Gengo Kenkyū (in Japanese). 33: 21–50.
- Nishida Tatsuo 西田 龍雄 (1963). ヨーロッパにおける東南アジア諸言語の研究について [Studies of Southeast Asian Languages in Europe]. 東南アジア研究 [Southeast Asian Studies] (in Japanese). 1 (2): 67–72. hdl:2433/54826.
- Nishida Tatsuo 西田 龍雄 (1966). アカ語の音素体系: タイ国北部における山地民アカ族の言語の記述的研究 [A Preliminary Report on the Akha Language ―A Language of a Hill Tribe in Northern Thailand]. 音声科学研究 [Studia Phonologica] (in Japanese). 4 (1): 1–36. hdl:2433/52611.
- Nishida Tatsuo 西田 龍雄 (1966). ビス語の研究:タイ国北部におけるビス族の言語の予備的研究 Bisu-go no kenkyū [A Preliminary Study on the Bisu Language: A Language of Northern Thailand, Recently Discovered by Us]. 東南アジア研究 [Southeast Asian Studies] (in Japanese). 4 (1): 65‒87. hdl:2433/55197.
- Nishida Tatsuo 西田 龍雄 (1966). "ビス語の系統 Bisugo no keitō" [A Comparative Study of the Bisu, Akha and Burmese Languages]. 東南アジア研究 [Southeast Asian Studies] (in Japanese). 4 (3): 440–466. hdl:2433/55245.
- Nishida Tatsuo 西田 龍雄 (1967). リス語の研究: タイ国ターク県におけるリス族の言葉の予備報告 [A Preliminary Study on the Lisu Language in Tak Province]. 東南アジア研究 [Southeast Asian Studies] (in Japanese). 5 (2): 276–307. hdl:2433/55386.
- Nishida Tatsuo 西田 龍雄 (1968). リス語の比較研究 Lisu-go no hikaku kenkyū [A Comparative Study of the Lisu Language (Tak Dialect)]. 東南アジア研究 [Southeast Asian Studies] (in Japanese). 6 (1): 2–35.

Nishida Tatsuo 西田 龍雄 (1968). (続)リス語の比較研究 (Zoku) Lisu-go no hikaku kenkyū [A Comparative Study of the Lisu Language (Tak Dialect), Part II]. 東南アジア研究 [Southeast Asian Studies] (in Japanese). 6 (2): 261‒289.

- Nishida Tatsuo 西田 龍雄 (1969). ロロ・ビルマ語比較研究における問題 [Some Problems in Proto Lolo–Burmese]. 東南アジア研究 [Southeast Asian Studies] (in Japanese). 6 (4): 868–889. hdl:2433/55528.
- Nishida Tatsuo 西田 龍雄 (1969). "A Preliminary Study on the Lahu Shi Language in Chiang Rai Province" ラフ・シ語の研究 Rafu-shi-go no kenkyū [A Preliminary Study on the Lahu Shi Language in Chien Rai Province Thailand]. 東南アジア研究 [Southeast Asian Studies] (in Japanese). 7 (1): 1–39. doi:10.20495/tak.7.1_2.
- Nishida Tatsuo 西田 龍雄 (1966). "(Book Review) Mantaro J. Hashimoto. The Hakka Dialect: A Linguistic Study of Its Phonology, Syntax and Lexicon. Cambridge University Press, 1973, xxvi+580p". 東南アジア研究 [Southeast Asian Studies] (in Japanese). 11 (3): 433–438. hdl:2433/55746.
- Nishida Tatsuo 西田 龍雄 (1976). "Hsihsia, Tosu and Lolo–Burmese languages". 音声科学研究 Onsei Kagaku Kenkyū (Studia phonologica). 10: 1–15. hdl:2433/52575.
- Nishida Tatsuo 西田 龍雄 (1977). "Some Problems in the Comparison of Tibetan, Burmese and Kachin Languages". 音声科学研究 Onsei Kagaku Kenkyū (Studia phonologica). 11: 1–24. hdl:2433/52569.

=== Books ===
- 1964. Shina-Chibetto shogo hikaku kenkyū ryakushi シナ・チベット諸語比較研究略史I (Brief history of the comparative study of Sino-Tibetan languages I). Ajia Afurika bunken chōsa hōkoku アジア・アフリカ文獻調査報告 (Asia-Africa studies bibliographical survey report) 53. Tokyo: Ajia Afurika Bunken Chōsa Iinkai アジア・アフリカ文獻調査委員會.
- 1964-66. Seikago no kenkyū: Seikago no saikōsei to Seika moji no kaidoku 西夏語の研究：西夏語の再構成と西夏文字の解読讀 (A study of the Hsi-hsia language: Reconstruction of the Hsi-hsia language and decipherment of the Hsi-hsia script). 2 vols. Tokyo: Zauhō kankōkai 座右寶刊行會 (Chinese translation, Xixiayu yanjiu: Xixiayu de gouni yu Xixia wenzi de jiedu 西夏語研究：西夏語的構疑興西夏文字的解讀. Trans. Lu Zhonghui魯忠慧; ed. Nie Hongyin聶鴻音. Xixia yanjiu 西夏研究 [Xixia studies] 7. Beijing: Zhongguo Shehui Kexue Chubanshe中國社會科學出版社, 2008.)
- 1966. Ikiteiru shōkei moji: Mosozoku no bunka 生きている象形文字：モソ族の文化 (Living pictographic writing: Culture of the Moso people). Tokyo: Chūō Kōronsha 中央公論社. (Enlarged and revised ed., Ikiteiru shōkei moji. Tokyo: Gogatsu Shobō 五月書房, 2001.)
- 1967. Seika moji: Sono kaidoku no purosesu 西夏文字：その解讀のプロセス (Hsi-hsia writing and the process of its decipherment). Tokyo: Kinokyniya Shoten 紀伊國屋書店. (Repr., Tokyo: Kinokuniya Shoten, 1995; England ed., Seika moji: kaidoku no purosesu. Tokyo: Tamagawa Daigaku Shuppanbu 玉川大學出版部, 1980; Chinese translation, Xixia wenzi jiedu 西夏文字解讀. Trans. Na Chuge 那楚格 and Chen Jianling 陳健鈴. Yinchuan 銀川: Ningxia Renmin Chubanshe 寧夏人民出版社, 1998).
- 1970. Seibankan Yakugo no kenkyū: Chibetto gengogaku josetsu 西番館譯語の研究：チベット言語學序説 (A study of the Tibetan-Chinese vocabulary Hsi-fan-kuan i-yu: An introduction to Tibetan linguistics). Ka-i Yakugo kenkyū sōsho 華夷譯語研究叢書1. Kyoto: 松香堂Shōkadō.
- 1972. Mentenkan Yakugo no kenkyū: Biruma gengogaku josetsu 緬甸館譯語の研究：ビルマ言語學序説 (A study of the Burmese-Chinese vocabulary Mien-tien-kuan i-yu: An introduction to Burmese linguistics). Ka-i Yakugo kenkyū sōsho 2. Kyoto: Shōkadō.
- 1973. Tosu Yakugo no kenkyū: Shin gengo Tosugo no kōzō to keitō 多續譯語の研究：新言語トス語の構造と系統 (A study of the Tosu-Chinese vocabulary Tos i-yu: The stricture and linage of Tosu, a new language.) Ka-i Yakugo kenkyū sōsho 6. Kyoto: Shōkadō.
- 1975-77. Seikabun Kegonkyō 西夏文華嚴經 (The Hsi-hsia Avataṁska Sūtra). 3 vols. Kyoto: Kyōto Daigaku Bungakubu 京都大學文學部.
- 1979. Roro Yakugo no kenkyū: Rorogo no kōzō to keitō 倮儸譯語の研究：ロロ語の構造と系統 (A study of the Lolo-Chinese vocabulary Lolo i-yu: The stricture and linage of Shui-liao Lolo.) Ka-i Yakugo kenkyū sōsho 6. Kyoto: Shōkadō.
- 1980. The structure of the Hsi-hsia (Tangut) characters. Trans. James A. Matisoff. Tokyo: Institute for the Study of Languages and Culture of Asia and Africa.
- 1982. Ajia no mikaidoku moji: Sono kaidoku no hanashi アジアの未解讀文字：その解讀の話 (Yet undeciphered scripts in Asia: On their decipherment). Tokyo: Taishūkan Shoten 大修館書店. (Enlarged and revised ed., Ajia kodai moji no kaidoku アジア古代文字の解讀. Tokyo: Chūō Kōron Shinsha 中央公論新社, 2002.)
- 1984. Kanji bunmeiken no shikō chizu: Higashi Ajia shokoku wa kanji wo ikani toriire hen’yō sasetaka 漢字文明圈の思考地圖：東アジア諸國は漢字をいかに採り入れ、變容させたか (Ways of thinking in civilizations using Chinese characters: How did the countries of East Asia adopt and transfigurate Chinese characters?). Kyoto: PHP Kenkyūjo PHP研究所.
- 1986. Ikyō no tami to Orudosu no kōbō 異境の民とオルドスの興亡 (Foreign peoples and the rise and fall of Ordos.) NHK Dai kōga NHK大黄河 (The great Huanghe) 2. Tokyo: Nippon Hōsō Shuppan Kyōkai 日本放送出版協會. (Co-written with NHK Shuzaihan NHK取材班.)
- 1989. Seika moji no hanashi: Shiruku Rōdo no nazo 西夏文字の話：シルクロードの謎 (On Xixia script: Mysteries of the Silk Road). Tokyo: Taishūkan Shoten.
- 1990. Hakuba Yakugo no kenkyū: Hakubago no kōzō to keitō白馬譯語の研究：白馬語の構造と系統 (A study of the Baima-Chinese vocabulary Baima i-yu: The stricture and linage of Baima Language.) Ka-i Yakugo kenkyū sōsho 7. Kyoto: Shōkadō Shoten. (Co-written with Sun Hongkai 孫宏開.)
- 1995. Moji biiki: Moji no essensu wo meguru 3tsu no taiwa 文字贔屓：文字のエッセンスをめぐる3つの對話 (‘Script fan’: Three conversations on the essence of writing system). Tokyo: Sanseidō 三省堂 (Co-written with Kōno Rokurō 河野六郎.)
- 1997. Seika ōkoku no gengo to bunka 西夏大國の言語と文化 (The language and culture of the Kingdom of Xixia). Tokyo: Iwanami Shoten 岩波書店.
- 1998. Seikago kenkyū Shinron 西夏語研究新論 (New approach to the study of the Xixia language). Ed. Nishida Sensei Koki Kinenkai 西田先生古希記念會 (Society for the commemoration of the 70th birthday of Prof. Nishida). Kyoto: Nishida Sensei Koki Kinenkai.
- 2000. Higashi Ajia shogengo no kenkyū I: Kyodai gengogun Shina-Chibetto gozoku no tembō 東アジア諸言語の研究I：巨大言語群シナ・チベット語族の展望 (Studies in East Asian languages 1: Prospects for the huge Sino-Tibetan language family). Kyoto: Kyōto Daigaku Gakujutsu Shuppankai 京都大學額術出版會.
- 2005. Roshia Kagaku Akademī Tōyōgaku kenkyūjo Sankuto Peteruburuku shibu shozō Seikabun “Myōhō Rengekyō” shashinban (Kumārajīva yaku taishō) ロシア科學アカデミー東洋學研究所サンクトペテルブルク支部所蔵西夏文「妙法蓮華經」寫眞版 (鳩摩羅什譯對照) (Текcт Сутры Лотоса на тангутском (Си Ся) языке: из коллекции Санкт-Петербургского филиала Института востоковедения Российской академии наук / Xixia version of the Lotus Sutra: from the collection of the St. Petersburg Branch of the Institute of Oriental Studies of the Russian Academy of Sciences). Tokyo: Soka Gakkai 創價學会.
- 2007. Seikago kenkyū to Hokekyō 西夏語研究と法華經 (Xixia language studies and the Lotus Sutra). 4 pts. in one. Tokyo: Tōyō Tetsugaku Kenkūjo 東洋哲學研究所. (Orig. pub, in Tōyō Gakujutsu Kenkū 東洋學術研究 (The journal of Oriental studies) 44, no. 1 [2005]: 209–36; 44, no. 2 [2005]: 191–216; 45, no. 1 [2006]: 232–72; 45, no. 2 [2006]: 208–47. Repr., in Seikago kenkyū shinron, 2012).
- 2009. Seikabun “Myōhō Rengekyō” yakuchū 西夏文『妙法蓮華經』譯注 (Annotated translation of the Xixia version of the Lotus Sutra). Vol. 1. Tokyo: Tōyō Tetsugaku Kenkūjo.
- 2012. Seikago kenkyū shinron 西夏語研究新論 (New studies of the Xixia language). Ed. Nishida Tatsuo Hakushi Ronshū Kankō Iinkai 西田龍雄博士論集刊行委員会. Kyoto: Shōkadō.

=== Edited books ===
- 1981. Sekai no moji 世界の文字 (Written systems throughout the world). Kōza gengo 講座言語 (Lectures on language) 5. Tokyo: Taishūkan Shoten.
- 1986. Gengogaku wo manabu hito no tame ni 言語學を學ぶ人のために (For those learning linguistics). Kyoto: Sekai Shisōsha 世界思想社.
- 1994. Current issues in Sino-Tibetan linguistics. Osaka: Organizing Committee of the 26th International Conference on Sino-Tibetan Languages and Linguistics. (Co-edited with Kitamura Hajime 木村甫 and Nagano Yasuhiko 長野泰彦.)
- 1999. Каталог тангутских буддийских памятников: Института востоковедения Российской Академии Наук. Киото: Университет Киото. (Co-edited with E. I. Kychanov and Arakawa Shintarō.)
- 2001. Sekai moji jiten 世界文字辭典 (Scripts and writing systems of the world). Gengogaku daijiten bekkan 言語學大字辭典別巻 (The Sanseido encyclopaedia of linguistics: Additional volume). Tokyo: Sanseidō 三省堂. (Co-edited with Kōno Rokurō and Chino Eiichi 千野榮一.)

=== Translations ===
- 1958. (Bernhard Karlgren). Chūgoku no gengo: Sono tokushitsu to rekishi ni tsuite 中國の言語：その特質と歴史について (The Chinese language: An essay on its nature and history). Tokyo: Kōnan Shoin 江南書院. (Co-translated with Ōhara Nobukazu 大原信一, Tsujii Tetsuo 辻井哲雄, and Aiura Takeshi 相浦杲; Repr., Sekai gengogaku meicho senshū: Higashi Ajia gengohen 2, 世界言語學名著選集：東アジア言語編 2, vol, 3. Tokyo: Yumani Shobō ゆまに書房, 2000.)
- 1978. (Sebastian Shaumyan). Tekiyō bunpō nyūmon 適用文法入門 (Applicational grammar: As a semantic theory of natural language/Аппликативная грамматика как семантическая теория естественного языков). Tokyo: Taishūkan Shoten. (Supervision, co-translated with Funayama Chūta 船山仲他.)
- 1981. (Roy Andrew Miller). Nihongo to Arutai shogo: Nihongo no keitō wo saguru 日本語とアルタイ諸語：日本語の系統を探る (Japanese and the other Altaic languages). Tokyo: Taishūkan Shoten. (Supervision, co-translated with Kondō Tatsuo 近藤達夫, Shōgaito Masahiro 庄垣內正弘, Hashimoto Masaru 橋本勝, and Higuchi Kōichi 樋口康一.)

=== Articles ===
- 1953. Birumago on’in taikei no kōzōteki bunseki ビルマ語音韻體系の構造的分析 (A structural analysis of the phonemic system in the Burmese language). Tōhōgaku 東方學 (Eastern studies) 7: 105–21.
- 1954. Tonematica Historica: Tonēmu ni yoru Tai shogo hikaku gengogakuteki kenkyū Tonematica Historica：トネームによるタイ諸語比較言語學 (Tonematica HIstorica: A study of Tai comparative linguistics with reference of toneme). Gengo Kenkyū 言語研究 (Journal of the Linguistic Society of Japan) 25: 1-46.
- 1955-56. Myazedi hibun ni okeru chūko Birumago no kenkyū Myazedi碑文における中古ビルマ語の研究 (Studies in the ancient Burmese language through the Myazedi Inscriptions). 2 pts. Kodaigaku 古代學 (Palaeologia) 4, no. 1 (1955): 17–32; 5, no. 1 (1975): 22–40.
- Nishida Tatsuo 西田 龍雄 (1955). Myzazedki 碑文における中古ビルマ語の研究 Myazedi hibu ni okeru chūko biruma go no kenkyū [Studies in the later ancient Burmese Language through Myazedi Inscriptions]. 古代學 Kodaigaku Palaeologia (in Japanese). 4 (1): 17–31.

Nishida Tatsuo 西田 龍雄 (1955). Myzazedki 碑文における中古ビルマ語の研究 Myazedi hibu ni okeru chūko biruma go no kenkyū [Studies in the later ancient Burmese Language through Myazedi Inscriptions]. 古代學 Kodaigaku Palaeologia (in Japanese). 5 (1): 22–40.

- 1955. Makku-Suigo to Kyōtsū Taigo マック・スイ語と共通タイ語 (Mak-Sui languages and common Tai). Gengo Kenkyū 28: 30–62.
- 1957. Seikago on saikōsei no hōhō 西夏語音再構成 (The method of reconstruction of the His-hsia language). Gengo Kenkyū 31: 67–71.
- 1957. Chibettogo Birumago goi hikaku niokeru mondai チベット語・ビルマ語語彙比較における問題 (Tibetan and Burmese: Some problems concerning the comparison of their vocabularies). Tōhōgaku 15: 48–64.
- 1957-58. Tenri Toshokan shozō Seikago monjo nitsuite 天理圖書館所蔵西夏語文書について (On Xixia documents in the Tenri Central Library). 2 pts. Bibu-ria: Tenri Toshokanpō ビブリア：天理圖書館報 (Biblia: Bulletin of Tenri Cen-tral Library) 9 (1957): 11–17; 11 (1958): 13-20/
- 1958. Pakupa daiji kokubun パクパ大字刻文 (Dhāraṇī inscription in ‘Phags-pa of Chü-yung-kuan). In Kyoyōkan 居庸關 (Chü-yung-kuan: The Buddhist arch of thefourteenth century A.D. and the pass of the Great Wall northwest of Peking), vol. 1, ed. Murata Jirō 村田治郎, 148–60. Kyoto: Kyōto Daigaku Kōgakubu 京都大學工學部 (Faculty of Engineering, Kyoto University).
- 1958. Seika daiji kokubun 西夏大字刻文 (Dhāraṇī inscription in Hsi-hsia of Chü-yung-kuan). In Kyoyōkan, vol. 1: 170–86. Kyoto: Kyōto Daigaku Kōgakubu.
- 1958. Kanji daiji kokubun 漢字大字刻文 (Dhāraṇī inscription in Hsi-hsia of Chü-yung-kuan). In Kyoyōkan, vol. 1: 187–203. Kyoto: Kyōto Daigaku Kōgakubu.
- 1958. Pakupa shōji kokubun パクパ小字刻文 (Hymn inscription in ‘Phags-pa of Chü-yung-kuan). In Kyoyōkan, vol. 1: 243–69. Kyoto: Kyōto Daigaku Kōgakubu.
- 1958. Seika shōji kokubun西夏小字刻文 (Hymn inscription in Hsi-hsia of Chü-yung-kuan). In Kyoyōkan, vol. 1: 279–306. Kyoto: Kyōto Daigaku Kōgakubu.
- 1958. Chibettogo dōshi kōzō no kenkyū チベット語動詞構造の研究 (A study of the Tibetan verbal structure). Gengo Kenkyū 33: 21–50.
- 1958. Chibettogo to Birumago ni okeru tonēmu no taiō ni tsuite チベット語とビルマ語におけるトネームの對應について (Tonemic correspondences between Tibetan and Burmese). Gengo Kenkyū 34: 90–95.
- 1958. Bernhard Karlgren no gyōseki to kangogaku Bernhard Kargrenの業績と漢語學 (Bernhard Karlgren's achievements and Chinese linguistics). In Chūgoku no gengo: sono tokushitsu to rekishi ni tsuite, 119-229 (Appendix). Tokyo: Kōnan Shoin.
- 1958. Seikago no sūshi nitsuite: Sono saikōsei to hikaku gengogakuteki kenkyū 西夏語の數詞について：その再構成と比較言語學的研究 (Numerals of the Xixia language: Their reconstructions and comparative studies). In Ishihama sendei koki kinen tōyōgaku ronsō 石濱先生古稀記念東洋學論叢 (Oriental studies in honour of Juntaro Ishihama, on occasion of his seventieth birthday), ed. Ishihama Sensei Koki Kinenkai 石濱先生古稀記念會 (The committee for the commemoration of Prof. Ishihama's seventieth birthday, Kansai University), 83-131. Osaka: Ishihama Sendei Koki Kinenkai.
- 1958. Chibetto Birumagokei gengo to Taigokei gengo チベット・ビルマ語系言語とタイ語系言語 (Tibeto-Burman languages and Tai languages). In Kotoba no kagaku 1: Kotoba to ningen コトバの科學1：コトバと人間 (The science of language 1: Language and man), ed. Endō Yoshimoto 遠藤嘉基, 238–54. Tokyo: Nakayama Shoten 中山書店.
- 1960. Taigo to Kango タイ語と漢語 (Common Tai and archaic Chinese). Tōzai Gakujutsu Kenkyūjo Ronsō 東西學術研究所論叢 (Transactions of Institute of Oriental and Occidental Studies, Kansai University) 49: 1-15.
- 1960. Kachingo no kenkū: Bamo Hōgen no kijutsu narabini hikaku gengogakuteki kōsatsu カチン語の研究：バモ方言の記述ならびに比較言語學的考察 (A study of the Kachin language: A descriptive and comparative study of Bhamo dialect). Gengo Kenkyū 38: 1-32.
- 1960. The numerals of Hsi-hsia language: Their reconstructions and comparative studies. Memories of the Research Department of the Toyo Bunko 19: 123–67.
- 1960. Chibettogo shinzō goi nitsuite チベット語新造語彙について (On neologisms in Tibetan vocabulary). Nihon Chibetto Gakkai Kaihō 日本西藏學會會報 (Report of the Japanese Association for Tibetan Studies) 6:5-6.
- 1960. Chibetto moji tensha to Chibettogo hyōki チベット文字轉舄とチベット語表記 (The transliteration and transcription of Tibetan). Nihon Chibetto Gakkai Kaihō 7: 1-4 (Co-written with Kitamura Hajime).
- 1961. Seikago to Seika moji 西夏語と西夏文字 (Study of Hsi-hsia: Its language and script). In Chūō Ajia Kodaigo bunken: Bessatsu 中央アジア古代語文獻：別冊 (Buddhist manuscripts and secular documents of the ancient languages in Central Asia: Supplement), Seiiki bunka kenkyū 西域文化研究 (Monumenta Serindica) 4, ed. Seiiki Bunka Kenkyūkai 西域文化研究會 (Research society of Central Asian culture), 389–462. Kyoto: Hōzōkan 法蔵館.
- 1961. 16 seiki niokeru Paiigo-Kango, Kango-Paiigo tangoshū no kenkyū 十六世紀におけるパイ・イ語―漢語，漢語―パイ・イ語單語集の研究 (A study of the 16th century Pai-i=Chinese and Chinese=Pai-i vocabularies). Tōyō Gakuhō 東洋學報 (Reports of the Oriental Society) 43, no. 3: 1-48.
- 1961. Chūgoku shōsū minzoku gengo kōsaku nitsuite 中國少數民族言語工作について (A brief survey of current studies of minority languages in China). Chūgoku Gogaku 中國語學 (Bulletin of the Chinese Language Society of Japan) 108: 13–17.
- 1962. Tenri Toshokanzv Seikabun “Muryō Jusō Yōkyō” nitsuite 天理圖書館藏西夏文『無量壽宗要經』について (The Hsi-hsia version of Wu-liang-shou-tsung yao-ching in the Tenri Central Library). IN Tominaga sensei kakō kinen kohan shoshi ronsō 富永先生華甲記念古版書誌論叢 (Miscellanea typographica et bibliographica), ed. Tenri Toshokan 天理圖書館, 457–66. Tenri 天理: Tenri Daigaku Shuppanbu 天理大學出版部.
- 1962. Ko Nevsky-shi no Seikago kenkyū nitsuite 故Nevsky氏の西夏語研究についてH. A. Невский, Тангутская филология: Исследования и словарь, Издательство восточной литературы, кн 1, 601 стр., кн 2, 683 стр. Москва (On the Nicolas Nevsky's Tangut philology). Gengo Kenkyū 41: 55–65.
- 1963. 16 seiki niokeru Seikōshō Chibettogo Tenzen hōgen nitsuite: Kango-Chi-bettogo tangoshū iwayuru heishubon “Seibankan Yakugo” no kenkyū 十六世紀における西康省チベット語天全方言について：漢語・チベット語單語集いわゆる丙種本『西番館譯語』の研究 (On the T’ien-ch’üan Tibetan dialect of Hsi-K’ang in the sixteenth century: A study of the Chinese-Tibetan vocabulary, Hsi-Fan-Kuan I-yu). Kyōto Daigaku Bungakubu Kenkyū Kiyō 京都大學文學部研究紀要 (Memoirs of the Faculty of Letters, Kyoto University) 7:84-174.
- 1963. Yōroppa niokeru Tōnan Ajia shogengo no kenkyū nitsuite ヨーロッパにおける東南アジア諸言語の研究について (Studies of Southeast Asian languages in Europe). Tōnan Ajia Kenkyū 東南アジア研究 (The Southeast Asian studies) 1, no. 2:67-72.
- 1964. Bitumango to Roro shogo: Sono seichō taikei no hikaku kenkyū ビルマ語とロロ諸語：その聲調體系の比較研究 (Burmese and Lolo dialects [: A comparative study of their tonemic system].) Tōnan Ajia Kenkyū 1, no. 4:13-28.
- 1964. Chibetto gengogaku ni okeru 2, 3 no mondai チベット言語學における二・三の問題 (Some problems in Tibetan linguistics) Nihon Chibetto Gakkai Kaihō 11:6-5.
- 1964. R.B. Jōnzu Jr. cho “Karengo kenkyū: Kijutsu, hikaku, tekisuto” R.B.ジョーンズJr. 著『カレン語研究：記述・比較・テキスト』 (Robert Jones, R.B., Jr.; Karen linguistic studies). Tōyō Gakuhō 46, no. 4:1-13. (Review article)
- 1964. Seikamoji kenkyū sonogo 西夏文字研究その後 (Researches on Hsi-hsia script nowadays). Gengo Seikatsu 言語生活 (Linguistic life) 158:68-73.
- 1965. Minzoku to gengo 民族と言語 (Ethnic groups and languages). In Minzoku chiri 民族地理 (Ethnogeography), ed. Imanishi Kinji 今西錦司 et al., vol. 1:105-20. Tokyo: Asakura Shoten 朝倉書店.
- 1965. Taikoku hokubu no gengo chōsa nitsuite タイ國北部の言語調査について (Some notes on a linguistic survey in northern Thailand). Tōnan Ajia Kenkyū 3, no. 3:117-29.
- 1966. Bisugo no kenkyū: Taikoku hokubu niokeru Bisuzoku no gengo no yobite-ki kenkyū ビス語の研究：タイ國北部におけるビス族の言語の予備的研究 (A Preliminary study on the Bisu language: A language of northern Thailand, recently discovered by us). Tōnan Ajia Kenkyū 4, no. 1:65-87.
- 1966-67. Bisugo no keitō ビス語の系統 (A comparative study of the Bisu, Akha and Burmese languages). 2 pts. Tōnan Ajia Kenkyū 4, no. 3 (1966):440-66; 4, no. 5 (1967): 854–70.
- 1966. Akago no onso taikei: Taikoku hokubu niokeru sanchimin Akazoku no gengo no kijutsuteki kenkyū アカ語の音素體系：タイ國北部における山地民アカ族の言語の記述的研究 (A preliminary report on the Akha language: A language of a hill tribe in the northern Thailand). Onsei Kagaku Kenkyū 音聲科學研究 (Studia phonologica) 4:1-36.
- 1967. Biruma niokeru Pazoku no gengo nitsuite: Nampō Paogo Paanhōgen oboegaki ビルマにおけるパオ族の言語について：南方パオ語パアン方言覺え書き (Notes on the Pao language in Burma: A preliminary study of Southern Pao Pa’an dialekct). Gengo Kenkyū 50: 15–33.
- 1967. Risugo no kenyū: Taikoku Tākuken niokeru Risuzoku no kotoba no yobi hōkoku リス語の研究：タイ國ターク縣におけるリス族の言葉の予備報告 (A preliminary study on the Lisu language in Tak Province). Tōnan Ajia Kenkyū 5, no. 2:276-307.
- 1968. Seikago yaku “Rongo” nitsuite 西夏語譯『論語』について (On the Hsi-hsia version of Lin-yii [Analects]). In Yoshikawa hakushi yaikyū kinen Chūgoku bungaku ronshū 吉川博士退休記念中國文學論集 (Studies in Chinese literature dedicated to Dr. Yoshikawa Kojiro on his sixty-fifth birthday), ed. Yoshikawa Kyōju Taikan Kinen Jigyōkai 吉川教授退官記念事業會, 95-106. Tokyo: Chi-kuma Shobō 筑摩書房.
- 1968. Risugo hikaku kenyū リス語比較研究 (A comparative study of Lisu language [Tak dialect]). 2pts. Tōnan Ajia Kenkyū 6, no. 1:2-35; 6, no. 2:261-89.
- 1968. R. Shēfā cho “Shina-Chibetto gozoku kenyū josetsu, dai 1 bu, dai 2 bu” R.シェーファー著『シナ・チベット語族研究序説 第1部, 第2部』 (Shafer, R.; Introduction to Sino-Tibetan). Tōyō Gakuhō 51, no. 1:1-29. (Review article)
- 1968. Seika moji nokaidoku 西夏文字の解讀 (Decipherment of the Hsi-hsia script). Sūri Kagaku 數理科學 (Mathematical science) 6, no. 11:61-66.
- 1968. Ajia no moji no hanashi アジアの文字の話 (The story of Asian scripts). Kotoba no uchū ことばの宇宙 (The linguistic cosmos) 11:7-81.
- 1968. Seikago no kenyū 西夏語の研究 (The study of the Hsi-hsia language). Gakujutsu Geppō 學術月報 (Japanese scientific monthly) 21, no. 2:2-6.
- 1969. Seika no bukkyō nitsuite 西夏の佛教について (Buddhism of the Hsi-hsia kingdom). Nanto Bukkyō 南都佛教 (Journal of the Nanto Society for Buddhist Studies) 22:1-19.
- 1969. Roro Birumago hikaku kenkyū niokeru mondai ロロ・ビルマ語比較研究における問題 (Some problems in proto Lolo-Burmese). Tōnan Ajia Kenkyū 6, no. 4:868-99.
- 1969. Rahu shigo no kenyū: Taikoku Chenraiken niokeru Rahushizoku no gengo no yobi hōkoku ラフ・シ語の研究：タイ國チェンライ縣におけるラフ・シ族の言葉の予備報告 (A preliminary study on the Lahu Shi language in Chiang Rai Province). Tōnan Ajia Kenkyū 7, no. 1:2-39.
- 1969. A. G. Ōdorikūru hen “Savina no Bêgo jiten (Kainantō no gengo)” A.G.オードリクール編『SavinaのBê (倍) 語辭典 (海南島の言語) 』 (Haudricourt, A. G.: Le vocabulaire Bê de F. M. Savina). Tōyō Gakuhō 52, no. 1:1-14. (Review article)
- 1969. E. I. Kuchānofu nado cho “Bunkai: Tangūto go kanpon no hukusei” E. И. クチャーノフ等著『「文海」：タングート語刊本の複製』(Kychanov, E. I. i drugie: More Pis´men). Tōyō Gakuhō 52, no. 2:1-19. (Review article)
- 1969. Seika 西夏 (Hsi-hsia). In Seika rekishi shirīzu 12: Mongoru Teikoku 世界歴史シリーズ12：モンゴル帝國 (World history series 12: The Mongol Empire), 80–86. Tokyo: Sekai Bunkasha 世界文化社.
- 1970. Seika ōkoku no seikaku to sono bunka西夏王國の性格とその文化 (The character of the Hsi-hsia Kingdom and its culture). In Iwanami kōza sekai rekishi 9: Chūsei 3; Nairiku Ajia sekai no tenkai 1 岩波講座世界歴史9：中世3：内陸アジア世界の展開1 (Iwanami lectures on world history 9: The medieval world 3; The development of the Inner Asian World 1), ed. Ara Matsuo 荒松雄 et al., 63–86. Tokyo: Iwanami Shoten.
- 1972. Shin gengo Tosugo no seikaku to keitō 新言語トス語の性格と系統 (A study of the Tosu language: Its character and lineage). In Tōhō Gakkai sōritsu 25 shūnen kinen Tōhōgaku ronshū 東方學會創立25周年記念東方學論集 (“Eastern studies” twenty-fifth anniversary volume), ed. Tōhō Gakkai 東方學會, 854–41. Tokyo: Tōhō Gakkai.
- 1973. A preliminary study of the Bisu language: A language of northern Thai-land, recently discovered by us. In Papers in South East Asian Linguistics, no. 3 (Pacific Linguistics, Series A-30), ed. D. W. Dellinger, 55–82. Canberra: Linguistic Circle of Canberra.
- 1973. Giji kanji nitsuite 擬似漢字について (On quasi-Chinese characters). Enajī エナジー (Energy) 10, no. 2:36-42.
- 1973. Moji dake ga nokotta gengo Tosugo nitsuite 文字だけが残った言語：トス語について (Tosu: A dead language). Asahi Ajia Rebyū 朝日アジア・レビュー (The Asahi Asia review) 16:154-55.
- 1975. Chūgoku Kōnan no hi-Kanminzoku to sono gengo 中國江南地域の非漢民族とその言語 (Non-Han Chinese peoples in trans-Yangijiang region and their languages). In Wa to Wajin no sekai 倭と倭人の世界 (The world of the kingdom of Wo and its subjects), ed. Kokubu Naoichi 國分直一, 139–167. Tokyo: Mainishi Shinbunsha 毎日新聞社.
- 1975. Kanji wo megutte 漢字をめぐって (On Chinese characters). Gekkan Gengo 月刊言語 (Linguistics monthly) 4, no. 8:37-45.
- 1975. Seiiki no gengo no hensen to Chūgokugo 西域の言語の變遷と中國語 (Chinese and the development of the languages in Central Asia). Chūgoku no Gengo to Bunka 中國の言語と文化 (Language and culture in China) 4:1-9.
- 1975. On the development of tones in Tibetan. Acta Asiatica 29 (Special issue: Tibetan studies in Japan): 43–55.
- 1975. Common Tai and archaic Chinese. Onsei Kagaku Kenkyū 9:1-12.
- 1976-77. NIhingo no keitō wo motomete: Nihongo to Chibetto Birumago 日本語の系統を求めて：日本語とチベット・ビルマ語 (Inquiry into lineage of the Japanese language: Japanese and Tibeto-Burman). 4 pts. Gekkan Gengo 5, no. 6 (1976): 74–86; 5, no. 7 (1976): 64–76; 5, no. 8 (1976): 74–83; 6, no. 5 (1977): 84–92.
- 1976. Hsihsia, Tosu, and Lol-Burmese languages. Onsei Kagaku Kenkyū 10:1-15.
- 1977. Kodai moji kaidoku no hanashi 古代文字解讀のはなし (The story of the decipherment of ancient scripts). Gekkan Gengo 6, no. 4:16-26.
- 1977. Zoku Nihongo no keitō wo motomete: Nihongo to Chibetto Birumago 續・日本語の系統を求めて：日本語とチベット・ビルマ語 (Continued inquiry into lineage of the Japanese language: Japanese and Tibeto-Burman). 3pts. Gekkan Gengo 6, no. 4:16-26.
- 1977. Some problems in the comparison of Tibetan, Burmese and Kachin languages. Onsei Kagaku Kenkyū 11:1-24.
- 1978. Nihongo no keitō 日本語の系統 (The lineage of the Japanese language). In Shinpen kokugoshi gaisetsu 新編國語史槪説 (general history of the Japanese language, new edition), ed. Kasuga Kazuo 春日和男, 61–69. Tokyo: Yūseidō 有精堂.
- 1978. Chibetto-Birumago to Nihongo チベット・ビルマ語と日本語 (Tibeto-Burman and Japanese). In Iwanami kōza Nihongo 12: Nihongo no keitō to rekishi 岩波講座日本語12：日本語の系統と歴史 (Iwanami lectures on Japanese 12: The linage and history), ed. Kazama kiyozō 風間喜代三 et al., 227–300. Tokyo: Iwanami Shoten.
- 1978. Seika moji oboegaki 西夏文字覺書 (Notes on the Hsi-hsia script). Shiruku Rōdo シルク・ロード (Silk Road) 4, no. 2/3:48-50.
- 1978. Chibettogo Seikago kenkyū no genjō チベット・西夏語研究の現狀 (The present situation of Tibetan and Hsi-hsia linguistic studies). Gekkan Gengo 7, no. 7:65-66.
- 1979. Nihongo no keitō 日本語の系統 (The lineage of the Japanese language). In Zusetsu Nihon bunka no rekishi 圖說日本文化の歴史 (Illustrated history of Japanese culture), vol. 1, ed. Higuchi Takayasu 樋口隆康 et al., 231–42. Tokyo: Shōgakkan 小學館.
- 1979. Ropago no keitō 珞巴語の系統 (The lineage of the Lhopa language). Gekkan Gengo 8, no. 7:70-77.
- 1979. Seichō no hassei to gengo no henka 聲調の發生と言語の變化 (Tone genesis and language change). Gekkan Gengo 8, no. 11:26-35.
- 1979. Chibetto Biruma shogo to gengogaku チベット・ビルマ諸語と言語學 (The Tibeto-Burman languages in recent linguistic studies). Gengo Kenkyū 76:1-28.
- 1979. Lolo-Burmese studies I. Onsei Kagaku Kenkyū 12:1-24.
- 1979. Ruibetsushi nado wo megutte 類別詞などをめぐって (On classifiers, etc.). In Nihon no gengogaku 4: Bunpō 日本の言語學4：文法 (Linguistics in Japan 4: Grammar), ed. Hattori Shirō 服部四郎, Kawamoto Shigeo 川本茂雄, and Shi-bata Takeshi 柴田武, 3–5. Tokyo: Taishūkan Shoten.
- 1980. Chūgoku shōsū minzoku no gengo nitsuite 中國少數民族の言語について (On minority languages in southwestern China). Gekkan Gengo 9, no. 3:13-19.
- 1980. Chūgoku seinanbu no Roro moji 中國西南部のロロ文字 (The Lolo script in southwestern China). 3 pts. Gekkan Gengo 9, no. 4:64-70; no. 5:90-96; 9, no. 7:82-88.
- 1980. Seikago butten nitsuite 西夏語佛典について (The Buddhist scripture in Hsi-hsia.) In Zoku Shirukurōdo to Bukkyō bunka 續・シルクロードと佛教文化 (The Silk Road and Buddhist culture, continued), vol. 2, ed. Higuchi Takayasu, 211–48. Tokyo: Tōkyō Tetsugaku Kenkyūjo.
- 1980. Chibetto Biurmago to Nihongo チベット語・ビルマ語と日本語 (Tibetan, Burmese, and Japanese languages). In Nihongo no keitō 日本語の系統 (The lineage of the Japanese language), ed. Ōno susumu 大野晉, 110–35. Tokyo: Shibundō 至文堂.
- 1980. Sui moji reki no kaidoku 水文字暦の解讀 (Decipherment of the Sui calendar). Gekkan Gengo 9, no. 8:88-95.
- 1980. Seika moji: Soshiki to un’yō 西夏文字：組織と運用 (Xixia script: Its structure and use). 2 pts. Gekkan Gengo 9, no. 9:76-82; 9, no. 10:94-101.
- 1980. Joshin moji: sono seiritsu to hatten女眞文字：その成立と發展 (Jurchen script: Its origins and development). 2 pts. Gekkan Gengo 9, no. 11:96-103; 9, no. 12:97-103.
- 1981-83. Seikago inzu “Goon Setsuin” no kenkyū 西夏語韻圖『五音切韻』の研究 (A study of the Hsihsia rhyme tables ‘Wŭ yīn qiè yùn’). 3pts. Kyōto Daigaku Bunkabu Kenkyū Kiyō 20 (1981): 91-147; 21 (1982): 1–100; 22 (1983): 1–187.
- 1981. Kittan moji: Sono kaidoku no shintenkai 契丹文字：その解讀の新展開 (Kitai script: A new stage of its decipherment). 3 pts. Gekkan Gengo 10, no. 1:112-19; 10, no. 2:106-12; 10, no. 3:109-16.
- 1981. Kanji kara umareta moji: Giji kanji 漢字から生れた文字：擬似漢字 (Characters created from Chinese ideographs: Quasi-Chinese characters). Gekkan Gengo 10, no. 7:61-72.
- 1981. Konmei no jiin nite 昆明の寺院にて (At a Buddhist temple in Kunming). Gekkan Gengo 10, no. 7:61-74.
- 1981. Ban Kan goji shōchūju 番漢合時掌中珠 (On the Xixia-Chinese vocabulary, Panhan Heishi Zhanzhongzhu, ‘The timely pearl in the palm’). In Inoue Yasushi rekishi shōsetsushū geppō 井上靖歴史小說集月報 (Inoue Yasushi historical novel series monthly report), col. 1:1-5. Tokyo: Iwanami Shoten.
- 1981. Shigo kaidoku 死語の解讀 (The decipherment of the dead language). In Watashi no Shiruku Rōdo わたしのシルクロード (My Silk Road), ed. Nippon Hōsō Kyōkai 日本放送協會, 92-101. Tokyo: Nippon Hōsō Kyōkai.
- 1982. Chibetto goi taikei no kōsatsu チベット語語彙體系の考察 (A study of the Tibetan lexical system). In Chibetto goshi no kenkyū: Ōgata jiten no hensan wo mezashite チベット語史の研究：大型辭典の編纂を目指して (Studies in the history of Tibet: Towards a compilation of an unabridged dictionary), Shōwa 55, 56 nendo Kagaku Kenkyūhi Hojokin ippan kenkyū (A) seika hōkokusho 昭和55・56年度科學研究費補助金一般研究 (A) 成果報告書 (Final report of Grant-in-Aid for Scientific Research), 2-14. Kyoto: Kyoto Daigaku Bungakubu.
- 1982. Shigo kenkyū no hanashi 死語研究の話 (On research in dead languages). Gekkan Gengo 11, no. 6:26-27.
- 1983. Atarashii gengo to atarashii moji: Chūgoku Shisenshō no Arusugo to Aru-su shōkeimoji 新しい言語と新しい文字：中國四川州のアルス語とアルス象形文字 (A new language and new script: Ersu language and Ersu pictographical script in Sichuan Province, China). Gekkan Gengo 12, no. 2:88-97.
- 1983. Chibettogo no rekishi to hōgen kenkyū no mondai チベット語の歴史と方言研究の問題 (Problems in the history of the Tibetan language and the study of dialects). In Chibetto bunka no sōgōteki kenkyū チベット文化の總合的研究 (An integrated study of Tibetan culture), Shōwa 57 nendo tokutei kenkyū hōkokusho 昭和57年度特定研究報告書 (Final report of Grant-in-Aid for Scientific Research), 3-20. Kyoto: Kyoto Daigaku Bungakubu.
- 1984. Moji no shurui to kinō 文字の種類と機能：文字學序說 (The kinds and function of writing: An introduction to grammatology). Gekkan Gengo 13, no. 4:90-99.
- 1984. Shi Kinha, Haku Hin, Kō Shinka “Bunkai kenkyū” 史金波・白濱・黄振華『文海研究』 (Shih Chin-po, Pai Pin, and Huang Chên-hua, Wên-hai chien-chiu). Tōyō Gakuhō 65, no. 3/4:232-45. (Review Articule)
- 1984. Ōsutin Heiru cho “Chibetto Biruma shogo no kenkyū” オースティン・ヘイル著『チベット・ビルマ諸語の研究』 (Hale, A.: Research on Tibeto-Bur-man languages). Tōyō Gakuhō 65, no. 3/4:1-11. (Review Articule)
- 1984. Seika no ryōbo wo tazunete 西夏の陵墓を訪ねて (A visit to the Xixian royal mausolea). Gekkan Gengo 13, no. 12:16-21.
- 1985. Seikago dōshiku kōzō no kōsatsu 西夏語動詞句構造の考察 (A study of the structure of verb phrases in the Xixia language). INChibetto Biruma shogo no gengo ruikeifakuteki kenkyū チベット・ビルマ諸語の言語類型學的研究 (Ty-pological studies in Tibeto-Burman languages), Shōwa 59 nendo Kagaku Kenkyūhi Hojokin sōgō kenkyū (A) kenkyū seika hōkokusho 昭和59年度科學研究費補助金總合研究 (A) 研究成果報告書 (Final report of Grant-in-Aid for Scientific Research), 2-25. Kyoto: KyotoDaigaku Bungakubu.
- 1985. The Hsihsia, Lolo, and Moso languages. In Linguistics of the Sino-Tibetan area: The state of the art; Papers presented to Paul K. Benedict for his 71st birthday (Pacific Linguistics, Series C-87, Special Number), ed. Graham Thurgood, James A. Matisoff, and David Bradley, 230–41. Canberra: Research School of Pacific and Asian Studies, Australian National University.
- 1985. Saikin no Seikago kenkyū 最近の西夏語研究 (Recent research on the Xixia language). Hakuen 泊園24:38-49.
- 1986. Kittan, Seika, Joshin moji no shutsugen 契丹・西夏・女眞文字の出現 (Emergence of Kitai, Xixia, and Jurchen scripts). In Higashi Ajia sekai niokeru Nihon kodaishi kōza 8: Higashi Ajia no henbō to kokufū bunka 東アジア世界における日本古代史講座8：東アジアの變貌と國風文化 (Lecture on the history of ancient Japan within the East Asian world 8: The transfiguration of East Asia and indigenous Japanese culture), ed. Inoue Mitsusada 井上光貞, et al., 48–74. Tokyo: Gakuseisha 學生社.
- 1986. Seikago “Getsugetsu rakushi” no kenkyū 西夏語『月々樂時』の研究 (A study of the Hsihsia poem “Yuè yuè lè shī”) Kyōto Daigaku Bungakubu Kenkyū Kiyō 25:1-116.
- 1986. Neika to Seika ōkoku 寧夏と西夏王国 (Ningxia and the Kingdom of Xi-xia). In NHK tokushū gaidobukku: Daikōga NHK特集ガイドブック：大黄河 (The great Huanghe), ed. NHK Jigyōbu, 34–35. Tokyo: Nippon Hōsō Kyōkai.
- 1986. Nishida Tatsuo no gengogaku gairon: Sōtairon to fuhenron 西田龍雄の言語學概論：相對論と普遍論 (Introduction to linguistics by Nishida Tatsuo: Relativism and universality). Gakken Gengo 16, 5:82-83.
- 1987. Higashi Ajia niokeru seichō gengo no hatten 東アジアにおける聲調言語の發展 (Development of tonal languages in East Asia). Gakken Gengo 16, no. 7:54-69.
- 1987. Chibettogo no hensen to moji チベット語の變遷と文字 (History of the Tibetan language and its script). In Kitamura Hajime kyōju taikan kinen ronbunshū: Chibetto no gengo to bunka 北村甫教授退官記念論文集：チベットの言語と文化 (Language and culture in Tibet: Collected papers commemorating the retirement of Prof. Kitamura Hajime), ed. Nagano Yasuhiko and Tachikawa Musashi, 108–69. Tokyo: Tōjusha 冬樹社.
- 1987. Trunggo oyobi Nugo no ichi nitsuite 獨龍語および怒語の位置について (On the linguistic position of the Trung and Nu languages). In Tōhō Gakkai sōritsu 40 shūnen kinen Tōhō ronshū 東方學會創立40周年記念東方學論集 (“Eastern Studies” fortieth anniversary volume), ed. Tōhō Gakkai, 973–88. Tokyo: Tōhō Gakkai.
- 1987. Kanji no seisei hatten to “giji kanji” no shosō 漢字の生成発展と"擬似漢字"の諸相 (The development of Chinese characters and various aspects of quasi-Chinese characters). Shodō Kenkyū 書道研究 (Calligraphy studies) 1, no. 9:31-41.
- 1987. A study of the structure of Hsihsia verb phrases. Memoirs of the Research Department of the Toyo Bunko 45:1-24.
- 1987. On the linguistic position of the Kham language in West Nepal: some provisional observations. Onsei Kagaku Kenkyū 21:1-9.
- 1989. Ao Nagāgo アオ・ナガー語 (Ao Naga), and other 3 items (Akha, Achang, Kachin). In Gengogaku daijiten 言語學大辭典 (The Sanseido encyclopaedia of linguistics), vol. 1. Sekai gengohen 世界言語編 (Languages of the world), pt. 1, ed. Kamei Takashi, Kōno Rokurō, and Chino Eiichi, 133–37, 137–42, 183–91, 1176–88. Tokyo: Sanseidō.
- 1988-90. Seika ōkoku no bunka 西夏王國の文化 (The culture of the Kingdom of Xixia). 10 pts. Shuppan Daijesto 出版ダイジェスト (Publication digest). Tokyo: Nigensha 二玄社.
- 1989. Shina-Chibetto gozoku シナ・チベット語族 (Sino-Tibetan), and other 12 items (Hsi-hsia/Xixia, Sema Naga, Tanghul, Naga, Jino, Tibetan [Historical], Tibeto-Burman, Chang, Chin Languages, Tangla, mTsho-sna/Tsho-na Mon-pa, Tipura/Kokborok, Naxi/Nakhi). In Gengogaku daijiten, vol. 2, Sekai gengohen, pt. 2, ed. Kamei Takeshi, Kōno Rokurō, and Chino Eiichi, 166–87, 408–29, 457–64, 698–704, 733–40, 746–61, 791–822, 864–68, 995–1008, 1017–27, 1046–52, 1117–22, 1444–51. Tokyo: Sanseidō.
- 1989. On the mTsho-sna Mon-pa language in China. In Prosodic analysis and Asian linguistics, to honor R. K.Sprigg (Pacific linguistics, Series C, no. 104), ed. David Bradley, Eugénie J. A. Henderson, and Martine Mazaudon, 223–36. Canberra: Department of Linguistics, Research School of Pacific Studies, Australian National University.
- 1989. Moji to michi 文字と道 (Writing and roadways). In Shūkan Asahi hyakka sekai no rekishi 35: Moji to michi, tsitaeau ‘kokoro’ 週刊朝日百科世界の歴史35：文字と道―傳えあう「こころ」 (Asahi world history encyclopedia monthly 35: Writing and roadways), 210–14. Tokyo: Asahi Shinbunsha 朝日新聞社.
- 1990. Seika moji no sekai: Moji no soshiki to un’yō 西夏文字の世界：文字の組織と運用 (The world of Xixia script: Its structure and use). Mizukuki 水莖 (Calligraphy) 8:26-34.
- 1990. Higashi Ajia niokeru gengo sesshoku to kongōgo no seiritsu 東アジアにおける言語接触と混合語の成立 (Linguistic contact and the formation of hybrid languages in East Asia). In Higashi Ajia niokeru bunka Kōryū to gengo sesshoku no kenkyū: Chūgoku Chibetto Indo wo chūshin ni 東アジアにおける文化交流と言語接触の研究：中國・チベット・インドを中心に (Studies in cultural exchange and linguistic contact in East Asia: The cases of China, Tibet, and India), To-kutei kenkyū hōkokusho 特定研究報告書, ed. Nishida Tatsuo, 1-19. Kyoto: Kyōto Daigaku Bungakubu.
- 1990. Seika no koshakyō 西夏の古寫經 (Ancient Buddhist manuscripts in Xixia). Shodō Kenkyū 4, no. 2:93-99.
- 1991. Shingengo ‘Hakubago’ wo kataru: Gendai Hakubago to yomigaeru 18 seiki Hakubago 新言語「白馬語」を語る：現代白馬語と甦る十八世紀白馬語 (On the newly discovered Baima language: Contemporary and revivied 18th century Baima). Gekkan Gengo 16, no. 1:28-32.
- 1991. Shōkei moji no sekai 象形文字の世界 (The world of pictographic writing). In Nenkan Nihon no Taipodirekushon ’90 年艦日本のタイポディレクション ’90 (Typodirection in Japan, 1990), ed. Tōkyō Taipodirekutāzu Kurabu 東京タイポディレクターズクラブ, 12–23. Tokyo: Kōdansha 講談社.
- 1992. Guanyu Qidan xiaozi yanjiu zhong de jibenxing wenti關于契丹小字研究中的基本性問題 (Fundamental issues in the study of Kitai small script). Minzu Yuwen 民族語文 (Minority languages of China) 1992, no. 2:10-13.
- 1992. Mojigaku to Higashi Ajia no sekai 文字學と東アジアの世界 (Grammatology and the East Asian world). In Bunka toshiteno gakujutsu jōhō 文化としての學術情報 (Science information data as cultural expression), ed. Gakujutsu Jōhō Sentā 學術情報センター (National Center for Science Information Systems), 31–61. Tokyo: Mita Shuppankai 三田出版會.
- 1992. Hanigo ハニ語 (Hani), and Bodo nagāgo ボド・ナガー語 (Bodo-Naga languages). In Gengogaku daijiten, vol. 3, Sekai gengohen, pt. 3–1, ed. Kamei Takeshi, Kōno Rokurō and Chino Eiichi, 186-97 1097–99. Tokyo: Sanseidō.
- 1992. Mikirugo ミキル語 (Mikir), and other 4 items (Mishmi, Lisu, Lho-pa, Lolo). In Gengogaku daijiten, vol. 3, Sekai gengohen, pt. 3–2, ed. Kamei Takeshi, Kōno Rokurō and Chino Eiichi, 245-52 268–84, 751–60, 1055–67, 1099–1113. Tokyo: Sanseidō.
- 1992. Chibettogo jiten no hanashi チベット語辭典の話 (On Tibetan dictionaries). In Jisho wo kataru辭辞を語る (On dictionaries), ed. Iwanami Shinsho Henshūbu 岩波新書編集部, 166–75. Tokyo: Iwanami Shoten.
- 1993. Gotongo 五屯語 (Wutun), and other 13 items (Sangqhong, Si-Lo-Mo group, Languages of the Tribal Corridor Area in West Sichuan, Tujia, Tosu, Nu, Bai, Baima, Pyen, Bisu, Phunoi, Mpi, Lahu). In Gengogaku daijiten, vol. 5, Hoi, Gengomei sakuinhen 補遺・言語名索引編 (Supplement and index), ed. Kamei Takeshi, Kōno Rokurō and Chino Eiichi, 146–50, 166–70, 194–95, 197–98, 225–30, 241–45, 263–80, 281–87, 293–301, 311–13, 313–22, 324–31, 362–66, 377–89. Tokyo: Sanseidō.
- 1993. Chibettozoku no kotowaza チベット族のことわざ (Tibetan proverbs). In Gakujutsu shinkō no susume 學術振興のすすめ (For the promotion of science), vol. 3, ed. Sawada Toshio 澤田敏男, 146–68. Tokyo: Nihon Gakujutsu Shinkōkai 日本學術振興會.
- 1994. Kan Zō gozoku kanken 漢藏語族管見 (Insights into Sino-Tibetan language family). Minpaku Tsūshin 民博通信 (National Museum of Ethnology newsletter) 65:2-25.
- 1994. A personal view of the Sino-Tibetan language family. In Current issues in Sino-Tibetan linguistics, ed. Kitamura Hajime, Nishida Tatsuo, and Nagano Yasuhiko, 1-22. Osaka: Organizing Committee of the 26th International Conference on Sino-Tibetan Languages and Linguistics.
- 1995. Shirukurōdo ‘Seika’ no kotowaza シルクロード＜西夏＞のことわざ (Silk Road <Xixia> proverbs). In Sekai kotowaza daijiten 世界ことわざ大事典 (Encyclopedia of world proverbs), ed. Shibata Takshi 柴田武, Tanikawa Shuntarō 谷川俊太郎, and Yagawa Sumiko 矢川澄子, 1102–11. Tokyo: Taishūkan Sho-ten.
- 1995. Rin Eiritsu cho “Kayaku “Sonshi Heihō” kenkyū" jrōsatsu gesatsu 林英津著『夏譯‹孫子兵法›研究』上冊・下冊 (Lin Ying-chin, Hsia I “Sun izǔ ping-fa” yen-chiu 1, 2). Tōyō Gakuhō 77, no. 1/2:35-44. (Review article)
- 1995. Shi Kinha, Kō Shinka, Jō kōon cho “Ruirin kenkyū” 史金波・黄振華・聶鴻音著『類林研究』 (Shih Chin-po, Huang Tsêng-hua, Nieh Hung-yin, Lei-lin yen-chiu). Tōyō Gakuhō 77, no. 1/2:45-54. (Review article)
- 1996. Shigengo no fukugen to hyōki moji no kaidoku: Seikago to Seika moji no tokusei 死言語の復元と表意文字の解讀：西夏語と西夏文字の特性 (Reviving dead languages and deciphering ideographs: Characteristic features of the Xixia language and script). Gekkan Gengo 25, no. 8:28-36.
- 1996. Higashi Ajia no moji 東アジアの文字 (The writings of East Asia). Kokusai Bunka Kenshū 國際文化研修 (Journal of Japan Intercultural Academy of Municipalities) 3, no. 4:18-24.
- 1997. Kanji shūhen no moji to Seika moji 漢字周邊の文字と西夏文字 (Xixia script and other scripts in the ‘Chinese character’ periphery). In Sho no uchū 9: Kotoba to sho no sugata 書の宇宙9：言葉と書の姿 (Cosmos of the calligraphy: Language and forms of writing), ed. Ishikawa Kyūyō 石川九楊, 66–75. Tokyo: Nigensha.
- 1997. Seika moji shinkō 西夏文字新考 (A new study of the Hsi-hsia writing system), In Tōhō Gakkai sōritsu 50 shūnen kinen Tōhōgaku ronshū 東方學會創立50周年記念東方學論集 (“Eastern Studies” fiftieth anniversary volume), ed. Tōhō Gakkai, 1335–48. Tokyo: Tōhv Gakkai.
- 1997. Seika moji: Kanji wo koeta hyōimoji no kessaku 西夏文字：漢字を超えた表意文字の傑作 (Xixia writing: Ideographic script par excellence, beyond Chinese script). Shinika しにか (Sinica) 8, no. 6:18-27.
- 1997. Seika moji no tokusei to Seikago no fukugen 西夏文字の特性と西夏語の復元 (Characteristics of Xixia writing and reviving the Xixia language). In Asia cheminjok ǔi munka아시아諸民族의文字 (Writing of the Asian peoples), ed. Kugyŏl Hakhoe 口訣學會, 149–61. Seoul: T’aehaksa 太學社. (Korean transla-tion, Sŏha munja ŭi t’ŭksŏng kwa Sŏhaŏ ŭi pugwŏn 西夏文字의과西夏語의復元, 162–72.)
- 1997. Chin Hoa cho “Ron gogen sesshoku yo gogen renmei”: Gengo sesshoku ha saigen naku shakuyō wo motarashiuruka; Atarashii gengo renmeiron no teishō 陳保亜著『論語源接触興語源聯盟』：言語接触は際限なく借用をもたらしうるか；新しい言語連盟論の提唱 (On Chen Baoya's Treatise on language contact and language union: Does linguistic contact cause unlimited borrowing? A new approach to language union). Tōhō 東方 (Eastern book review) 198:40-44. (Review article)
- 1997. Guanyu Peng (hpun) yu zai Mianyuzhi zhong de diwei 關于捧 (hpun) 語在緬語支中的地位 (On the linguistic position of Hpun in Burmish languages). In Yi-Mianyu yanjiu彜緬語研究 (Studies on Yi-Burmese languages), ed. “Guoji Yi-Mianyu Xueshu Huiyi” Luwen Bianji Weiyuanhui〈國際彜緬語學術會議〉論文編集委員會, 574–88. Chengdu: Sichuan Minzu Chupanshe 四川民族出版社.
- 1998. Seikamoji no tokusei: Sono moji soshiki no shin kenkyū 西夏文字の特性：その文字組織の新研究 (Characteristics of Xixia script: New studies on the Xixia writing system). In Nicchū gōdō moji bunka kentōkai happyō ronbunshū 日中合同文字文化検討會發表論文集 (Proceedings of the Japan-China Joint Conference on Writing Culture), ed. Moji Bunka Kenkyūjo 文字文化研究所, 27–34. Kyoto: Moji Bunka Kenkyūjo. (Chinese translation, Xixia wenzi de texing: Xixia wenzi zucheng zhi xintan 西夏文字的特性：西夏文字組成之新探, 135–45.)
- 1998. Xixia wenzi de texing he Xixiayu de shengdiao bianhua: Xixia wenzi xinkao 西夏文字的特性和西夏語的聲調變化：西夏文字新考 (The characteristics of Xixia writing and Xixia tone change: A new approach). In Shoujie Xixiaxue guoji xueshu huiyi lunwenji 首届西夏學國際學術會議論文集 (Proceedings of the First International Conference of the Xixia Studies), ed. Li Fanwen 李範文, 386–92. Yinchuan 銀川: Ningxia Renmin Chubanshe 寧夏人民出版社.
- 1998. Chūgoku shōsū minzoku no henkei kanji 中國少數民族の變形漢字 (Variant Chinese characters in use among China's minorities). Kokusai Kōryū 國際交流 (International cultural exchange) 78:66-69.
- 1998. Mottomo jisū no ōi moji taikei: Moji soshiki to jisū 最も字數の多い文字體系：文字組織と字數 (The writing system with the largest amount of charac-ters: Structure and number of characters). Gekkan Gengo 27, no. 5:90-94.
- 1998. Seikamoji kaidoku no shindankai 西夏文字解讀の新段階 (A new stage in the decipherment of Xixia writing). Yuriika ユリイカ (Eureka) 30, no. 6:68-76.
- 1999. Seikago butten mokuroku hensanjō no shomondai 西夏語佛典目錄編纂上の諸問題 (Problems of compiling catalogues of Xixia Buddhist scriptures). In Каталог тангутских буддийских памятников, ed. Nishida Tatsuo, E. I. Kychanov, and Arakawa Shintarō, ix-xlix, Kyoto: Kyoto University.
- 2001. I moji 彝文字 (Yi [Lolo] script), and 33 other items (Vai, Khamti, Kitai, Yi standard writing, White Tai, Goba, Sibe, Shapa, Jurchen, Sui, Hsi-hsia/Xi-xia, Tai Na, Tai Pong, Tai Lue, Daba, Chuang, Nakhi/Naxi, Nü shu/Women's script, Norā, Bai, Papai, Bmum, Petroglyphs in East Asia, Writing systems in East Asia, Pai-yi, Fraser, Pollard, Malimasa, Miao, Mende, Rarkho, Lisu syllabic script, Lepcha). In Gengogaku daijiten, additional vol., Sekai moji jiten 世界文字辭典 (Scripts and writing systems of the world), ed. Kōno Rokurō, Chino Eiichi, and Nishida Tatsuo, 83–91, 116–17, 248–50, 295–308, 308–12, 343–45, 434–36, 477–78, 480–82, 503–11, 523–26, 537–47, 569–73, 573–74, 574–79, 580–82, 605–9, 684–92, 706–10, 718–19, 721–22, 741–45, 751–52, 774–82, 782–99, 807–11, 879–81, 918–21, 946–47, 999–1001, 1034–35, 1110, 1115–17, 1143–46. Tokyo: Sanseidō.
- 2002. Seikago yaku Hokenkyō nitsuite 西夏語譯法華經について (On the Xixia version of the Lotus Sutra). Tōyō Gakujitsu Kenkyū 41, no. 2:172-62.
- 2002. Seikago kenkyū no shinryōiki 西夏語研究の新領域 (New developments in the study of the Hsi-hsia Language). Tōhōgaku 104:1-20.
- 2002: Xixiayu wenfa xinkao 西夏語文法新考 (A new approach to Xixia grammar). Guojia Tushuguan Xuekan國家圖書館學刊 (Journal of the National Library of China), Xixia yanjiu zhuanmenhao 西夏研究専門號: 123–26.
- 2003. Kan-Zō gengogaku zakkō 漢藏言語學雑考 (Thoughts on the study of Sino-Tibetan linguistics). Ekusu Oriente えくす・おりえんて (Ex Oriente) 8:267-87. Ōsaka Gaikokugo Daigaku Shakai Gengo Gakka 大阪外國語大學社會言語學會 (The Association for Integrated Studies in Language and Society, Osaka University of Foreign Studies).
- 2004. Seikago yaku 64 ke to shinkyūsho 西夏語譯六十四卦と鍼灸書 (The sixty-four hexagrams and manuals on acupuncture and moxibustion in Hsi-hsia translation). In Mikasanomiya denka beiju kinen ronshū 三笠宮殿下米壽記念論集 (Collected articles and essays in honour of His Imperial Highness Prince Mikasa on the occasion of his eighty-eighth birthday), ed. Mikasanomiya Denka Beiju Kinen Ronshū Kankōkai 三笠宮殿下米壽記念論集刊行會, 557–77. Tokyo: Tōsui Shobō 刀水書房.
- 2004. On the Xixia version of the Lotus Sutra. The Journal of Oriental Studies 14:133-45.
- 2004. Xixiayu wenfa xintan 西夏語文法新探 (New approach to Xixia grammar). In Han-Xangyu Yanjiu: Gong Huangeheng xiansheng qizhi shoujing Iunwenji 漢藏語研究：龔煌城先生七秩壽慶論文集 (Studies on Sino-Tibetan languages: Papers in honor of Professor Hwang-cherng Gong on his seventieth birthday), ed. Lin Ying-chin 林英津 et al., 353–81. Taipei: Zhongyang Yanjiuyuan Yuy-anxue Yanjiusuo 中央研究院語言學研究所.
- 2004. Kanji wa dono yō ni shūi e hirogatte itta no ka: Kanjikei mojigun no seiritsu 漢字はどのように周圍へ廣がっていったか：漢字系文字群の成立 (How far did Chinese writing spread?: The formation of the hanzi script cluster). Gek-kan Gengo 33, no. 8:46-54.
- 2005. Kokushuijō shutsudo Seikago bunken nitsuite 黒水城出土西夏語文獻について (On the Xixia documents unearthed in Khara-khoto). Nihon Gakushiin Kiyō 日本學士院紀要 (Transactions of the Japan Academy) 60, no. 1:1-17.
- 2005-6. Seikago kenkyū to Hokekyō 西夏語研究と法華經 (Xixia language stud-ies and the Lotus Sutra). 4 pts. Tōyō Gakujutsu Kenkyū 44, no. 1 (2005): 208–36; 44, no. 2 (2005): 192–216; 45, no. 1 (2006): 232–72; 45, no. 2 (2006): 208–47.
- 2005-10. XIxia language studies and Lotus Sutra. 2pts. The Journal of Oriental Strudies 15 (2005): 170–99; 20 (2010): 222–51.
- 2005. Seihoku Dai 2 Minzoku Gakuin, Shanhai Koseki Shuppansha, Eikoku Kokka Toshokan hen “Eizō Kokusuijō Bunken 1” 西北第二民族學院・上海古籍出版社・英國國家圖書館編『英藏黒水城文獻○;1』(The British Library, The Second Northwest University for Nationality, Shanghai Chinese Classics Publishing House eds., Documents from Khara-Khoto in British Library, vol. 1). Tōyō Gakuhō 87, no. 3:125-33. (Review article)
- 2007. Seihoku Dai 2 Minzoku Gakuin, Shanhai Koseki Shuppansha, Eikoku Kokka Toshokan hen “Eizō Kokusuijō Bunken 2, 3, 4” 西北第二民族學院・上海古籍出版社・英國國家圖書館編『英藏黒水城文獻○;2○;3○;4』(The British Library, The Second Northwest University for Nationality, Shanghai Chinese Classics Publishing House eds., Documents from Khara-Khoto in British Library, vol. 2, 3, 4). Tōyō Gakuhō 88, no. 4:33-43. (Review article)
- 2010. Zadankai gakumon no omoide: Nishida Tatsuo hakushi wo kakonde 座談會學問の思い出：西田龍雄博士を圍んで (Dr. Nishida Tatsuo reminisces on his life dedicated to the study of Hsi-hsia language and Sino-Tibetan languages). Tōhōgaku 119:208-50. (Repr., in Seikago kenkyū shinron, 2012.)
- 2011. Seihoku Dai 2 Minzoku Gakuin, Shanhai Koseki Shuppansha, Eikoku Kokka Toshokan hen “Eizō Kokusuijō Bunken 5” 西北第二民族學院・上海古籍出版社・英國國家圖書館編『英藏黒水城文獻○;5』(The British Library, The Second Northwest University for Nationality, Shanghai Chinese Classics Publishing House eds., Documents from Khara-Khoto in British Library, vol. 5). Tōyō Gakuhō 93, no. 1:55-63. (Review article).
