= List of Tangut books =

This list of Tangut books comprises a list of manuscript and xylograph texts that are written in the extinct Tangut language and Tangut script. These texts were mostly produced within the Western Xia dynasty (1038–1227) during the 12th and 13th centuries, and include Buddhist sutras and explanatory texts, dictionaries and other philological texts, as well as translations of Chinese books and some original Tangut texts. Some Tangut texts, particularly Buddhist sutras, continued to be produced during the Yuan dynasty (1271–1368), after the fall of the Western Xia dynasty, but the Tangut language became extinct sometime during the Ming dynasty (1368–1644), and Tangut literature was only rediscovered in the early 20th century.

Most of the books listed here were discovered hidden in a stupa outside the city walls of the abandoned Western Xia fortress city of Khara-Khoto in Inner Mongolia by Pyotr Kuzmich Kozlov during his expedition of 1907–1909. A lesser number of texts (mostly fragments) were recovered from Khara-Khoto by Aurel Stein during his expedition of 1913–1916. A large number of complete and fragmentary Tangut texts have also been discovered at various sites in Inner Mongolia, Ningxia and Gansu in China during the 20th and 21st centuries.

== Buddhist texts ==
A very large number of Buddhist texts have been preserved. Yevgeny Kychanov's 1999 catalogue of Buddhist texts from Khara-Khoto held at the Institute of Oriental Manuscripts of the Russian Academy of Sciences in Saint Petersburg lists 768 entries which cover 370 separate titles.

| Image | Title | Copies | Notes |
|---|---|---|---|
| "Auspicious Tantra of All-Reaching Union: Supplementary Explanations" volume 3 folio 12 | Auspicious Tantra of All-Reaching Union 𘀄𘓄𗄊𗫡𗋈𘜼𗰜𗺓 (Chinese: 吉祥遍至口和本續; pinyin: Jíxiáng Biànzhì Kǒuhé Běnxù) | Ningxia Institute of Archaeology, Ningxia N21:001–009 (9 vols. of a xylograph edition) | Translation of a Tibetan Tantric Buddhist text and commentary. Found at Baisigou Square Pagoda, Ningxia in 1991, and thought to be the earliest extant example of a book printed using wooden movable type. |
| "Compassionate Flower Sutra" ch. 9 | Compassionate Flower Sutra 𗈁𗤻𗖰𗚩 (Chinese: 悲華經; pinyin: Bēihuá Jīng) | National Library of China B11:049 (ch. 9 of a xylograph edition) | Translation of the Compassionate Flower Sutra (Karuṇā Puṇḍarīka) [Taishō #157]. |
| | The Dragon King of the Sea (Chinese: 海龍王經; pinyin: Hǎilóngwáng Jīng) | British Library Or.12380/3621 (manuscript scroll) | Translation of the short Buddhist text, The Question asked by the Dragon King of the Sea (Sāgara Nāgarāja Paripṛcchā) [Taishō #599]. |
| folio of the "Flower Garland Sutra" | Flower Garland Sutra 𘜶𗣼𗾟𗢳𗤻𗵽𗖰𗚩 (Chinese: 大方廣佛華嚴經; pinyin: Dàfāngguǎng Fóhuáyán Jīng) | National Library of China B11:061–127 (xylograph edition) | Translation of the Flower Garland Sutra (Mahāvaipulya Buddhāvataṃsaka Sūtra). |
| part of a chrysographic manuscript of the "Golden Light Sutra" | Golden Light Sutra 𗵒𘉍𗭼𗩾𗠁𘟙𗖰𗚩 (Chinese: 金光明最勝王經; pinyin: Jīnguāngmíng Zuìshèngwáng Jīng) | National Library of China B11:024–041 (xylograph edition) | Translation of the Golden Light Sutra (Suvarṇaprabhāsa Sūtra). |
| | Great Perfection of Wisdom Sutra 𘜶𘄒𘎑𘏞𗓽𗕥𗸰𗖰𗚩 (Chinese: 大般若波羅密多經; pinyin: Dà Bōrě Bōluómìduō Jīng) | IOM Tang.334 (12 manuscript copies in various formats, including Tang.334/134) | Translation of the Great Perfection of Wisdom Sutra (Mahāprajñāpāramitā Sūtra). |
| | Nirvana Sutra 𘜶𘄒𘈬𗦺𗖰𗚩 (Chinese: 大般涅槃經; pinyin: Dàbō Nièpán Jīng) | IOM Tang.335 (8 manuscript copies in various formats, including Tang.335/2) | Translation of the Nirvana Sutra (Mahāparinirvāṇa Sūtra) [Taishō #374]. |
| "Wonderful Dharma Lotus Flower Sutra" ch. 2 | Wonderful Dharma Lotus Flower Sutra 𗤓𗹙𗤻𗑗𗖰𗚩 (Chinese: 妙法蓮華經; pinyin: Miàofǎ Liánhuá Jīng) | IOM Tang.218 (1 manuscript copy and 2 xylograph editions) | Translation of the Lotus Sutra (Saddharma Puṇḍarīka) [Taishō #262]. |
| | Thousand Names of the Buddhas of the Past Kalpa 𗋚𗦎𗡮𘆡𗑱𗡞𗢳𗦻𗖰𗚩 (Chinese: 過去莊嚴劫千佛名經; pinyin: Guòqù Zhuāngyánjié Qiānfómíng Jīng) | National Library of China B11:052 (xylograph edition) | Translation of the first part of the Three Thousand Names of the Buddhas (Past, Present, and Future) [Taishō #446]. |
| Fragment of "Thousand Names of the Buddha of the Present" from Kharakhoto | Thousand Names of the Buddhas of the Present Kalpa 𗌮𗫻𗾈𗑱𗡞𗢳𗦻𗖰𗚩 (Chinese: 現在賢劫千佛名經; pinyin: Xiànzài Xiánjié Qiānfómíng Jīng) | IOM Tang.194 (1 manuscript copy and 24 xylograph editions) National Library of China B11:047–48 (xylograph edition) | Translation of the middle part of the Three Thousand Names of the Buddhas (Past, Present, and Future) [Taishō #447]. |
| | Repentance Ritual of Great Compassion (Chinese: 慈悲道場懺罪懺法; pinyin: Cíbēi Dàocháng Chànzuì Chànfǎ) | IOM Tang.281 (1 manuscript copy and 9 xylograph editions) National Library of China B11:038–46 (xylograph edition of chs. 1 and 3–10) | Translation of the Repentance Ritual of Great Compassion [Taishō #1909]. |
| | Twenty-Five Answers Concerning the Buddhist Principles (Chinese: 佛理二十五問答; pinyin: Fólǐ Èrshíwǔ Wèndá) | IOM (xylograph edition) | 25 questions asked by Buddhist monks, and answered by the State Preceptor Tangchang. Various editions are extant, some with commentaries. One edition (#2822) was published in 1189. |
| Frontispiece for the "High King Avalokitesvara Sutra" | High King Avalokitesvara Sutra 𗣛𘟙𗯨𗙏𘝯𗖰𗚩 (Chinese: 高王觀世音經; pinyin: Gāowáng Guānshìyīn Jīng) | Palace Museum, Beijing (xylograph edition) | Latest dated printed text in Tangut, with a colophon dated the 5th or 7th year of the Ming dynasty Xuande era (1430 or 1432). |

== Dictionaries and philological works ==
| Image | Title | Copies | Notes |
|---|---|---|---|
| "Pearl in the Palm" folio 14b (found at the Northern Mogao Caves) | Pearl in the Palm 𗼇𘂜𗟲𗿳𗖵𘃎𘇂𗊏 (Chinese: 番漢合時掌中珠; pinyin: Fān-Hàn Héshí Zhǎngzhōngzhū) | IOM Tang.13 (several printings of two xylograph editions) | Bilingual Chinese-Tangut glossary with pronunciations of Chinese words in Tangut characters and pronunciations of Tangut words in Chinese characters. |
| "Sea of Characters" Level Tone folio 53 | Sea of Writing 𘝞𗗚 (Chinese: 文海; pinyin: Wénhǎi) | IOM Tang.14 and Tang.15 (xylograph edition) | Monolingual Tangut rime dictionary, comprising one volume of level tone characters, one (now lost) volume of rising tone characters, and one volume of "mixed category" characters. |
| "Precious Rhymes of the Sea of Characters" Level Tone folio 8b | Precious Rhymes of the Sea of Characters 𘝞𗗚𘏨𗖵 (Chinese: 文海寶韻; pinyin: Wénhǎi Bǎoyùn) | IOM (manuscript copy) | Manuscript copy of an edition of the Sea of Characters rime dictionary (different from the printed edition). |
| "Homophones" Edition B folio 3 | Homophones 𗙏𘙰 (Chinese: 同音; pinyin: Tóngyīn) | IOM Tang.18 (several printings of 2 xylograph editions) | Phonological text that lists Tangut characters that are homophones of each other. |
| Fragment of the "Combined Edition of Homophones and Sea of Characters" held at the British Library | Combined Edition of Homophones and Sea of Characters (Chinese: 同音文海寶韻合編; pinyin: Tóngyīn Wénhǎi Bǎoyùn Hébiān) | IOM (manuscript copies) British Library Or.12380/2484, Or.12380/3907, Or.12380/3908 (manuscript fragments) | Combined edition of the Homophones and the Sea of Characters. |
| "Synonyms" fragment from a woodblock edition | Synonyms 𗧘𘙰 (Chinese: 同義; pinyin: Tóngyì) | IOM Tang.24 (one nearly complete manuscript copy and one partial manuscript copy); Ningxia Institute of Archaeology, Ningxia K2:157, K2:286 (two fragments of a woodblock printed edition) | List of Tangut words ordered according to synonym groups. |
| "Homonyms" folio 4 | Essential Selection of Often Transmitted Homonyms and Mixed Characters 𘄴𘏲𗏹𘈧𗦻𘙰𗏇𘉅 (Chinese: 擇要常傳同名雜字; pinyin: Zéyào Chángchuán Tóngmíng Zázì) | Private ownership | List of Tangut characters ordered according to homonym groups. |
| "Joined Rimes of the Five Sounds" Edition A pages 5b and 6a | Joined Rimes of the Five Sounds 𗏁𗙏𘈖𗖵 (Chinese: 五音切韻; pinyin: Wǔyīn Qièyùn) | IOM Tang.22 (5 manuscript copies) | Phonological text that gives tables of fanqie pronunciations for Tangut characters. |
| "Assorted Characters" folio 9a | Assorted Characters 𗏇𘉅 (Chinese: 雜字; pinyin: Zázì) | IOM Tang.19 (xylograph edition) | Classified lists of Tangut words. |
| "Golden Guide" (IOM No. 741) folio 1 | Newly Collected Grains of Gold or Golden Guide 𗵒𗭧𘃎𘐏𘝞 (Chinese: 碎金置掌文; pinyin: Suìjīn Zhìzhǎngwén) | IOM Tang.30 (manuscript copy) British Library Or.12380/2581 (manuscript fragment) | Poem comprising 200 five-character lines, in total 1,000 Tangut characters, each used a single time only; intended for use as a primer for teaching Tangut characters, in the same way that the Thousand Character Classic (千字文) was used to teach Chinese characters. |

== Original Tangut texts ==
| Image | Title | Copies | Notes |
|---|---|---|---|
| Folio from an edition of the "The Sea of Meanings, Established by the Saints" | The Sea of Meanings, Established by the Saints 𗼃𗰱𗧘𗗚 (Chinese: 聖立義海; pinyin: Shènglì Yìhǎi) | IOM Tang.32 (xylograph edition) | A leishu encyclopaedic book in 15 vols., with topics arranged by category (1182 ed.). |
| Folio from an edition of the "Revised and Newly Endorsed Law Code for the Celestial Prosperity Era" | Revised and Newly Endorsed Law Code for the Celestial Prosperity Era 𘓺𘃸𗫿𗓆𗆧𗅆𗬩𘞂 (Chinese: 天盛改舊新定律令; pinyin: Tiānshèng Gǎijiù Xīndìng Lǜlìng) | IOM Tang.55 (xylograph edition) | The Western Xia law codes as established during the Celestial Prosperity era (1149–1169), in 20 vols. |
| "Ode on Monthly Pleasures" folio 4 | Ode 𗋰𗊱 (Chinese: 賦詩; pinyin: Fù Shī) Great Ode 𗊱𗿒 (Chinese: 大詩; pinyin: Dà Shī); Ode on Monthly Pleasures 𗼑𗼑𗫉𗊱 (Chinese: 月月樂詩; pinyin: Yuèyuèlè Shī); Ode on Reason 𘋥𘝿𗊱 (Chinese: 道理詩; pinyin: Dàolǐ Shī); Ode on Cleverness 𘄦𘍵𗊱 (Chinese: 聰穎詩; pinyin: Cōngyǐng Shī) | IOM Tang.25 (xylograph edition) | A collection of five poems written in ritual Tangut language. Ode on Monthly Pleasures was printed in 1185. |
| "Newly Assembled Precious Dual Maxims" folio 2 | Newly Assembled Precious Dual Maxims 𗆧𗰖𗬻𘜼𘋥𘝿 (Chinese: 新集錦合辭; pinyin: Xīnjí Jǐnhécí) | IOM Tang.35 (xylograph edition) | Collection of Tangut two-part proverbs, published in 1187. |

== Translations of Chinese texts ==
| Image | Title | Copies | Notes |
|---|---|---|---|
| "The General's Garden" Section 37 | The General's Garden 𘒏𗩈𗛝𘊳𗺉 (Chinese: 將苑; pinyin: Jiàng Yuàn) | British Library Or.12380/1840 (manuscript scroll) | Translation of a Chinese military text, The General's Garden ascribed to Zhuge Liang. |
| | The Art of War (Chinese: 孫子兵法; pinyin: Sūnzǐ Bīngfǎ) | IOM Tang.6 (xylograph edition) | Translation of a Chinese military text, The Art of War ascribed to Sun Tzu. |
| | Newly Collected Biographies of Affection and Filial Piety 𗆧𗰖𗕿𘓓𘐆 (Chinese: 新集慈孝傳; pinyin: Zīnjí Cíxiào Zhuàn) | IOM Tang.31 (xylograph edition) | By Cao Daole. Translation of biographies of virtuous people from history (44 in the extant 2nd volume), mostly derived from Family Models 家范 by Sima Guang (1019–1086). |
| Folio from an edition of the "The Forest of Categories" | The Forest of Categories 𗴮𘊳 (Chinese: 類林; pinyin: Lèilín) | IOM Tang.11 (xylograph edition) | An encyclopaedic collection of stories (1181 edition). |
| "Analects" ch. 6 folio 2b | Analects 𘓆𘒣 (Chinese: 論語; pinyin: Lún Yǔ) | IOM Tang.2 (chs. 5, 11, 15, 19 and 20 of a xylograph edition) | Translation of the Analects of Confucius, with commentary. |
| "Mencius" folio 1a | Mencius 𗪨𘕘 (Chinese: 孟子; pinyin: Mèngzǐ) | IOM Tang.3 (part of a manuscript copy) IOM Tang.4 (part of a manuscript copy) | Translation of the Mencius, one edition with commentary. |
| "Classic of Filial Piety" folio 1a | Newly Translated Book of Filial Piety with Commentary 𗫸𗯝𘓓𘆚𘈧 (Chinese: 重譯孝經傳; pinyin: Chóngyì Xiàojīng Zhuàn) | IOM Tang.1 (manuscript copy) | Translation of the Confucian text, Classic of Filial Piety, with commentary. |

== See also ==
- Tangutology
- Cloud Platform at Juyongguan — 14th-century arch inscribed with Buddhist texts inscribed in Tangut and other languages
- Stele of Sulaiman — a 1348 stele at the Mogao Caves with the Buddhist mantra Om mani padme hum inscribed in Tangut and other languages
- Tangut dharani pillars — two dharani pillars inscribed with text of a dhāraṇī-sutra in Tangut script, dated 1502
