= Yongning Temple Stele =

Ming Dynasty stele

Coordinates: 52.94°N 139.76°E

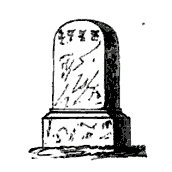
View of the 1413 Yongning Temple Stele, from The Russians on the Amur (1861) by Ernst Georg Ravenstein (1834–1913).

The Yongning Temple Stele (Chinese: 永寧寺碑, Russian: Тырская стела) is a stele erected by the Chinese Ming dynasty in 1413 with a trilingual inscription to commemorate the founding of the Yongning Temple (永寧寺) in the Nurgan outpost, near the mouth of the Amur River, by the eunuch Yishiha. The location of the temple is the village of Tyr near Nikolayevsk-on-Amur in Russia. This stele is renowned both as the latest known example of a monumental inscription in the Jurchen script, and also for the inscription of the Buddhist mantra Om mani padme hum in four different scripts on its sides. A stele with a monolingual Chinese inscription, commemorating the repair of the temple by Yishiha, was erected in 1433. Both monuments are now held at the Arsenyev Museum in Vladivostok.

== Background ==
The Ming government under the Yongle Emperor (reigned 1402–1424) attempted to expand its influence in the far north and defend itself against the Mongols by setting up a system of guards and posts in the territory of the Haixi Jurchens and Jianzhou Jurchens in the Liaodong Peninsula and the area of modern Jilin province, giving official positions to the local Jurchen leaders in exchange for their allegiance. In 1409 the Nurgan Regional Military Commission, covering the region of the lower Amur River and the island of Sakhalin, was established, but this region was under the control of the 'Wild Jurchens' who made raids on Chinese outposts. In 1412, in response to these raids the Yongle Emperor commanded the eunuch Yishiha, a Haixi Jurchen by origin, to lead an expedition to pacify the region. The following year Yishiha set off with a fleet of twenty-five ships and a thousand soldiers, as well as architects and craftsmen. He sailed down the Sungari River and into the Amur River, reaching a place the Chinese called Telin 特林 (modern Tyr) where he stayed for almost a year. Near a cliff overlooking the Amur River he built a Buddhist temple named the Temple of Eternal Tranquility (Yongning Temple).

In response to the destruction of Buddhist sculptures by local shamans, Yishiha made further expeditions to the Nurgan region in the 1420s, and in 1432–1433 he made one last expedition with 50 ships and 2,000 soldiers to invest a Jurchen chief as the new Nurgan Military Commissioner. As the temple he had founded twenty years earlier had been destroyed, Yishiha built a new Yongning Temple, situated a short distance away from its predecessor, overlooking the Amur River. In 1435 the Ming government abandoned its military presence in the region, and disbanded the Nurgan Regional Military Commission.

== The 1413 Stele ==
Om mani padme hum
Chinese
Hanzi	唵嘛呢叭𡄣吽
Pinyin	ǎn má ní bā mí hōng
Jurchen
Jurchen script	Jason Glavy's Jurchen font: 嗆丵喒侠剣儂
Transliteration	am ma ni ba mi xu (Note: The Jurchen readings are taken from Jin Qizong's Dictionary of Jurchen (Beijing: Wenwu Chubanshe, 1984). The characters are nos. 474, 370, 560, 419, 641 and 385 in Wilhelm Grube's Die Sprache und Schrift der Jučen (Leipzig: Otto Harrassowitz, 1896).)
Mongolian
Mongolian	ᠣᠣᠮ ᠮᠠ᠋ ᠨᠢ ᠪᠠᠳ ᠮᠢ ᠬᠤᠩ
Transliteration	oom ma ni bad mi qung
Tibetan
Tibetan	ཨོཾ་མ་ཎི་པད་མེ་ཧཱུཾ
Transliteration	oṁ maṇi pad me hūṁ

The 1413 stele was erected at Yongning Temple to commemorate its construction by Yishiha. The stele is 179 × 83 × 42 cm in dimensions, and is inscribed on the front with an inscription in Chinese which extols the Yongle Emperor and recounts Yishiha's expedition. On the back of the stele are abbreviated versions of the Chinese inscription written in Mongolian and Jurchen. On one side of the stele, the Buddhist mantra Om mani padme hum is engraved vertically in four different scripts:

- Chinese;
- Jurchen;
- Mongolian;
- Tibetan.

This stele is the latest known example of an inscription in the Jurchen script. The earliest record of this stele was probably in book published in 1639 by a Chinese scholar called Yang Bin, but a rubbing of the actual inscription was not published until 1887 after a Qing official called Cao Tingjie made a journey along the Amur River in 1885. The stele was removed to Vladivostok Museum in 1904.

== The 1433 Stele ==
The 1433 stele was erected in commemoration of the rebuilding of the Yongning Temple by Yishiha in 1433. It has a single, monolingual Chinese inscription.

== Inscription ==
The inscription on the 1413 stele can be translated as follows:

In Memory of the Construction, by Imperial Decree, of the Yongning Temple at Nurgan, in the 11th Year of the Yongle [Reign Period] of the Ming [Dynasty]

As is known, the [essential] qualities of heaven are height and light, and therefore heaven is able to cover [all that lies beneath it]; the qualities of the earth are vastness and thickness, by virtue of which the earth is able to sustain [all that rests upon its surface]. The qualities of the sage [ruler], in turn, are [his] will and profound wisdom, and through them he is able to gladden those who are near and win over those who are far, to bestow benefactions widely and render aid to the people.

Fifty years have passed since our [Ming] dynasty unified All-under-Heaven and tranquility came to reign within it. And the numbers of all the eastern and southern barbarians who now, crossing mountains and sailing over seas, come in an unceasing stream to prostrate themselves at the foot of our throne, are beyond counting. <...>

== Gallery ==
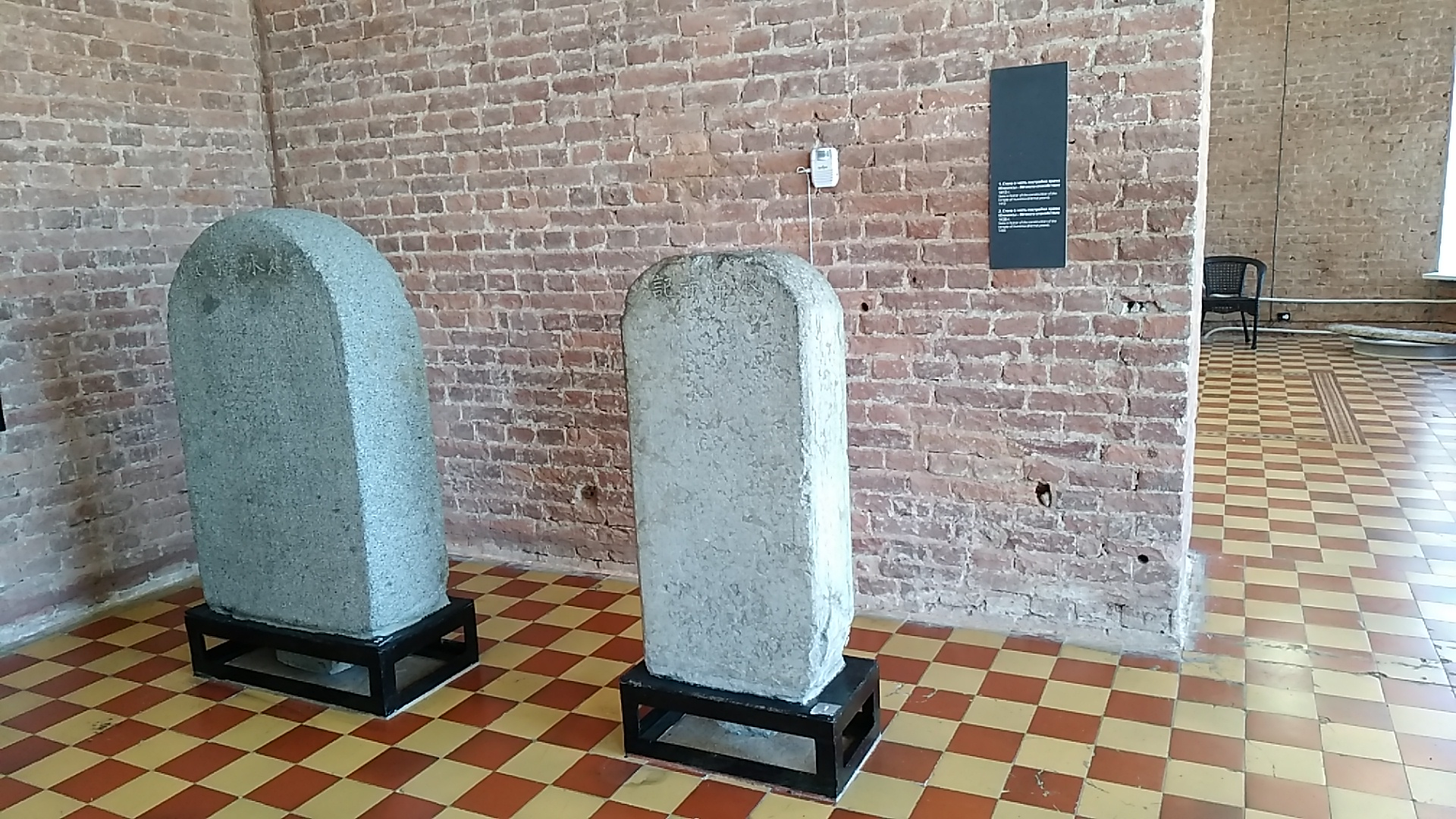

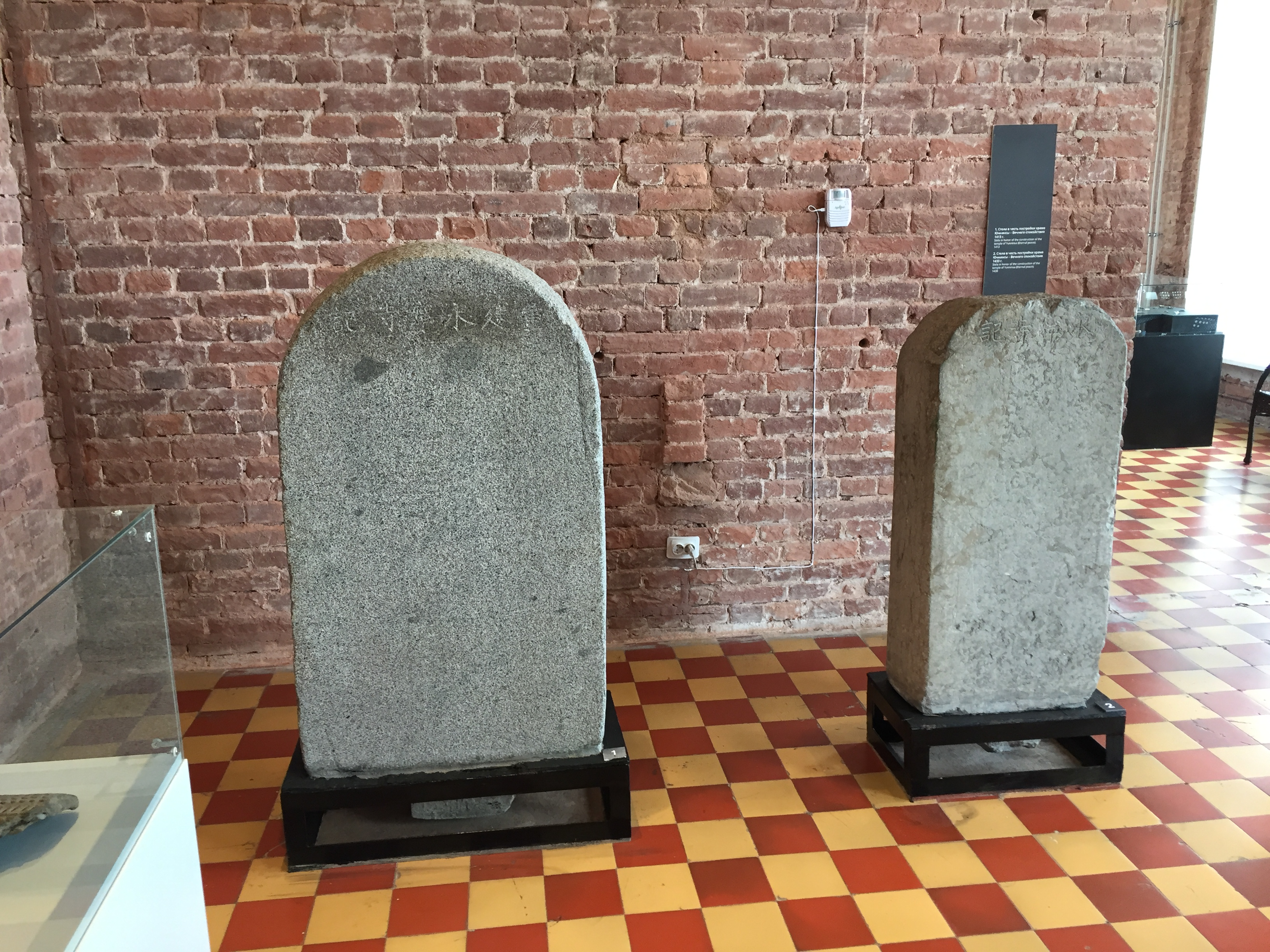

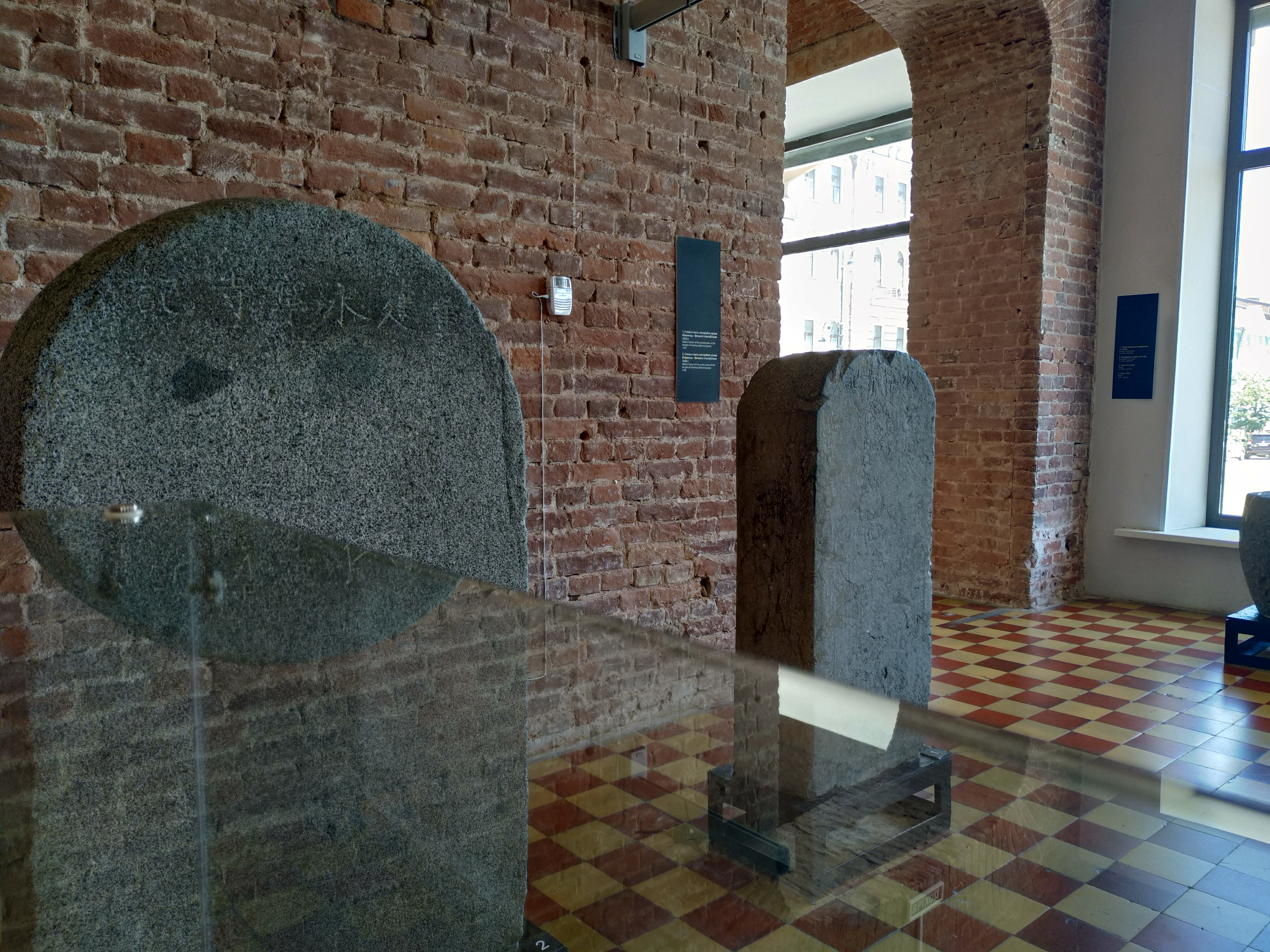

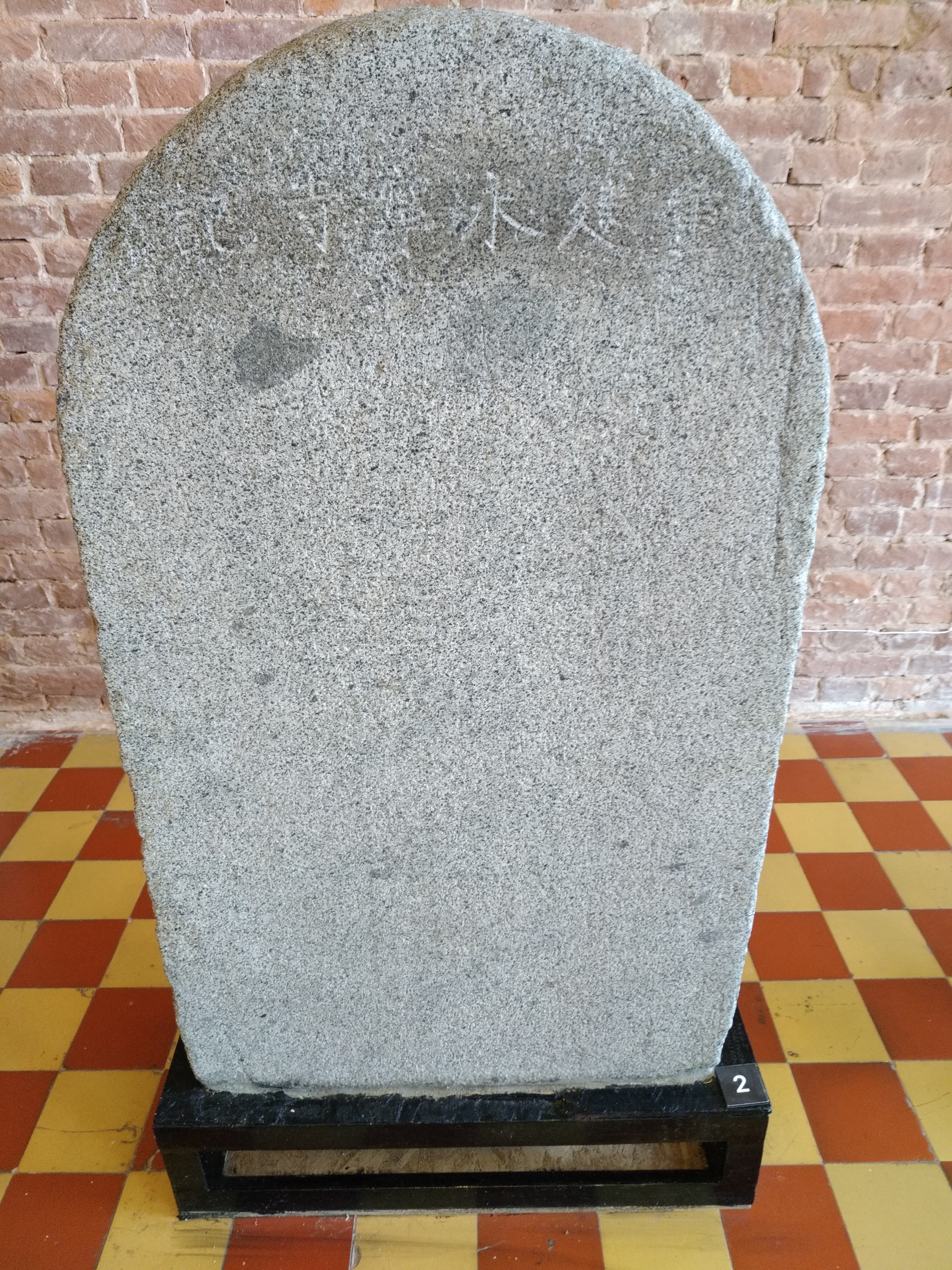

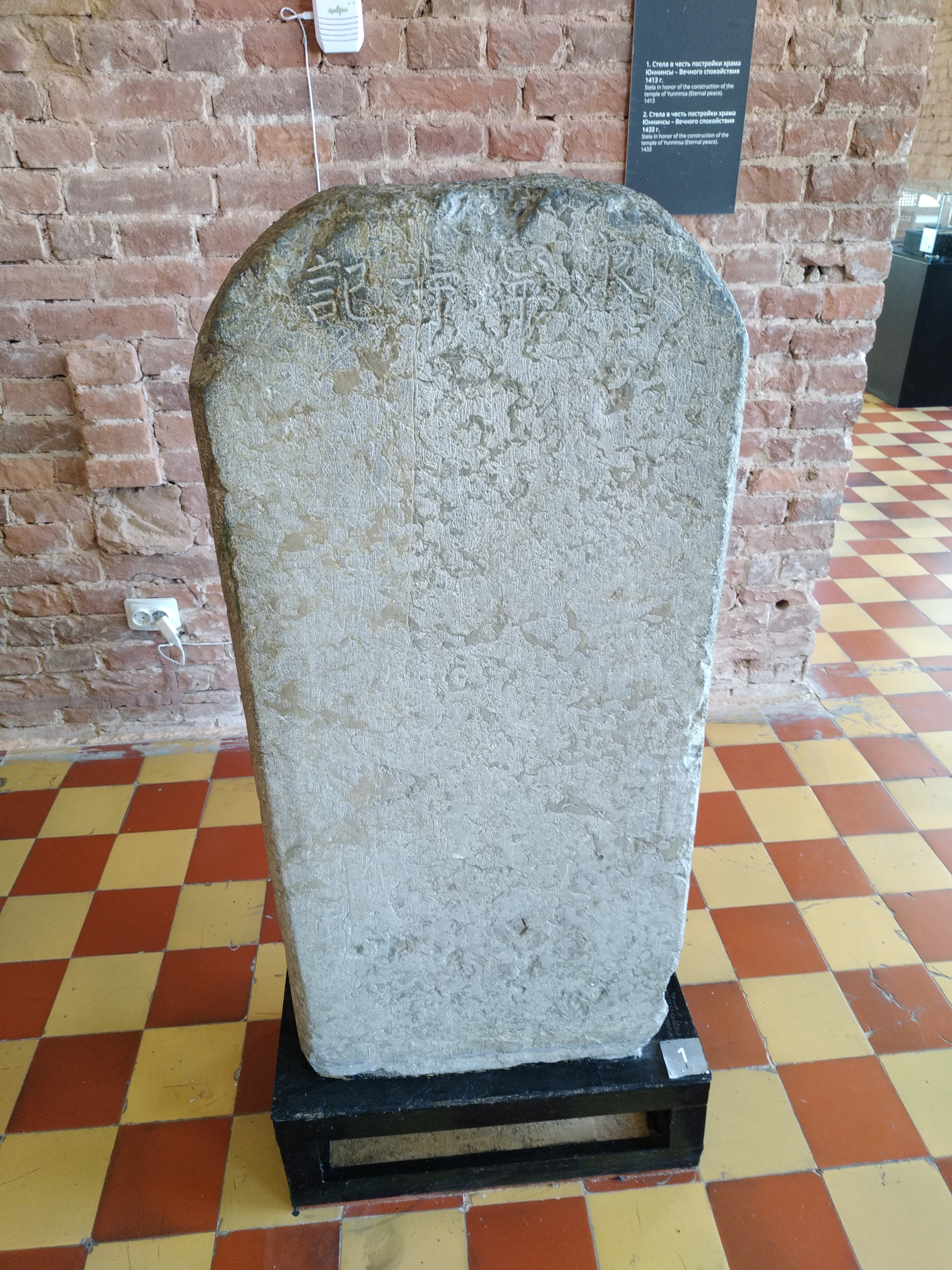

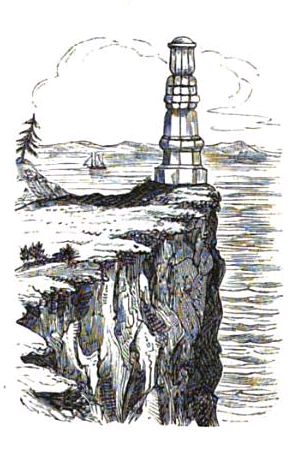

== See also ==
- Cloud Platform at Juyongguan, 1345 Buddhist structure with inscriptions in the same six scripts as the Stele of Sulaiman
- Mani stone
- Stele of Sulaiman, 1348 stele with Om mani padme hum inscribed in six scripts
- Tangut dharani pillars – two 1502 dharani pillars inscribed with the Dharani-sutra of the Victorious Buddha-Crown in Tangut script
