= Cloud Platform at Juyong Pass =

Architectural feature of the Great Wall of China

Coordinates: 40.2890°N 116.0683°E

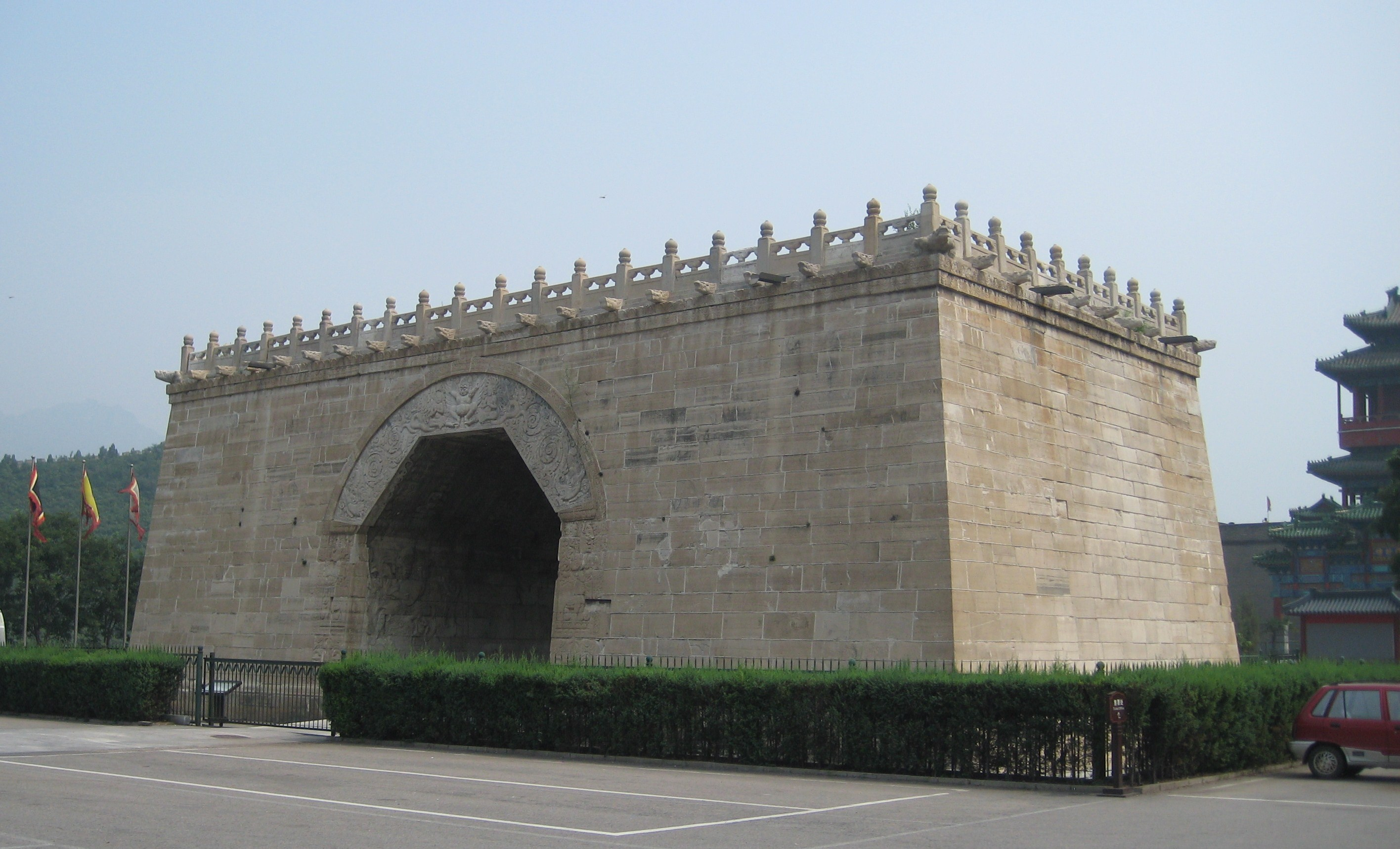
View of the Cloud Platform from the north

The Cloud Platform at Juyongguan (simplified Chinese: 居庸关云台; traditional Chinese: 居庸關雲臺; pinyin: Jūyōngguān Yúntái) is a mid-14th-century architectural feature situated in the Guangou Valley at the Juyongguan Pass of the Great Wall of China, in the Changping District of Beijing Municipality, about 60 kilometres (37 mi) northwest of central Beijing. Although the structure looks like a gateway, it was originally the base for three white dagobas or stupas, with a passage through it, a type of structure known as a "crossing street tower" (过街塔; 過街塔; Guòjiētǎ). The platform is renowned for its Buddhist carvings and for its Buddhist inscriptions in six languages. The Cloud Platform was the 98th site included in the first batch of 180 Major Historical and Cultural Sites Protected at the National Level as designated by the State Council of China in April 1961.

== History ==
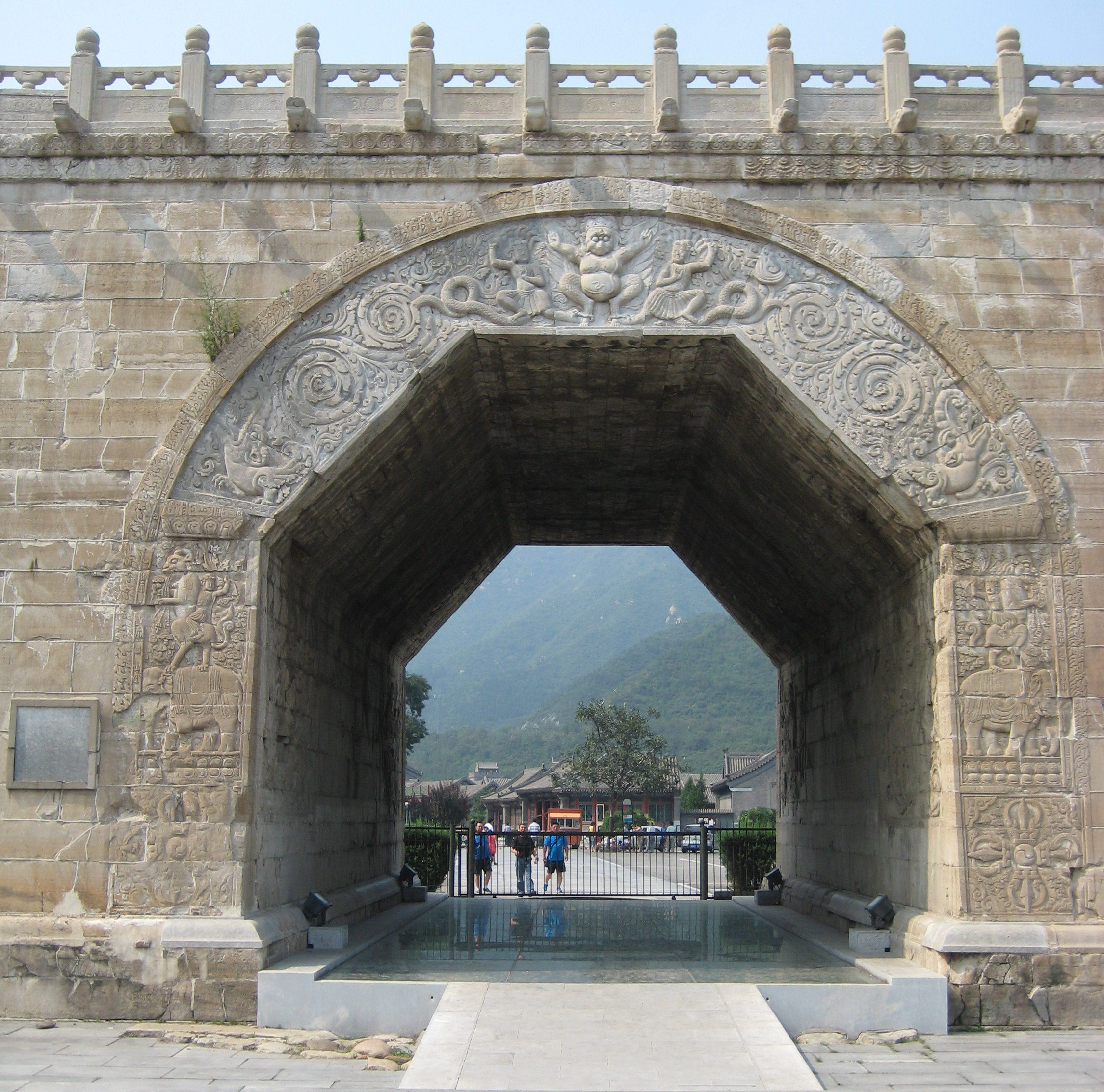
Semi-octagonal arch on the south side of the Cloud Platform

The platform was built between 1342 and 1345, during the reign of Emperor Huizong of the Yuan Dynasty, by imperial command. It was part of the Buddhist Yongming Baoxiang Temple (永明寶相寺), which was situated at the Juyongguan Pass northwest of the capital, Dadu (modern Beijing). The road from the capital to the summer capital, Shangdu, in the north went through this pass, and so the emperor would pass through the temple at least twice a year. The temple had a north gate and a south gate, and the platform supporting three white dagobas was constructed on the inside of the south gate of the temple. (Note: The Chinese term tǎ 塔 could refer to either a pagoda or a dagoba (stupa), but as the three tǎ on the Cloud Platform are referred to as being white in colour they were probably dagobas, similar in form to the Yuan dynasty white stupa at Miaoying Temple in Beijing.) The passageway underneath the dagobas was wide enough to allow pedestrians and carts to pass through into the temple.

It is recorded that in 1343 the official Ouyang Xuan (歐陽玄, 1283–1358) was paid 50 taels of silver for writing dedicatory inscriptions on two stelae to commemorate the completion of the "crossing street tower" at Juyongguan. However, the small Chinese inscription on the west wall of the platform is dated the 9th month of the 5th year of the Zhizheng era (1345), so the engravings and inscriptions must have taken two more years to complete.

The Qing Dynasty scholar Gu Yanwu (1613–1682) suggested that the construction of the Cloud Platform was begun in 1326, on the basis that the History of Yuan records that a Uyghur official called Uduman (兀都蠻) was sent to carve dharanis in the language of the western barbarians (i.e. Tibetan) on the rockface at Juyongguan. However, the inscriptions referred to here are probably not the inscriptions on the Cloud Platform, and so modern scholarship dates the construction of the Cloud Platform to 1342 or 1343.

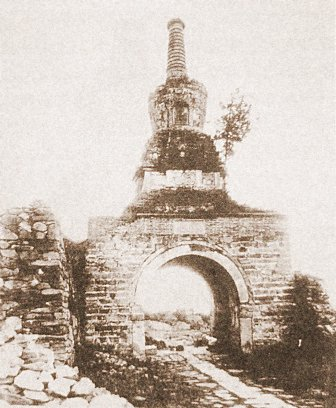
Stupa on top of an arch ("crossing street tower") that used to stand in the Fahai Temple in Beijing

By the early Ming Dynasty (1368–1644) two of the three dagobas on the platform had collapsed or had been dismantled. By the reign of the Zhengtong Emperor (1427–1464) no dagobas remained, and the structure was given the name "Cloud Platform", because from a distance it seemed to rise out of the clouds. A project to restore the platform was carried out between 1443 and 1450. When the platform was surveyed by a Japanese expedition in 1943 a stele commemorating the restoration, dated 1448, was found on top of the platform. However, the restoration was not completed until 1450, as evidenced by an inscription on the far right-hand side of the inner west wall of the platform, dated the 15th day of the 5th month of the 15th year of the Zhengtong era (1450), that records that the restoration was carried out by a benefactor named as Lin Puxian (林普賢). The restoration involved building a five-roomed wooden Buddhist hall, called the Tai'an Temple (泰安寺), on top of the platform, in place of the original dagobas.

In 1702, in the 41st year of the reign of the Kangxi Emperor there was a fire, and the Buddhist hall on top of the platform burnt down. The platform was not restored again, and by the time it was surveyed by a Japanese expedition in 1943 it was in a state of neglect and disrepair. In 1961 the platform was repaired, and the balustrades around the top were restored. The platform is now surrounded by a carpark. Several hundred meters from the Cloud Platform in adjoining carparks are sections of the Great Wall going up both sides of the Valley, often crowded with tourists climbing up to panoramic views. Most are not aware of the Cloud Platform, which is easy to miss from both the ground and the viewpoints up the mountains.

== Description ==
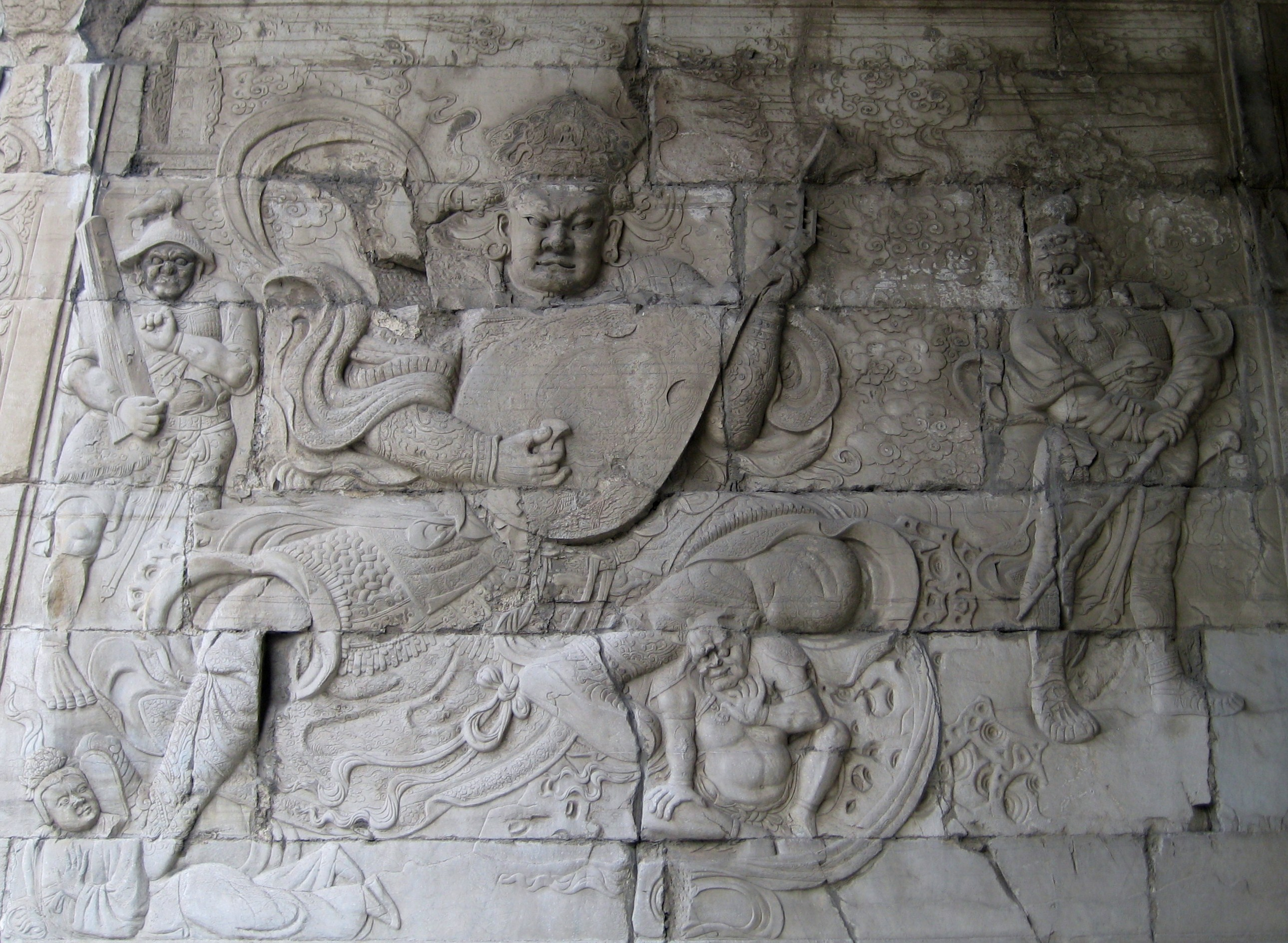
Deva King of the East on the east wall of the Cloud Platform

The Cloud Platform is a rectangular structure, with sloping walls clad in white marble. The dimensions of the structure are 28.84 m × 17.57 m (94.6 ft × 57.6 ft) at the base and 24.04 m × 14.73 m (78.9 ft × 48.3 ft) at the top, and the structure is 9.5 m (31 ft) in height. The top of the platform is surrounded by a marble balustrade, with marble dragonhead gargoyles at the base of each pillar, in total 54 small gargoyles around the edges and four large gargoyles at the corners. A passageway runs through the platform in a north–south orientation, with a semi-octagonal arch, 6.32 m (20.7 ft) wide and 7.27 m (23.9 ft) high, at either end.

The edges of the arches on both sides, and the inner walls and ceilings of the passageway are decorated with bas-relief carvings of Buddhist images, as well as inscriptions of Buddhist texts in six different scripts. The Buddhist iconography is typical of the Sakya school of Tibetan Buddhism, and was intended to bring blessings on those who passed through the passageway, and to protect the Yuan state and its capital from misfortune.

Both the north and the south arch have the same symmetrical decoration. On each side of each arch is a crossed vajra (viśvavajra), above which is an elephant surmounted by a youth riding a mythical creature. At the peak of each arch is a garuda catching a pair of half-human, half-snake nagaraja.

The ends of the inner walls are decorated with large images, 2.75 m × 3.65 m (9 ft 0 in × 12 ft 0 in), of the Four Heavenly Kings (also known as the four Deva Kings), each with various attendants, and treading on demons or ghosts:

- Deva King of the North (Sanskrit Vaiśravaṇa; Chinese: 多聞天王; pinyin: Duōwén Tiānwáng; lit. 'Heavenly King who hears everything'), holding a parasol, on the north end of the west wall
- Deva King of the South (Sanskrit Virūḍhaka; Chinese: 增長天王; pinyin: Zēngzhǎng Tiānwáng; lit. 'Heavenly King who causes to grow'), holding a sword, on the south end of the east wall
- Deva King of the East (Sanskrit Dhṛtarāṣṭra; Chinese: 持國天王; pinyin: Chíguó Tiānwáng; lit. 'Heavenly King who upholds the realm'), holding a lute, on the north end of the east wall
- Deva King of the West (Sanskrit Virūpākṣa; Chinese: 廣目天王; pinyin: Guǎngmù Tiānwáng; lit. 'Heavenly King who sees all'), holding a serpent, on the south end of the west wall

On the inner walls between the Heavenly Kings are inscriptions of the Sanskrit text of the "Dharani-Sutra of the Victorious Buddha-Crown" and the "Dharani-Sutra of the Tathagata Heart" in six different scripts, as well as translations of the "Record of Merits in the Construction of the Pagoda" in five languages, and summaries of the "Dharani-Sutra of the Tathagata Heart" in two languages (see below for details). The sloping walls of the ceiling are decorated with the Buddhas of the Ten Directions, five on each side, with the space between them taken up with small images of the Thousand Buddhas of the present kalpa. The flat ceiling at the top is decorated with five mandalas of the Five Dhyani Buddhas.

== Inscriptions ==
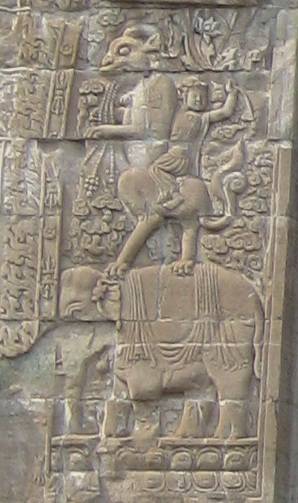
Elephant relief on the side of the south arch

The inscriptions on the inside walls of the platform are written in six different scripts:

- Lanydza script (used to write Sanskrit)
- Tibetan script (used to write the Tibetan language)
- ʼPhags-pa script (created at the command of Kublai Khan, and used to write Chinese, Mongolian and Uyghur)
- Old Uyghur script (used to write the Old Uyghur language)
- Chinese characters (used to write Chinese)
- Tangut script (used to write the Tangut language) (Note: Only the first five of these six scripts were known to 19th century scholars. Although a Chinese scholar, Zhang Shu (Chinese: 张澍; pinyin: Zhāng Shù), had correctly identified the Tangut inscription in 1804, this identification was not widely known, and in 1870 Alexander Wylie (1815–1887) mistakenly identified the inscription as being in the Jurchen script, and it was not until 1899 that Stephen Wootton Bushell (1844–1908) published a paper demonstrating conclusively that it was in fact Tangut.)

Each of these six scripts is used to transcribe the Sanskrit text of two Buddhist dharani-sutras (a type of ritual incantation) in large characters, one dharani-sutra in each script on each wall:

- Uṣṇīṣa-vijaya-dhāraṇī-sūtra (Chinese: 佛頂尊勝陀羅尼經; pinyin: Fódǐng Zūnshèng Tuóluóní Jīng; lit. 'Dharani-Sutra of the Victorious Buddha-Crown') on the east wall
- Tathāgata-hṛdaya-dhāraṇī-sūtra (Chinese: 如來心陀羅尼經; pinyin: Rúláixīn Tuóluóní Jīng; lit. 'Dharani-Sutra of the Tathagata Heart') on the west wall

In addition to the two Sanskrit dharani-sutras written in large characters in all six scripts, five of the scripts (not Lanydza) are used to write the "Record of Merits in the Construction of the Pagoda" in one of five different languages, in small characters:

- Tibetan version of the "Record of Merits" in Tibetan script
- Mongolian version of the "Record of Merits" in 'Phags-pa script
- Uyghur version of the "Record of Merits" in Old Uyghur script
- Chinese version of the "Record of Merits" in Chinese characters
- Tangut version of the "Record of Merits" in Tangut script

The Tibetan, Mongolian and Uyghur versions of the "Record of Merits" are written over both the east and west walls, whereas the Chinese and Tangut versions are complete on the east wall, and the small script Chinese and Tangut inscriptions on the west wall are explanatory summaries in the Chinese and Tangut languages of the "Dharani-Sutra of the Tathagata Heart".

=== East wall ===
The inscriptions on the east inner wall of the passageway are laid out as below:

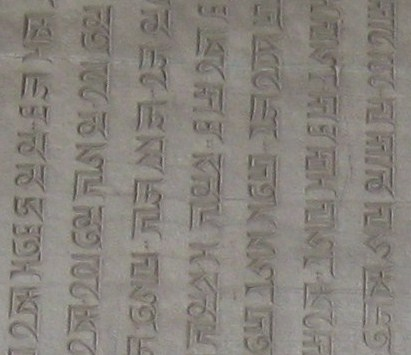
Detail of inscription in large 'Phags-pa characters

- Top panel (0.40 m high): 4 lines of horizontal Lanydza text in large characters
- Middle panel (0.55 m high):
  - 2 lines of horizontal Tibetan text in large characters (transcription of the Sanskrit "Dharani-Sutra of the Victorious Buddha-Crown")
  - 4 lines of horizontal Tibetan text in small characters (Tibetan translation of the "Record of Merits", part 1)
- Bottom panel (1.55 m high) divided into four sections (from left to right):
  - Vertical columns of 'Phags-pa text running from left to right (1.58 m wide):
    - 20 columns of vertical 'Phags-pa text in large characters (transcription of the Sanskrit "Dharani-Sutra of the Victorious Buddha-Crown")
    - 8 columns of vertical 'Phags-pa text in small characters (Mongolian translation of the "Record of Merits", part 1)
  - Vertical columns of Old Uyghur text running from left to right (1.44 m wide):
    - 20 columns of vertical Old Uyghur text in large characters (transcription of the Sanskrit "Dharani-Sutra of the Victorious Buddha-Crown")
    - 13 columns of vertical Old Uyghur text in small characters (Uyghur translation of the "Record of Merits", part 1)
  - Vertical columns of Tangut text running from right to left (1.73 m wide):
    - 27 columns of vertical Tangut text in large characters (transcription of the Sanskrit "Dharani-Sutra of the Victorious Buddha-Crown")
    - 11 columns of vertical Tangut text in small characters (Tangut translation of the "Record of Merits")
  - Vertical columns of Chinese text running from right to left (1.58 m wide):
    - 21 columns of vertical Chinese text in large characters (transcription of the Sanskrit "Dharani-Sutra of the Victorious Buddha-Crown")
    - 21 columns of vertical Chinese text in small characters (Chinese translation of the "Record of Merits")

=== West wall ===
The inscriptions on the west inner wall of the passageway are laid out as below:

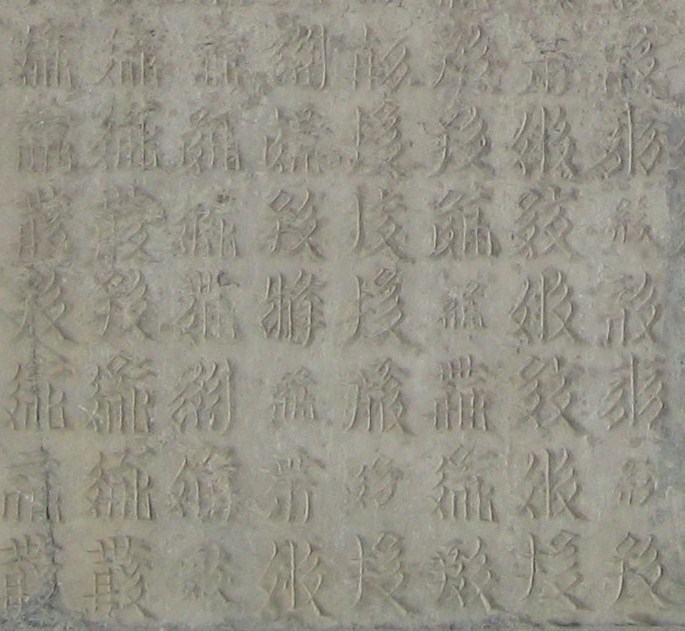
Detail of inscription in large Tangut characters

- Top panel (0.40 m high): 4 lines of horizontal Lanydza text in large characters
- Middle panel (0.55 m high):
  - 3 lines of horizontal Tibetan text in large characters (transcription of the Sanskrit "Dharani-Sutra of the Tathagata Heart")
  - 4 lines of horizontal Tibetan text in small characters (Tibetan translation of the "Record of Merits", part 2)
- Bottom panel (1.55 m high) divided into four sections (from left to right):
  - Vertical columns of 'Phags-pa text running from left to right (1.58 m wide):
    - 19 columns of vertical 'Phags-pa text in large characters (transcription of the Sanskrit "Dharani-Sutra of the Tathagata Heart")
    - 14 columns of vertical 'Phags-pa text in small characters (Mongolian translation of the "Record of Merits", part 2)
  - Vertical columns of Old Uyghur text running from left to right (1.50 m wide):
    - 20 columns of vertical Old Uyghur text in large characters (transcription of the Sanskrit "Dharani-Sutra of the Tathagata Heart")
    - 14 columns of vertical Old Uyghur text in small characters (Uyghur translation of the "Record of Merits", part 2)
  - Vertical columns of Tangut text running from right to left (1.72 m wide):
    - 26 columns of vertical Tangut text in large characters (transcription of the Sanskrit "Dharani-Sutra of the Tathagata Heart")
    - 13 columns of vertical Tangut text in small characters (summary of the "Dharani-Sutra of the Tathagata Heart" in Tangut language)
  - Vertical columns of Chinese text running from right to left (1.58 m wide):
    - 21 columns of vertical Chinese text in large characters (transcription of the Sanskrit "Dharani-Sutra of the Tathagata Heart")
    - 20 columns of vertical Chinese text in small characters (summary of the "Dharani-Sutra of the Tathagata Heart" in Chinese language)

The summary of the "Dharani-Sutra of the Tathagata Heart" in Chinese is concluded with an inscription specifying that it was written on an auspicious day of the 9th month of the 5th year of the Zhizheng era (1345) by a monk called Decheng (德成) from the Baoji Temple (寶積寺) in Chengdu. The Old Uyghur version of the "Record of Merits" is also concluded with a date, but it is now damaged, and all that can be made out is the Zhizheng era.

== See also ==
- Mani stone
- Stele of Sulaiman – a 1348 stele at the Mogao Caves with the Buddhist mantra Om mani padme hum inscribed in the same six scripts as at the Cloud platform
- Tangut dharani pillars – two 1502 dharani pillars inscribed with the Dharani-sutra of the Victorious Buddha-Crown in Tangut script
- Yongning Temple Stele, 1413 stele with Om mani padme hum inscribed in four scripts
