= Stele of Sulaiman =

Coordinates: 40.037°N 94.804°E

The Stele of Sulaiman is a Yuan dynasty stele that was erected in 1348 to commemorate the benefactors and donors to a Buddhist temple at the Mogao Caves southeast of Dunhuang in Gansu, China. The principal benefactor is named as Sulaiman (simplified Chinese: 速来蛮; traditional Chinese: 速來蠻; pinyin: Sùláimán), Prince of Xining (died 1351). The stele, which is now held at the Dunhuang Academy, is renowned for an inscription of the Buddhist mantra Om mani padme hum in six different scripts. Another stele, commemorating the restoration of the Huangqing Temple (皇庆寺; 皇慶寺; Huáng qìng sì) in 1351 by Sulaiman was found at the same location as the 1348 stele.

== Discovery ==
The two steles were first recorded by the French explorer, Charles-Eudes Bonin (1865–1929), during an expedition to western China from 1898 to 1900. When Aurel Stein visited Dunhuang in 1900–1901 he found both steles outside a shrine next to Cave 96, the home of a colossal Buddha statue, 35.5 m in height. Stein supposed that the steles originally belonged in the cave of the colossal Buddha, and that the inscription "Cave of Unequalled Height" at the top of the 1348 stele referred to this particular cave rather than the caves in general as is now the case.

== The 1348 Stele ==
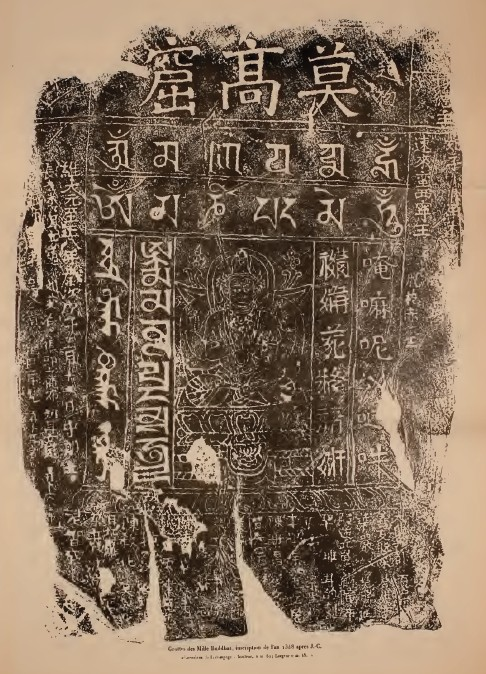

Om mani padme hum

'Ranjana script
Transliteration	auṃ maṇi pad me hūṃ

Tibetan
Tibetan	ཨོཾ་མ་ཎི་པད་མེ་ཧཱུྃ
Transliteration	oṁ maṇi pad me hūṁ

Old Uyghur
Old Uyghur alphabet	𐽰𐽳𐽹 𐽹𐽰𐽺𐽶 𐽼𐽰𐾀𐽹𐽶 𐽲𐽳𐽺𐽷
Transliteration	ʾwm mʾny pʾtmy qwnk
Transscription	Oom mani Padmi ḥung

'Phags-pa
'Phags-pa	ꡝꡡꡏ ꡏ ꡋꡞ ꡌꡊ ꡏꡠ ꡜꡟꡃ
Transliteration	'om ma ni pad me hung

Tangut
Tangut	𗙫𗏵𗐱𗴟𗘺𗦀
Transliteration	·a mja nji pja mjij xo

Chinese
Traditional Chinese	唵嘛呢叭𠺗吽
Pinyin	ǎn má ní bā mí hōng

The 1348 stele is 140.5 × 61.5 cm in size. The face of the stele has the words "Cave of Unequalled Height" (莫高窟; Mògāokū) written in large Chinese characters at the top, below which the Buddhist mantra Om mani padme hum is engraved in six different scripts around the engraved image of the four-armed Tibetan form of Avalokiteśvara, the bodhisattva of compassion, with whom this mantra is particularly associated:

- Ranjana, laid out horizontally on the first row;
- Tibetan, laid out horizontally on the second row;
- Old Uyghur, laid out vertically on the far left;
- 'Phags-pa, laid out vertically to the left of the image;
- Tangut, laid out vertically to the right of the image;
- Chinese, laid out vertically on the far right.

The layout of these scripts is very similar to the layout of the same six scripts on the inscriptions of dharani on the inner walls of the Cloud Platform at Juyongguan, carved three years earlier in 1345. However, on the Cloud Platform inscriptions the positions of 'Phags-pa and Old Uyghur are reversed.

On the left, right and bottom of the stele, surrounding the mantras, are inscriptions in smaller Chinese characters, as described:

On the righthand side is a list of principal benefactors, headed by Sulaiman and his wife, Küčü (Chinese: Qu Zhu 屈朮), and their children. Sulaiman was a fourth generation descendant of Temüge, the youngest brother of Genghis Khan, and according to the History of the Yuan dynasty he was installed as Prince of Xining (西宁王; 西寧王; Xīníng Wáng) in 1329.

On the lefthand side it is recorded that the stele was erected on the 15th day of the 5th month of the 8th year of the Zhizheng era [of Emperor Huizong of Yuan] (i.e. 1348) by the monk Shoulang 守朗.

On the far left, outside the frame, is a single line recording that the stele was engraved by a certain Shelan Lingdan (simplified Chinese: 奢蓝令旃; traditional Chinese: 奢藍令旃; pinyin: Shēlán lìngzhān;).

At the bottom is a long list of other donors, many of them with Mongolian or Tibetan names.

== The 1351 Stele ==
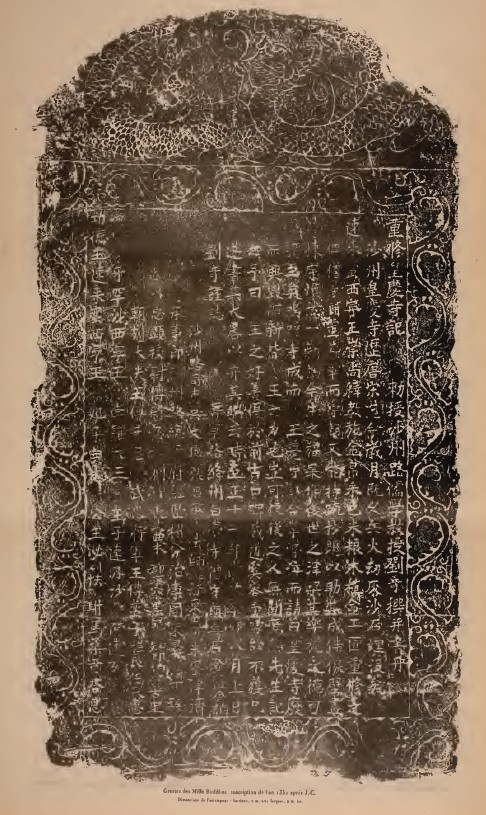
Stele commemorating the restoration of the Huangqing Temple in 1351.

The 1351 stele was erected to commemorate the restoration of the Huangqing Temple by Sulaiman and other benefactors. The inscription text, composed by Liu Qi (simplified Chinese: 刘奇; traditional Chinese: 劉奇; pinyin: Liú Qí), Director of Literary Studies of the Shazhou District, in the 8th month of the 11th year of the Zhizheng era (i.e. 1351) states that Sulaiman donated gold, silk, timber and other provisions for the temple's reconstruction, and that the monk Shoulang, who erected the 1348 stele, was responsible for keeping a register of donors. The inscription also notes that Sulaiman died when the restoration was completed, and so the principal benefactor listed at the end of the inscription is Sulaiman's son, Yaɣan-Šāh (Chinese: 牙罕沙; pinyin: Yá hǎn shā), the new Prince of Xining.

== See also ==
- Cloud Platform at Juyongguan, 1345 Buddhist structure with inscriptions in the same six scripts as the Stele of Sulaiman
- Mani stone
- Tangut dharani pillars – two 1502 dharani pillars inscribed with the Dharani-sutra of the Victorious Buddha-Crown in Tangut script
- Yongning Temple Stele, 1413 stele with Om mani padme hum inscribed in four scripts
