= Juyong Pass =

Mountain pass in Changping District, Beijing, China

Juyong Guan
- 居庸关
- Chuyungkwan
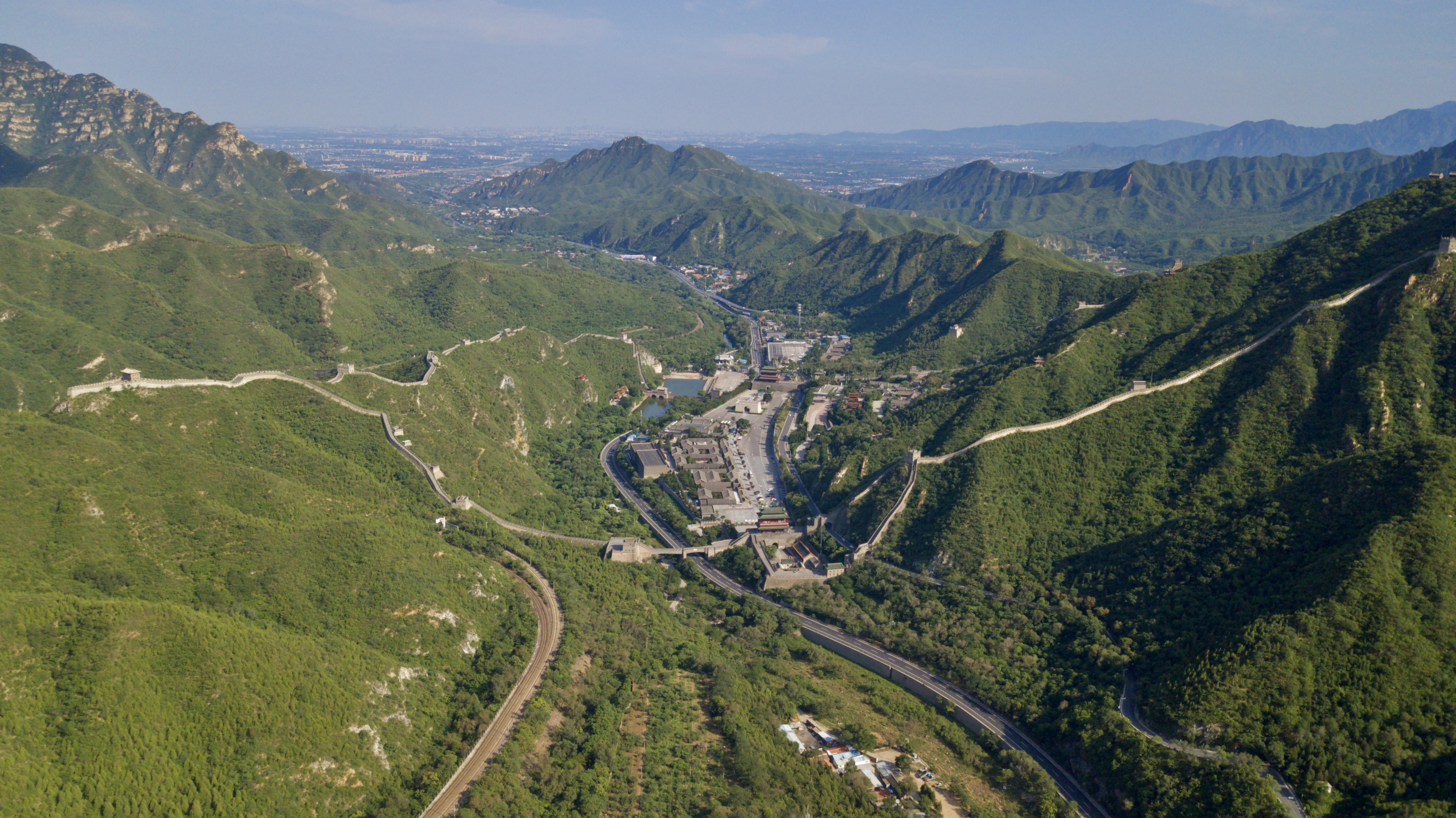
- Aerial view of Juyong Pass

- Location within China
- Traversed by: G6, G110

Location
- Location: Changping District, Beijing, China
- Coordinates: 40.2882°N 116.0686°E

Chinese name
- Simplified Chinese: 居庸关
- Traditional Chinese: 居庸關
- Postal: Chuyungkwan
Transcriptions
Standard Mandarin
- Hanyu Pinyin: Jūyōng guān
- Wade–Giles: Chü^{1}-yung^{1} kuan^{1}
- IPA: [tɕý.jʊ́ŋ kwán]
Yue: Cantonese
- Yale Romanization: Gēui-yùhng gwāan
- Jyutping: Geoi1-jung4 gwaan1
Southern Min
- Tâi-lô: Ki-iông kuan (col.); Ku-iông kuan (lit.)

Juyong Pass (Chinese: 居庸关; pinyin: Jūyōng guān) is a mountain pass located in the Changping District of Beijing Municipality, over 50 kilometers (31 mi) northwest of central Beijing. The Great Wall of China passes through, and the Cloud Platform was built here in the year 1342.

== Mountain pass ==
=== Geography ===
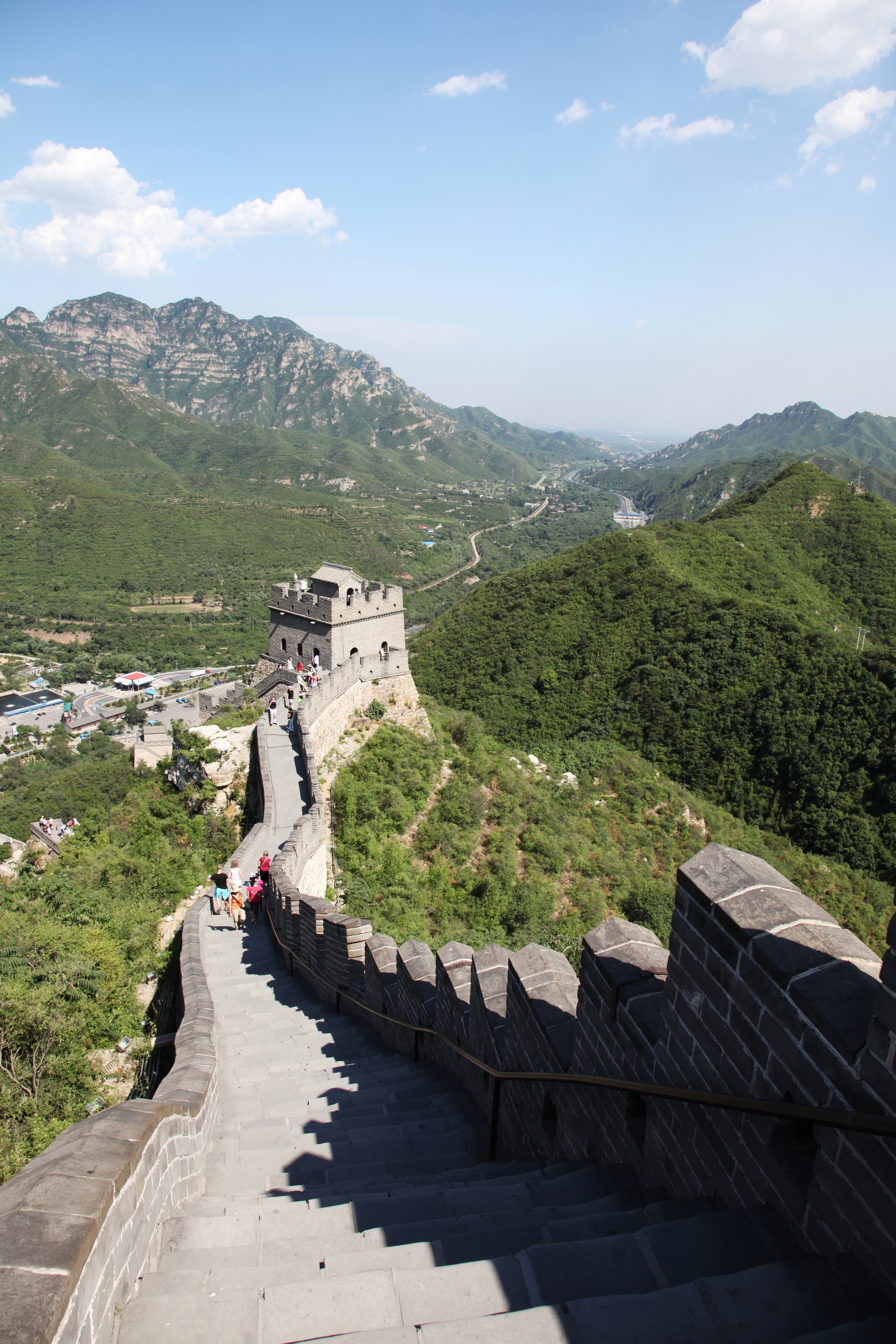
View of the Great Wall at Juyong Pass

Juyong Pass is in the 18-kilometer (11 mi)-long Guangou Valley. During the Ming dynasty restoration and expansion of the Great Wall of China, it was one of the "Three Inner Passes" (t 内三關, s 内三关, Nèisānguān) from Mongolia to Beijing, along with Daoma Pass and Zijing Pass. Juyong Pass has two 'sub-passes', one at the valley's south and the other in the north. The southern one is called "Nan (pass)" and the northern one "Badaling".

=== History ===
The name Jūyōng guān was first used in the Qin dynasty, when Emperor Qin Shi Huang ordered the building of the Great Wall. Juyong Pass was connected to the wall in the Northern and Southern dynasties era.

The present pass route was built in the Ming dynasty and received much renovation later. It was a strategic location connecting the inner lands and the northern borders of the nation.

== Cloud Platform ==
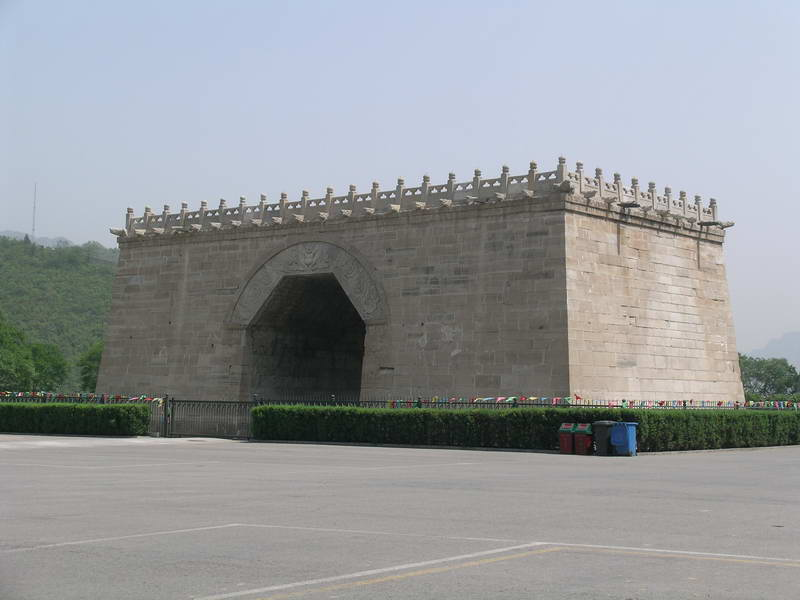
Cloud Platform at Juyong Pass

=== History ===
In the middle of Juyong Pass and the Guangou Valley is located the "Cloud Platform" gate, also known as the "Crossing Street Tower". It was built in 1342, during the Yuan dynasty, and is made of white marble with a height of 9.5 metres (31 ft). There were originally three white pagodas atop the platform. They were each destroyed in the transitional period between the late Yuan and early Ming dynasties. During the early Ming dynasty, a Buddhist temple hall was built on the platform. It was destroyed in 1702, during the Qing dynasty.

== See also ==
- Juyongguan railway station
- Operation Chahar
- Chinese architecture
