= Tangut dharani pillars =

Pillars with Buddhist holy text inscribed in the extinct Tangut script

Coordinates: 38.8573°N 115.4930°E

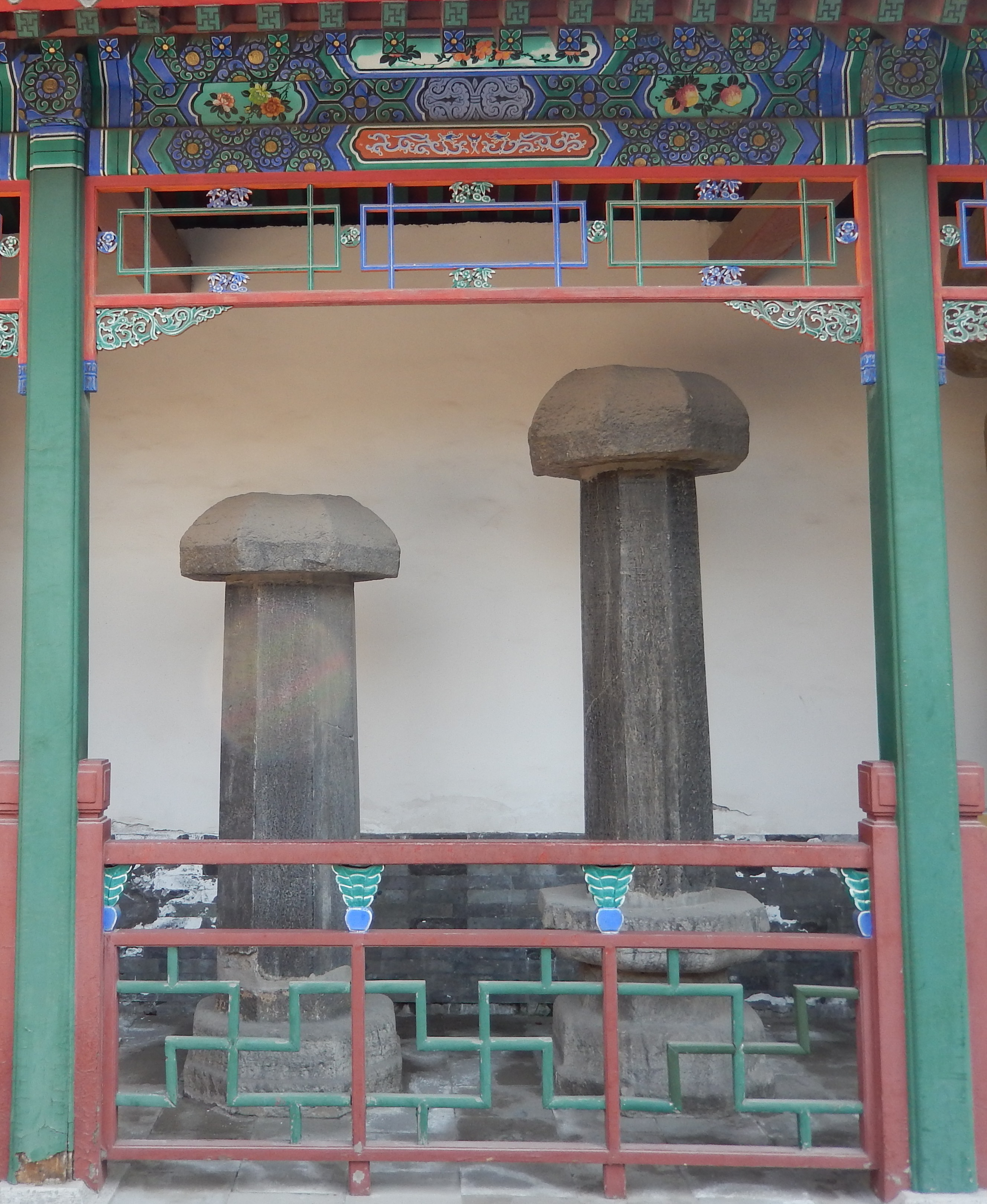
Tangut dharani pillars on display at the Ancient Lotus Pond in Baoding (Pillar A on the left, Pillar B on the right).

The Tangut dharani pillars (Chinese: 西夏文石幢; pinyin: Xīxiàwén shíchuáng) are two stone dharani pillars, with the text of a dhāraṇī-sutra inscribed on them in the Tangut script, which were found in Baoding, Hebei, China in 1962. The dharani pillars were erected during the middle of the Ming dynasty, in 1502, and they are the latest known examples of the use of the Tangut script. They are also very rare examples of Tangut monumental inscriptions outside of the territories ruled by the Western Xia dynasty. The only other known example of an inscription in the Tangut script that has been found in north China is on the 14th-century Cloud Platform at Juyongguan in Beijing. These pillars indicate that there was a vibrant Tangut community living in Baoding, far from the Tangut homeland in modern Ningxia and Gansu, during the early 16th century, nearly 300 years after the Western Xia was annihilated by the Mongol Empire.

== History ==
The two pillars were discovered in 1962 in the village of Hanzhuang (韓莊) in the northern suburbs of the city of Baoding, in Hebei province, 140 kilometres (87 mi) south-west of Beijing.

After receiving information from the Hebei Nationalities Affairs Committee, the Cultural Relics Working Group of the Hebei Bureau of Cultural Affairs sent a team to investigate and excavate a site at Hanzhuang, on the south side of the road leading into the village from the west. The site was a square platform (150m × 150m), about 2m above the surrounding ground, on which was scattered broken pieces of tiles and bricks dating to the Ming and Qing dynasties. According to elderly inhabitants of the village, the platform was the site of a temple, locally known as the "Big Temple" (大寺) or the "West Temple" (西寺) or the "Pagoda Temple" (塔寺). Some of the temple buildings were still standing during the latter years of the Qing Dynasty (1644–1911), but all the remaining buildings were destroyed during the first half of the 20th century. The distinctive feature of the temple was a Tibetan-style stupa-shaped white pagoda, similar to the Yuan Dynasty white dagoba at Miaoying Temple in Beijing. The two Tangut dharani pillars were discovered on the site of the temple.

The name of the temple where the pillars were found is given in the Tangut inscription, and has been transcribed into Chinese as Xishi Temple (稀什寺), but according to Shi Jinbo and Bai Bin the Tangut transcription probably represents the Chinese name Xingshan Temple (興善寺), meaning "Temple for Promoting Goodness". A temple of this name is recorded as having been established in Baoding during the Yuan Dynasty, and as the name of the monks associated with the temple are Tibetan, the temple must have been a Tibetan lamasery. The white Tibetan-style dagoba originally located at the site of the dharani pillars helps confirm the identification of Xishi Temple as Xingshan Temple. As the Tangut people followed the Tibetan school of Buddhism, it would be natural for Tangut monks to live in a Tibetan lamasery.

After their discovery, the two pillars were moved to the Ancient Lotus Pond (古莲花池) in the centre of Baoding. As of 2013 they are standing in a courtyard near the main entrance to the Ancient Lotus Pond, among other historic monumental inscriptions.

== Description ==
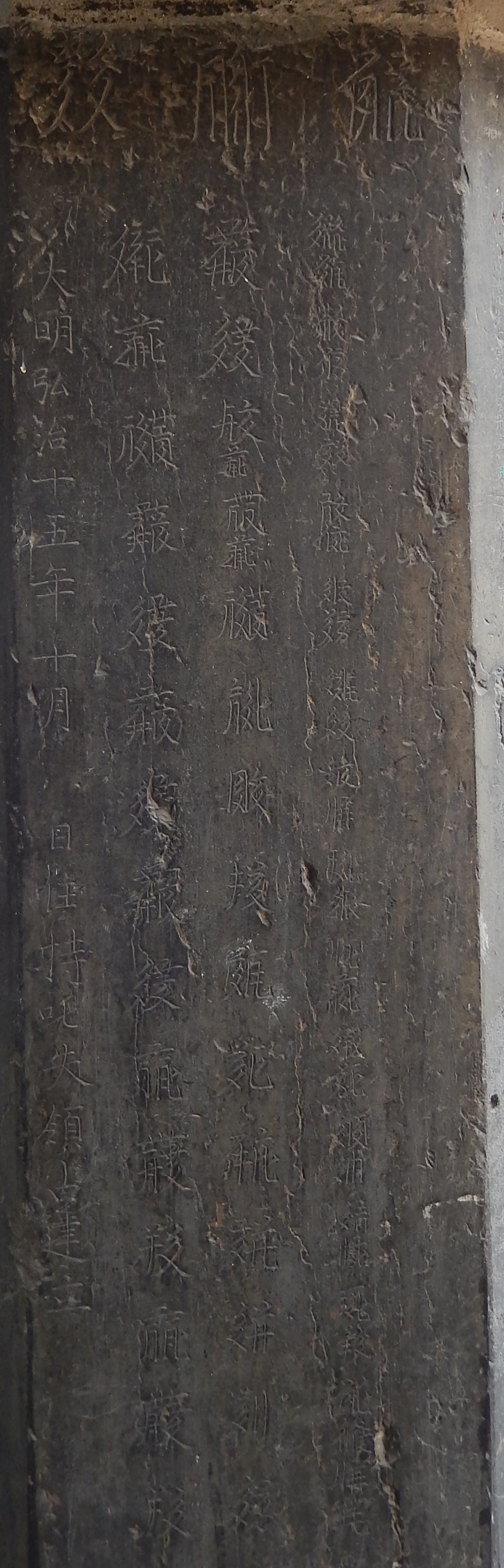
Detail of one face of Pillar A, showing the Tangut title and part of the dharani text, as well as a date in Chinese corresponding to 1502.

Both pillars are octagonal in form, and have a base and a mushroom-shaped canopy. Pillar A is 2.28 metres (7.5 ft) high and Pillar B is 2.63 metres (8.6 ft) high. The two pillars are engraved with Tangut text on most of their sides (983 characters on 6 out of 8 sides on Pillar A, and 1,029 characters on 5 out of 8 sides on Pillar B), and there is a single line of Chinese text on one of the pillars (Pillar A). There are no relief sculptures or engraved decoration on either pillars.

== Inscriptions ==
Both pillars have a horizontal title in three Tangut characters (𘍦𗠁𘞃), meaning "Pillar of Victory Sign" (Chinese: 相勝幢; pinyin: Xiāngshèng Chuáng or Chinese: 勝相幢; pinyin: Shèngxiāng Chuáng) at the top of the first face. As the Buddha crown (a fleshy protuberance on the crown of the head) is the 32nd of the 32 signs of Buddha, Bai Bin has suggested that the title is shorthand for "Pillar of the Victorious Buddha-Crown [Dharani-Sutra]".

The first column of Tangut text on the first face of Pillar A explains that it was erected in the 15th year of the Hongzhi era (1502) by the abbot Phesho Chashirerje' 𗦮𗊻𗲁𗫍𗣀𗫻 (平尚吒失領占) in memory of the novice monk Pada Donje 𗴟𘃕𗹏𗘦 (巴答那征), who died on the 24th day of the 4th month of the 14th year of the Hongzhi era (1501).

The first column of Tangut text on the first face of Pillar B explains that it was erected by the abbot on the 20th day of the 9th month of the 15th year of the Hongzhi era (1502), in memory of an unnamed "Master Monk" who died on the 6th day of the 2nd month of the same year. Pillar B also has a single line of Chinese text which states that it was erected in the 10th month of the 15th year of the Hongzhi era (1502) by the abbot Zhashi Lingzhan (吒失領占). The abbot's name is a transcription of the Tibetan name Trashi Rinchen བཀྲ་ཤིས་རིན་ཅན་ meaning "Auspicious Precious".

The main body of the Tangut text engraved on the 1st through 7th faces of both pillars comprises the Dharani-Sutra of the Victorious Buddha-Crown (Chinese: 佛頂尊勝陀羅尼經; pinyin: Fódǐng zūnshèng tuóluóní jīng; Sanskrit: Uṣṇīṣa-vijaya-dhāraṇī-sūtra), a text that is particularly associated with the transmigration of the souls of the dead. The Tangut text of this dharani-sutra is also found on the east wall of the Cloud Platform at Juyongguan in Beijing, where it is separately transcribed in the Lanydza, Tibetan, 'Phags-pa, Old Uyghur, Chinese, and Tangut scripts. The Cloud Platform Buddhist inscriptions were made during the late Yuan Dynasty, in 1345, more than 150 years before the Baoding pillars were erected. As yet the full text of the inscriptions on the Baoding pillars has not been published, and the relationship between the Baoding version of the text and the Juyongguan version of the text is uncertain.

On the 8th face of both pillars is a long list of the names of benefactors who donated money for the erection of the pillars. In total the names of more than eighty donors are listed, with no name being repeated on both pillars, suggesting that the money to erect the two pillars was collected at the same time.

== See also ==
- Cloud Platform at Juyongguan, 1345 Buddhist structure with inscriptions in the same six scripts as the Stele of Sulaiman
- Mani stone
- Stele of Sulaiman, a 1348 stele with Om mani padme hum inscribed in six scripts, including Tangut
- Yongning Temple Stele, 1413 stele with Om mani padme hum inscribed in four scripts
