= Dharani pillar =

Buddhist pillars engraved with dharani sutras

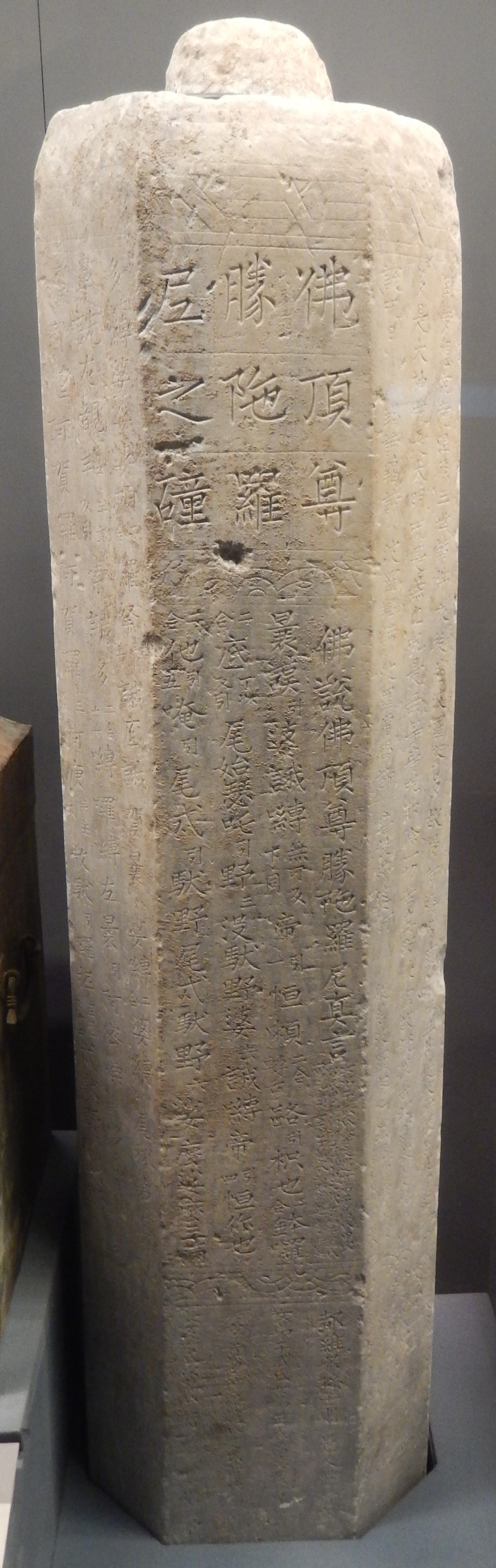
Ming dynasty octagonal dharani pillar, engraved with the Dharani of the Victorious Buddha-Crown, originally standing at the Temple of Azure Clouds (碧雲寺) in Beijing.

A dharani pillar (Chinese: 陀羅尼幢; pinyin: tuóluóní chuáng), sutra pillar, or jingchuang (Chinese: 經幢; pinyin: jīngchuáng) is a type of stone pillar engraved with dhāraṇī-sūtras or simple dhāraṇī incantations that is found in China. Dharani pillars were usually erected outside Buddhist temples, and became popular during the Tang dynasty (618–907).

== History ==
The earliest surviving Dharani pillars date to the Tang dynasty, and they became very popular during the mid-Tang. One of the first recorded mentions of their existence was by the Japanese monk Ennin who visited China from 838 to 847.

Qian Liu (852–932), founder of the Wuyue kingdom (907–978) during the Five Dynasties and Ten Kingdoms period, is recorded as having erected several dharani pillars during his reign, as an act of devotion: one at the Zhaoxian Temple (招賢寺) in 911, two at the Daqian Temple (大錢寺) in 911, one at the Tianzhu Riguan Hermitage (天竺日觀庵) in 913, and two at the Haihui Temple (海會寺) in 924.

A distinctive style of dharani pillar developed in the far south of China, in modern Yunnan, within the non-Chinese kingdoms of Nanzhao (737–902) and Dali (937–1253). The Yunnanese dharani pillars are elaborately sculpted with Buddhist figures, and are very different in style to the dharani pillars of the Tang and Song dynasties to the north.

Dharani pillars continued to be erected through the Ming dynasty (1368–1644).

== Description ==
=== Form ===
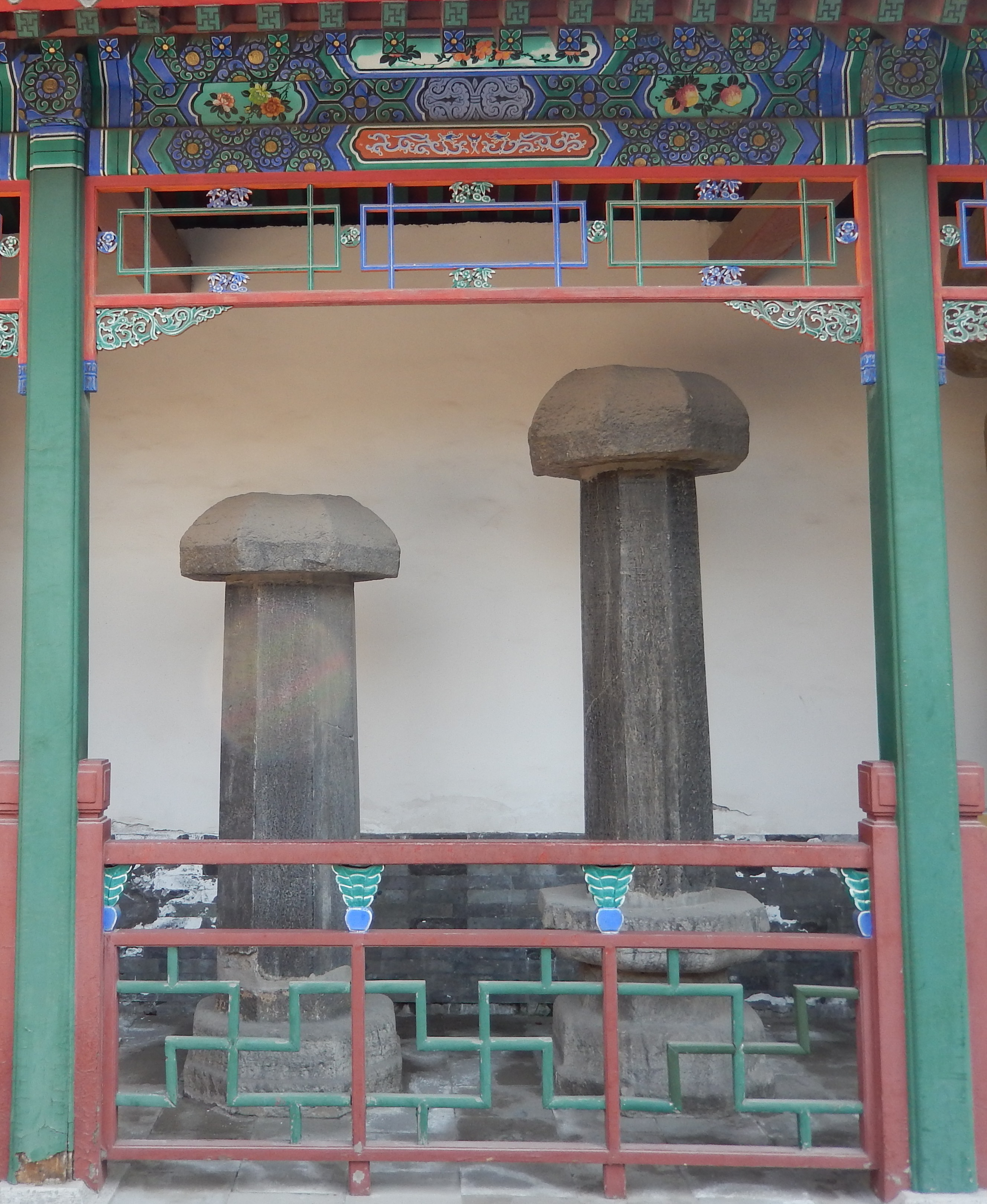
Tangut dharani pillars erected in 1502, now at the Ancient Lotus Pond (古蓮花池) in Baoding.

Dharani pillars are usually octagonal in shape, and are engraved with Buddhist dharani or dharani-sutras in Chinese characters. They may also be decorated with relief sculptures of Buddhist motifs or dragons. The pillar is seated on a base, and is covered by an overhanging canopy. Dharani pillars may be simple, with a base, an octagonal column, and a canopy; or may be multi-storeyed, with two or more columns separated from each other by a canopy. The multi-storeyed forms may resemble miniature pagodas.

=== Texts ===
Dharani are short incantations in Sanskrit, similar to mantras. Dharani-sutras are extensive texts formed from multiple, often repeated, dharani incantations. Dharani-sutras that are engraved on dharani pillars include:

- Dharani of Great Compassion (Chinese: 大悲真言; pinyin: dàbēi zhēnyán), also known as the Dharani-sutra of Thousand-Arm and Thousand-Eye Avalokiteśvara's Vast, Perfect and Unhindered Great Compassion Chinese: 千手千眼觀世音菩薩廣大圓滿無礙大悲心陀羅尼經; pinyin: qiānshǒu qiānyǎn guānshìyīn púsà guǎngdà yuánmǎn wú'ài dàbēixīn tuóluóní jīng
- Dharani-sutra of Protection for the King of the Country (Chinese: 守護國界主陀羅尼經; pinyin: shǒuhù guójièzhǔ tuóluóní jīng)
- Dharani-sutra of the Victorious Buddha-Crown (Chinese: 佛頂尊勝陀羅尼經; pinyin: fódǐng zūnshèng tuóluóní jīng; Sanskrit: Uṣṇīṣa-vijaya-dhāraṇī-sūtra)

On most dharani pillars, the dharani or dharani-sutras are written in Chinese characters, phonetically transcribing the original Sanskrit text. Occasionally the dharani text may be transcribed using other writing systems. In 1962 two Ming Dynasty Tangut dharani pillars were discovered in a village in the north of Baoding, where a Buddhist temple with a white, stupa-shaped pagoda once stood. These pillars were engraved with the Dharani of the Victorious Buddha-Crown transcribed in the Tangut script. According to a Chinese inscription on one of the pillars, they were erected in the 10th month of the 15th year of the Hongzhi era (1502), and are the latest known examples of the Tangut script.

== Modern practice ==
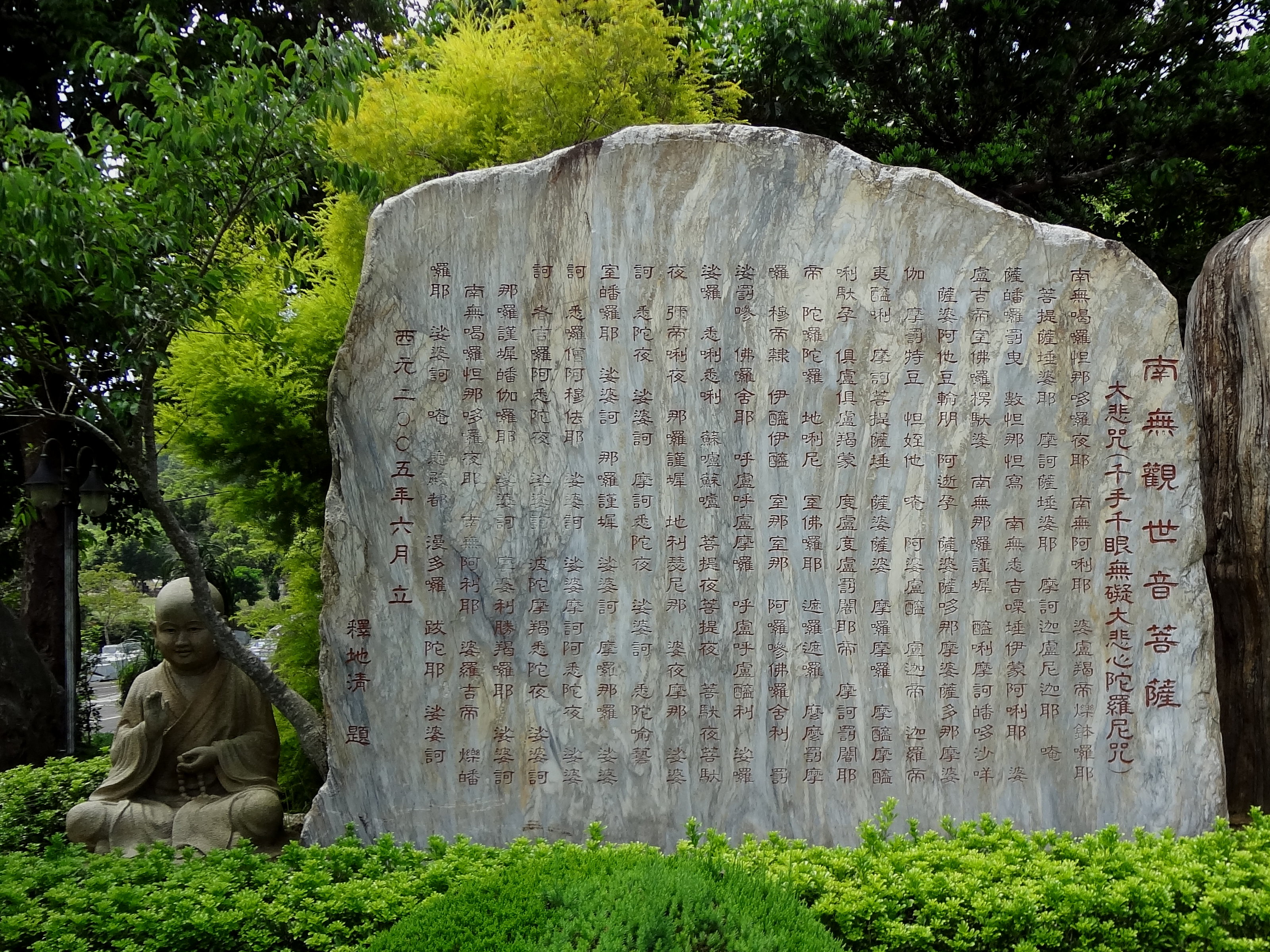
The Nīlakaṇṭha Dhāraṇī engraved on a stele.Temple Fo Ding Shan Chao Sheng in Sanyi Township, Taiwan. Erected in June 2005.

In the 21st century, the tradition of carving dharanis in stone still lives on.

As an example, we can cite the Dharani of Great Compassion , the Nīlakaṇṭha Dhāraṇī (Chinese: 大悲咒 Dàbēi zhòu ), one of the most popular hymns of the mahāyāna Buddhism (the only one to be recited in Chinese-speaking monasteries (China, Hong-Kong, Taiwan, Singapore), Korea, Japan and Vietnam), which was carved not on an octagonal pillar, but on a monumental block of stone of rectangular shape, rounded at its top.

The inscription is written in red, on one side only, without any other decorative motif. To the left of the stele, next to the end of the text, there is a sculpture representing a young monk seated in lotus position. He has a Buddhist Prayer beads (Japamala), in his left hand, and makes the Abhayamudrā, symbol of protection, with the right one.

The stele was erected in 2005, in the grounds of Fo Ding Shan temple in Sanyi, Miaoli, on the island of Taiwan, in East Asia (see picture).

== See also ==
- Chinese pagodas
- Mani stones
- Stupa
- Nīlakaṇṭha Dhāraṇī
