= Mani stone =

Buddhist prayer stone

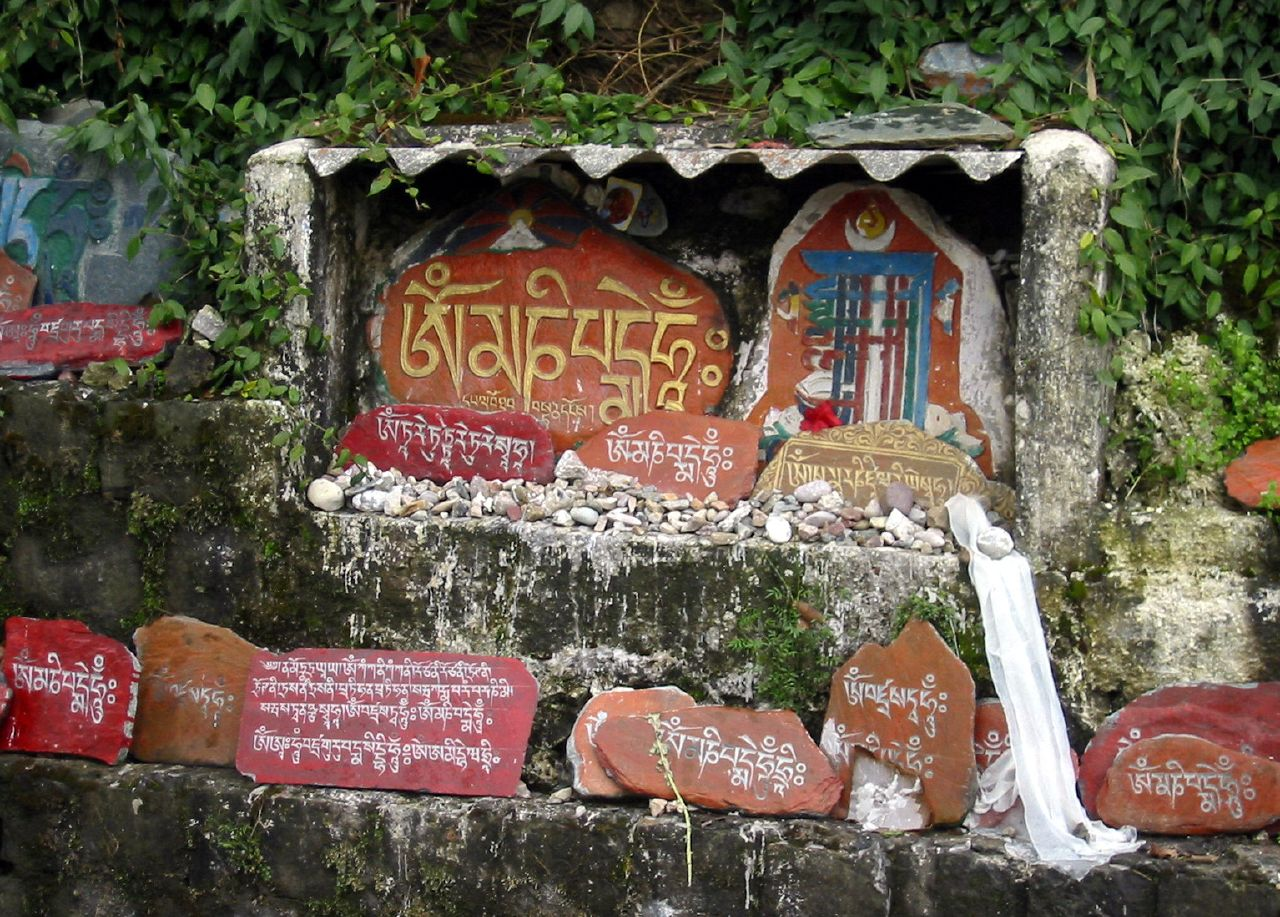
Mani stones outside the Tsuglagkhang Complex, near the 14th Dalai Lama's home, McLeod Ganj, Dharamshala, India

Mani stones are stone plates, rocks, or pebbles inscribed with the six-syllabled mantra of Avalokiteshvara (Om mani padme hum, hence the name mani stone) as a form of prayer in Tibetan Buddhism. The term mani stone may also be used to refer to stones on which any mantra or devotional designs (such as ashtamangala) are inscribed or painted. Mani stones are intentionally placed along the roadsides and rivers or grouped together to form mounds, cairns, or sometimes long walls, as an offering to spirits of place or genius loci. Creating and carving mani stones as devotional or intentional process art is a traditional sadhana of piety to yidam. Mani stones are a form of devotional cintamani.

The preferred technique is sunk relief, where an area around each letter is carved out, leaving the letters at the original surface level, now higher than the background. The stones are often painted in symbolic colours for each syllable (om white, ma green, ni yellow, pad light blue, me red, hum dark blue), which may be renewed when they are lost by weathering.

== Mani walls ==
Along the paths of regions under the influence of Tibetan Buddhism, mani stones are often placed in long stacks along trails, forming mani walls. Buddhist custom dictates that these walls should be passed or circumvented from the left side, the clockwise direction in which the earth and the universe revolve, according to Buddhist doctrine.

They are sometimes close to a temple or chorten, sometimes completely isolated and range from a few metres to a kilometre long and one to two metres high. They are built of rubble and sand and faced with mani stones engraved in the Tibetan script.

== Nepal ==
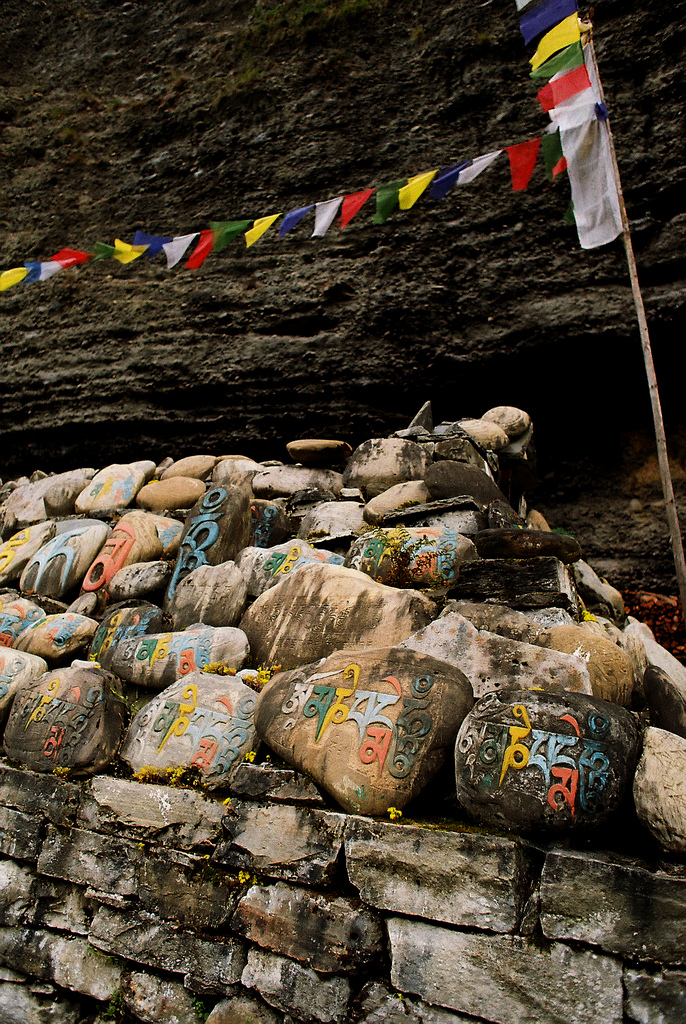
Mani stones in Nepal showing symbolic colouring of each syllable

The same type of mani stones can be seen in neighbouring Nepal, where Buddhism is also widely practised. Large examples of mani stones resembling tablets carved out of the sides of rock formations are in locations throughout the Nepali areas of the Himalayas, such as Namche Bazar. Mani stone walls are most numerous in the high country of the Khumbu. The mantra of Avalokiteshvara is also a common design on prayer wheels and prayer flags in Nepal.

== Gallery ==
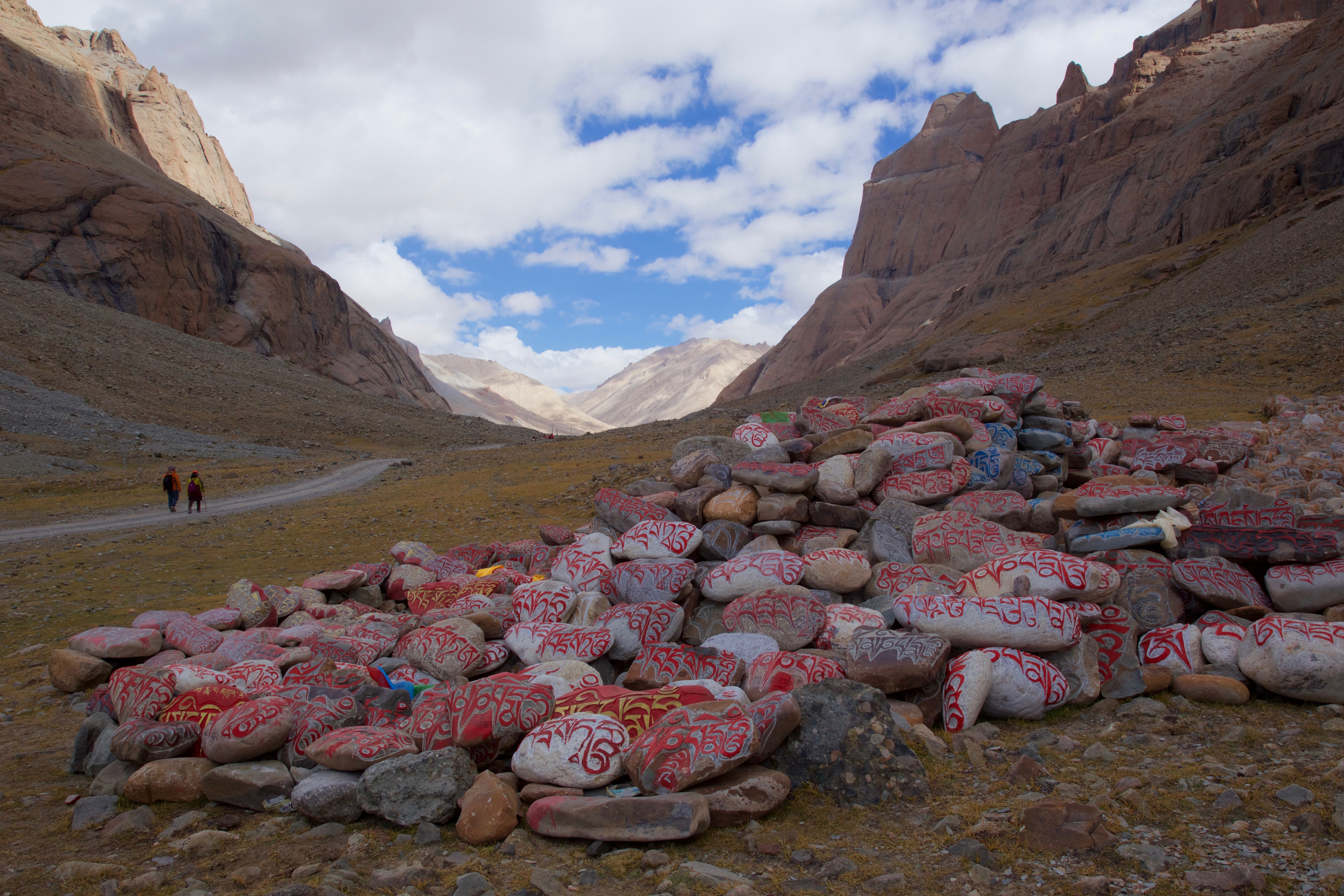
Large Mani stones by the Mount Kailash pilgrimage path, Tibet

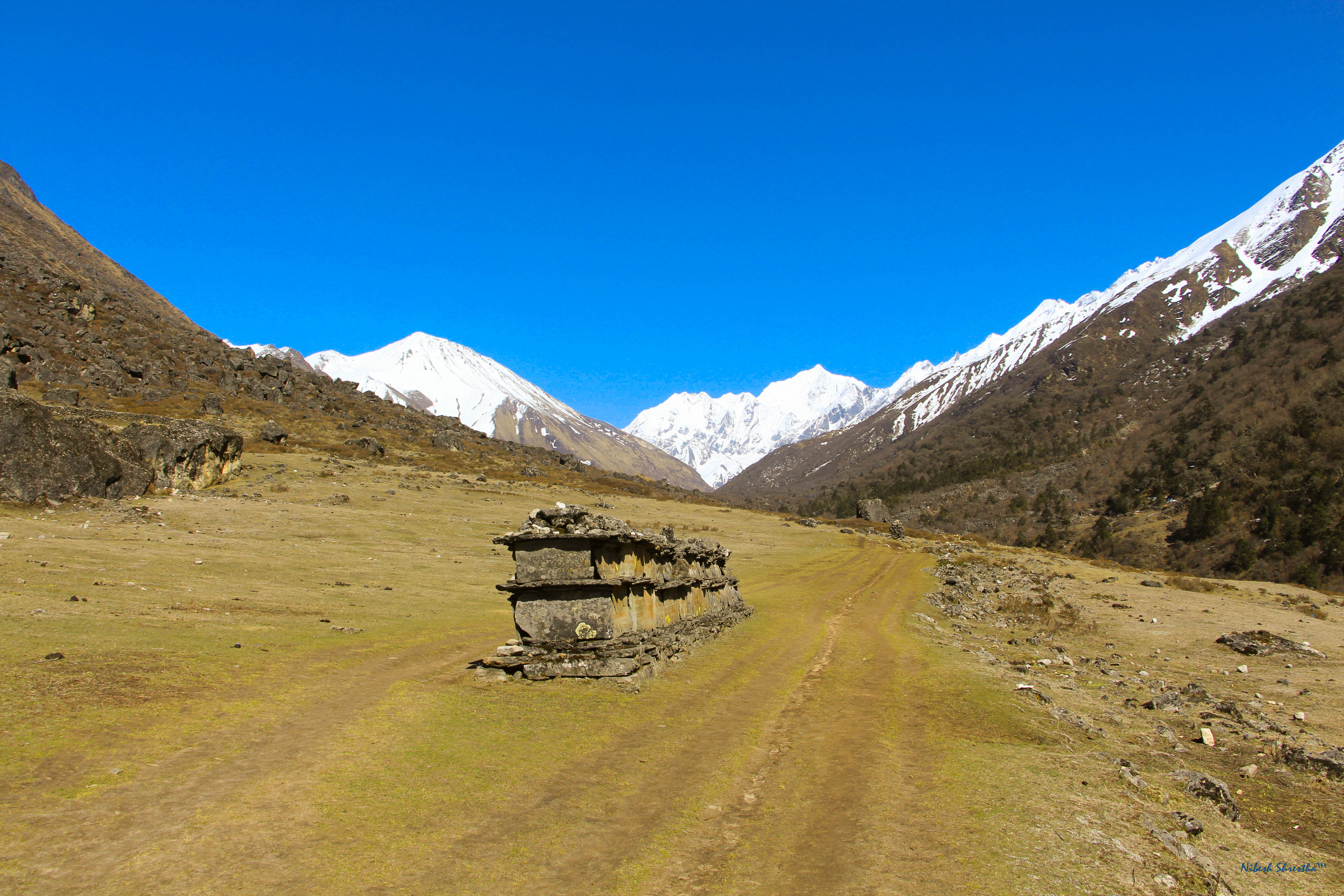
Mani wall in the Langtang Valley, Route to Kyanzing Valley, Nepal.

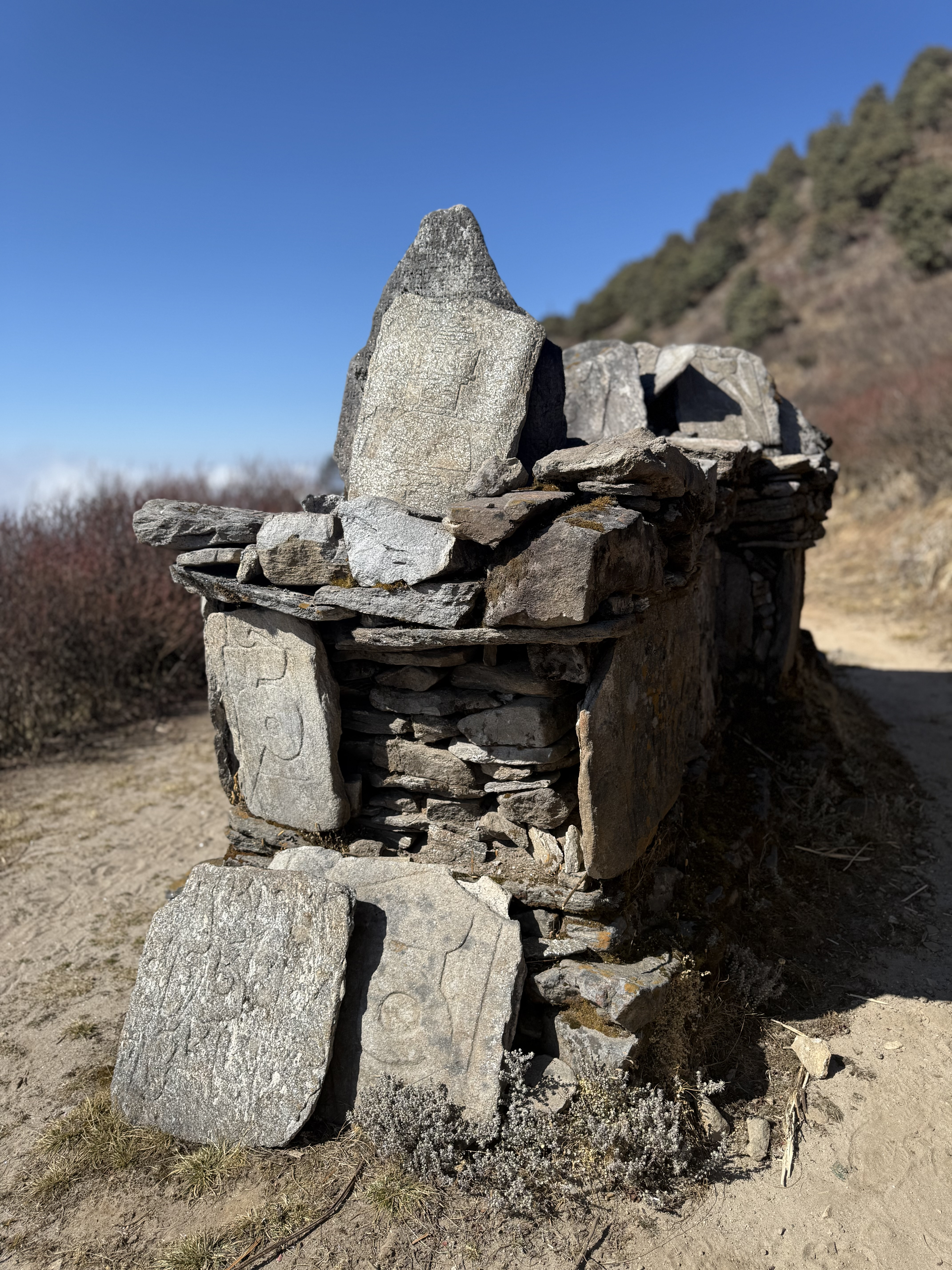
Mani wall on the path between Ngawur and Pikey Base Camp, Nepal.

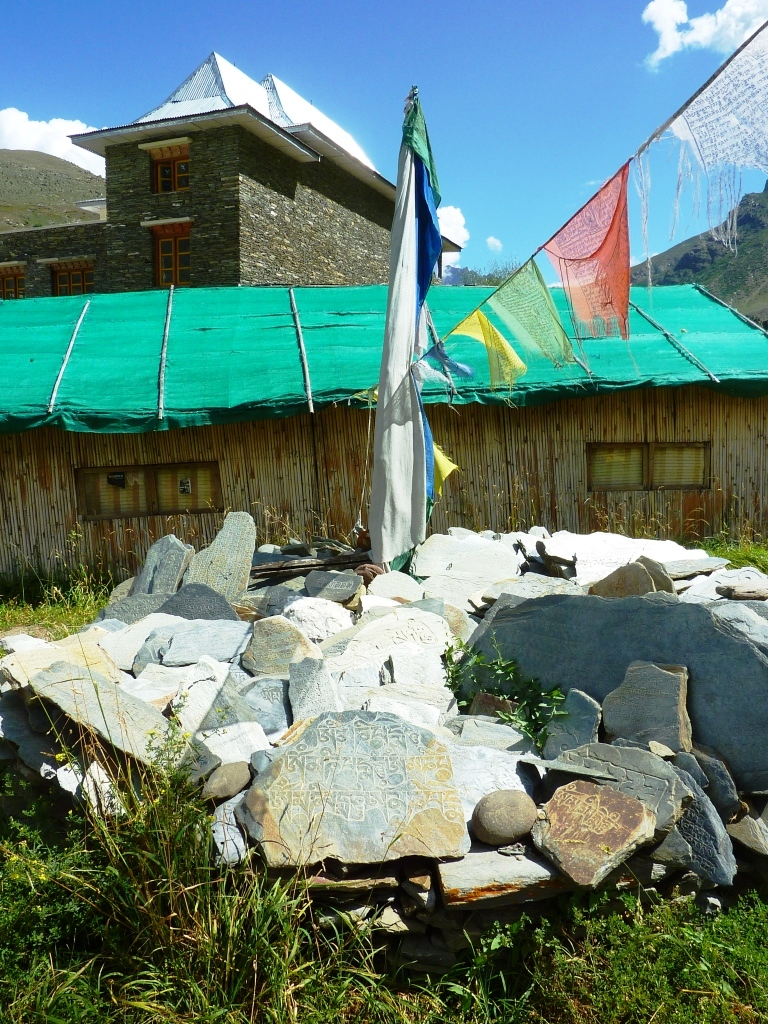
Mani stones & prayer flags, Gandhola Monastery, Lahaul.

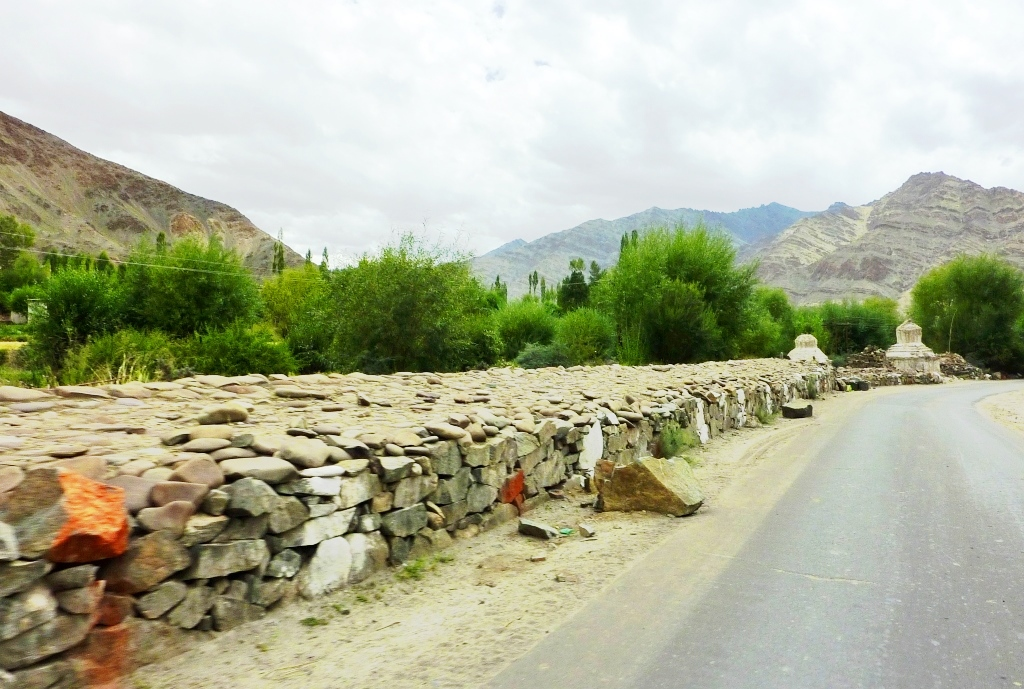
Mani wall along driveway to Hemis Monastery

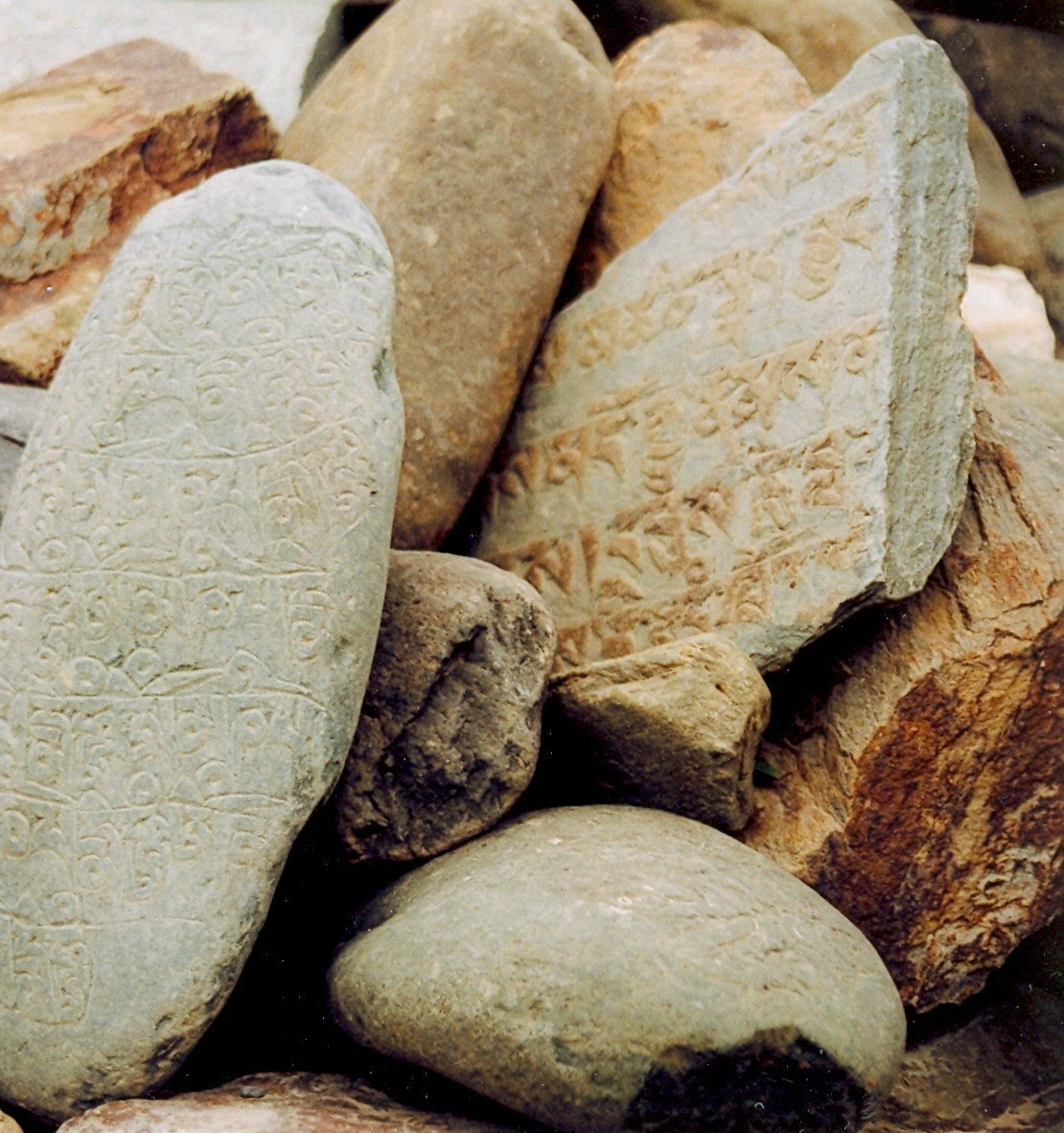
Mani stones in Ladakh, India

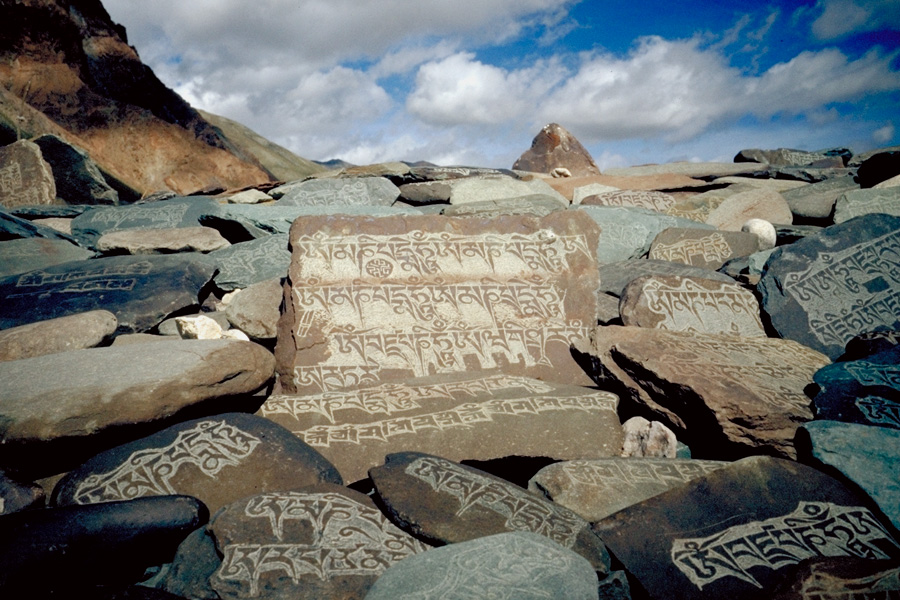
Mani wall in Zanskar subdistrict, Ladakh

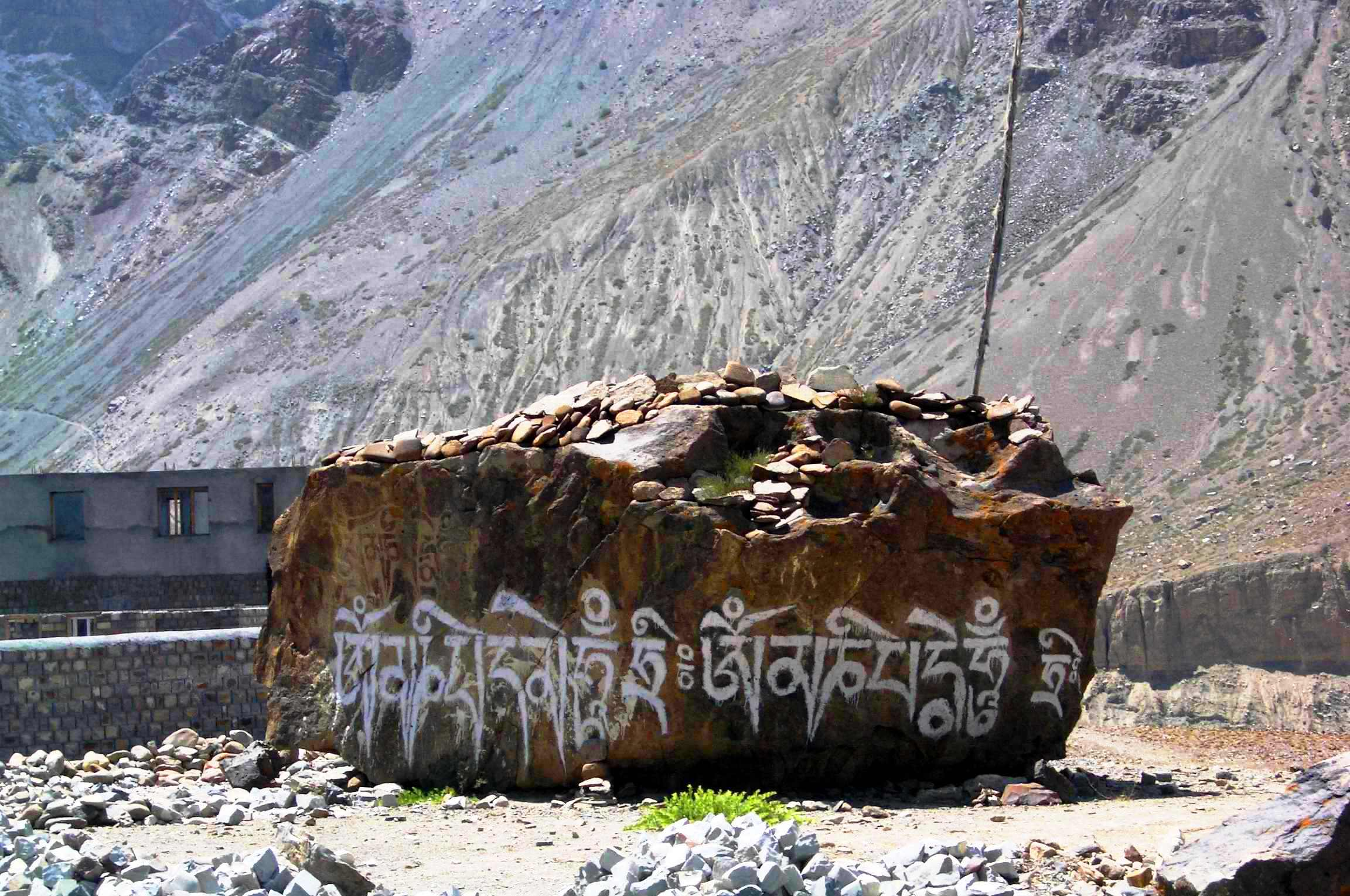
Huge mani stone in the Spiti Valley, India

== See also ==
- Gsumge Mani Stone Castle
- Śarīra
- Stele of Sulaiman, 1348 stele with Om mani padme hum inscribed in six scripts
- Yongning Temple Stele, 1413 stele with Om mani padme hum inscribed in four scripts
