= Shule River =

Second largest inland river in Gansu Province, China

疏勒河
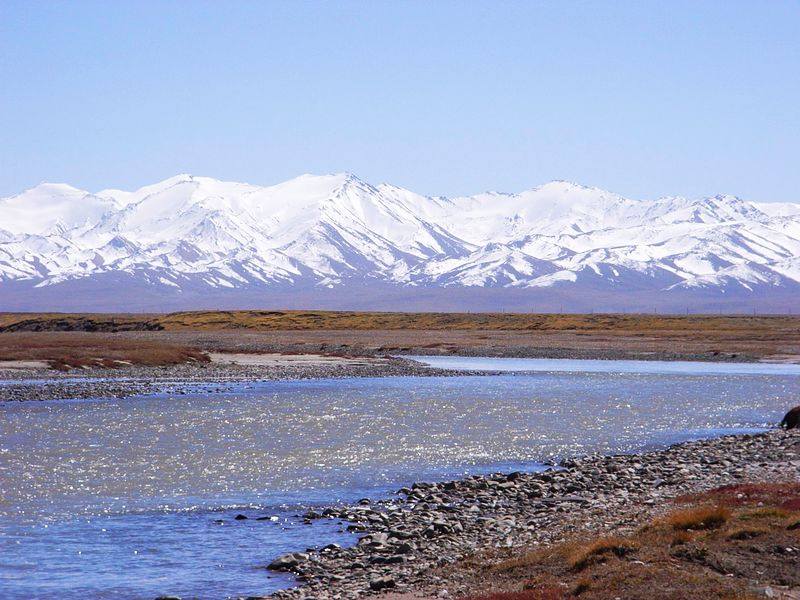

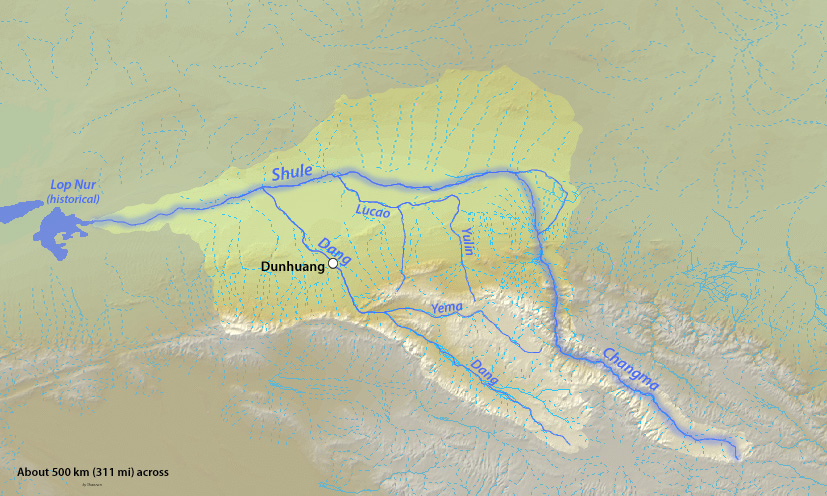

Physical characteristics
- Length: 861 km (535 mi)
- Basin size: 102,300 km^{2} (39,500 sq mi)
- Discharge
  - average: 28.8 m^{3}/s (1,020 cu ft/s)
  - minimum: 0 m^{3}/s (0 cu ft/s)
  - maximum: 1,620 m^{3}/s (57,000 cu ft/s)

The Shule River (Chinese: 疏勒河; pinyin: Shūlè Hé) is the second largest inland river in Gansu Province, China, and one of the three major inland river systems in the Hexi Corridor.

== Water system ==
The Shule River system is composed of the main stream Changma River, Shiyou River, Baiyang River, Tashi River and Dang River.The main stream originates from the Shaguolinamujimu Mountains (Chinese: 沙果林那穆吉木岭) between the South Tuolai Mountains and the South Shule Mountains in the western part of the Qilian Mountains. Most of the water comes from 347 glaciers with a total area of 29.45 square kilometers in the upstream catchment. The northwest flows through Shule Gorge, Naliu Gorge and Liugou Gorge into the Changmabao Basin. After exiting Changma Gorge, it forms the largest alluvial fan in the Hexi Corridor, the Changma alluvial fan, and flows along the fan edge to Guazhou through the west turn of Yumen City. The Shuangta Reservoir in the county flows into the Anxi-Dunhuang Basin, flows westward to the Changma Reservoir in Yumen City, and enters Lake Hala in the Lop Nor desert after the confluence of Dang River in Dunhuang City. The upper reaches of Changma Reservoir are the upper reaches, the flat land of the Hexi Corridor from Changma Gorge to Shuangta Reservoir is the middle reaches, and the lower reaches of the Shuangta Reservoir to the Lop Nor desert are the lower reaches.

== Hydrology ==
The Shule River has a total length of 861 kilometers, with a water-bearing section of about 770 kilometers in summer and 540 kilometers in winter, with a catchment area of 20,197 square kilometers and a drainage area of 102,300 square kilometers, with an average flow of 28.8m3/s and the maximum flow rate is 1,620m3/s. The river runoff in the Shule River Basin is 1,548 million cubic meters, of which the Changma River is 994 million cubic meters and the Danghe River is 453 million cubic meters. The groundwater recharge in the Shule River Basin accounts for 29.1%, the glacier recharge accounts for 31.4%, and the rainfall recharge accounts for 39.5%.

== Utilization ==
In 1734, a 30-kilometer-long channel was built in the Caotan of Yinmachang to divert water for irrigation. In the Shule River Basin, 5 reservoirs, including the Shuangta Reservoir, the Danghe Reservoir and the Chijinxia Reservoir, have a water storage capacity of 1 million cubic kilometers. Reservoir above the foot. The alluvial plain in the middle and lower reaches is an agricultural area, and the river runoff decreases year by year due to the increase of irrigation diversion. Historically, the Shule River has flowed into Lop Nur seasonally. Due to excessive irrigation and diversion, the river can only flow to Hala Lake, which is 131 kilometers away from the Lop Nur Basin.
