= Touming Mengke Glacier =

Glacier in China

- Location within China
- Interactive map of Touming Mengke Glacier
- Location: Subei County, Gansu, China
- Coordinates: 39°31′30″N 96°30′20″E

The Touming Mengke glacier (Chinese: 透明梦柯冰川) is one of China's largest glaciers.

The glacier is 10.1 kilometres (6.3 mi) long. It covers 21.9 square kilometres (8.5 sq mi). It is located in the Qilian Mountain range, in Subei County.

The New York Times profiled the glacier's retreat as symbolic of the dangers of global warming. A report by the research center said the retreat of the Mengke Glacier and two others in the Qilian range accelerated gradually in the 1990s, then tripled their speed in the 2000s. In the last decade, the glaciers have been disappearing at a faster rate than at any time since 1960.

== See also ==
- Rongbuk Glacier
