= Western Expedition (1936) =

Battle of the Chinese civil war

Western Route Army campaign
- Part of Chinese Civil War
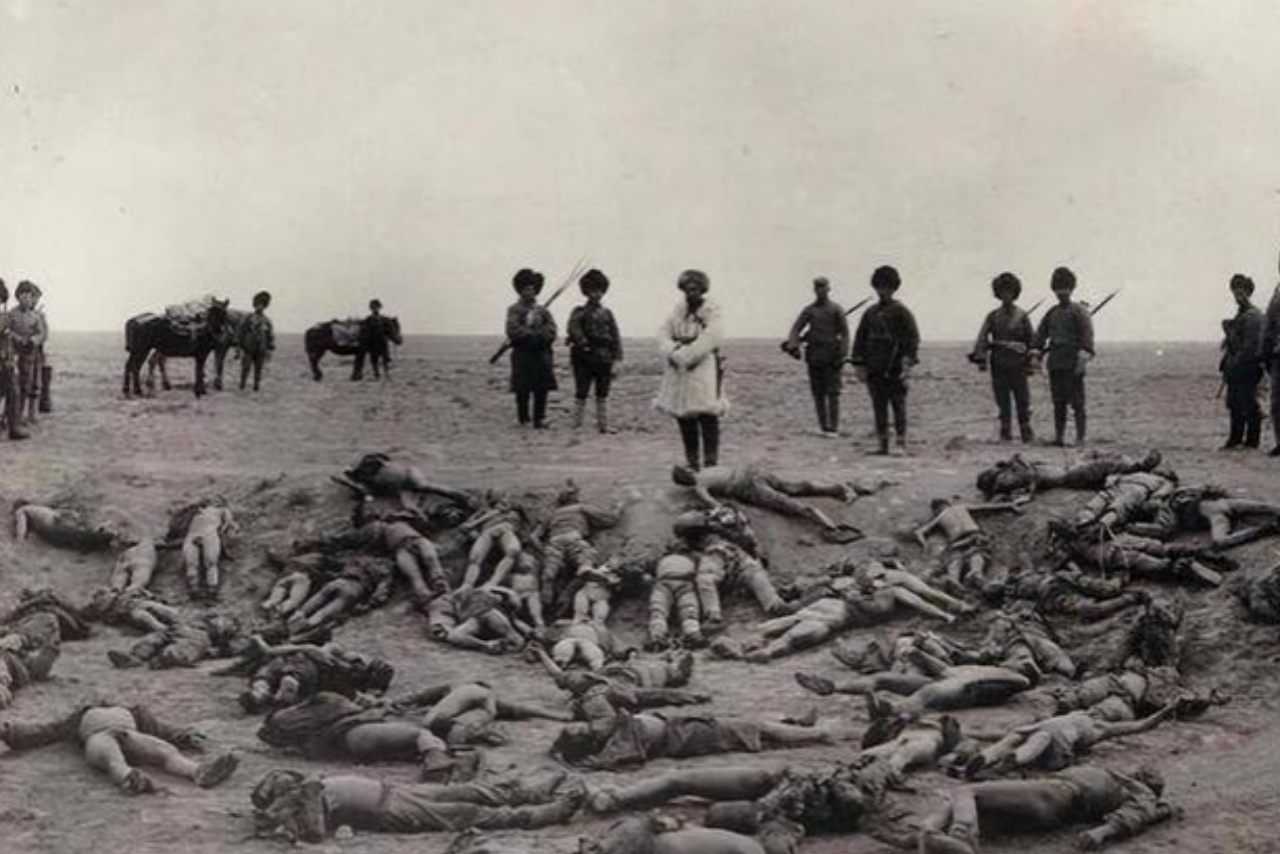
- Ma clique aligned National Revolutionary Army soldiers overlook the corpses of Chinese Red Army soldiers
Date	October 1936 – May 1937
Location	Hexi Corridor, Gansu, China
Result	Nationalist victory

Belligerents
Chinese Red Army; Western Route Army	(Republic of China (1912–1949)) National Revolutionary Army; Ma clique

Commanders and leaders
Xu Xiangqian; Dong Zhentang †; Yang Keming †; Sun Yuqing (executed)	(Republic of China (1912–1949)) Ma Bufang (Republic of China (1912–1949)) Ma Buqing

Strength
~21,000	~100,000

Casualties and losses
7000 killed 9,000 captured	15,000 casualties

The Battle of the Western Expedition took place from October 1936 to May 1937. The battle was conducted by the Red Army in the Hexi Corridor. However, due to poor resource management and supply decisions, the Red Army suffered heavy losses, with nearly 400 soldiers attempting to break through the encirclement.

== Background ==
Following the Long March, the Chinese Communist Party (CCP) leadership sought to expand its strategic position in northwestern China. One of its principal objectives was to establish a land route toward Xinjiang and the Soviet Union in order to facilitate communication and, if possible, obtain military assistance. To achieve this, part of the Fourth Front Army was ordered to cross the Yellow River and advance westward into the Hexi Corridor. On 11 November 1936, the forces west of the Yellow River were officially reorganized as the Western Route Army, with Xu Xiangqian appointed commander and Chen Changhao serving as political commissar. The force consisted mainly of the 5th, 9th, and 30th Red Armies and numbered approximately 21,000 personnel. The advance of the Western Route Army threatened the control of the Nationalist-aligned Ma clique over Gansu and Qinghai. In response, the forces of Ma Bufang and Ma Buqing, supported by the Nationalist government, concentrated their troops to block the Red Army's advance through the Hexi Corridor. The ensuing campaign developed into a prolonged series of engagements between the Western Route Army and the Ma clique forces during late 1936 and early 1937.

== Battle ==
=== Westward Advance and the Battle of Gulang (November 1936) ===
In November 1936, after crossing the Yellow River, the Western Route Army advanced westward into the Hexi Corridor. The Red Army hoped to expand its operational space in Northwest China by advancing towards western Gansu and Xinjiang. During its westward advance, the Western Route Army encountered resistance from the Ma Clique army led by Ma Bufang and Ma Buqing, and a battle broke out between the two sides in the Gulang area. In mid-November 1936, the Ninth Red Army attacked Gulang and briefly occupied the county seat, but was subsequently counterattacked by the Ma Clique army. After several days of fierce fighting, the Ninth Red Army suffered heavy losses, and the Western Route Army continued its westward retreat.

=== Operations in the Yongchang and Shandan Areas (November to December 1936) ===
Following the Battle of Gulang, the Western Route Army entered the Yongchang and Shandan line and engaged in continuous fighting. The Western Route Army attempted to establish temporary bases in local towns while resisting the continuous attacks of the Ma Clique army. This phase lasted for more than a month. Although the Western Route Army achieved some victories, its overall situation gradually deteriorated due to troop depletion, insufficient ammunition, and difficulty in obtaining supplies.

=== The Battle of Gaotai and the Fall of Linze (January 1937) ===
In January 1937, the Fifth Army of the Western Route Army occupied Gaotai County and established a defensive position there. Subsequently, the Ma Clique army concentrated its forces to besiege Gaotai. After fierce fighting, Gaotai ultimately fell, and senior generals, including Dong Zhentang, commander of the Fifth Army, were killed in action, and the troops suffered heavy losses. After the fall of Gaotai, part of the Western Route Army withdrew to the Linze area to rejoin the main force.

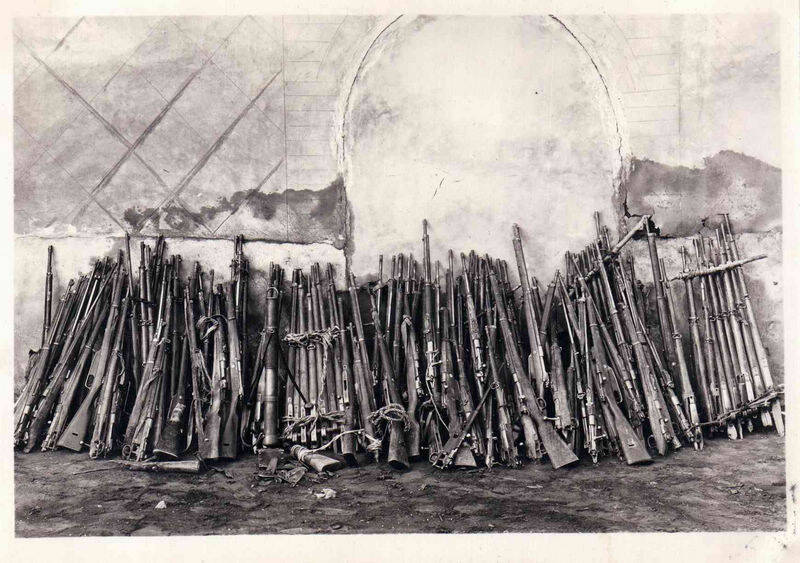
Red Army weapons captured by Ma Jiajun

=== The Battle of Nijiayingzi (January–February 1937) ===
At the end of January 1937, the main force of the Western Route Army concentrated in the Nijiayingzi area of Linze, relying on local villages for defense. The Ma Clique army subsequently launched several attacks, resulting in a long and fierce battle. After about a month of fighting, the Western Route Army, due to prolonged attrition and insufficient food and ammunition, gradually lost the ability to continue holding its ground and began to seek opportunities to break out.

=== Breakout from Sandao Liugou and Liyuankou (March 1937) ===
In March 1937, the remnants of the Western Route Army began their breakout attempt, engaging in further battles with the Ma Clique army at Sandao Liugou and Liyuankou. Continuous fighting further weakened the Western Route Army, and the troops gradually lost their complete organizational structure.

=== Shiwo Conference and Troop Dispersal (March 1937) ===
In March 1937, the remnants of the Western Route Army retreated to the Shiwo area in the Qilian Mountains and held the Shiwo Conference. The conference decided that Xu Xiangqian and Chen Changhao would return to northern Shaanxi to report to the Central Committee, while the remaining personnel would disperse. Among them, Li Xiannian led a portion of the troops to Xinjiang; other units attempted to return to northern Shaanxi or engage in guerrilla activities.

== Consequences ==
After the Western Route Army campaign, the main force of the Western Route Army was essentially incapacitated. Most troops were killed, wounded, scattered, or captured during battles, breakouts, and transfers; only a small number successfully reached Xinjiang or returned to northern Shaanxi. This campaign inflicted heavy losses on the Fourth Front Army of the Chinese Workers' and Peasants' Red Army and marked the basic end of the Western Route Army's organizational structure. After the campaign, the Central Committee of the Chinese Communist Party summarized the Western Route Army's operations and subsequently placed greater emphasis on logistical support, unified command, and base area construction in military operations. There are differing opinions in academia regarding the reasons for the campaign's failure. Most studies believe that difficulties in supply, a significant disparity in troop strength, a complex geographical environment, and strategic decision-making all contributed to the Western Route Army's ultimate defeat; however, different researchers still offer different explanations for the relative importance of each factor. According to some Chinese historical records, after the Battle of Gaotai, the heads of fallen generals such as Dong Zhentang and Yang Keming were cut off and displayed to the public; however, different historical records differ regarding the personnel involved and the specific details.

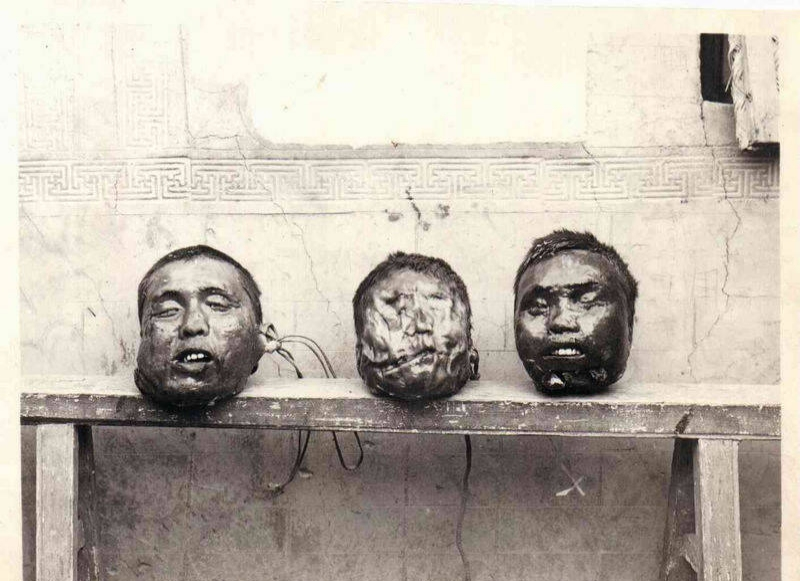
The severed heads of Dong Zhentang, Yang Keming, and Sun Yuqing
