= Yanzhi Mountains =

Mountain range in Gansu, China

- Shandan Mountains
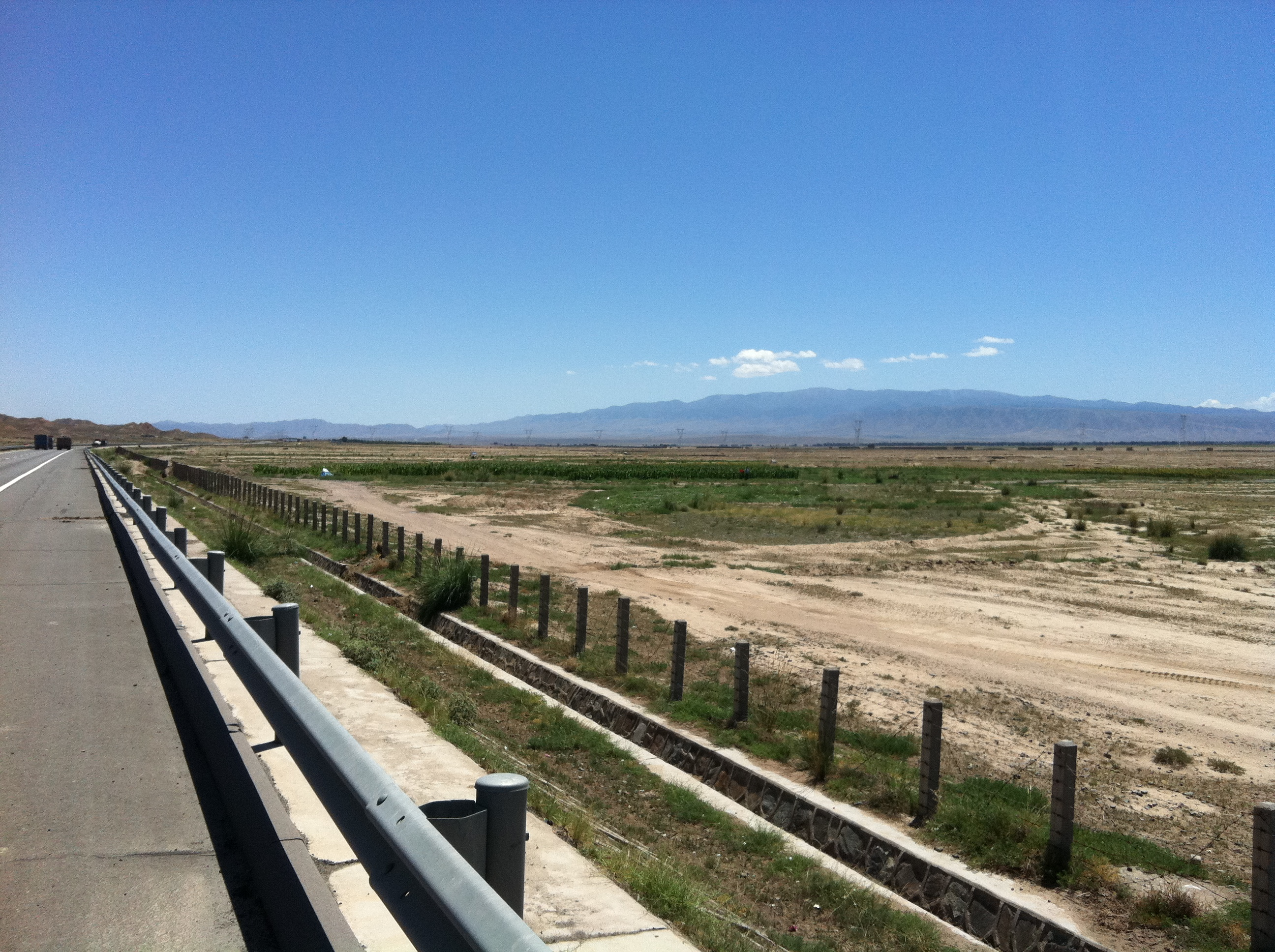
- Seen from the north along Expressway G30

Highest point
- Peak: Maomao Mountain
- Elevation: 3,978 m (13,051 ft)
- Coordinates: 38.38°N 101.36°E

Geography
- Location within Gansu
- Country: China
- State: Gansu Province
- Parent range: Qilian Mountains

The Yanzhi Mountains, (Note: Chinese: 焉支山 (also written 胭脂山 and 燕支山), Pinyin: Yānzhī Shān) also called the Shandan Mountains, (Note: Chinese: 刪丹山, Pinyin: Shāndān Shān) are located south of the Hexi Corridor, about 50 km southeast of the urban area of Shandan County in Gansu, China. They rise from their base of about 2,900 metres to a maximum elevation of 3,978 m and are part of the Qilian Mountains.

== Etymology ==
There are multiple different writings of their name.

The common one is said to be the phonetic equivalent of Eshi, (Note: Chinese: 阏氏) the name of a Chanyu's wife.

Another version has the explanation that during the Five Dynasties and Ten Kingdoms period, the mountains are said to have been rich in red orchids which were used to make rouge (Note: Chinese: 胭脂, Pinyin: yānzhī) or yanzhi for cosmetic products.

== History ==
During the reign of Emperor Wu of Han, the general Huo Qubing led an army deep into the Hexi Corridor, occupying the Qilian Mountains and annihilating more than 30,000 enemy troops as well as capturing over 100 prisoners, including the Xiongnu chieftain's wife, Eshi. According to The Old Stories of Xihe, the Xiongnu people at the time sang sorrowfully: "We lost the Qilian Mountains, and our livestock failed to thrive; we lost the Yanzhi Mountains, and our women lost their beauty."

Emperor Yang of Sui once received envoys from 27 countries at the Yanzhi Mountains.

According to the Tangut encyclopedia Sea of Meanings, (Note: Simplified Chinese: 圣立义海, Traditional Chinese: 聖立義海) yaks raised in the Yanzhi Mountains were renowned specialties.

== In literature ==
In the Tang Dynasty, the poet Li Bai wrote the famous line: "Though I dwell in the Yanzhi Mountains, do not say the northern snow is cold", expressing its allure despite the bitter coldness.

== Forest park ==
Today, Yanzhi Mountain Forest Park (Note: Chinese: 焉支山森林公园) has been established over 680 square kilometres including the highest peak of the range, Maomao Mountain (3,978 m). Zhongshan Temple is located on its top. The park has been dubbed "Little Yellow Mountain of the Hexi Corridor", referring to Huangshan.
