= Subei Mongol Autonomous County =

Subei Mongol Autonomous County 肃北蒙古族自治县 · ᠰᠦᠪᠧᠢ ᠶᠢᠨ ᠮᠣᠩᠭᠣᠯ ᠦᠨᠳᠦᠰᠦᠲᠡᠨ ᠦ ᠥᠪᠡᠷᠲᠡᠭᠡᠨ ᠵᠠᠰᠠᠬᠤ ᠰᠢᠶᠠᠨ Su-pei
- Autonomous county
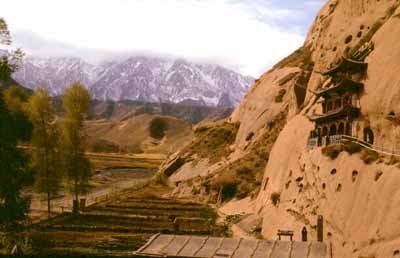
- The Qilian Mountains in Subei County

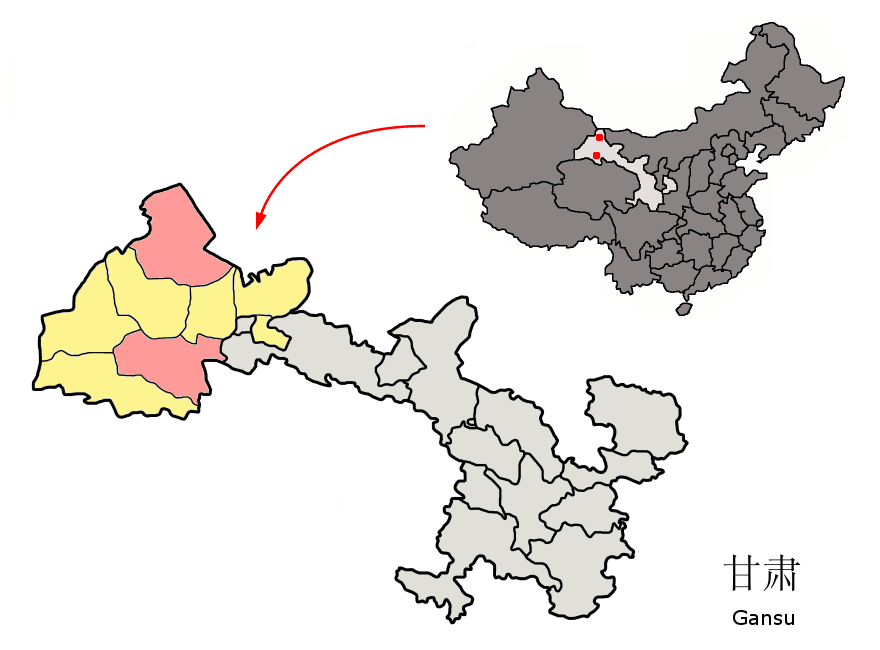
- Subei County (red) within Jiuquan City (yellow) and Gansu

- Location of the seat in Gansu Subei (China)
- Coordinates (Subei government): 39°30′45″N 94°52′36″E
- Country: China
- Province: Gansu
- Prefecture-level city: Jiuquan
- Established date: July 29, 1950
- County seat: Dangchengwan
- Township-level Divisions: 2 towns, 2 townships

Area
  - Total: 66,748 km^{2} (25,772 sq mi)

Population (2020)
  - Total: 15,093
  - Density: 0.22612/km^{2} (0.58565/sq mi)
- Time zone: UTC+8 (China Standard)
- Postal code: 736300
- License plate prefixes: 甘F
- Website: www.subei.gov.cn (in Chinese)

Subei Mongol Autonomous County

Chinese name
- Traditional Chinese: 肅北蒙古族自治縣
- Simplified Chinese: 肃北蒙古族自治县
Transcriptions
Standard Mandarin
- Hanyu Pinyin: Sùběi Měnggǔzú Zìzhìxiàn

Mongolian name
- Mongolian Cyrillic: Сүбэй Монгол өөртөө засах шянь
- Mongolian script: ᠰᠦᠪᠧᠢ ᠶᠢᠨ ᠮᠣᠩᠭᠣᠯ ᠦᠨᠳᠦᠰᠦᠲᠡᠨ ᠦ ᠥᠪᠡᠷᠲᠡᠭᠡᠨ ᠵᠠᠰᠠᠬᠤ ᠰᠢᠶᠠᠨ
Transcriptions
- SASM/GNC: sübēi-yin moŋɣol ündüsüten-ü öbertegen ǰasaꭓu siyan

The Subei Mongol Autonomous County (Chinese: 肃北蒙古族自治县; Mongolian: ᠰᠦᠪᠧᠢ ᠶᠢᠨ ᠮᠣᠩᠭᠣᠯ ᠦᠨᠳᠦᠰᠦᠲᠡᠨ ᠦ ᠥᠪᠡᠷᠲᠡᠭᠡᠨ ᠵᠠᠰᠠᠬᠤ ᠰᠢᠶᠠᠨ) is an autonomous county within the prefecture-level city of Jiuquan in the northwest of Gansu Province, China, bordering Xinjiang to the west, Qinghai Province to the southeast and Mongolia's Govi-Altai Province to the north. Containing the northernmost point in Gansu, Subei is split into two non-contiguous sections and has an area of 66,748 km^{2} (25,772 sq mi) and had approximately 13,046 inhabitants in 2000. To the east it shares a border with Ejin Banner, Alxa League, Inner Mongolia.

== History ==
In the early 1930s, Birger Bohlin studied the paleontology of the region (then called Taban Buluk).

In 1937, Subei Administrate Bureau (肅北設治局) was established.

On July 22, 1950, PLA forces entered the Subei area. The county-level Subei Autonomous District (肅北自治區), predecessor of the Subei Mongol Autonomous County, was established on July 29, 1950. The area became county-level Subei Mongol Autonomous District (肃北蒙古族自治区) in 1953. In 1955, the area became Subei Mongol Autonomous County.

In September 1992, with the approval of the State Council of the People's Republic of China, the only international border crossing in Gansu Province was opened in the Mazongshan area of Subei Mongol Autonomous County.

Horse shows and races are held periodically in the county.

== Climate ==
A large part of Subei is in the Gobi Desert. The county has been subject to large dust storms with noted incidents in May 2011 and June 2016. There are glaciers in some parts of the county.

Climate data for Subei, elevation 2,137 m (7,011 ft), (1991–2020 normals, extremes 1981–2010)
Month	Jan	Feb	Mar	Apr	May	Jun	Jul	Aug	Sep	Oct	Nov	Dec	Year
Record high °C (°F)	13.6 (56.5)	17.1 (62.8)	21.9 (71.4)	29.6 (85.3)	31.7 (89.1)	33.7 (92.7)	36.4 (97.5)	36.7 (98.1)	31.4 (88.5)	27.2 (81.0)	19.2 (66.6)	15.6 (60.1)	36.7 (98.1)
Mean daily maximum °C (°F)	−0.2 (31.6)	3.3 (37.9)	9.7 (49.5)	16.4 (61.5)	20.1 (68.2)	23.8 (74.8)	26.5 (79.7)	25.9 (78.6)	21.1 (70.0)	14.5 (58.1)	7.2 (45.0)	1.5 (34.7)	14.2 (57.5)
Daily mean °C (°F)	−8.1 (17.4)	−4.4 (24.1)	2.2 (36.0)	8.8 (47.8)	13.2 (55.8)	17.1 (62.8)	19.4 (66.9)	18.7 (65.7)	13.4 (56.1)	6.7 (44.1)	−0.1 (31.8)	−6.5 (20.3)	6.7 (44.1)
Mean daily minimum °C (°F)	−14.5 (5.9)	−11.0 (12.2)	−4.6 (23.7)	1.4 (34.5)	5.7 (42.3)	10.1 (50.2)	12.2 (54.0)	11.5 (52.7)	6.3 (43.3)	0.2 (32.4)	−5.4 (22.3)	−12.6 (9.3)	−0.1 (31.9)
Record low °C (°F)	−22.4 (−8.3)	−20.5 (−4.9)	−23.8 (−10.8)	−11.9 (10.6)	−5.7 (21.7)	0.4 (32.7)	7.0 (44.6)	3.4 (38.1)	−3.6 (25.5)	−9.9 (14.2)	−18.9 (−2.0)	−23.1 (−9.6)	−23.8 (−10.8)
Average precipitation mm (inches)	3.5 (0.14)	3.6 (0.14)	7.1 (0.28)	8.3 (0.33)	19.1 (0.75)	36.2 (1.43)	37.8 (1.49)	26.9 (1.06)	9.9 (0.39)	3.6 (0.14)	4.1 (0.16)	4.4 (0.17)	164.5 (6.48)
Average precipitation days (≥ 0.1 mm)	3.7	2.8	3.1	2.7	4.5	6.5	7.5	5.9	2.6	1.7	2.4	4.0	47.4
Average snowy days	5.9	4.4	4.0	2.8	1.1	0	0	0	0.2	1.5	3.2	5.5	28.6
Average relative humidity (%)	41	36	32	28	31	38	44	40	36	34	38	41	37
Mean monthly sunshine hours	223.8	219.6	266.8	290.0	310.9	294.3	285.0	289.8	283.1	276.0	228.9	213.7	3,181.9
Percentage possible sunshine	74	72	71	72	70	66	63	69	77	81	77	74	72
Source: China Meteorological Administration

Climate data for Mazong Mountain, Subei, elevation 1,770 m (5,810 ft), (1991–2020 normals, extremes 1981-present)
Month	Jan	Feb	Mar	Apr	May	Jun	Jul	Aug	Sep	Oct	Nov	Dec	Year
Record high °C (°F)	14.1 (57.4)	14.5 (58.1)	21.2 (70.2)	28.6 (83.5)	31.3 (88.3)	34.6 (94.3)	36.7 (98.1)	35.2 (95.4)	31.7 (89.1)	26.2 (79.2)	19.5 (67.1)	12.3 (54.1)	36.7 (98.1)
Mean daily maximum °C (°F)	−3.5 (25.7)	0.8 (33.4)	7.2 (45.0)	14.8 (58.6)	20.8 (69.4)	26.1 (79.0)	28.4 (83.1)	26.7 (80.1)	21.0 (69.8)	13.1 (55.6)	4.6 (40.3)	−2.2 (28.0)	13.2 (55.7)
Daily mean °C (°F)	−12.0 (10.4)	−8.0 (17.6)	−1.4 (29.5)	6.7 (44.1)	13.2 (55.8)	19.0 (66.2)	21.4 (70.5)	19.4 (66.9)	12.9 (55.2)	4.4 (39.9)	−3.6 (25.5)	−10.4 (13.3)	5.1 (41.2)
Mean daily minimum °C (°F)	−18.8 (−1.8)	−15.2 (4.6)	−8.8 (16.2)	−1.0 (30.2)	5.2 (41.4)	11.5 (52.7)	14.4 (57.9)	12.3 (54.1)	5.7 (42.3)	−2.6 (27.3)	−9.9 (14.2)	−16.5 (2.3)	−2.0 (28.5)
Record low °C (°F)	−35.4 (−31.7)	−29.5 (−21.1)	−25.4 (−13.7)	−17.7 (0.1)	−8.7 (16.3)	0.9 (33.6)	5.7 (42.3)	1.6 (34.9)	−8.5 (16.7)	−19.1 (−2.4)	−29.1 (−20.4)	−37.1 (−34.8)	−37.1 (−34.8)
Average precipitation mm (inches)	0.6 (0.02)	1.1 (0.04)	2.1 (0.08)	4.0 (0.16)	4.5 (0.18)	13.8 (0.54)	16.0 (0.63)	14.3 (0.56)	5.2 (0.20)	1.4 (0.06)	1.8 (0.07)	1.1 (0.04)	65.9 (2.58)
Average precipitation days (≥ 0.1 mm)	1.5	1.7	2.2	2.1	2.4	5.1	6.3	4.6	2.7	1.4	1.9	1.8	33.7
Average snowy days	3.3	3.3	3.5	2.1	0.7	0	0	0	0.3	1.6	3.5	3.9	22.2
Average relative humidity (%)	54	45	37	31	28	32	36	36	36	39	49	54	40
Mean monthly sunshine hours	238.4	237.7	281.6	304.3	340.6	321.2	319.6	315.9	299.1	287.2	234.1	223.6	3,403.3
Percentage possible sunshine	80	78	75	75	75	71	70	75	81	85	81	79	77
Source: China Meteorological Administration (precipitation days, snow days, sunshine 1991–2020) all-time extreme temperatureNOAA

== Administrative divisions ==
Subei Mongol Autonomous County is divided into two towns and two townships. The county's administrative seat ("capital") is the town of Dangchengwan.

Name	Simplified Chinese	Hanyu Pinyin	Mongolian (Hudum Script)	Mongolian (Cyrillic)	Mongolian (SASM/GNC)	Administrative division code
Towns
Dangchengwan	党城湾镇	Dǎngchéngwān Zhèn	ᠳ᠋ᠠᠩ ᠴᠡᠩ ᠸᠠᠨ ᠪᠠᠯᠭᠠᠰᠤ	Даан цан ван балгас	Daŋ čeŋ van balɣasu	620923100
Mazongshan	马鬃山镇	Mǎzōngshān Zhèn	ᠮᠠᠽᠦ᠋ᠩᠱᠠᠨ ᠪᠠᠯᠭᠠᠰᠤ	Мазуншан балгас	Mazüŋšan balɣasu	620923101
Townships
Xirgaljin Township (Yanchiwan)	盐池湾乡	Yánchíwān Xiāng	ᠱᠢᠷᠭᠠᠯᠵᠢᠨ ᠰᠢᠶᠠᠩ	Шаргалжин шиян	širɣalǰin šiyaŋ	620923201
Shibaocheng Township	石包城乡	Shíbāochéng Xiāng	ᠱᠢᠪᠣᠣᠴᠧᠩ ᠰᠢᠶᠠᠩ	Швацэн шиян	šiboočēŋ šiyaŋ	620923202

== Demographics ==
Historical population
Year	Pop.	±% p.a.
2000	13,046	—
2010	14,979	+1.39%
2020	15,093	+0.08%

Subei is home to Deed Mongols (Upper Mongols) who migrated to the area. In 1996, the Mongol ethnicity population was 37.5% of the county's total population.

Nationality	Population (2000)	Percentage
Han	8,566	65.66%
Mongol	4,112	31.52%
Tibetan	209	1.60%
Hui	86	0.66%
Tu	41	0.31%
Yugur	15	0.12%
Manchu	7	005%
Others	10	0.08%

== Gallery ==
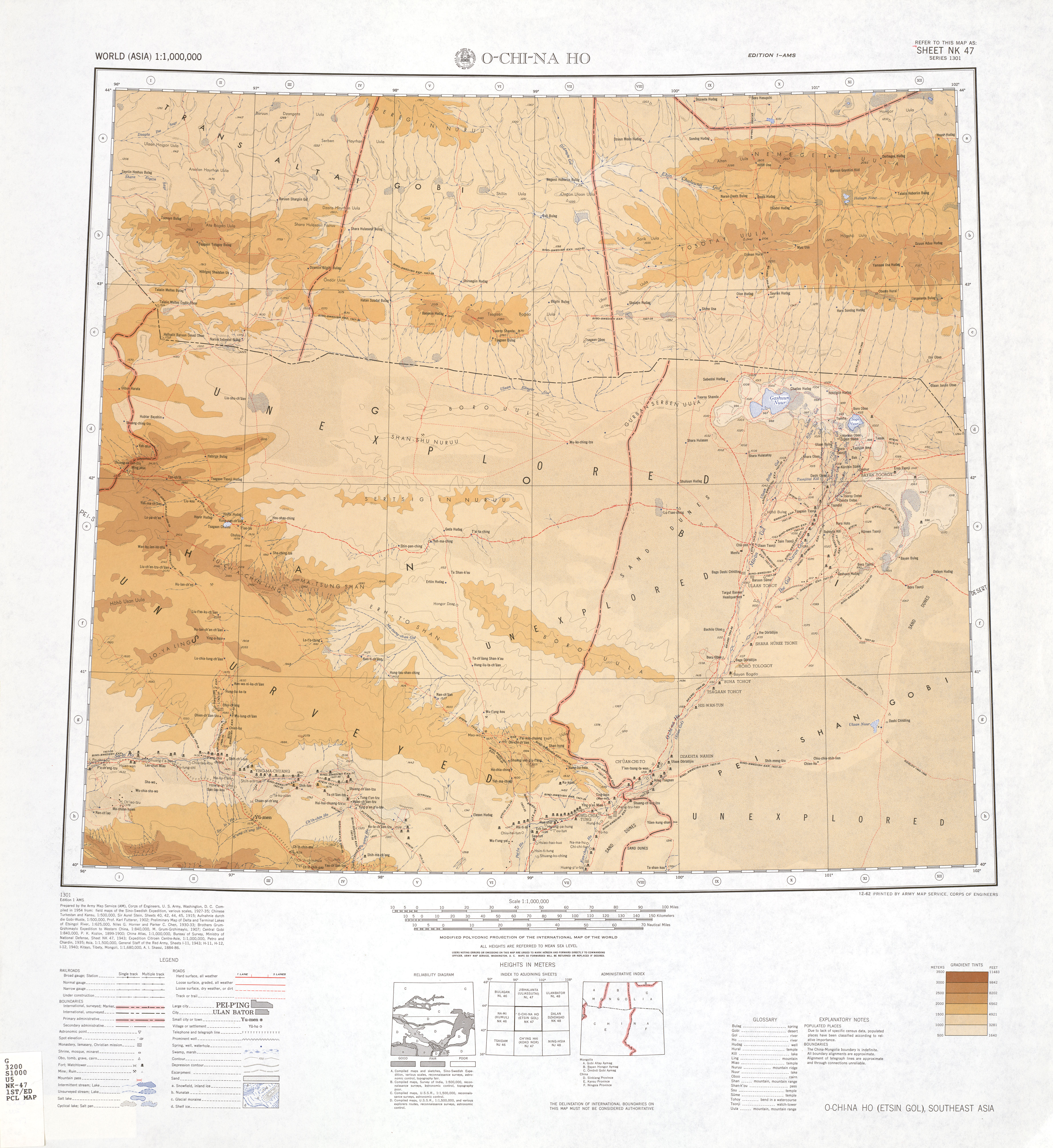
Map including northern Subei County area (1954)

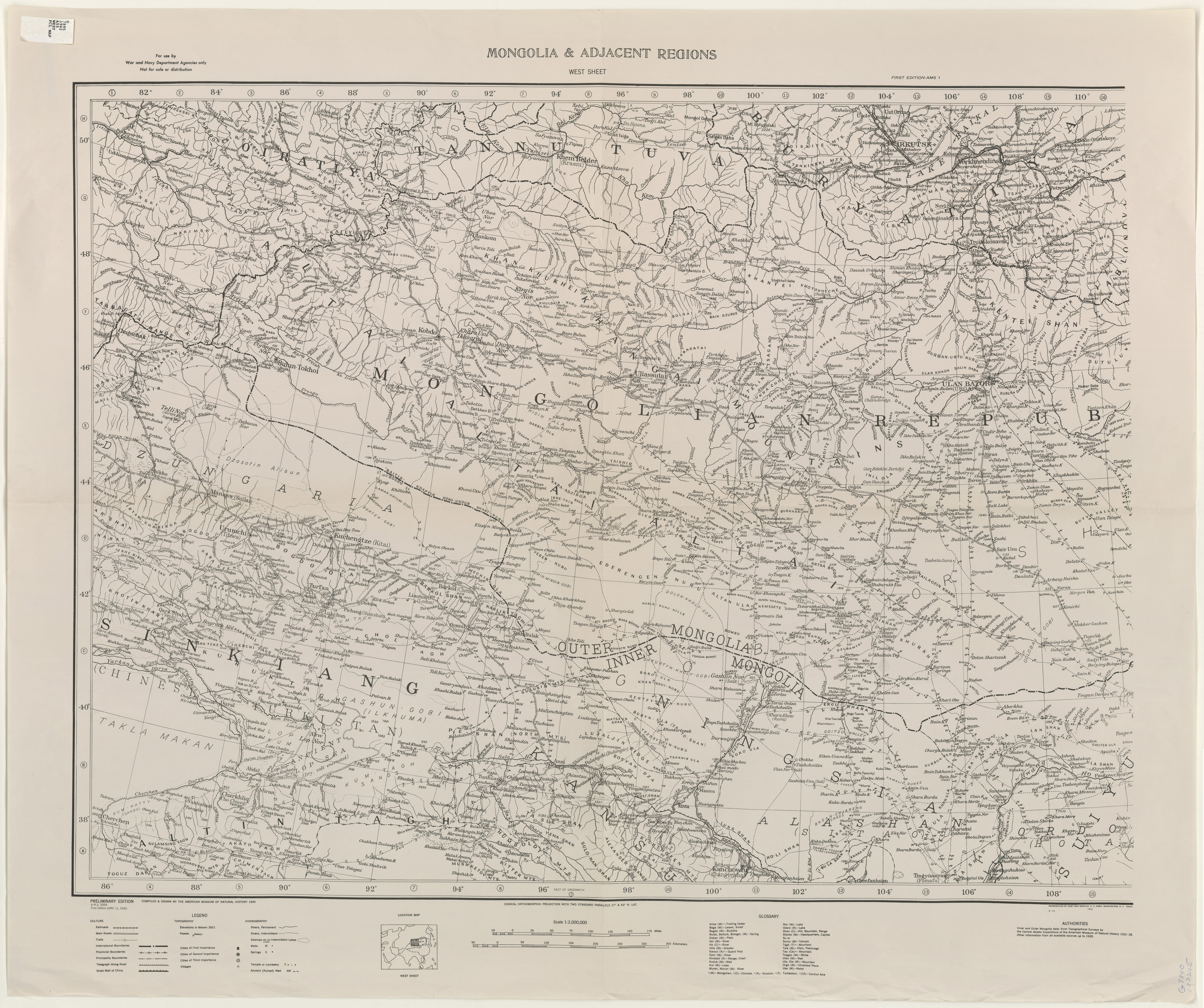
Map including part of the modern Subei Mongol Autonomous County area (1935)
