= Kangze Gyai =

Mountain in China

- Location within Qinghai Location within China

Highest point
- Elevation: 5,826.8 m (19,117 ft)
- Prominence: 2,231 m (7,320 ft)
- Isolation: 359.22 km (223.21 mi)
- Listing: Mountains of China; Ultra
- Coordinates: 38°30′1″N 97°43′29″E

Geography
- Country: China
- Province: Qinghai
- Parent range: Qilian Mountains

Kangze Gyai (Kangze’Gyai; Chinese-Simplified: 团结峰) (Also known as Tuanjie Peak, Tuanjiefeng Peak, Mount Tuanjie, or Gangzewujie) is a mountain located in Qinghai, China. It is the highest peak in the Shulenan Mountain Range of the Qilian Mountains and is an ultra-prominent peak, ranking as the 139^{th} highest in Asia. It has an elevation of 5,826.8 m (19,117 ft)

There have been four ascents with the first being in September 1958 by a large Chinese expedition. Three climbers reached the summit on September 14, and 10 more climbers followed the day after on September 15. The other ascents took place in August 1999, October 2009, and August 2013.

== See also ==
- List of ultras of Tibet, East Asia and neighbouring areas
