= Mazong Mountain =

Mountain in Gansu, China

Coordinates: 41°31′26″N 97°7′10″E

The Mǎzōng Shān (Chinese: 马鬃山; pinyin: Mǎzōng Shān) is a minor mountain range of Subei Mongol Autonomous County, Jiuquan, northern Gansu, China, between the Altay range to the north and the Qilian range to the south. The Mǎzōng Shān peak rises to 2584 m.

== Climate ==
Mount Mazong has a cold desert climate (Köppen climate classification BWk).

Climate data for Mazong Mountain, Subei, elevation 1,770 m (5,810 ft), (1991–2020 normals, extremes 1981-present)
Month	Jan	Feb	Mar	Apr	May	Jun	Jul	Aug	Sep	Oct	Nov	Dec	Year
Record high °C (°F)	14.1 (57.4)	14.5 (58.1)	21.2 (70.2)	28.6 (83.5)	31.3 (88.3)	34.6 (94.3)	36.7 (98.1)	35.2 (95.4)	31.7 (89.1)	26.2 (79.2)	19.5 (67.1)	12.3 (54.1)	36.7 (98.1)
Mean daily maximum °C (°F)	−3.5 (25.7)	0.8 (33.4)	7.2 (45.0)	14.8 (58.6)	20.8 (69.4)	26.1 (79.0)	28.4 (83.1)	26.7 (80.1)	21.0 (69.8)	13.1 (55.6)	4.6 (40.3)	−2.2 (28.0)	13.2 (55.7)
Daily mean °C (°F)	−12.0 (10.4)	−8.0 (17.6)	−1.4 (29.5)	6.7 (44.1)	13.2 (55.8)	19.0 (66.2)	21.4 (70.5)	19.4 (66.9)	12.9 (55.2)	4.4 (39.9)	−3.6 (25.5)	−10.4 (13.3)	5.1 (41.2)
Mean daily minimum °C (°F)	−18.8 (−1.8)	−15.2 (4.6)	−8.8 (16.2)	−1.0 (30.2)	5.2 (41.4)	11.5 (52.7)	14.4 (57.9)	12.3 (54.1)	5.7 (42.3)	−2.6 (27.3)	−9.9 (14.2)	−16.5 (2.3)	−2.0 (28.5)
Record low °C (°F)	−35.4 (−31.7)	−29.5 (−21.1)	−25.4 (−13.7)	−17.7 (0.1)	−8.7 (16.3)	0.9 (33.6)	5.7 (42.3)	1.6 (34.9)	−8.5 (16.7)	−19.1 (−2.4)	−29.1 (−20.4)	−37.1 (−34.8)	−37.1 (−34.8)
Average precipitation mm (inches)	0.6 (0.02)	1.1 (0.04)	2.1 (0.08)	4.0 (0.16)	4.5 (0.18)	13.8 (0.54)	16.0 (0.63)	14.3 (0.56)	5.2 (0.20)	1.4 (0.06)	1.8 (0.07)	1.1 (0.04)	65.9 (2.58)
Average precipitation days (≥ 0.1 mm)	1.5	1.7	2.2	2.1	2.4	5.1	6.3	4.6	2.7	1.4	1.9	1.8	33.7
Average snowy days	3.3	3.3	3.5	2.1	0.7	0	0	0	0.3	1.6	3.5	3.9	22.2
Average relative humidity (%)	54	45	37	31	28	32	36	36	36	39	49	54	40
Mean monthly sunshine hours	238.4	237.7	281.6	304.3	340.6	321.2	319.6	315.9	299.1	287.2	234.1	223.6	3,403.3
Percentage possible sunshine	80	78	75	75	75	71	70	75	81	85	81	79	77
Source: China Meteorological Administration (precipitation days, snow days, sunshine 1991–2020) all-time extreme temperatureNOAA

== Gallery ==
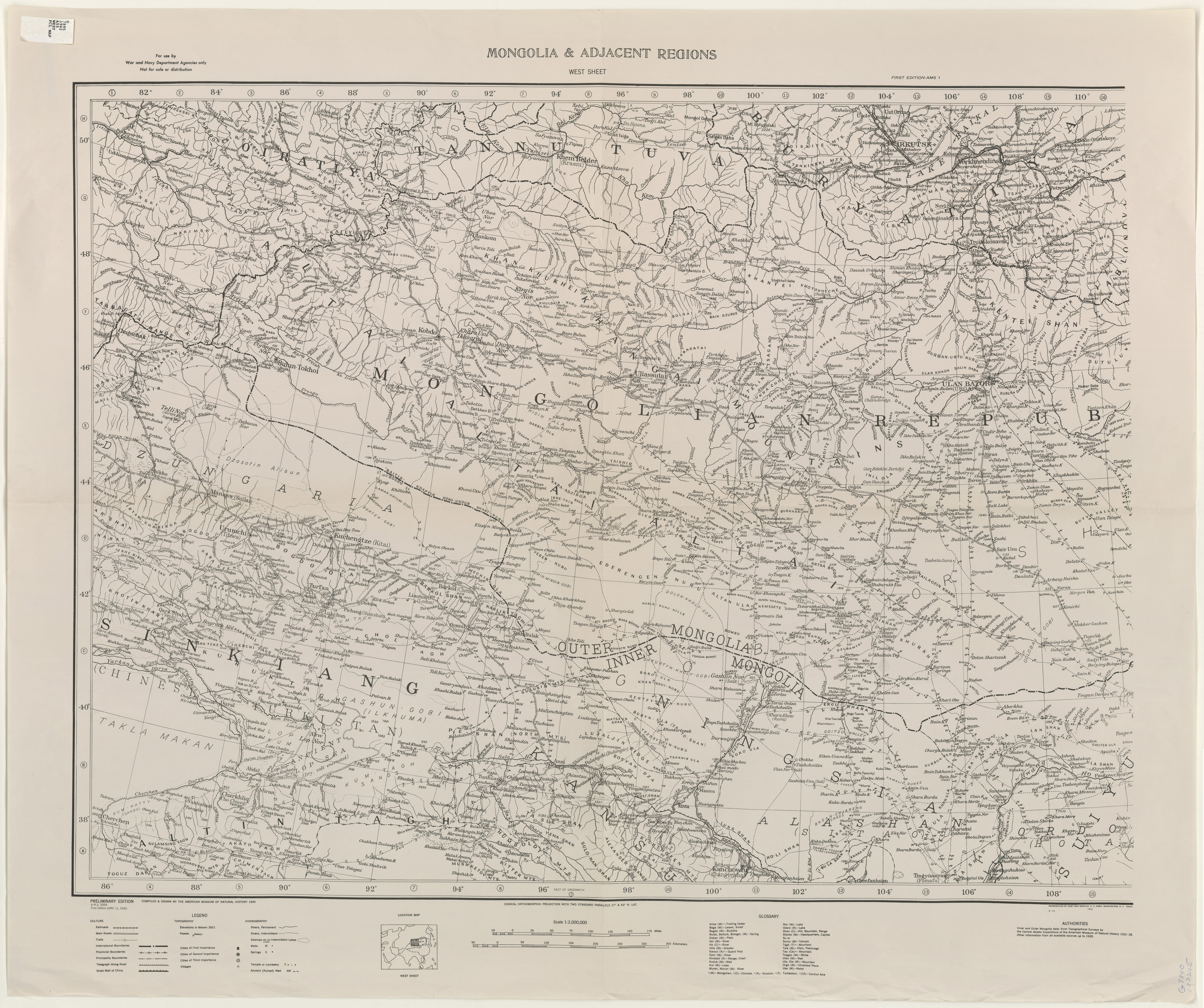
Map including Mazong Mountain (labeled as MATSZUN SHAN) and surrounding areas (1935)

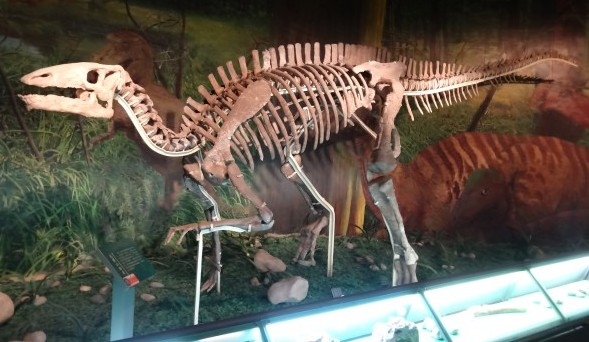
Hadrosauroid Dinosaur skeleton found on (and named for) Mazongshan: Gongpoquansaurus mazongshanensis.

== See also ==
- Equijubus
- Xinminbao Group
