= Hexi Corridor =

Historical region in Gansu Province, China

- 河西走廊
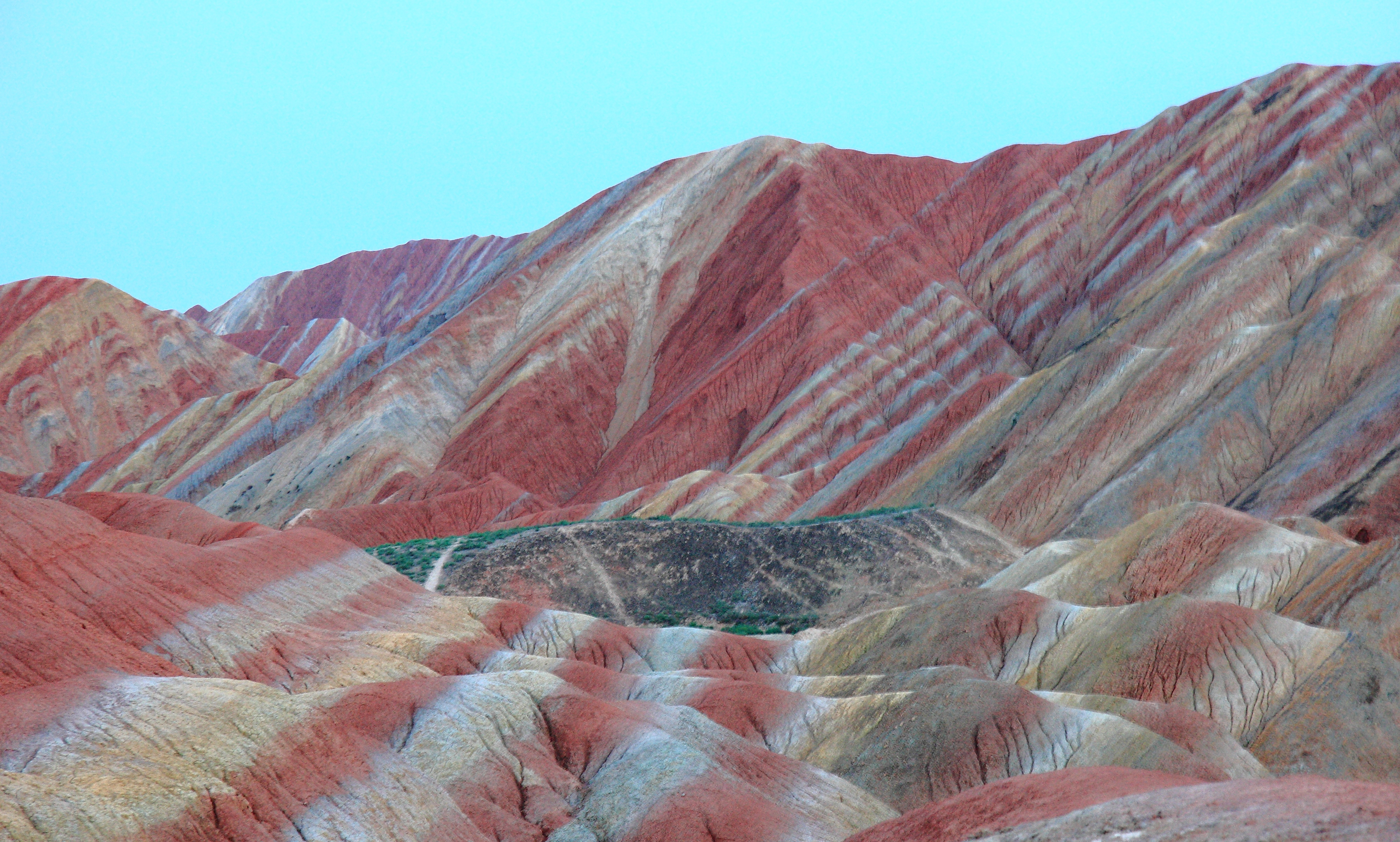
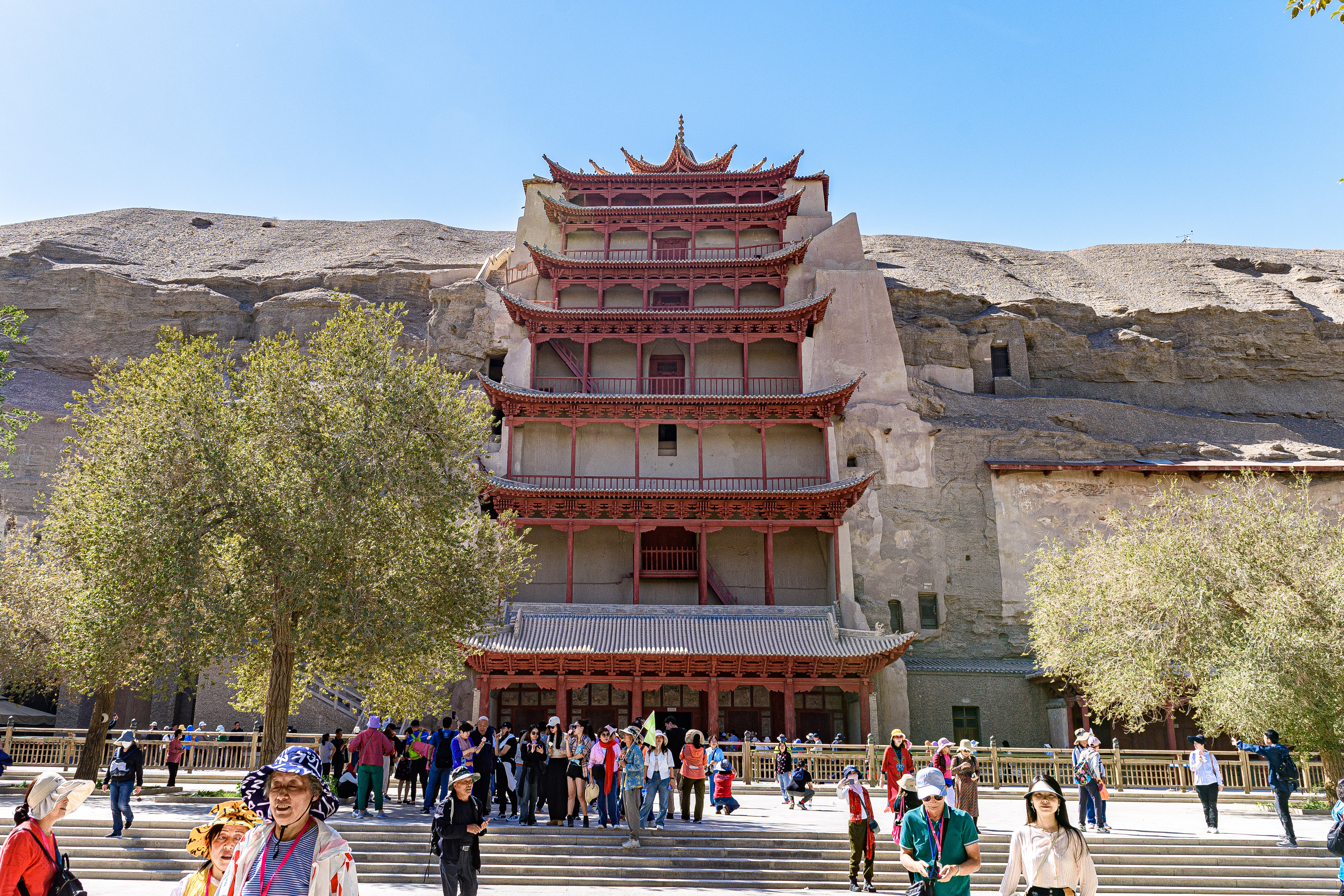
- Zhangye National Geopark A section of the Mogao Caves

- Location within China
- Length: 1,000–1,200 km (620–750 mi)
- Width: 40–100 km (25–62 mi)

Geography
- Population centers: Dunhuang, Yumen City, Jiayuguan City, Jiuquan, Zhangye, Jinchang, Wuwei, and Lanzhou
- Borders on: Gobi Desert (north); Wushao Mountains (east); Qilian Mountains (south); Dunhuang (west)
- Coordinates: 39°00′N 100°00′E

Location
- Interactive map of Hexi Corridor

The Hexi Corridor, (Note: Chinese: 河西走廊; pinyin: Héxī Zǒuláng; Wade–Giles: Ho^{²}-hsi^{¹} Tsou^{³}-lang^{²}; Dungan: Хәщи зулон; Xiao'erjing: حْسِ ظِوْلاْ; Mandarin pronunciation: [xɤ̌ɕí tsòʊlɑ̌ŋ] /həˈʃiː/) also known as the Gansu Corridor, is an important historical region located in the modern western Gansu province of China. It refers to a narrow stretch of traversable and relatively arable plain west of the Yellow River's Ordos Loop (hence the name Hexi, meaning 'west of the river'), flanked between the much more elevated and inhospitable terrains of the Mongolian and Tibetan Plateaus. The Hexi Corridor enabled cultural and agricultural exchange between China and Eurasia for several millennia, in both prehistory and as part of the Northern Silk Road after the Han Dynasty.

As part of the Northern Silk Road, running northwest from the western section of the Ordos Loop between Yinchuan and Lanzhou, the Hexi Corridor was the most important trade route in Northwest China. It linked China proper to the historic Western Regions for traders and military incursions into Central Asia. It is a string of oases along the northern edges of the Qilian Mountains and Altyn-Tagh, with the high and desolate Tibetan Plateau further to the south. To the north are the Longshou, Heli and Mazong Mountains separating it from the arid Badain Jaran Desert, Gobi Desert and the cold steppes of the Mongolian Plateau. At the western end, the route splits into three, going either north of the Tianshan Mountains or south on either side of the Tarim Basin. At the eastern end, the mountains around Lanzhou grants access to the Longxi Basin, which leads east through Mount Long along the Wei River valley into the populous Guanzhong Plain, and then into the Central Plain.

== Geography ==
The Hexi Corridor encompasses much of northwestern Gansu province, and is located on the west side of the Yellow River as it runs north around the Ordos Loop (hence the name Hexi, meaning 'west of the river'). The corridor stretches roughly 1,100 kilometres (680 mi) from the Wushao Mountains in the east to Yumen Pass in the west, 100–200 kilometres (60–100 mi) from north to south, ranges from 40–100 kilometres (20–60 mi) in width, and covers an area of approximately 276,000 square kilometres (107,000 mi^{2}) or around 60% of the area of Gansu Province. Its population was 4.82 million people in 2011, representing around 19% of the province's total population. As of 2024, the corridor contains 20 administrative divisions and five prefecture-level cities, which are, from east to west: Wuwei, Jinchang, Zhangye, Jiuquan, and Jiayuguan.

The elevation of the Hexi Corridor descends from around 1,500 metres (4,900 ft) above sea level in the southeast to 1,000 metres (3,300 ft) in the northwest. It is bordered by the Qilian Mountains in the south and southeast, the Kumtag Desert to the west, the Mazong, Helan, and Longshou Mountains to the north, the Badain Jaran Desert to the northeast, and the Tengger Desert to the southeast. The Qilian Mountains run south of the Hexi Corridor for 600 kilometres (370 mi) and contain several peaks exceeding 4,500 metres (14,800 ft) above sea level, while the mountains to the north generally range from 1,500–2,500 metres (4,900–8,200 ft) in height. The location of the Hexi Corridor between these landforms as a relatively arable and low-lying valley makes it the most convenient route between China and Central Asia.

The three largest rivers in the Hexi Corridor are the Shiyang, Heihe, and Shule rivers. Like most rivers in the region, much of their discharge is derived from the melting of glaciers and snow in the Qilian Mountains; they form extensive alluvial fans and inland drainage basins as they flow through the Hexi Corridor, beyond which lie deserts and large sand-dune fields. Arid landscapes such as deserts comprise roughly 70% of the Hexi Corridor, while fertile land and vegetation are largely confined to oases along the major rivers, which have sustained both nomadic groups and settled societies for thousands of years.

== Geology ==
The Hexi Corridor is a Cenozoic foreland basin formed over millions of years by the uplift, crustal shortening, and northward advance of the Tibetan Plateau, a landform of which the Hexi Corridor forms the northeastern margin. The region is seismically active, having experienced five earthquakes of magnitude 7 or greater since 180 AD, and is dominated by northwest-trending reverse faults. It is internally divided by three uplifts into four depressions filled with thick fluvial and lacustrine sediment deposited during the Quaternary era.

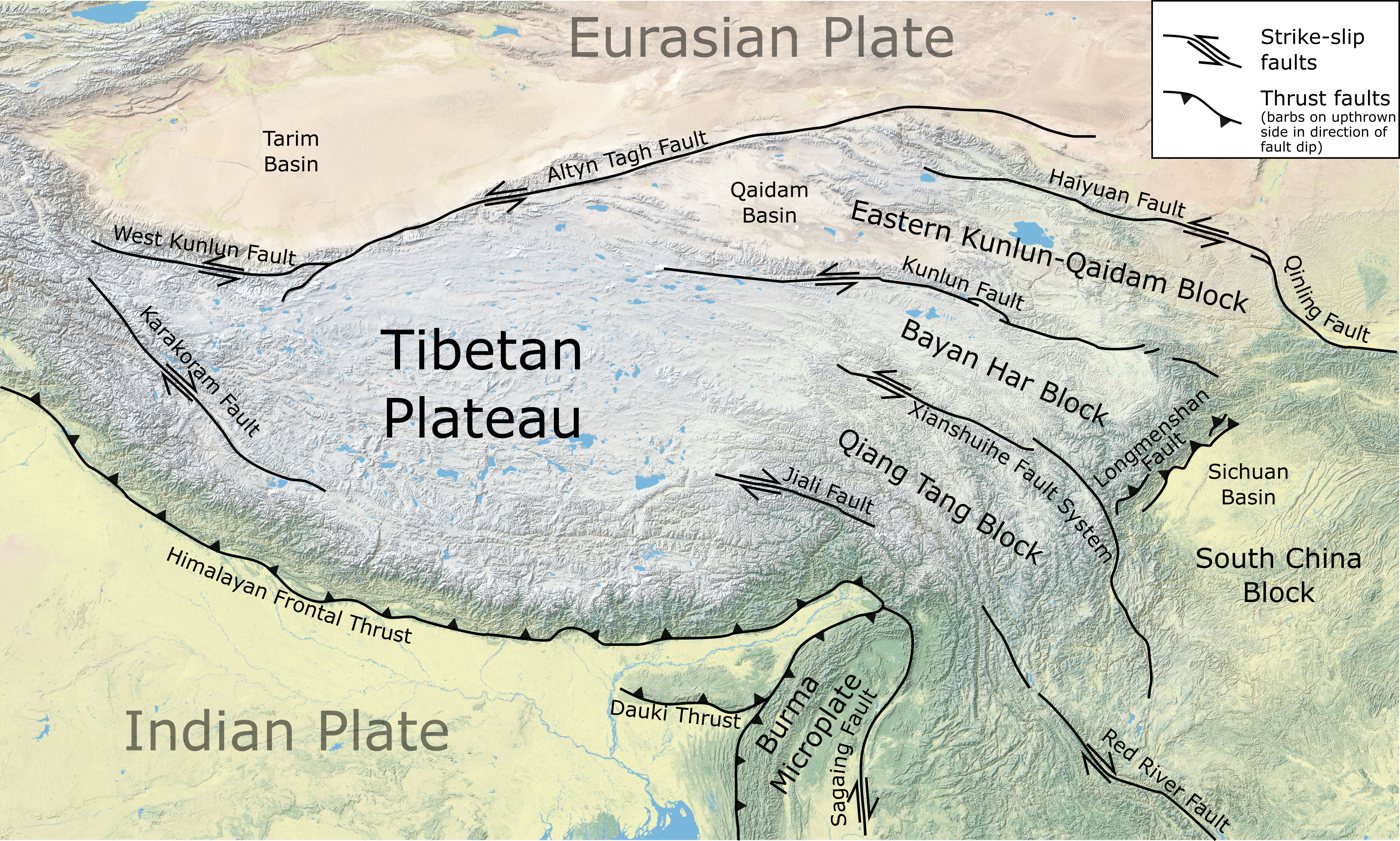
The Altyn Tagh fault formed during the Oligocene and steadily propagated from southwest to northeast, terminating at what is now the Hexi Corridor.

The area of the present-day Hexi Corridor was successively part of various foreland and strike-slip basins throughout the Paleozoic and early to mid-Mesozoic. During the Cretaceous, the region encompassing the Hexi Corridor and Qilian Mountains was lifted above its surroundings and tectonic activity waned, causing the region to be dominated by erosional activity until the early Oligocene.

During the Oligocene, crustal shortening as a result of the India–Eurasia collision and the growth of the Tibetan Plateau caused the down-faulting and subsidence of the Hexi Corridor. As a result, the region likely became the northern margin of a wide basin extending northward from the Kunlun Mountains, interrupted by a low rise roughly 400 kilometres (250 mi) to the south of the Hexi Corridor in the present-day southern Qilian Mountains. Sedimentation in the Hexi Corridor during this time was dominated by fine and highly eroded material derived from this low rise and transported by long meandering streams, with deposition likely occurring in shallow terminal lakes within the basin.

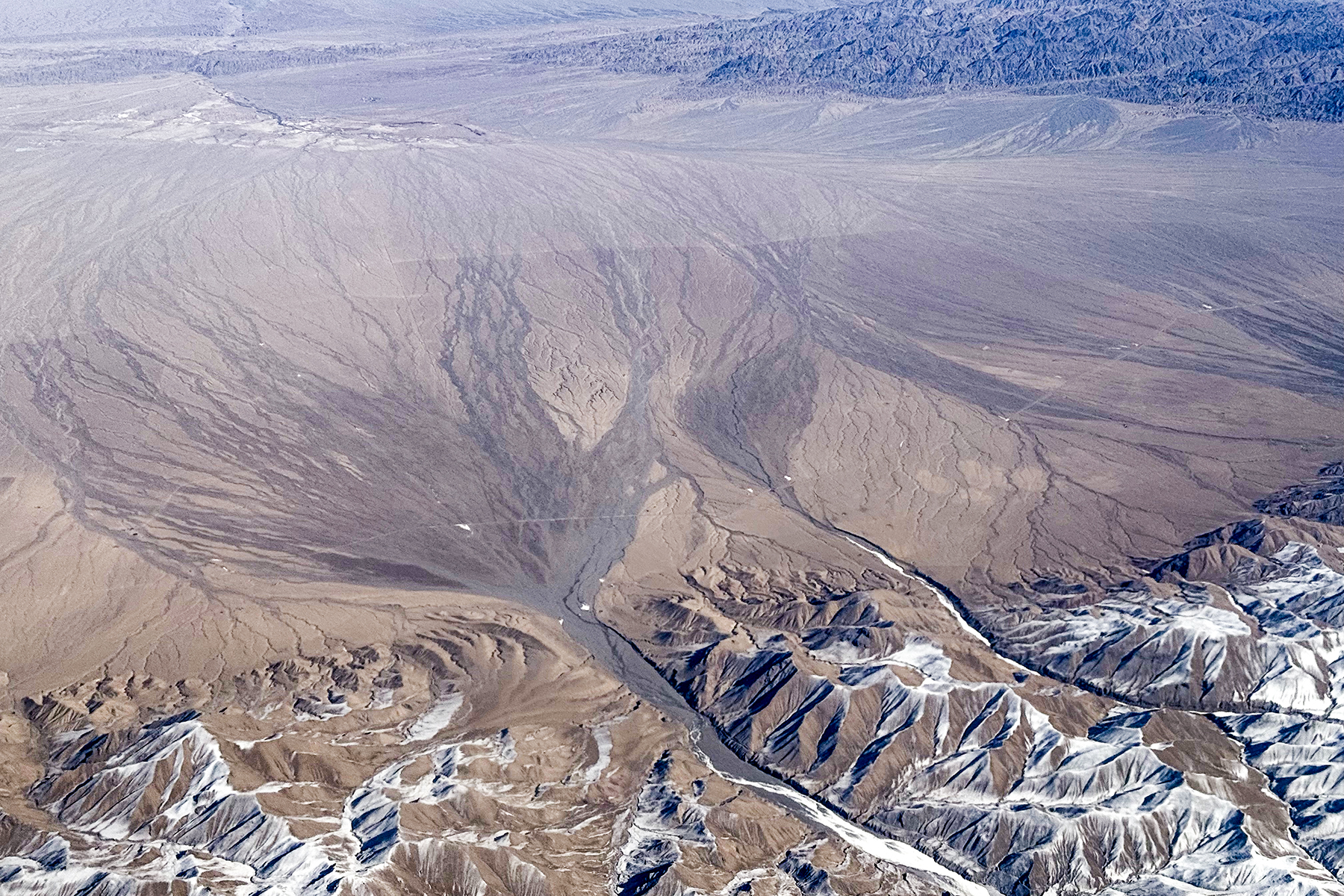
A typical alluvial fan in the Hexi Corridor, formed by meltwater flowing from the Qilian Mountains into the basin. Ongoing uplift of the Qilian Mountains continues to reshape these rivers' fluvial terraces and alluvial fans.

During the Miocene (around 13 million years ago), the northeastward propagation of the Altyn Tagh Fault reached its maximum extent at the Hexi Corridor; subsequent crustal shortening around this new terminus led to the formation of the Qilian Mountains, separating the Qaidam Basin to the south from the Hexi Corridor. During the Pliocene and Pleistocene, crustal shortening spread into the Hexi Corridor itself and formed multiple uplifts. Since the mid-Miocene, deposition in the Hexi Corridor has been dominated by coarse weakly-eroded material owing to the close proximity of the Qilian Mountains and short sediment transport distances.

Sedimentation rates in the Hexi Corridor increased significantly during the early Pleistocene. 1.7 million years ago, the terminal lakes in the Hexi Corridor began to contract as the deltas of rivers prograded into the basin. By 1.1 million years ago, the lakes and former river deltas had disappeared with the formation rivers such as the Heihe and Shiyang, which cut through the former systems by running parallel down the length of the corridor rather than perpendicularly across it. Continued tectonic activity steepened the Qilian Mountains and caused the alluvial fans of many rivers to shift toward the basin's center, converting them into tributaries of the new longitudinal channels.

== Climate ==
Köppen climate classification map of all of Gansu.

The dominant climate types in the Hexi Corridor are temperate semi-arid (Köppen: BSk) and temperate arid (Köppen: BWk). The region experiences an average annual temperature of 4–10 °C (39–50 °F) and an average annual precipitation of less than 200 mm (7.9 in) which generally decreases from southwest to northeast. The climate in the Hexi Corridor is heavily influenced by its location at the intersection of a humid zone in the east dominated by the East Asian monsoon and an arid zone in the west dominated by the westerlies, and has varied over thousands to millions of years as a result of Milankovitch cycles.

Climate fluctuations in the Hexi Corridor have historically played a dominant role in shaping human settlement and interaction in the region. Between the Last Glacial Maximum and the late Holocene, the northern boundary of the East Asian Monsoon migrated at least 300 km (190 mi) northwest of its current location near Zhangye. Further intensification during the middle Holocene led to high lake levels and abundant vegetation, and it was during this time when human settlement first expanded into the Hexi Corridor. From 4000–2000 BP, the East Asian monsoon retreated and the climate became cold and arid, leading to a period of cultural and agricultural decline in the region. Since 2000 BP, the influence of climate variability in the Hexi Corridor has increased; for instance, the abundance of early Han dynasty sites may be attributed to relatively warm and humid conditions at the time, while the Little Ice Age during the Ming to Qing dynasties likely contributed to the decline of the region's sites and the Silk Road.

== Ecology ==
=== Habitats ===
The Hexi Corridor spans three ecoregions, with most of its area lying within the Alashan Plateau semi-desert, while its southern portion extends into the Qilian Mountains subalpine meadows and the Qilian Mountains conifer forests. The region contains 11 provincial-level and 10 national-level nature reserves which collectively occupy 28% of the corridor's land area, including three Ramsar-listed wetlands.

The distribution of habitats across the Hexi Corridor broadly follows a north–south gradient determined by precipitation patterns and the position of the Qilian Mountains, the primary source of water in the corridor. Desert covers around 70% of the region's land area, mostly in the lower-lying regions of the north and west, where it is characterised by saline soil, sparse vegetation dominated by halophytic and xerophilous shrubs, and low biodiversity. More vegetated ecosystems, such as semideserts and steppes, occur along rivers and oases in the lower corridor; while in the south, they appear as the terrain rises past 1,800 metres (5,900 ft) above sea level on hills and mountain slopes. Forests cover just 3.32% of the corridor's total land area and occur above 2,500 metres (8,200 ft) in the Qilian Mountains.

=== Flora ===
Saxual shrubs with nabkha dunes beneath their roots in Guazhou County.

There are 326 recorded species of seed plants in the Hexi Corridor. Most of the Hexi Corridor is covered by Reaumuria soongorica desert rangelands, within which semishrubs like Nitraria tangutorum, Zygophyllum xanthoxylon, and Artemisia ordosica occur; these plants contribute to sand fixation and are thus often found near or upon sand dunes. Dwarf trees such as tamarisk and saxual are also often found in these rangelands, as well as near water accumulation areas such as floodplains and groundwater sources.

Grasses, in particular bunchgrasses, are found in ecosystems with greater water availability in the Hexi Corridor, such as steppes. Species such as Achnatherum splendens occur in the meadows surrounding the major river basins at the foothills of the Qilian Mountains. Further up the mountains, steppes dominated by Stipa gobica and Stipa breviflora occur at 1,400–1,600 metres (4,600–5,200 ft), and 2,000–3,000 metres (6,600–9,800 ft) above sea level, respectively; the latter also appears irregularly in the southeast of the lower corridor. Cleistogenes songorica occurs alongside all of the above, often in association with the shrub Caragana tibetica.

Alpine steppes and other montane ecosystems appear in the Hexi Corridor at elevations past around 3,000 metres (9,800 ft), with vegetation patterns closely resembling those of the rest of the Tibetan Plateau. Stipa purpurea is dominant in this region, occurring alongside shrubs such as shrubby cinquefoil and various rhododendron species (e.g Rhododendron oreodoxa, Rhododendron capitatum) to form open meadows in the mountain's gullies and slopes. Other shrubs that occur in these meadows, such as Caragana jubata and alpine willow (Salix oreophila), also form mosaics with patches of Qinghai spruce and Qilian juniper forest.

== History ==
=== Prehistory ===
The Hexi Corridor has been the site of cultural exchanges across Eurasia since prehistory. It was first settled around 4800 BP in Neolithic times by millet farmers from the Yangshao Culture in the western Loess Plateau, who enabled the spread of millet to Central Asia and the rest of Eurasia and Africa. These farmers also used pottery production techniques from Northern China. Several cultures developed in the Hexi corridor during this time, such as the Majiayao, Banshan, and Machang.

The oldest known bronze object discovered in China, dating to 5000–4500 BP, was unearthed at the Majiayao site. The introduction of copper-smelting technology around 4200 BP marked the beginning of the Bronze Age in the Hexi Corridor, and bronze production reached its peak between 4000 and 3500 BP. Bronze artifacts from the Hexi Corridor dating to this period account for approximately 70 percent of all bronze objects found in China prior to the Shang dynasty. During this time, domesticated livestock were introduced to the region, so local cultures such as the Shajing, Qijia, Xichengyi, Siba, and Shanma developed agricultural economies based on smelting copper, cultivating millet, and herding animals such as sheep, pigs, cattle, and horses.

Wheat and barley from the Fertile Crescent arrived in the Hexi Corridor via Central Asia around 4000 BP, and from there spread into China proper. By around 3700–3500 BP, most likely due increasing aridity caused by the retreat of the East Asian Monsoon, the more drought-resistant wheat and barley had replaced millet as the main staple crop in the Hexi Corridor. Cultures after this time period (such as the Shajing culture) saw a decrease in site numbers and bronze artifacts, and became dominated by nomadic production rather than agriculture.

=== Han dynasty ===
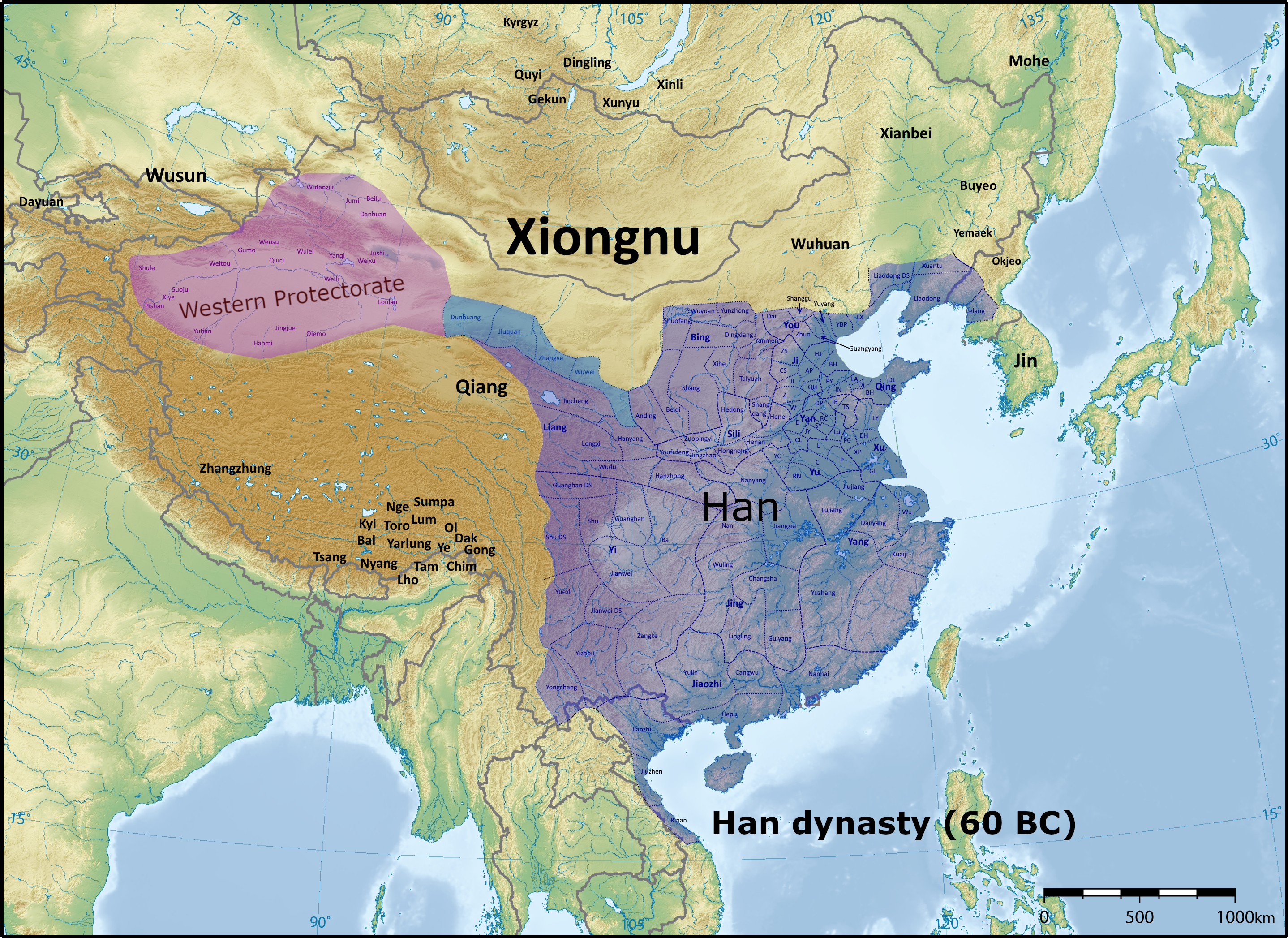
The Han dynasty in 60 BCE Principalities and commanderies Four Commanderies of Hexi Protectorate of the Western Regions

The nomadic Yuezhi resided in the Hexi Corridor in the 3rd century BCE. The Great Wall of China was constructed into parts of the Hexi Corridor following the Qin-Xiongnu Wars, and the defeated Xiongnu formed a confederacy under leader Modu Chanyu. In 176 BCE, the Xiongnu defeated the Yuezhi, most of whom fled from the region while the remaining population moved south into the Qilian Mountains to live with the Qiang. The Xiongnu were subsequently in complete control of the Hexi Corridor.

During the Han-Xiongnu Wars, Han dynasty general Huo Qubing expelled the Xiongnu from the Hexi Corridor at the Battle of Hexi (121 BCE). The province of Liangzhou was created with its capital at Guzang (modern Wuwei City), within which the commanderies of Wuwei, Zhangye, Jiuquan and Dunhuang (the Four Commanderies of Hexi) were established. This gave the Han dynasty control over major trade routes to Central Asia, setting the foundations for the Silk Road. Agricultural garrison towns were established in the Hexi Corridor to secure the route and the Great Wall was extended to Yumen Pass 80 kilometres (50 mi) west of Dunhuang. The Han dynasty's acquisition of the Hexi Corridor allowed them to conquer the Tarim Basin and establish the Protectorate of the Western Regions in 60 BCE, and proved instrumental in defeating the Xiongnu as it prevented contact between them and the Qiang.

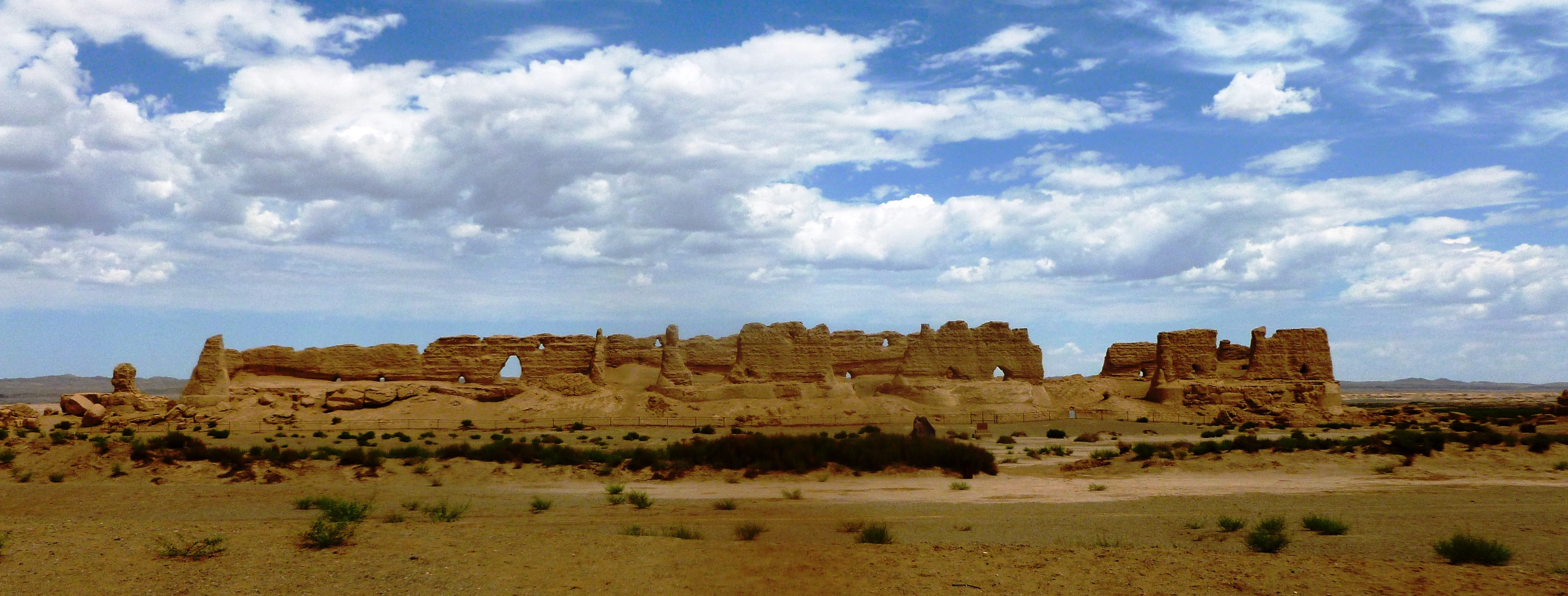
Ruins of the Big Fangpan Castle at Yumen Pass, the western end of the Han-era Great Wall.

Following the collapse of the interregnum Xin dynasty in 23 CE, the Hexi Corridor was settled by large numbers of Qiang people and came under the control of warlord Dou Rong, who submitted to the reinstated Eastern Han dynasty in 29 CE. In the 2nd century CE, millions of Han settlers withdrew from the Hexi Corridor when the Qiang began to raid the region. The Yuezhi, Xiongnu, and Qiang instigated the Liangzhou Rebellion in 184, which largely isolated the Hexi Corridor from central control and contributed to the fall of the Han dynasty. By the end of the Han dynasty, the Hexi Corridor was occupied by warlords Han Sui, Ma Teng and Ma Chao. In 214, Cao Cao conquered the region and incorporated it into his state of Cao Wei.

=== Six Dynasties and Sixteen Kingdoms ===
Timeline of the Sixteen Kingdoms.

Cao Cao's son Cao Pi of Wei deposed the Han dynasty in 220, marking the start of the Three Kingdoms era. In 230, rival Three Kingdoms state Shu Han attacked the Hexi Corridor as part of Zhuge Liang's Northern Expeditions. In 266, Cao Wei became the Jin dynasty, which inherited the Hexi Corridor. In 270, the Xianbei, related to the Xiongnu, began a rebellion in the region which lasted until 279. Starting in the late 3rd century, groups such as the Kushans (descended from the Yuezhi) and Sogdians established a widespread presence in the Hexi Corridor as merchants along the Silk Road. These groups contributed significantly to the spread of belief systems such as Buddhism into the Hexi Corridor.

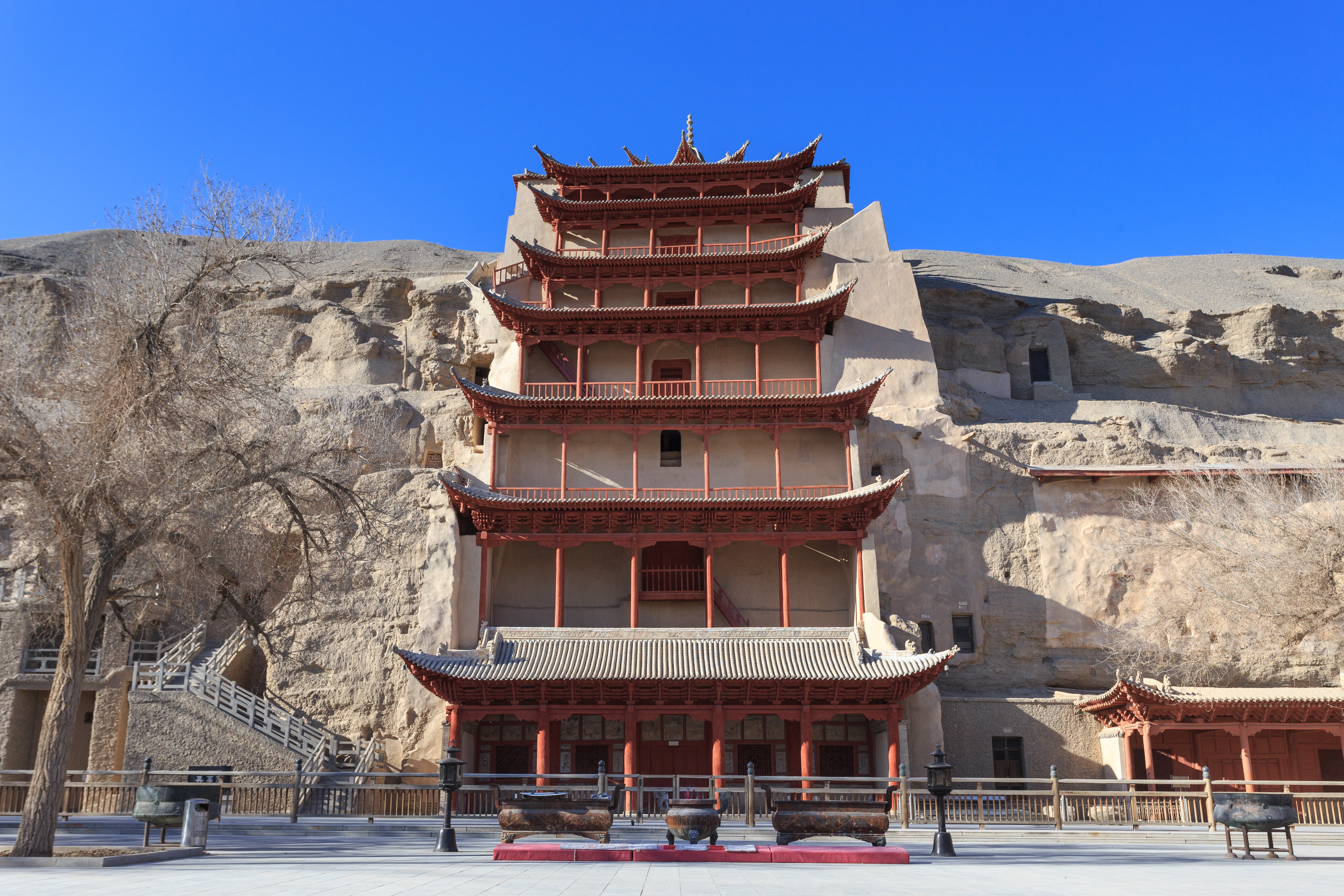
Cave 96 at the Mogao Caves, near Dunhuang.

The state of Former Liang was founded in the Hexi Corridor in the early 4th century, and became the longest-lasting and most politically stable of the Sixteen Kingdoms. In 376, Former Liang was conquered by Former Qin; various parts of the Hexi Corridor then came under the control of Later Liang in 386, Southern and Northern Liang in 397, and Western Liang in 400, before reunifying under Northern Liang in 421. During this period, the Hexi Corridor was spared from much of the turmoil of the Central China Plains, which caused increased migration to the region and led to it becoming a centre of culture in China. Buddhist activity and culture flourished in the Hexi Corridor with the construction of the Mogao Caves around this time, and the accompanying creation and translation of Buddhist literature contributed directly to the religion's adoption in the rest of China.

In 439, Northern Wei conquered Northern Liang and ended the Sixteen Kingdoms era, though the final Northern Liang stronghold at Dunhuang remained until 442. A garrison was then established at Dunhuang to defend against the Rouran and significant numbers of civilians were moved from the Hexi Corridor to the Wei capital at Pingcheng, promoting the readoption of classical Chinese culture and spread of Buddhism in the Central Plains. In the 470s, the Northern Wei government considered abandoning the Hexi Corridor due to repeated raids by the Rouran. They later defeated the Rouran in 492, although the region remained largely desolate into the early 6th century. After the fall of Northern Wei, the Hexi Corridor came into the control of Western Wei in 535, which became Northern Zhou in 557.

=== Medieval history ===
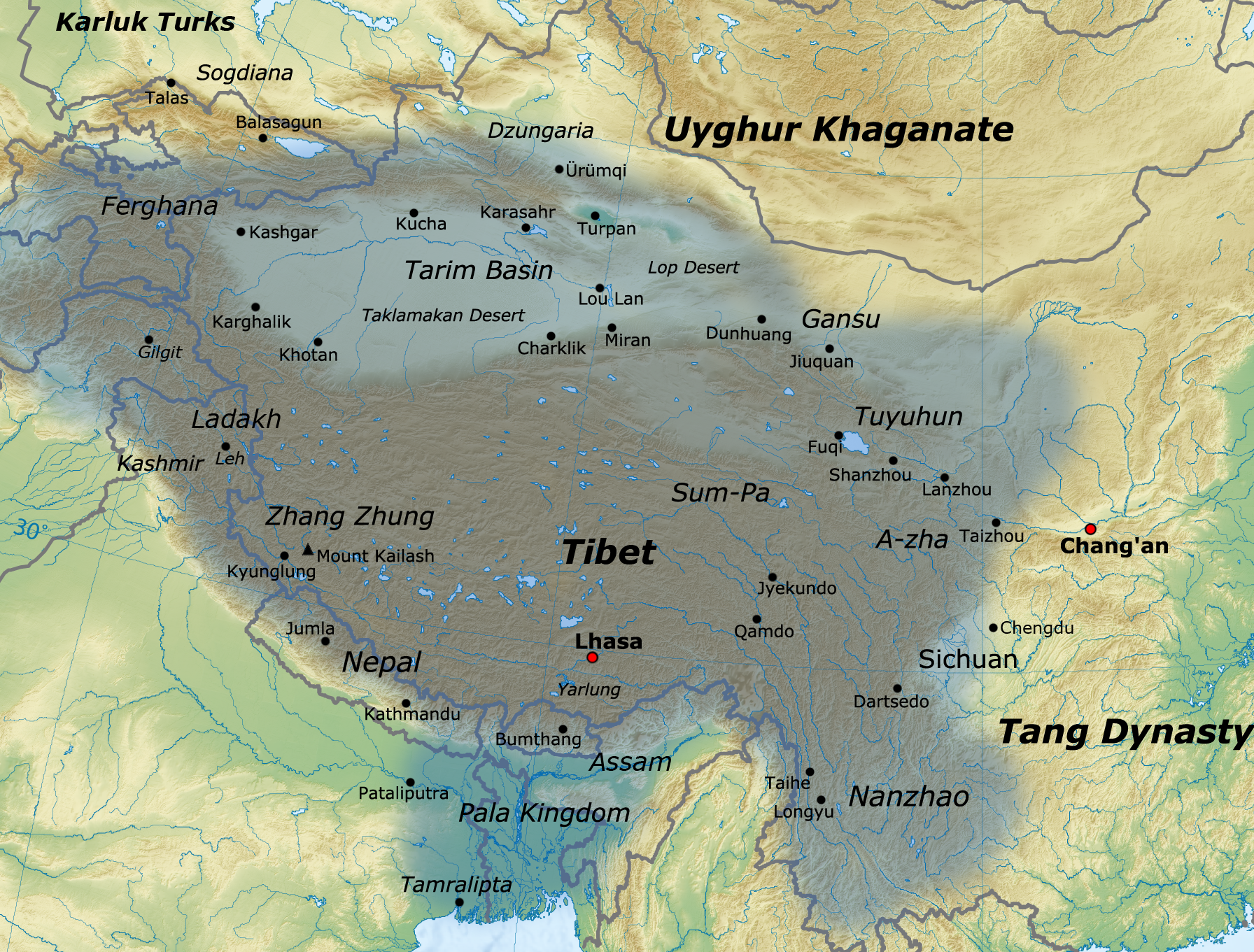
A map showing the Tibetan Empire in the 780s, with the Hexi Corridor under its control.

In 581, Northern Zhou became the Sui dynasty, which in 589 reunited China Proper for the first time in three centuries. In 609, Emperor Yang of Sui toured the Hexi Corridor and personally commanded an expedition against the Tuyuhun to protect the region's trade routes. Warlord Li Gui seized control of the Hexi Corridor in 617 and proclaimed himself ruler of Liang, which was conquered by the newly-founded Tang dynasty in 619. In 627, Buddhist monk Xuanzang passed through the Hexi Corridor on his way to India.

Between 630 and 657, the Tang dynasty conquered territories from several Central Asian states to secure the Hexi Corridor and consolidate control over the Silk Road. The subsequent stability encouraged trade and cultural exchange; religions such as Zoroastrianism, Nestorian Christianity, and Islam spread through the region into central China, and cities in the Hexi Corridor became increasingly cosmopolitan. This expansion also brought the Tang into conflict with the Tibetan Empire, which began encroaching on the Hexi Corridor around 670. In 711, the Hexi Corridor was organised under a military governor (jiedushi) as one of nine frontier commands of the Tang dynasty, which by 742 possessed a quarter of all horses in the empire and represented its third-largest military force.

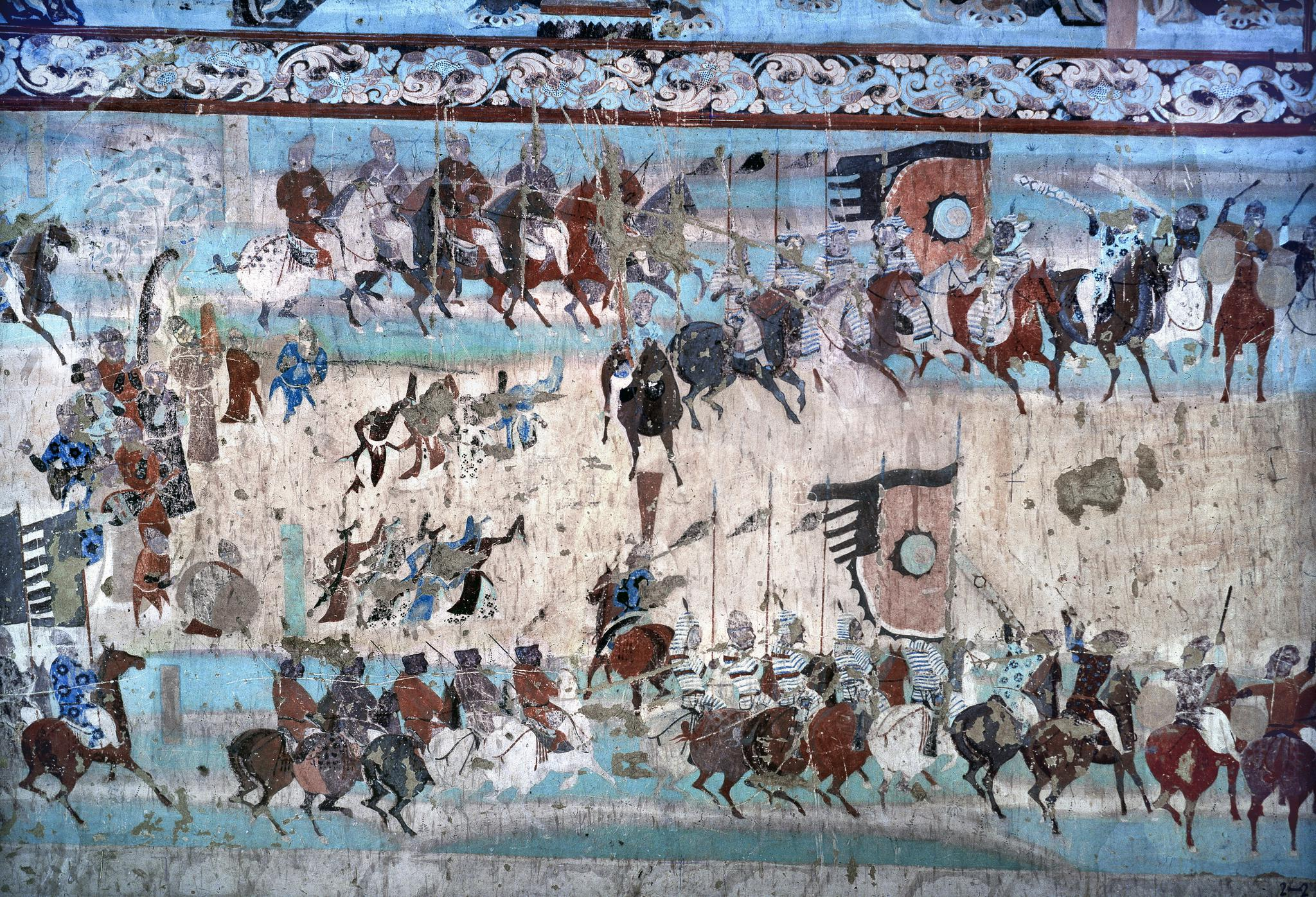
One of several murals at the Mogao Caves commissioned by general Zhang Yichao's successors depicting his victory over Tibetan forces.

Tang forces were withdrawn from the Hexi Corridor following the outbreak of the An Lushan Rebellion in 755 and the Tibetan Empire gradually occupied the region, culminating in their capture of Dunhuang in 786 and the rest of the Hexi Corridor in the 790s. Following this, residents of the region adopted various Tibetan customs such as the use of Tibetan names and the Tibetan script, which continued even after the Tang dynasty reasserted control. Tibetan influence in the Hexi Corridor during this period led to the spread of Tibetan Buddhist culture to the rest of Eurasia, where it remained dominant into the early 20th century.

The Tibetan Empire collapsed in 842; the Hexi Corridor was then seized by warlord Zhang Yichao in 848, who established the Tang-loyal Guiyi Circuit in 851. The Guiyi Circuit reunified the Hexi Corridor and reached its greatest extent in the 860s. Its power and territory then steadily declined under pressure from two Uyghur states: the Qocho Kingdom in the Tarim Basin to the west, and later the Ganzhou Uyghur Kingdom to the east which was founded after the Guiyi Circuit lost control of its eastern provinces in the 880s.

By the early 10th century, the Guiyi Circuit was confined to the area surrounding Dunhuang and was almost completely isolated from the rest of China by the Ganzhou Uyghurs' seizure of goods along the Silk Road. In 911, the Guiyi Circuit became a vassal of the Ganzhou Uyghurs, who reopened the Silk Road in 925. After this, Dunhuang once again became a centre of culture in the region; some of the largest temples at the Mogao Caves were constructed during this time, and Buddhist texts produced at Dunhuang were freely distributed to the Ganzhou and Qocho kingdoms. This revival was partly driven and financed by the diplomatic relations that the three states maintained with one another and with the dominant dynasties of the Central Plains.

=== Western Xia dynasty and Mongol rule ===
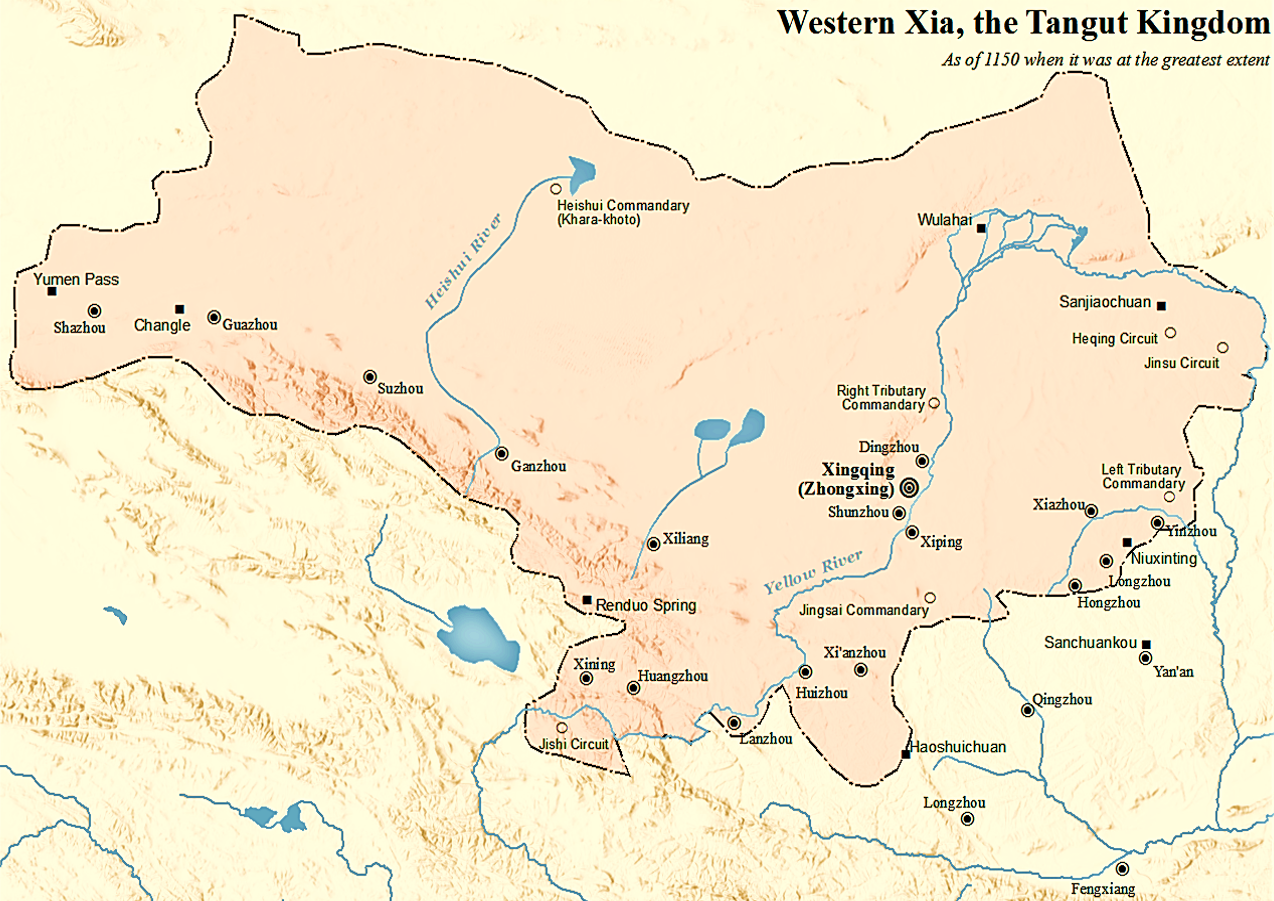
The Western Xia dynasty at its greatest extent around 1150.

The timeline of the Hexi Corridor's conquest by the Tangut-led Western Xia dynasty remains somewhat unclear, with Western Xia likely beginning its invasion in 1028 and completing the conquest in 1036. However, a state (possibly the Guiyi Circuit or a Uyghur kingdom) in the vicinity of Dunhuang may have remained independent until at least 1052, though it is known that Western Xia controlled the entire region by the 1070s. After the conquest of the Hexi Corridor, large numbers of its civilians were mobilized for campaigns against the Song dynasty and local trade routes were increasingly bypassed by merchants, leading to a decline in the region's cultural and economic prominence.

In 1205, the Mongol Empire under Genghis Khan plundered the Hexi Corridor in the first of their attacks on Western Xia; this was followed in 1209 by a full-scale invasion launched through the corridor which led to Western Xia's submission as a vassal in 1210. Genghis Khan invaded once again in 1225, conquering the entire Hexi Corridor in 1226 and the rest of Western Xia in 1227, the year of his death.

Sometime between 1271 and 1275 (shortly after the establishment of the Mongol Yuan dynasty), Marco Polo travelled through the Hexi Corridor on his way to Xanadu, and recorded sights such as the giant reclining Buddha statue at Zhangye and the region's yaks.

=== Ming and Qing dynasties ===
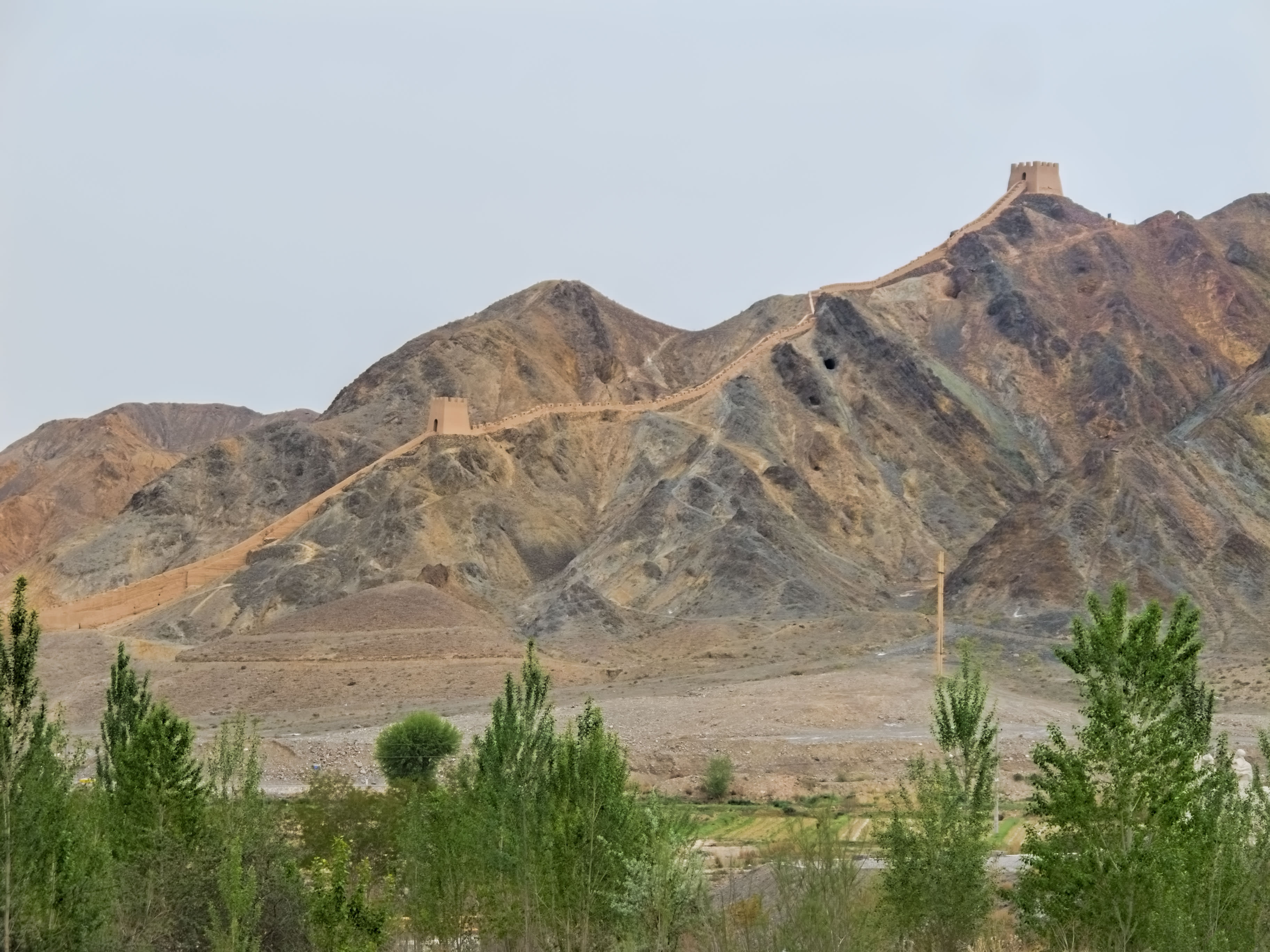
The Great Wall east of Jiayu Pass, constructed 1539–1541 during the Ming dynasty.

In 1370, the newly-established Ming dynasty seized the eastern section of the Hexi Corridor from the Mongols and captured most of the remaining territory in 1372. Later that same year, they constructed Jiayu Pass 15 kilometres (9 mi) east of Dunhuang, which left the city under the control of the Northern Yuan dynasty and led to it largely being abandoned. By this point, the Hexi Corridor had largely lost its importance as a major trade route.

Like the Han dynasty over a millennium prior, the Ming dynasty established garrison towns along the frontier shortly after their conquest of the region. In 1524, Jiayu Pass was closed and Dunhuang was occupied by the Turfan Khanate. The Ming dynasty rebuilt the Great Wall through the Hexi Corridor from 1539–1541 and added an extension in 1573.

In 1644 during the Ming-Qing transition, the Hexi Corridor was briefly seized by the short-lived Shun dynasty until forces of the Qing dynasty under general Ajige defeated them in 1645. In 1648, Muslim rebels led by Milayin occupied most of Gansu and retreated west to the Hexi Corridor in June of that year, where the rebels held out against Qing generals Meng Qiaofang and Zhang Yong in the cities of Ganzhou (Zhangye) and Suzhou (Jiuquan) until 1649. After the Qing victory, 5,000 rebels were executed and Muslims in the Hexi Corridor were resettled away from major cities. Between 1674 and 1676, the Hexi Corridor was isolated from the rest of the Qing dynasty during the Revolt of the Three Feudatories, in which Zhang Yong and his lieutenants played a major role in its suppression.

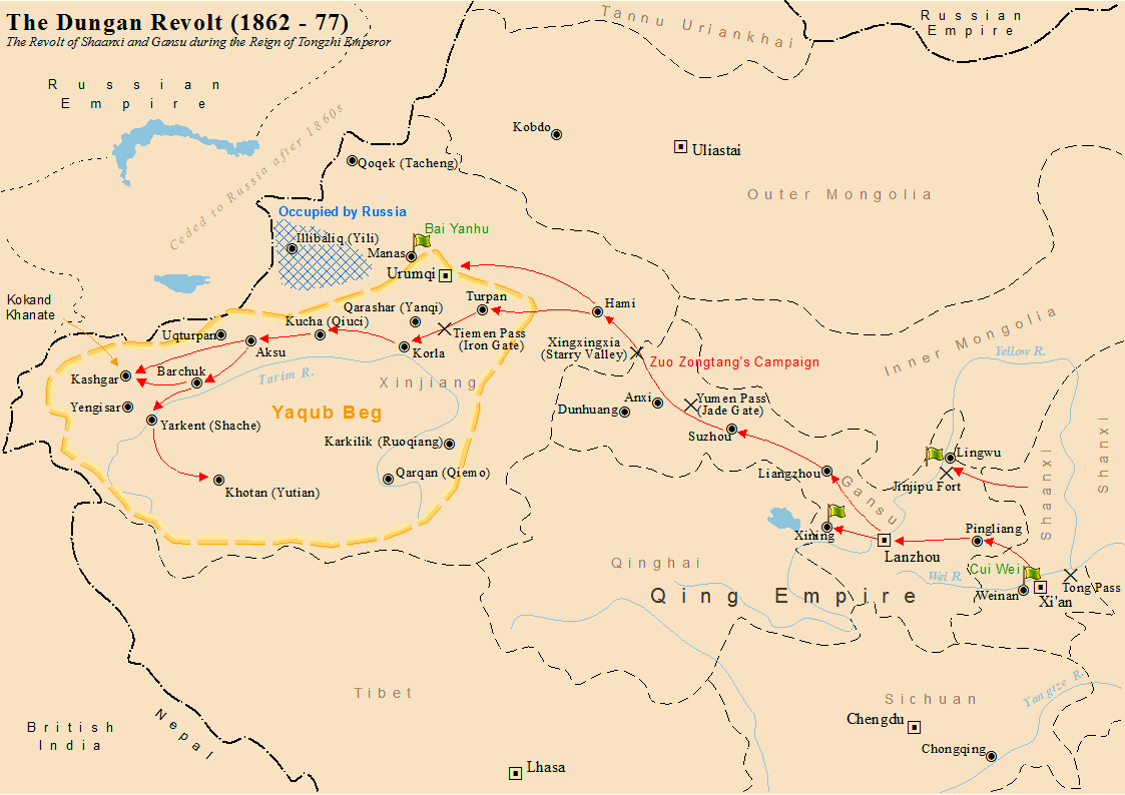
A map of Zuo Zongtang's military campaign against the Dungan Revolt.

Thousands of soldiers and farmers were settled in the Hexi Corridor to cultivate the land in the 1720s as part of a defensive system designed to isolate the Dzungar Khanate from Kokonor (Qinghai), where a Dzungar uprising had been quelled. By the 1750s, yields of millet and wheat, the region's two main crops, had become so high that the Qing dynasty frequently redistributed its harvest across the empire to stabilize grain prices and alleviate famines.

Most of the Hexi Corridor fell to Muslim rebels in 1865 during the Dungan Revolt, which triggered further revolts in Xinjiang. In 1873, General Zuo Zongtang laid siege to Jiuquan with 15,000 soldiers, and attacked its walls with siege guns and explosives. More than 7,000 Muslims were executed after the city's capture, and the remaining Muslims in the Hexi Corridor were resettled to southeastern Gansu to prevent future collaboration with Muslims in Xinjiang.

In 1907, archaeologist Aurel Stein explored the Hexi Corridor, where he rediscovered treasures such as the Mogao Caves and a collection of ancient Sogdian letters in Dunhuang.

=== Modern era ===
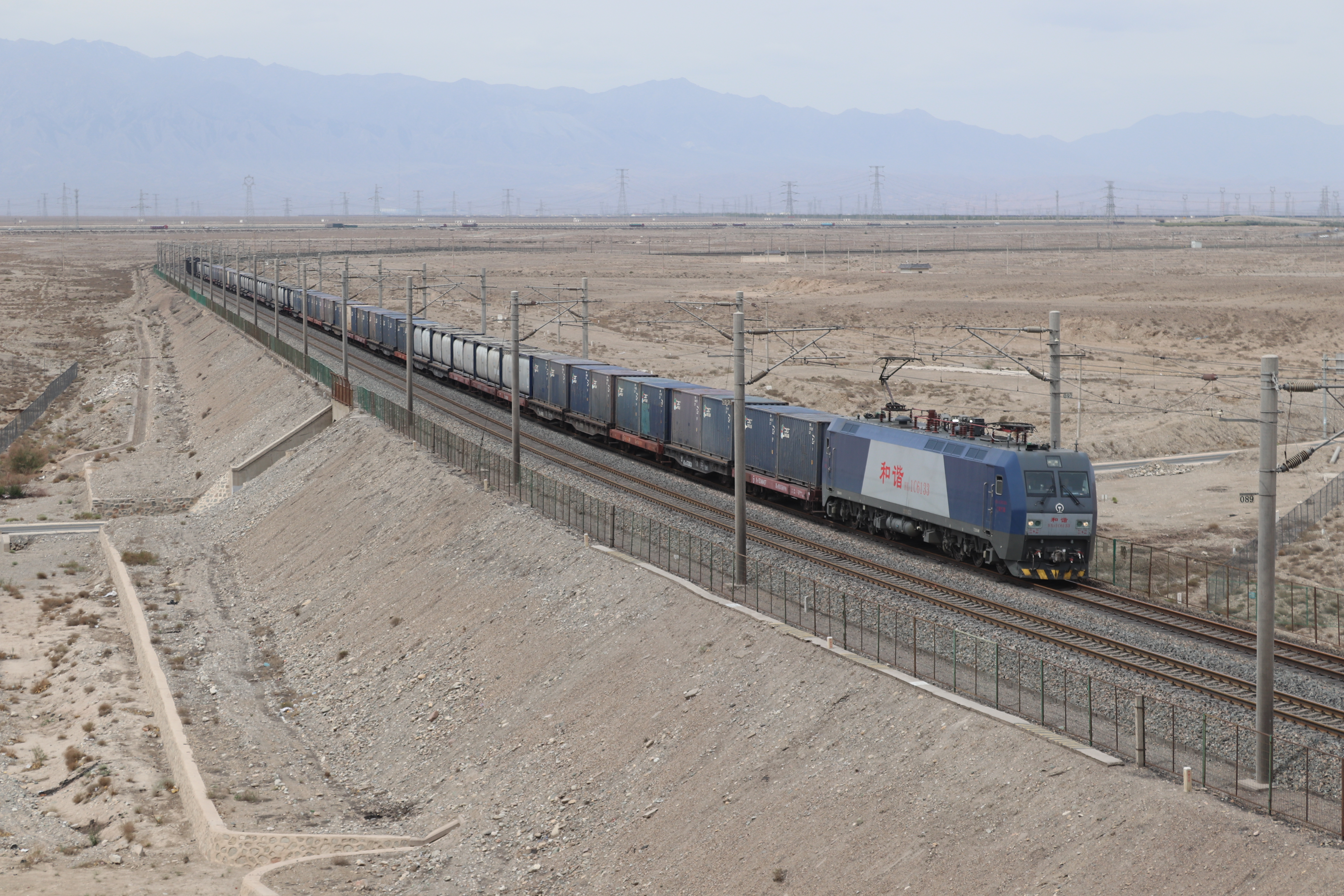
The Lanzhou–Xinjiang railway near Jiayuguan City.

The Hexi Corridor, along with the rest of Gansu, was seized by Hui Muslim warlords in 1911 following the collapse of the Qing dynasty and the onset of the Warlord Era. These warlords established the Ma clique, which declared its allegiance to the Kuomintang government in 1927. A highway was constructed through the corridor during the Second Sino-Japanese War to transport supplies from the USSR. In August 1949, Gansu was captured by the People's Liberation Army during the final stages of the Chinese Civil War.

The Lanzhou–Xinjiang railway, which runs through the Hexi Corridor, began construction in 1952 and opened in 1963. In 1987, the Mogao Caves were listed as a UNESCO World Heritage Site. The Lanzhou–Xinjiang high-speed railway, also passing through the Hexi Corridor, began construction in 2009 and opened in 2014. In 2025, the Chinese government announced a plan to construct a 1,000 km (620 mi) "national heritage route" along the Hexi Corridor which is expected to be complete by 2035.

== See also ==
- Dong Zhuo, a late Han dynasty warlord from the Hexi Corridor
- Silk Road transmission of Buddhism
- Strait of Malacca, a trade corridor that historically enabled cultural exchange
- Qaidam Basin, a relatively low-lying basin on the northern Tibetan Plateau
- Wakhan Corridor, a historically important geopolitical corridor
