= Lake Hala =

Lake in Qinghai, China

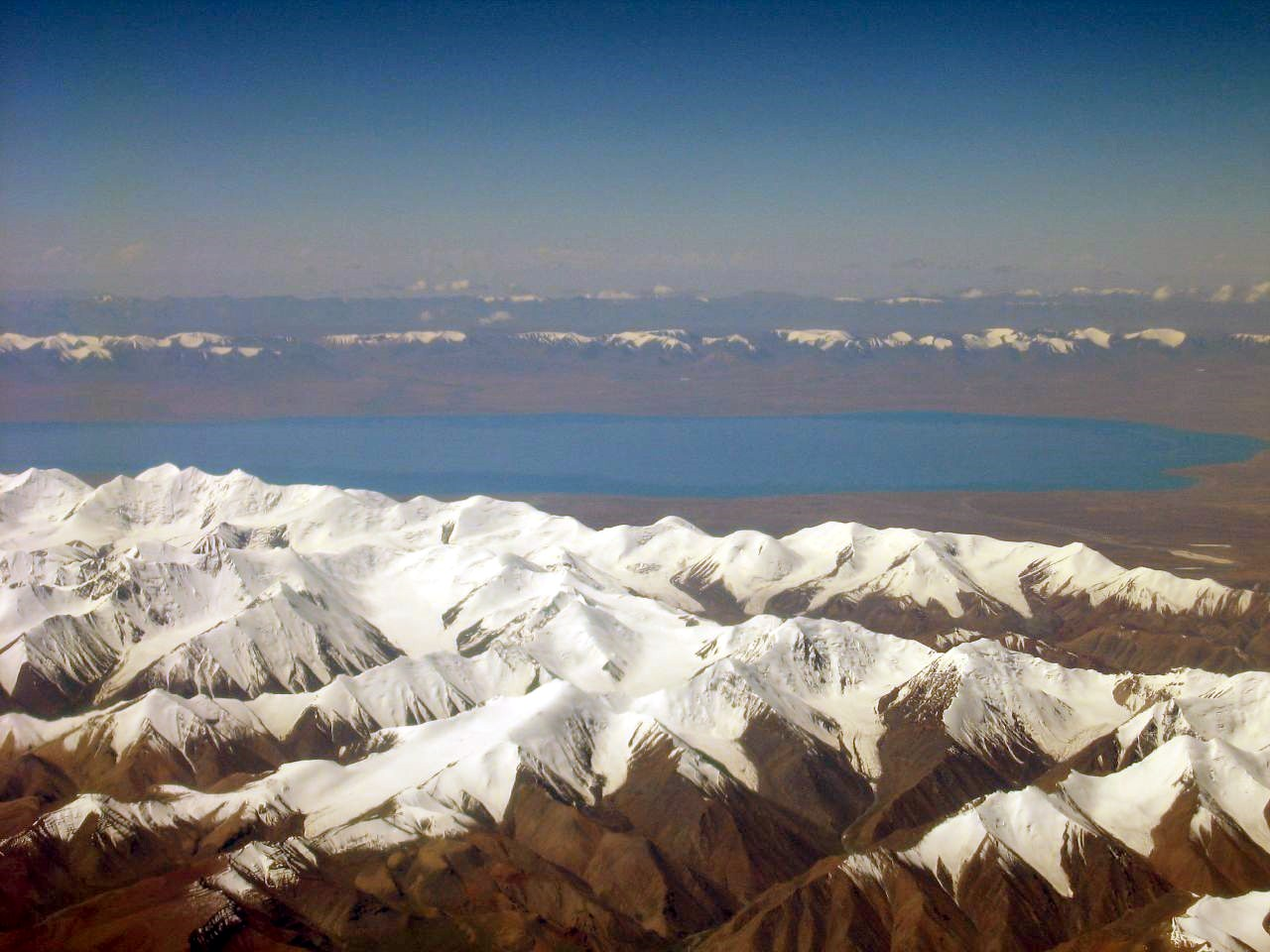
- Lake Hala in the Qilian Shan

- Location within Qinghai
- Location: Haixi Mongol and Tibetan Autonomous Prefecture, Qinghai
- Coordinates: 38°18′N 97°36′E
- Surface area: 596 km^{2} (230 sq mi)
- Max. depth: 65 m (213 ft)
- Surface elevation: 4,078 m (13,379 ft)

Lake Hala (also: Hala Hu, Har Hu), is a closed lake located at 4078m above sea level in the Qilian mountains, at the northeastern margin of the Tibetan Plateau, Qinghai Province, China.

Its surface area is 596 km^{2}. It is a brackish lake with a salinity of ca 1.8% (18 psu). The shore zone is relatively shallow, while the maximum depth at the center of the lake is 65 m. The lake catchment is a basin of 4690 km^{2} without an outflow. The highest surrounding mountains (Shule Nanshan north of the lake), exceed 5800 m above sea level.

Due to the influence of the surrounding glaciers, the water level of the lake and its ecosystem reacts sensitively to meltwater pulses.
