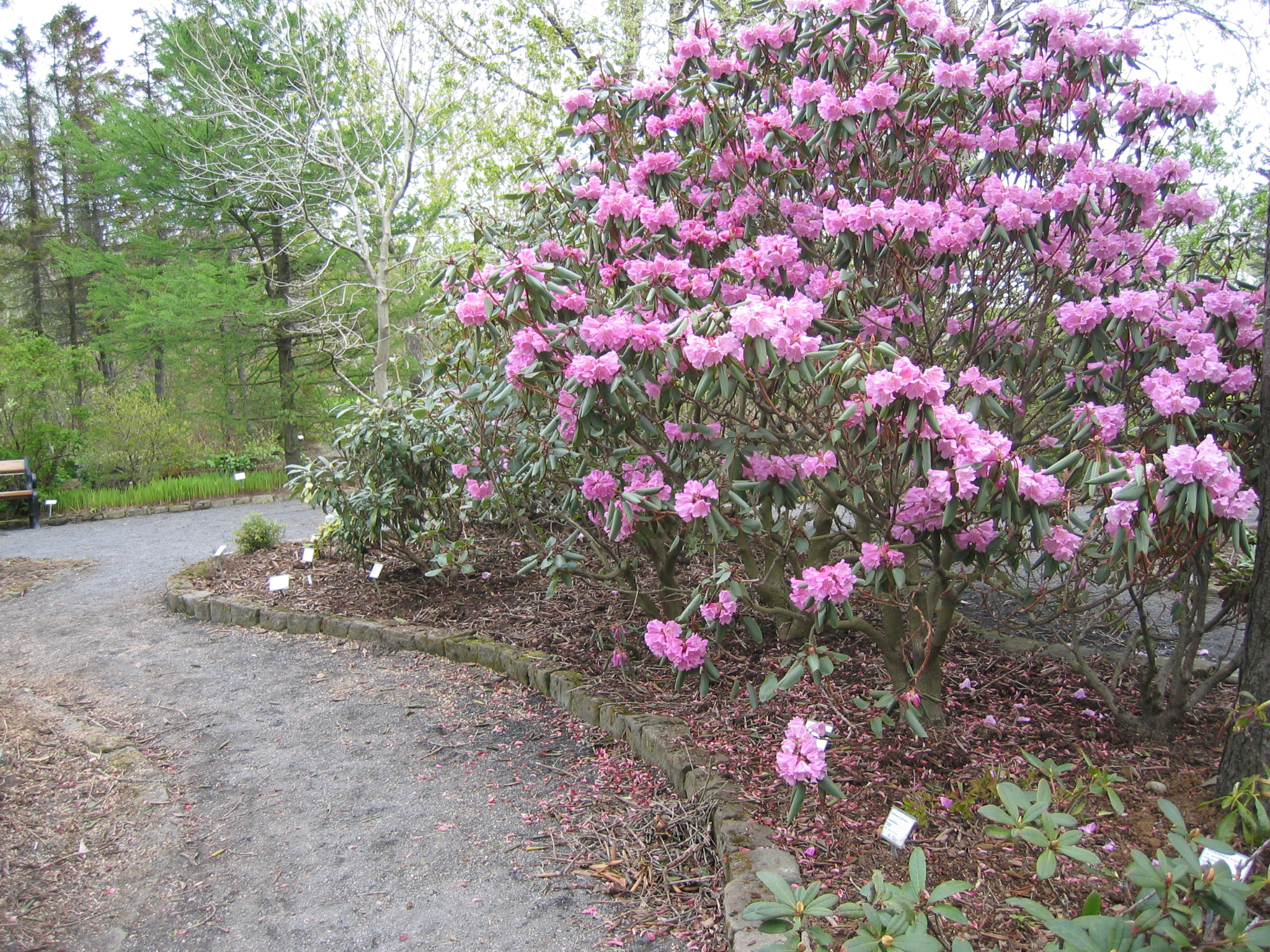
- Rhododendrom oreodoxa var. fargesii in Iceland

Scientific classification
- Kingdom: Plantae
- Clade: Embryophytes
- Clade: Tracheophytes
- Clade: Spermatophytes
- Clade: Angiosperms
- Clade: Eudicots
- Clade: Asterids
- Order: Ericales
- Family: Ericaceae
- Genus: Rhododendron
- Species: R. oreodoxa

Binomial name
- Rhododendron oreodoxa Franch.

Synonyms
- List: Rhododendron haematocheilum Craib; Rhododendron limprichtii Diels; Rhododendron reginaldii Balf.f.

= Rhododendron oreodoxa =

Species of flowering plant

Rhododendron oreodoxa is a species of flowering plant in the genus Rhododendron native to central China. Its variety Rhododendron oreodoxa var. fargesii, called the Père Farges rhododendron, has gained the Royal Horticultural Society's Award of Garden Merit.

== Varieties ==
The following varieties are currently accepted:

- Rhododendron oreodoxa var. adenostylosum W.P.Fang & W.K.Hu
- Rhododendron oreodoxa var. fargesii (Franch.) D.F.Chamb.
- Rhododendron oreodoxa var. shensiense D.F.Chamb.
