= Qilian Mountains =

Mountain range in China

- 祁連山
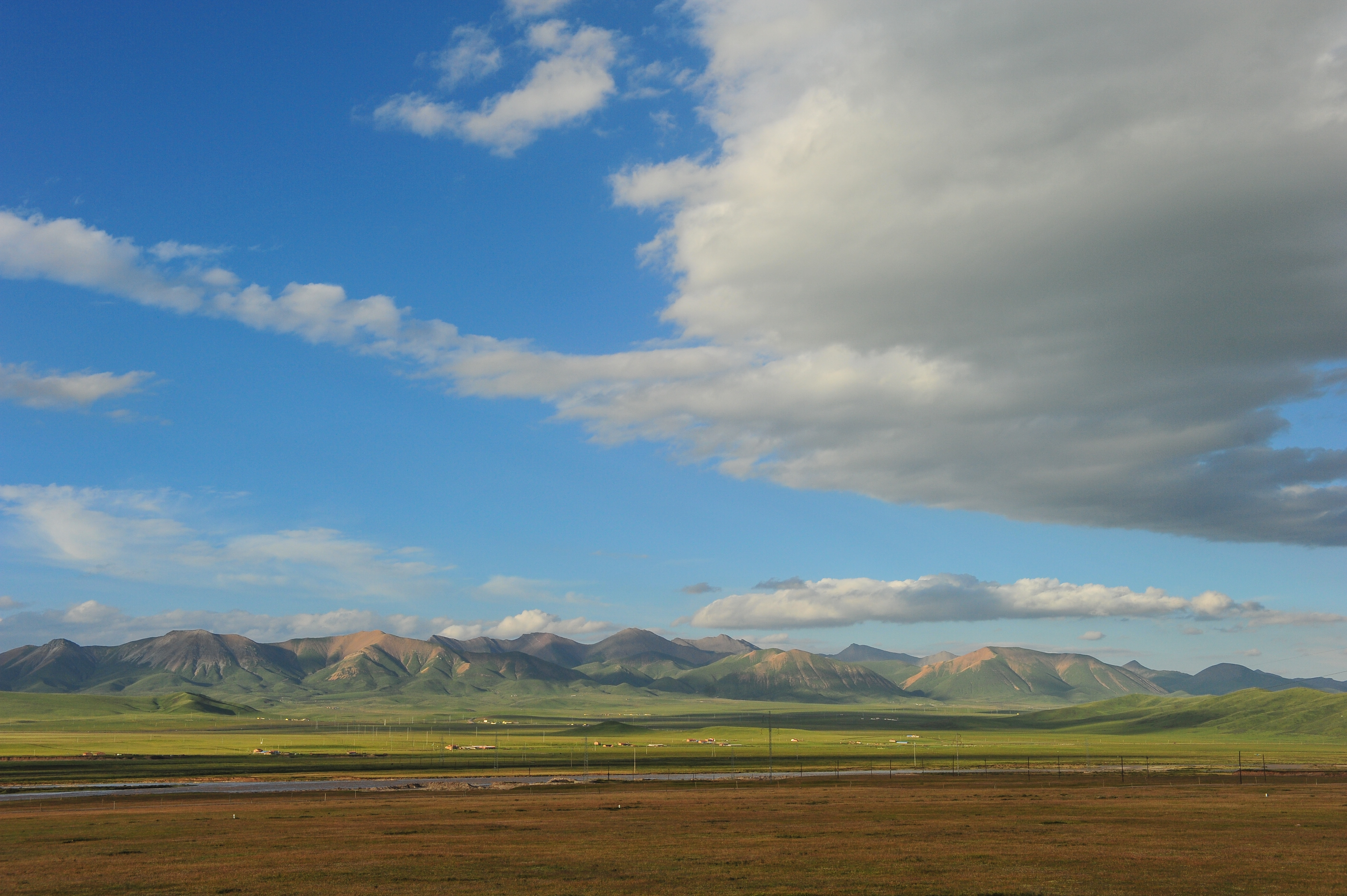
- Qilian Mountains in Qilian County, Qinghai

Highest point
- Peak: Kangze Gyai
- Elevation: 5,808 m (19,055 ft)

Geography
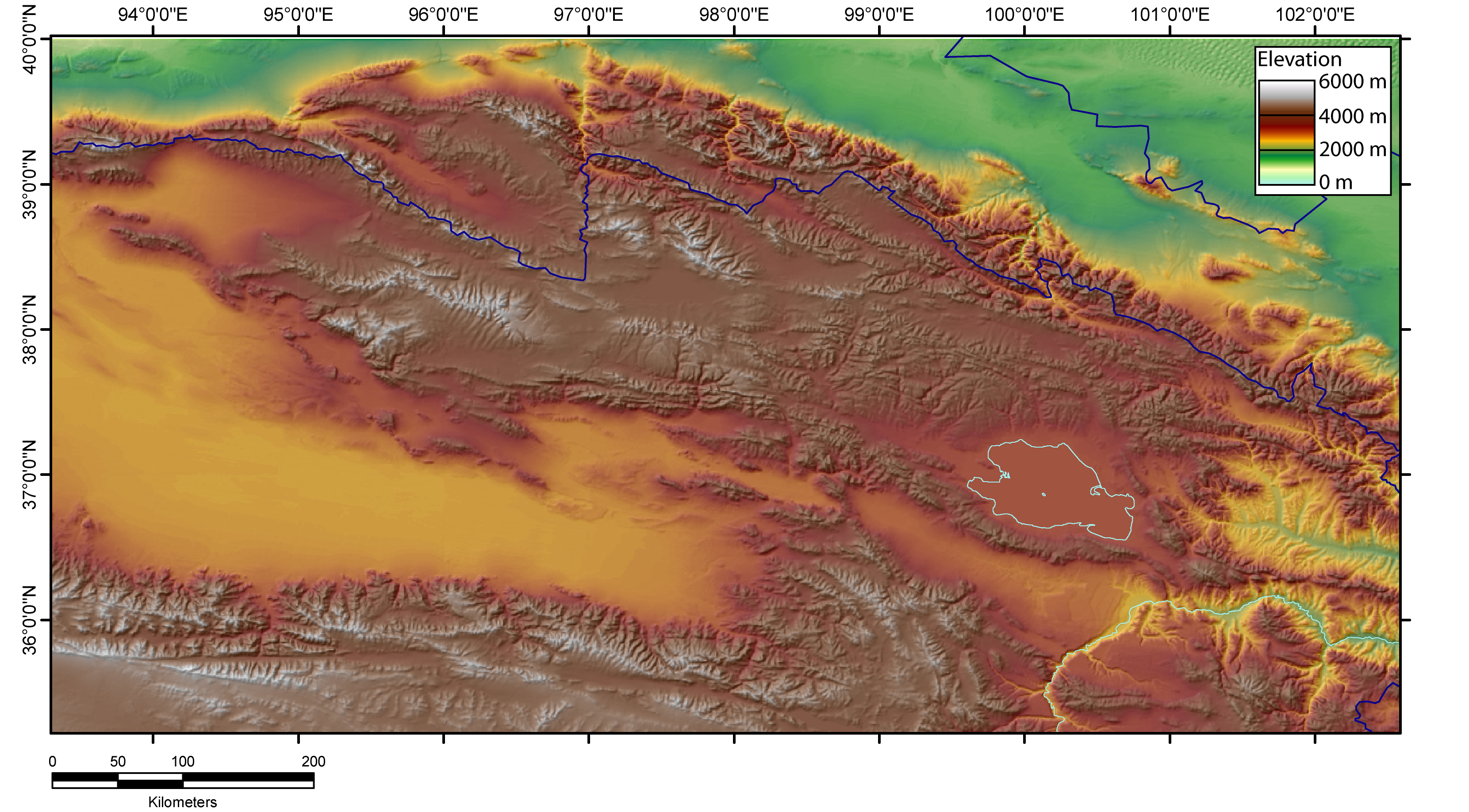
- Location: Gansu and Qinghai provinces, China

The Qilian Mountains, (Note: simplified Chinese: 祁连山; traditional Chinese: 祁連山; pinyin: Qílián Shān; IPA: [t͡ɕʰǐljæ̌n ʂán]; Tibetan: མདོ་ལ་རིང་མོ; Mongghul: Chileb) along with the Altyn-Tagh sometimes known as the Nan Shan (Note: Chinese: 南山; pinyin: Nánshān; IPA: [nǎnʂán]; lit. 'South(ern) Mountains') as it is to the south of the Hexi Corridor, are northern outliers of the Kunlun Mountains, forming the border between the Qinghai and Gansu provinces of China.

== Geography ==
The range stretches from the south of Dunhuang some 800 km to the southeast, forming the northeastern escarpment of the Tibetan Plateau and the southwestern border of the Hexi Corridor.

The eponymous Qilian Shan peak, situated some 60 km south of Jiuquan, at 39°12′N 98°32′E, rises to 5,547 m. It is the highest peak of the main range, but there are two higher peaks further south, Kangze'gyai at 38°30′N 97°43′E with 5,808 m and Qaidam Shan peak at 38°2′N 95°19′E with 5,759 m. Other major peaks include Gangshiqia Peak in the east.

The Nan-Shan range continues to the west as Yema Shan (5,250 m) and Altun Shan (Altyn Tagh) (5,798 m). To the east, it passes north of Qinghai Lake, terminating as Daban Shan and Xinglong Shan near Lanzhou, with Maoma Shan peak (4,070 m) as an eastern outlier. Sections of the Ming dynasty's Great Wall pass along its northern slopes, and south of the northern outlier Longshou Shan (3,616 m).

The Qilian mountains are the source of numerous, mostly small, rivers and creeks that flow northeast, enabling irrigated agriculture in the Hexi Corridor (Gansu Corridor) communities, and eventually disappearing in the Alashan Desert. The best known of these streams is the Ejin (Heihe) River. The region has many glaciers, the largest of which is the Touming Mengke. These glaciers have undergone acceleration in their melting in recent decades.

Lake Hala is a large brackish lake, located within the Qilian mountains.

The characteristic ecosystem of the Qilian Mountains has been described by the World Wildlife Fund as the Qilian Mountains conifer forests.

Biandukou (扁都口), with an altitude of over 3500 m, is a pass in the Qilian Mountains. It links Minle County of Gansu in the north and Qilian County of Qinghai in the south.

== History ==
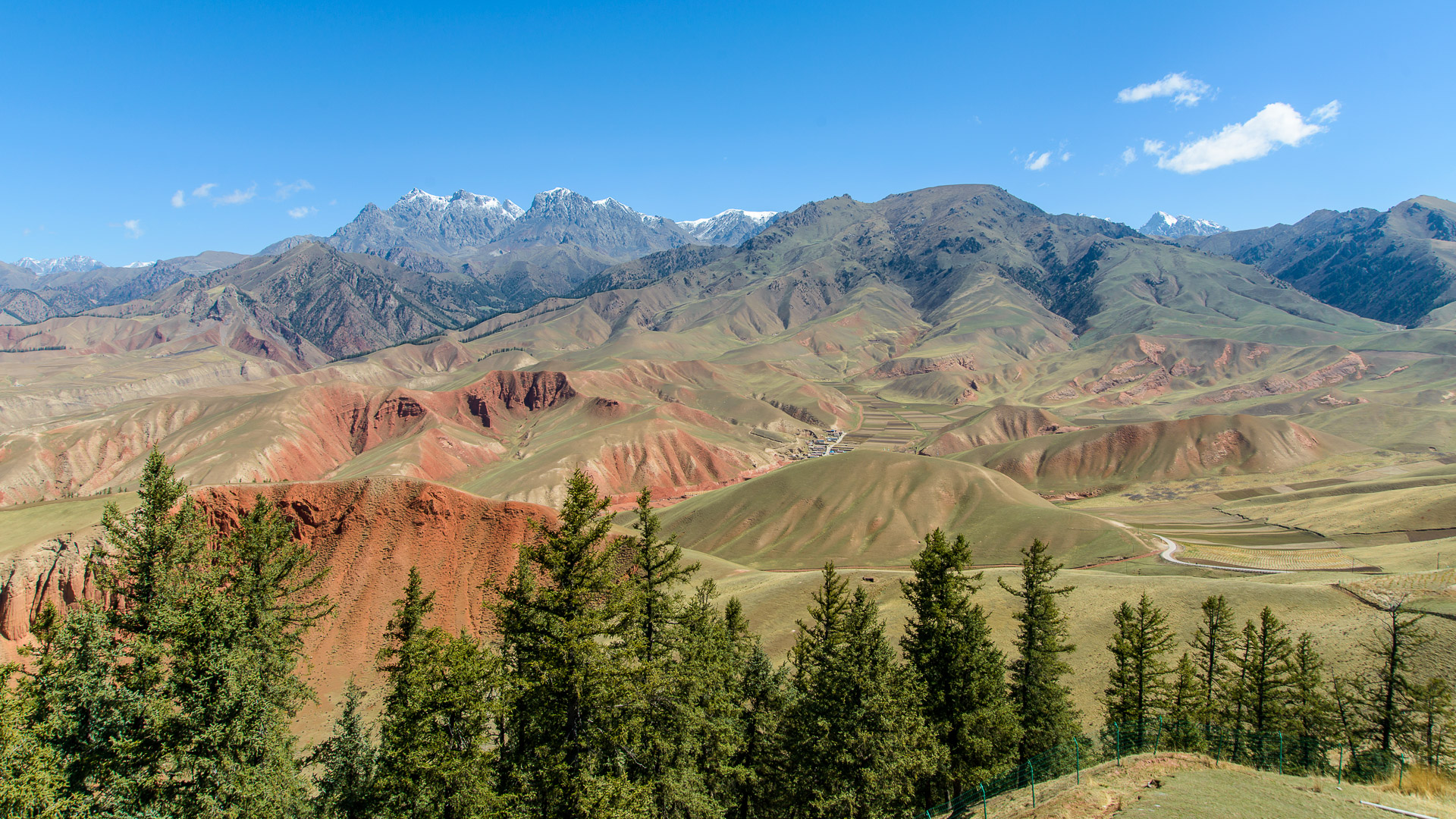
View of Qilian Mountains

The Shiji mentions the name "Qilian mountains" together with Dunhuang in relation to the homeland of the Yuezhi. These Qilian Mountains however, have been suggested to be the mountains now known as Tian Shan, 1,500 km to the west. Dunhuang has also been argued to be the Dunhong mountain. Qilian (祁连) is said to be a Xiongnu word meaning "sky" (Chinese: 天) according to Yan Shigu, a Tang dynasty commentator on the Hanshu. Sanping Chen (1998) suggested that 天 tiān, 昊天 hàotiān, 祁連 qílián, and 赫連 Hèlián were all cognates and descended from multisyllabic Proto-Sinitic *gh?klien.

Schessler (2014) objects to Yan Shigu's statement that 祁連 was a Xiongnu word; he reconstructs 祁連's pronunciation in around 121 BCE as *gɨ-lian, apparently the same etymon as 乾 (☰) the trigram for "Heaven", in standard Chinese qián < Middle Chinese QYS *gjän < Eastern Han Chinese gɨan < Old Chinese *gran, which Schuessler etymologizes as from Proto-Sino-Tibetan and related to Proto-Tibeto-Burman *m-ka-n, cognate with Written Tibetan མཁའ (Wylie transliteration: mkha') “heaven”.

The Tuyuhun were based around the Qilian mountains.

The mountain range was formerly known in European languages as the Richthofen Range after Ferdinand von Richthofen, who was the Red Baron's explorer-geologist uncle.

The mountain range gives its name to Qinghai's Qilian County.

== See also ==
- List of ultras of Tibet, East Asia and neighbouring areas
- Yanzhi Mountains
