= List of alphabets used by Turkic languages =

Most common scripts used by Turkic languages Latin Cyrillic Arabic Latin & cyrillic

There exist several alphabets used by Turkic languages, i.e. alphabets used to write Turkic languages:

- The New Turkic Alphabet (Yañalif) in use in the 1930s USSR (Latin)
- The Common Turkic Alphabet, proposed by Turkic Council to unify scripts in Turkic languages (Latin)

== Current languages ==
- Any alphabet in use for writing Turkic languages:
Scripts used in local Wikipedia editions
Scripts used in Wikipedia localizations

Language	Alphabet	Latin	Cyrillic	Arabic
Altai language (south)	Altai alphabets	Historical	Official	
Altai language (north)	Altai alphabets	Historical	Widely used	
Äynu language	Äynu alphabet			In China
Azerbaijani language	Azerbaijani alphabet	Official; In Azerbaijan	Official; In Dagestan (Russia)	Official; In Iran
Bashkir language	Bashkir alphabet	Historical	Official	Historical
Chulym language	Chulym alphabet		In Russia	
Chuvash language	Chuvash alphabet		Official	Historical
Crimean Tatar language	Crimean Tatar alphabet	Official; In Ukraine	Official	Historical
Dolgan language	Dolgan alphabet	Historical	In Russia	
Gagauz language	Gagauz alphabet	Official	Historical	
Ili Turki language	Ili Turki alphabet	Mostly unwritten	Mostly unwritten	
Karachay-Balkar language	Karachay-Balkar alphabet	Historical	Official	Historical
Karaim language	Karaim alphabets	In Lithuania	In Crimea	
Karakalpak language	Karakalpak alphabet	Official	Widely used	Historical
Kazakh language	Kazakh alphabets	Official; In Kazakhstan; Transition by 2025	Widely used	Official; In Xinjiang of China
Khakas language	Khakas alphabet	Historical	Official	
Khalaj language	Khalaj alphabet			In Iran
Khorasani Turkic	Khorasani Turkic alphabet			In Iran
Krymchak language	Krymchak alphabet	Historical	In Crimea	
Kumyk language	Kumyk alphabet	Historical	Official	Historical
Kyrgyz language	Kyrgyz alphabets	Historical, future adoption	Official	In Xinjiang of China
Nogai language	Nogai alphabets	Historical	Official	Historical
Qashqai language	Qashqai alphabet			In Iran
Salar language	Salar alphabets	Widely used Pinyin-based alphabet also used		Widely used
Shor language	Shor alphabet	Historical	In Russia	
Siberian Tatar language	Siberian Tatar alphabet	Historical	In Russia	
Tatar language	Tatar alphabet	Widely used: Zamanälif; Historical: Yañalif	Official	Historical: İske imlâ alphabet Yaña imlâ
Tofa language	Tofa alphabet		In Russia	
Turkish language	Turkish alphabet	Official		Historical: Ottoman Turkish alphabet
Turkmen language	Turkmen alphabet	Official	Widely used	Historical
Tuvan language	Tuvan alphabet	Historical	Official	
Urum language	Urum alphabet	Historical	Widely used	
Uyghur language	Uyghur alphabets	Still used: Uyghur Latin alphabet Historical: Uyghur Pinyin alphabet	Still used: Uyghur Cyrillic alphabet	Official: Uyghur Arabic alphabet Historical: Chagatai script
Uzbek language	Uzbek alphabet	Official in Uzbekistan	Widely used	Official in Afghanistan
Western Yugur language	Western Yugur alphabet	In China		
Yakut language	Yakut alphabet	Historical	Official	

a: Historically written in Greek script
b: Also written in Hebrew script
c: Also written in Chinese characters
d: Historically, Armenian script is used infrequently

== Extinct languages ==
- The medieval Old Turkic script (Göktürk script, Orkhon script, Orkhon-Yenisey script, ISO 15924: Orkh) for Old Turkic language
- Old Uyghur alphabet (ISO 15924: Ougr) for Old Uyghur language
- Cuman language (Latin)
- Karamanli Turkish written in Greek script
