= Yugur language =

Yugur language may refer to two languages spoken by the Yugurs:

- Western Yugur language, a Turkic language
- Eastern Yugur language, a Mongolic language
