= Potaninia =

Potaninia may refer to:

- Potaninia (beetle), a genus of the leaf beetle family in tribe Chrysomelini
- Potaninia (plant), a genus of plants in the family Rosaceae
