= Tata-tonga =

Uyghur scribe who developed the Mongolian script

Tata-tonga or Tatatunga (/ˌtætəˈtʊŋɡə/; Mongolian: ᠲᠠᠲᠠᠲᠤᠩᠭ᠎ᠠ Тататунга [ˈtʰatʰatʰʊɴɢ(ə)]) was a 13th-century Uyghur scribe captured by Genghis Khan from the Naimans. He was involved in bringing the Old Uyghur alphabet to the Mongolian Plateau and adapting it to the form of the Mongolian script (Mongol bichig or hudum bichig). After his capture, he was invited to teach the Old Uyghur alphabet to members of the court, including the Khan's sons.

The Uyghur script was used until 1946, when Cyrillic script was introduced to replace it. It is still used mainly in Inner Mongolia, China. In present-day Mongolia, Cyrillic is one of the two official scripts for the Mongolian language; the other one is the traditional script, which is referred to as the old Mongol script (Mongolian: Хуучин монгол бичиг). Today, an estimated six million Mongol people in China can still read the traditional Mongolian script.

The Manchu alphabet was derived since the very end of the 16th century from this Mongolian script.
