= Khakas alphabets =

Alphabets used in the Khakas language

Khakass alphabets are the alphabets used to write the Khakas language.

The Khakass script based on the Cyrillic alphabet was created in 1924, although there are also earlier attempts to create a script that were not developed. However, already in 1929, in the course of romanization, it was translated into Latin script. In 1939, the Khakass script was again translated into Cyrillic. The 1939 alphabet, with some modifications, is still in use today.

== Early Cyrillic alphabets (1890s–1929) ==
Back in the 1890s, Orthodox missionaries published several religious books in the Khakass language. These books used the Russian alphabet with the addition of several characters for specific Khakass sounds (Ӧ ӧ and Ӱ ӱ).

Soon after the October Revolution and the establishment of Soviet power in the territory inhabited by the Khakas, the question arose of eliminating illiteracy. This issue could not be resolved without the creation of a written language for the Khakass language. The first experiments on the creation of writing were started in 1921-1922 by an initiative group of Khakass students at the Yeniseysk Governorate department of public education. This group considered a number of projects, among which the projects of M. I. Raikov and T. D. Mainagashev stand out. Raikov's project was based on the Cyrillic alphabet and was well suited for recording the phonetic features of Khakass speech. However, for the purposes of mass education of the population, it was too complicated. Mainagashev's project, which was also based on the Cyrillic alphabet, on the contrary, did not cover all the main sounds of the Khakass language. Soon the initiative group combined the projects of Raikov and Mainagashev, finalized them and approved the resulting version. However, it has not received practical application.

Khakass alphabet projects of the early 1920s:

- Project by M.I. Raikov: А а, Б б, Б̣ б̣, Г г, Г̂ г̂, Д д, Е е, З з, І і, Î î, Й й, К к, К̂ к̂, Л л, L l, М м, Н н, Ң ң, О о, Ӧ ӧ, П п, Р р, С с, Т т, У у, Ӱ ӱ, Ч ч, Ш ш, Щ щ, Ы ы. The length of vowels was indicated by a bar under the letter, and the shortness was indicated by a comma above the letter.
- Project by T. D. Mainagashev: А а, О о, У у, Ы ы, І і, Б б, П п, Д д, Т т, Ѕ ѕ, Г г, К к, Х х, Л л, М м, Н н, N n, Р р, Ч ч, Ц ц, Э э, Ө ө, Ю ю, Я я.
- Project by V.A. Kozhevnikov: А а, О о, У у, Ы ы, Ь ь, Е е, И и, Б б, П п, Д д, Т т, Ɔ ɔ, Г г, К к, Х х, Л л, М м, Н н, В в, Р р, Ч ч, Ц ц.
- Project of M. G. Torosov and N. M. Odezhkin: А а, О о, У у, Ы ы, Э э, Ф ф, Ю ю, И и, Ъ ъ, Ь ь, П п, Д д, Т т, С с, Г г, К к, Я я, Л л, М м, Н н, Б б, Р р, Ч ч, Ц ц, Е е, К к.

After the Khakas uyezd was created in 1923, the issue of creating the Khakass alphabet became even more relevant. On April 25, 1924, the Yeniseysk Governorate department of public education adopted a resolution "On the development of the Khakass script." On September 4 of the same year, the Khakassian revkom approved a special commission at the district department of public education. Unlike the initiative group of 1922, this commission included not students, but persons with a pedagogical education who had experience in the field of public education. The chairman of the commission was the chairman of the Khakass executive committee, Itygin G. I.; Kishteev I. M., Kuzurgashev S. I., Raikov M. I., Samarin K. K., Todyshev K. S., Shtygashev P. T. became members of the commission. Later they were joined by Kazankov. A. T.

Already at the beginning of November 1924, the draft of the new alphabet was ready, about which the commission reported to the I Oblastnoy Congress of Soviets. This alphabet was based on the Cyrillic alphabet and contained the following additional letters for specific Khakass sounds: Г̈ г̈, Ј ј, Ҥ ҥ, Ӧ ӧ, Ӱ ӱ, Ӹ ӹ According to other sources, the letter k was also included in the alphabet.

In June 1925, at a meeting of the Oirots, Khakases and Shors in Novo-Nikolaevsk, the question of unifying their alphabets was discussed. It was decided to choose the Oirot alphabet as a model. In this regard, the letters г̈, k, ӹ were excluded from the project of the Khakass alphabet. As a result, the Khakassian alphabet was finally approved in the following composition of signs: Аа, Бб, Гг, Дд, Зз, Ии, Кк, Лл, Мм, Нн, Оо, Пп, Рр, Сс, Тт, Уу, Хх, Чч, Ыы, Ј ј, Ӱӱ, Ӧӧ, Ҥҥ, Йй, Ээ. For borrowings from the Russian language, the letters Вв, Ее, Жж, Фф, Цц, Шш, Щщ, Юю, Яя, ь were introduced. This alphabet had a number of shortcomings: there were no signs for open [i] and voiced uvular [ғ]. In addition, the length of vowels was not displayed.

To overcome the first of these shortcomings in 1927-1928, the letters І і and һ were introduced into the alphabet.

== Latin alphabet (1929–1939) ==
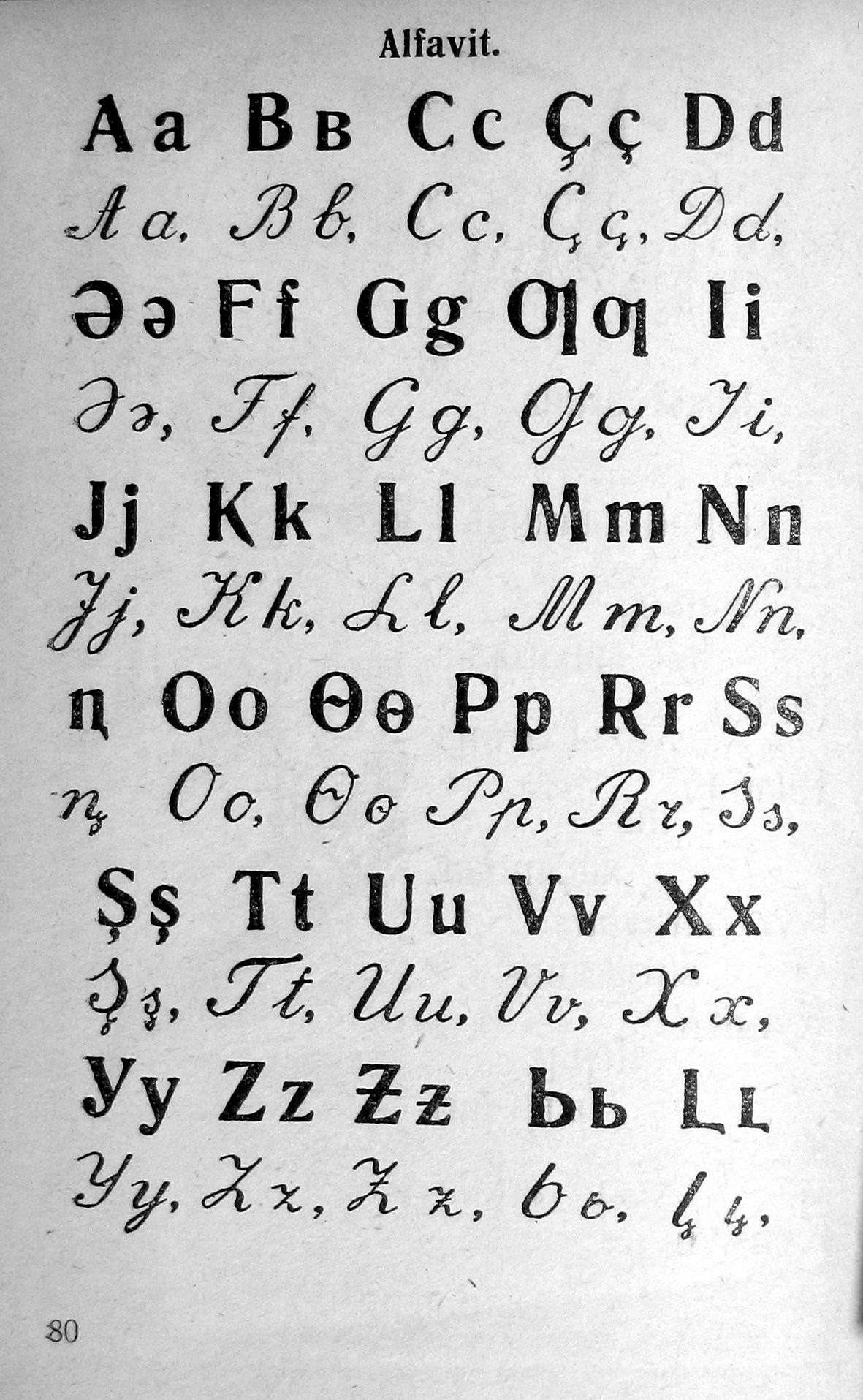
Khakass alphabet from the ABC-book of 1934.

In the late 1920s, the process of romanization of alphabets was actively going on in the USSR. During this process, a decision was made to translate the Khakas alphabet into Latin. The process of switching to the Latin alphabet began in 1929, and since 1930, all educational literature and the Khakass regional newspaper Khyzyl Aal began to be published in the new alphabet. The Khakasian Latinized alphabet had the following form (in 1935, the letter Ә ә was replaced by E e):

| A a | B ʙ | C c | Ç ç | D d | Ә ә | F f | G g |
| Ƣ ƣ | I i | Į į | J j | K k | L l | M m | N n |
| Ꞑ ꞑ | O o | Ө ө | P p | R r | S s | Ş ş | T t |
| U u | V v | X x | Y y | Z z | Ƶ ƶ | Ь ь |

The disadvantages of this alphabet include the lack of letters necessary for a more accurate spelling of borrowings from the Russian language (for example, the Russian: цирк - cirk (circus) was written as sirk). A more important problem was that schoolchildren had to simultaneously study two writing systems at once - Latin (when learning their native language) and Cyrillic (when learning the Russian language). This led to significant difficulties in mastering writing in elementary school.

== Modern Cyrillic alphabet (1939–present) ==
Around the mid-1930s, the USSR was in the process of translating scripts into Cyrillic. During this process, in 1939 it was translated into Cyrillic and the Khakas alphabet. It had the following form: Аа, Бб, Вв, Гг, Дд, Ее, Жж, Зз, Ии, Іі, Йй, Кк, Лл, Мм, Нн, Нъ нъ, Оо, Ӧӧ, Пп, Рр, Сс, Тт, Уу, Ӱӱ, Фф, Хх, Цц, Чч, Шш, Щщ, ь, Ыы, ъ, Ээ, Юю, Яя.

However, this alphabet also had drawbacks: it did not distinguish between the sounds [г] — [ғ] and [ч] — [ӌ]. This shortcoming was eliminated in 1947, when the letters Ғ ғ and Ӌ ӌ were introduced into the alphabet. In 1962, the letter Нъ нъ was replaced by the letter Ң ң. After that, the Khakass alphabet took its current form:

| А а | Б б | В в | Г г | Ғ ғ | Д д | Е е | Ё ё |
| Ж ж | З з | И и | Й й | I i | К к | Л л | М м |
| Н н | Ң ң | О о | Ӧ ӧ | П п | Р р | С с | Т т |
| У у | Ӱ ӱ | Ф ф | Х х | Ц ц | Ч ч | Ӌ ӌ | Ш ш |
| Щ щ | Ъ ъ | Ы ы | Ь ь | Э э | Ю ю | Я я |

In practice, in many printed and electronic publications in the Khakass language, the letter Ҷ is used, with a tail on the right.

== Correspondence chart ==
| Cyrillic 1924—1929 | Latin | Cyrillic since 1939 | Common Turkic alphabet | IPA |
|---|---|---|---|---|
| Аa | Аa | Аа | Aa | /a/ |
| Бб | Bв | Бб | Bb | /b/ |
| Вв | Vv | Вв | Vv | /v/ |
| Гг | Gg | Гг | Gg | /g/ |
| Һh (since 1927) | Ƣƣ | Ғғ (since 1947) | Ğğ | /ɣ/ |
| Дд | Dd | Дд | Dd | /d/ |
| Ее | (je) | Ее | (ye) | /je/ |
| | (jo) | Ёё (since 1953) | (yo) | /jo/ |
| Жж | Ƶƶ | Жж | Jj | /ʒ/ |
| Зз | Zz | Зз | Zz | /z/ |
| Ии | Ii | Ии | İi | /i/ |
| Ii (since 1927) | Įį | Ii | Ĕĕ | /ɘ/ |
| Йй | Jj | Йй | Yy | /j/ |
| Кк | Kk | Кк | Kk | /k/ |
| Лл | Ll | Лл | Ll | /l/ |
| Мм | Mm | Мм | Mm | /m/ |
| Нн | Nn | Нн | Nn | /n/ |
| Ҥҥ | Ꞑꞑ | Нъ нъ (before 1962); Ң ң (since 1962) | Ññ | /ŋ/ |
| Оо | Оо | Оо | Oo | /o/ |
| Ӧӧ | Ɵɵ | Ӧӧ | Öö | /ø/ |
| Пп | Pp | Пп | Pp | /p/ |
| Рр | Rr | Рр | Rr | /r/ |
| Сс | Ss | Сс | Ss | /s/ |
| Тт | Tt | Тт | Tt | /t/ |
| Уу | Uu | Уу | Uu | /u/ |
| Ӱӱ | Yy | Ӱӱ | Üü | /y/ |
| Фф | Ff | Фф | Ff | /f/ |
| Хх | Хх | Хх | Xx | /x/ |
| Цц | (ts) | Цц | (ts) | (/t͡s/), /s/ |
| Чч | Cc | Чч | Çç | /t͡ʃ/ |
| Jj | Çç | Ӌӌ (since 1947) | Cc | /d͡ʒ/ |
| Шш | Şş | Шш | Şş | /ʃ/ |
| Щщ | (şc) | Щщ | (şç) | /ɕː/ |
| | ‘ | ъ | ” | /◌./ |
| Ыы | Ьь | Ыы | Iı | /ɯ/ |
| ь | ’ | ь | ’ | /◌ʲ/ |
| Ээ | Әә, Ee (since 1935) | Ээ | Ee | /e/ |
| Юю | (ju) | Юю | (yu) | /ju/ |
| Яя | (ja) | Яя | (ya) | /ja/ |
