= Western Yugur language =

Siberian Turkic language of Gansu, China

Western Yugur
- Neo-Uyghur
- yoğır lar yoğır śoz
- Native to: China
- Region: Gansu
- Ethnicity: 7,000 Yugur (2007)
- Native speakers: ~2,000 (~1,000 fluent) (2019)
- Language family: Turkic: Common Turkic; Siberian Turkic (Northeastern Turkic); South Siberian; Yenisei Turkic; Western Yugur
- Early forms: Old Turkic: Old Uyghur
- Writing system: Old Uyghur alphabet (until 19th century); Latin alphabet (current)

Language codes
- ISO 639-3: ybe
- Glottolog: west2402
- ELP: Yellow Uyghur
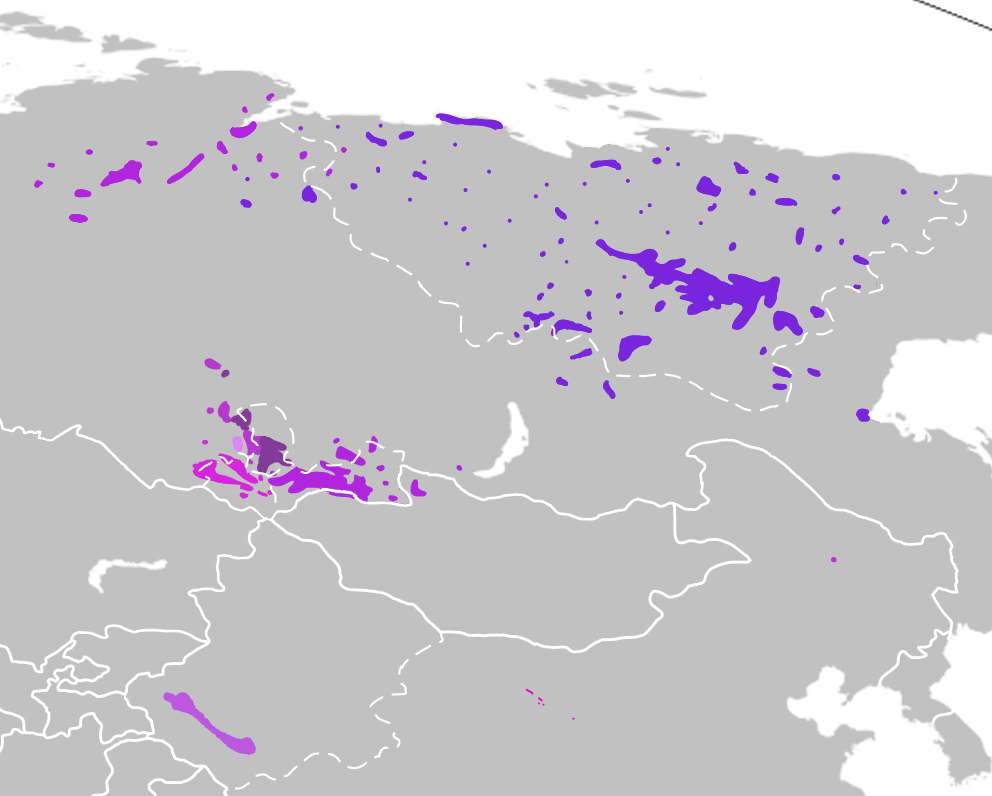
- Western Yugur (lower part of the map, center)

- Western Yugur is classified as Severely Endangered by the UNESCO Atlas of the World's Languages in Danger.

Western Yugur (Yoğır lar 'Yugur speech' or Yoğır śoz 'Yugur word'), also known as Neo-Uyghur or Neo-Uygur, is the Turkic language spoken by the Yugur people. It is contrasted with Eastern Yugur, a Mongolic language spoken within the same community. Traditionally, both languages are indicated by the term Yellow Uyghur or Yellow Uygur, from the endonym of the Yugur.

There are approximately 2,000 speakers of Western Yugur.

== Classification ==
Besides similarities with Uyghuric languages, Western Yugur also shares a number of features, mainly archaisms, with several of the Northeastern Turkic languages, but it is not closer to any one of them in particular. Neither Western nor Eastern Yugur are mutually intelligible with the modern Uyghur language spoken amongst the Uyghurs of China's Xinjiang autonomous region.

Western Yugur also contains archaisms which are attested in neither modern Uyghuric nor Siberian, such as its anticipating counting system coinciding with Old Uyghur, and its copula dro, which also originated from Old Uyghur but substitutes the Uyghur copulative personal suffixes.

== History ==
Modern Uyghur and Western Yugur belong to entirely different branches of the Turkic language family, respectively the Karluk languages spoken in the Kara-Khanid Khanate (such as the Xākānī language described in Mahmud al-Kashgari's Dīwān al-Luġat al-Turk) and the Siberian Turkic languages, which include Old Uyghur.

The Yugur are descended from the Ganzhou Uyghur Kingdom, Qocho and the Uyghur Khaganate.

Grigory Potanin recorded a glossary of Salar, Western Yugur, and Eastern Yugur in his 1893 Russian language book The Tangut-Tibetan Borderlands of China and Central Mongolia.

== Geographic distribution ==
Speakers of Western Yugur reside primarily in the western part of Gansu province's Sunan Yugur Autonomous County. They are concentrated in the Dahe and Minghua townships and the northern portion of the Huangcheng township.

== Phonology ==
A special feature in Western Yugur is the occurrence of preaspiration, corresponding to the so-called pharyngealised low vowels in Tuvan and Tofa, and short vowels in Yakut, Turkmen, and Khalkha Mongolian. Examples of this phenomenon include ôtış /oʰtɯs/ 'thirty', yâş /jɑʰʂ/ 'good', and ît /iʰt/ 'meat'.

The vowel harmony system, typical of Turkic languages, has largely collapsed. However, it still exists for a-suffixes (back a; front i), however for stems containing last close vowels are chosen unpredictably pılği (/pɯlɣi/ 'knowing') vs ıstqa (/ɯstqɑ/ 'pushing'). Voicing as a distinguishing feature in plosives and affricates was replaced by aspiration, as in Chinese.

=== Consonants ===
West Yugur has 28 native consonants and two more (indicated in parentheses) found only in loan words.

Consonant phonemes
		Labial	Alveolar	Retroflex	Palatal	Velar	Uvular	Glottal
Nasal		m	n			ŋ		
Plosive	unaspirated	p	t			k	q	
Plosive	aspirated	pʰ	tʰ			kʰ	qʰ	
Affricate	unaspirated		t͡s	ʈ͡ʂ	t͡ɕ			
Affricate	aspirated		(t͡sʰ)	ʈ͡ʂʰ	t͡ɕʰ			
Fricative	voiceless	(f)	s	ʂ	ɕ	x		h
Fricative	voiced		z	ʐ		ɣ		
Trill			r					
Approximant			l		j	w		

=== Vowels ===
Western Yugur has eight vowel phonemes typical of many Turkic languages, which are /i, y, ɯ, u, e, ø, o, ɑ/. The phoneme /e/ is currently merging with /i/, especially for speakers in the younger generation. In the table below, the IPA symbol for each vowel is given and alongside it the standard Turcological orthographic form is provided in angular brackets.

Western Yugur vowel phonemes
	Front		Back	
	unrounded	rounded	unrounded	rounded
High	i ⟨i⟩	y ⟨ü⟩	ɯ ⟨ï⟩	u ⟨u⟩
Low	e ⟨e⟩	ø ⟨ö⟩	ɑ^{1} ⟨a⟩	o ⟨o⟩

^{1} Zhong, 2019 uses the symbol /a/, used by the IPA for the front low unrounded vowel, but describes it as "low back unrounded" (p. 93). The IPA symbol matching that description, low back unrounded /ɑ/, is used in this article for descriptions of the phoneme, while ⟨a⟩ is used in most practical orthographies of the language.

==== Allophony ====
The following allophonic realizations may occur.

- /i/ is generally [i] when morpheme-medial and [ɪ] when morpheme-final, especially after an obstruent.
- /ɯ/ is generally [ɯ] when in a word-initial syllable and [ɯ̞̈] in a word-final syllable, except when word-final and preceding [ɾ].
- /u/ is realized as [ʊ] when preceding by a velar or uvular stop, and as [u] otherwise.
- /ɑ/ is realized as [ɑ] after uvular stops or the fricatives /x, ɣ, h/, as well as when preceding /ŋ/. When preceding /j/ or when after /j, tɕ/ and before /n/, [ɛ] occurs as an allophone. Otherwise, [ä] typically occurs.
- /e/ is realized as [ɛ] when preceding coda /m, n, r/, in particular when following an aspirated stop. Word-initial /e/ is variably realized as [ɪ] and [e] for certain speakers. Otherwise, [e] generally occurs.
- /o, ø, y/ do not tend to vary in pronunciation and are simply realized as [o, ø, y] respectively.

=== Diachronic processes ===
Several sound changes affected Western Yugur phonology while evolving from its original Common Turkic form, the most prolific being:

==== Vowels ====
- High vowels were delabialized in non-initial syllables: CT *tütün > *tütin > WYu tûtın 'to smoke'; CT *altun > *altın > WYu âltım 'gold'
- CT *u was lowered to WYu o in some words, most commonly around velars and r: CT *burun > WYu pôrn 'before, front'
- All high vowels were merged – as front vowels in palatal contexts, and as back otherwise: CT *üçün > WYu uçin 'with, using'; CT *yılan > WYu yılan 'snake'
  - This had several consequences:
    1. It made the Common Turkic allophonic difference between *k and *q phonemic.
    2. Vowel harmonic class of resulting words was thus determined lexically in Western Yugur.
    3. Former vowel harmonic suffixes with high vowels became invariable: CT: *-Ki/*-Kï > WYu -Kï (attributive noun suffix)
- Front vowels *ä, *e, *ö were raised to *i, *ü except before *r, *l, *ŋ and (excluding *ö) *g: CT *ərən > WYu erin 'man'; CT *kők > WYu kük; CT *-lar/*-lər > WYu -lar/-lir (plural suffix)
- CT *ay is reflected as WYu ey~e in the initial syllable and as i otherwise.
- In the initial syllable exclusively, short vowels acquire pre-aspiration of the following consonant, length distinction is otherwise lost.

==== Consonants ====
- As in most Turkic language, initial *b was assimilated to *m in words containing nasals.
- Initial plosives and affricates, CT *b, *t, *k, *g, *č, are all reflected as voiceless with unpredictable aspiration: CT *temir > WYu temır; CT *bog- > WYu pôğ- 'to tie with a rope'
- Labials are merged into *w intervocally and after liquids which later in some cases forms diphthongs or get elided: CT *yubaş > WYu yüvaş 'calm'; CT *harpa > WYu harva 'barley'
- Finally and in most consonant clusters *p is preserved and *b elided.
- Dental and velar voiceless plosives are preserved in most positions, with aspiration occurring almost exclusively in the initial position.
- CT *g is spirantized into ɣ and CT *d into z.
- With some exceptions, CT *š develops into s: CT *táş > WYu tas 'stone'
- CT *z is preserved, except for devoicing when final in polysyllabic words: CT *otuz > WYu ôtıs 'thirty'
- CT *ş generally becomes WYu ş in syllable codas.
- CT *ñ develops into WYu y; initial CT *y- is mostly preserved; CT *h- is seemingly preserved in some words but the extent to which WYu h- corresponds to it is unclear.

== Grammar ==
Personal markers in nouns as well as in verbs were largely lost. In the verbal system, the notion of evidentiality has been grammaticalised, seemingly under the influence of Tibetan.

=== Grammatical cases ===
		After obstruents	After nasals	After -z
Nominative		-∅		
Accusative		-ti	-ni	
Genitive		-tiñ	-niñ	
Dative	Back	-qa		-ğa
Dative	Front	-ki		
Locative	Back	-ta		
Locative	Front	-ti		
Ablative	Back	-tan		
Ablative	Front	-tin		

Four kinship terms have distinct vocative forms, and used when calling out loudly: aqu (← aqa 'elder brother'), qızaq'u (← qızaq'a 'elder sister'), açu (← aça 'father'), and an'u (← ana 'mother'). There are two possessive suffixes, first and second person -(ı)ñ and third person -(s)ı, but these suffixes are largely not used outside of kinship terms (anañ, anası 'mother'), similar to the concept of inalienable possessions. Four kinship nouns have irregular 1st and 2nd person forms by eliding the final vowel and using the consonantic variant: aqa → aqı 'elder brother'.

=== Verbs ===
Western Yugur verbal system, like Salar, is characterized by contact-induced (namely, under the influence of Chinese) loss of person-number copular markers in finite verb forms, e.g. contrast the sentence “I have eaten enough” Men tozdı in Western Yugur with the Uzbek equivalent Men to’y-dïm; the latter has a first-person marker suffix -(I)m attached to the verb while the equivalent Western Yugur sentence does not.

== Vocabulary ==
Western Yugur has retained many words from East Old Turkic language and is the only Turkic language that preserved the anticipating counting system, known from Old Turkic. In this system, upper decimals are used, i.e., per otus (per 'one', otus 'thirty') means lit. 'one (on the way to) thirty', is 21.

For centuries, the Western Yugur language has been in contact with Mongolic languages, Tibetan, and Chinese, and as a result has adopted a large number of loanwords from these languages, as well as grammatical features. Chinese dialects neighboring the areas where Yugur is spoken have influenced the Yugur language, giving it loanwords.
