= Josi (given name) =

Josi is a given name. Notable people with the given name include:

- Josi S. Kilpack (born 1974), American novelist
- Josi W. Konski, Cuban-born American film producer
- Josi Meier (1926–2006), Swiss politician and feminist
- Josef "Josi" Singer (1923–2009), Israeli President of Technion – Israel Institute of Technology

== See also ==
- Josi, surname
