= Be with dot below =

Cyrillic letter used in a 1920s Khakas alphabet

- Б̣ б̣
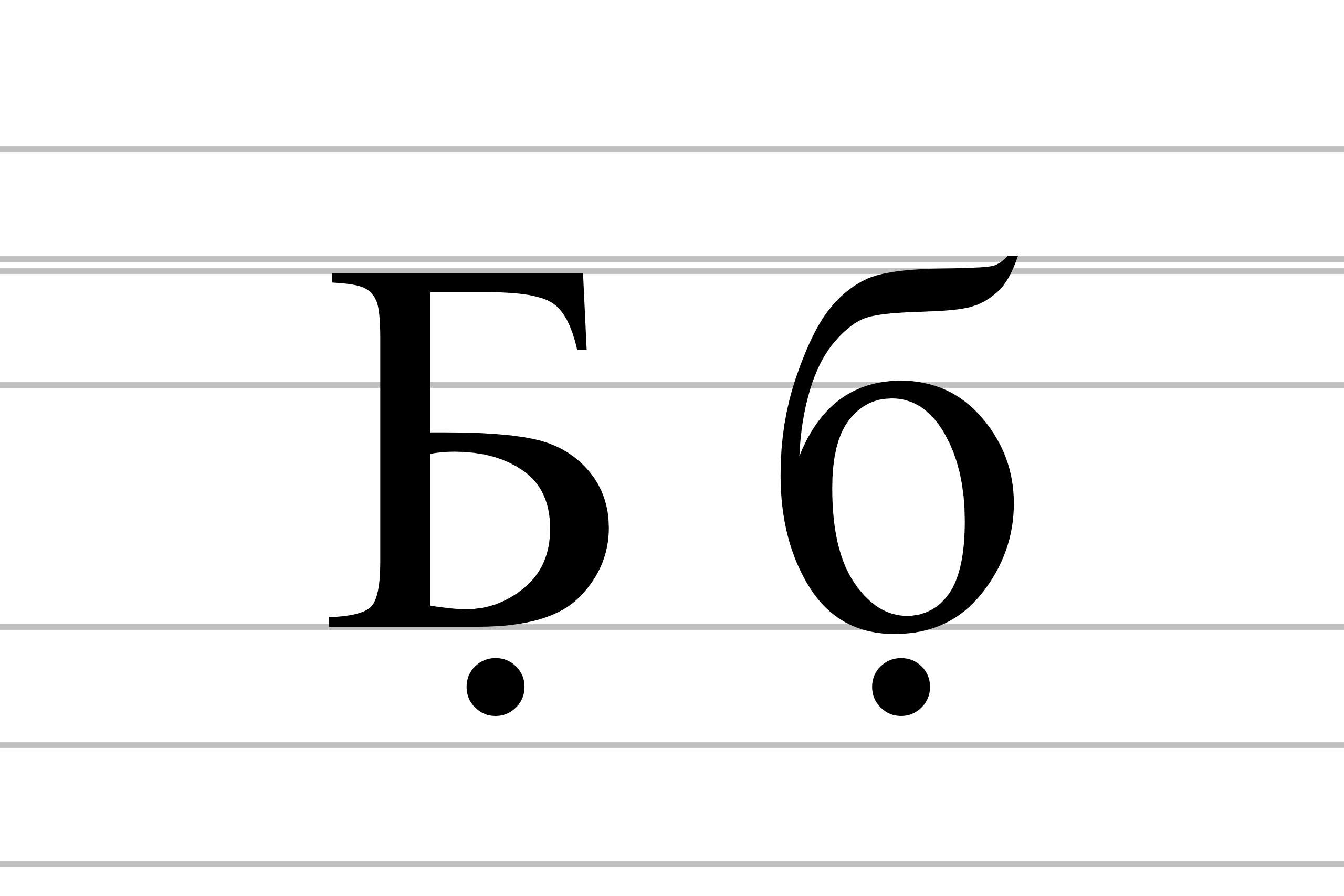

Usage
- Writing system: Cyrillic
- Type: Alphabetic
- Sound values: [v]

Be with dot below (Б̣, б̣; italics: Б̣, б̣) is a letter of the Cyrillic script.

It was found in the Khakas alphabet project of M. I. Raikov in the 1920s.

== In Unicode ==
There is no precomposed character codepoint for this grapheme. It is generated using U+0411 Б CYRILLIC CAPITAL LETTER BE combined with U+0323 ◌̣ COMBINING DOT BELOW.

== See also ==
- Be (Cyrillic)
- Cyrillic script in Unicode
