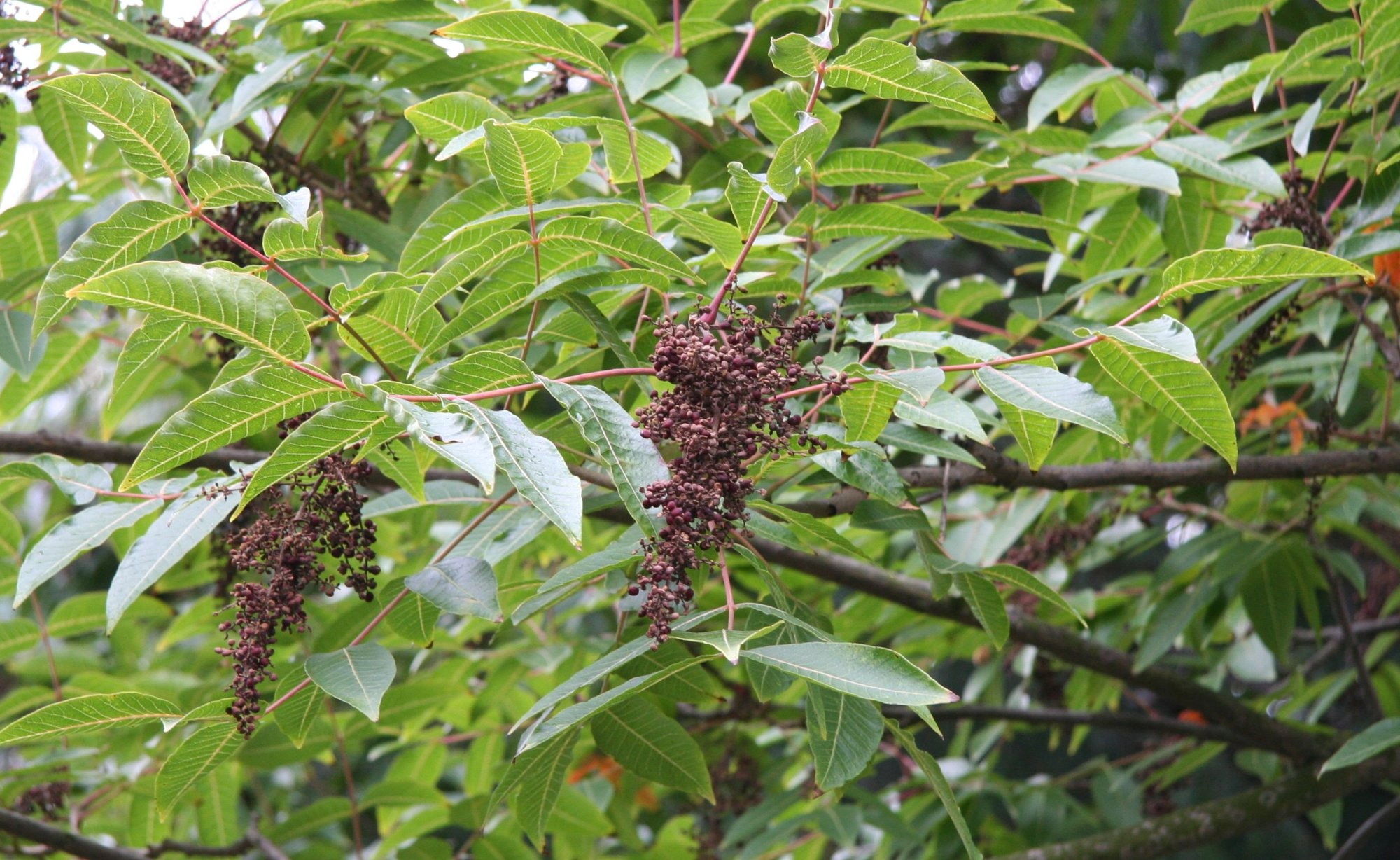
- In fruit

Conservation status
- Least Concern (IUCN 3.1)

Scientific classification
- Kingdom: Plantae
- Clade: Tracheophytes
- Clade: Angiosperms
- Clade: Eudicots
- Clade: Rosids
- Order: Sapindales
- Family: Anacardiaceae
- Genus: Rhus
- Species: R. potaninii

Binomial name
- Rhus potaninii Maxim.

Synonyms
- Rhus henryi Diels

= Rhus potaninii =

Species of plant

Rhus potaninii, the Chinese varnish tree, Chinese sumac (names it shares with other species), Potanin's sumac, or Potanin's lacquer tree, is a species of flowering plant in the family Anacardiaceae. It is native to central and southern China. A deciduous tree reaching 12 m (39 ft), it is typically found growing on hill and mountain slopes, in forests and thickets at elevations from 900 to 2,500 m (3,000 to 8,200 ft) above sea level. It is named for its collector, Grigory Potanin. Valued for its rounded crown and vibrant red fall foliage, it is available from commercial suppliers.
