= Grigory Potanin =

Russian explorer and orientalist (1835–1920)

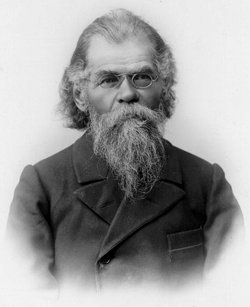
Grigory Nikolayaevich Potanin

Grigory Nikolayevich Potanin (Russian: Григорий Николаевич Потанин; 4 October 1835 – 6 June 1920) was a Russian botanist, ethnographer, and natural historian. He was an explorer of Inner Asia and was the first to catalogue many of the area's native plants. Potanin was also an author and a political activist who aligned himself with the Siberian regionalist movement.

== Life ==
=== Early life ===
Potanin attended a Page Corps in Omsk, a military school for children from wealthy families.

Potanin initially travelled to Siberia while serving with a Cossack division in Altai in the 1850s. He returned to Saint Petersburg in 1858 to study Mathematical Physics. He was arrested for his participation in student demonstrations in 1861, and expelled from Saint Petersburg University. After spending three months in Petropavlovskaya fortress, he returned to Siberia.

After leaving prison, he travelled to Siberia with Nikolai M. Yadrintsev, where he began to work as a publisher. Due to his support for regionality and rights for Siberian peoples, he was arrested on charges of supporting separatism for Siberia in 1867. Convicted, he was sentenced to three years in prison and fifteen of hard labour. His hard labour was reduced to five years, and during those five years he wrote a book on the history of Siberia.

In 1876, Potanin led an expedition into Mongolia. The expedition spent the winter of 1876–1877 in Kobdo, with bitter cold and few provisions. While there, the expedition collected various biological specimens and conducted ethnological research. The expedition split into two parts upon leaving the city in the middle of March 1877. Some members went to Han-Chai, while Potanin and some others left for Hami and Uliastai.

=== 1884–1886 expedition ===
Potanin journeyed to northern China from 1884 to 1886 with Augustus Ivonovitch Skassi. His expedition departed Peking on 13 May 1884. The expedition travelled first over the U-tai-shan mountains, arriving in Hohhot. The expedition left Hohhot and travelled across the Yellow River into the Ordos Desert. They travelled to the ruins of Borobalgassun and from there on to Lang-chau. He encountered a Turkic people called the Salars, and Potanin recorded information about their language. He then spent time recording the cultural practices of the Amdos Mongols. The party then travelled to Si-ning and met its governor, who authorised their travel into eastern Tibet. They departed Si-ning and went to Ming-chau, crossing the high altitude Tibetan Plateau, where they recorded information on the native vegetation. There, the expedition visited Gui-dui, Bóunan, Labrang and Josi before reaching Ming-chau. The expedition ran out of supplies in Sung-pang-ting, and turned back towards Lang-chau, stopping in Lung-an-fu, Ven-hsien, Tse-chau, Hung-chang-fu and Di-dao. They spent the winter of 1885 in the Kumbum Monastery, before returning to Russia.

While there, he was the first foreigner to report on the East Yugur and West Yugur languages, making a glossary that was published with assistance from Vasily Radlov in his book on the expedition, The Tangut-Tibetan Borderlands of China and Central Mongolia in 1893. The book also contains a language glossary for the Salar language.

=== Later life ===
In 1889, Potanin led the group that formed the first University in Russian Asia, Tomsk State University, in Tomsk.

Potanin was arrested in 1905 for his support of the Revolution of 1905.

Potanin was a leading light in the oblastniki which aimed at some degree of regional self-government for Siberia, but this movement lacked any party or regional organisation, and was limited to a small group of intellectuals mainly based at Tomsk University. It was here that they organised a Regional Conference in August 1917, and a Congress in October to draft a constitution for an autonomous Siberia. Potanin was elected chairman of the Provisional Siberian Council 8 December 1918 at Tomsk by delegates from the major centres of Siberia. But this assembly was largely dominated by the Esery (Social Revolutionaries, SRs), and Potanin resented being used as a mere figurehead and resigned in protest 12 January 1918 as the first Siboduma convened. Subsequently he abandoned the idea of Siberian autonomy in favour of a strong central authority able to restore order and defeat the Bolsheviks. The members of Siboduma dispersed or were rounded up by local Red Guards on the night of 25–26 January 1918. Potanin died at Tomsk in June 1920.

=== Tribute ===
Potaninskaya Street in Novosibirsk, Russia, is named after him.

A species of Chinese skink, Scincella potanini, is named in his honor.

The fish Gymnocypris potanini Herzenstein, 1891 was named after him.

In 1882, botanist Karl Maximovich published Potaninia, a genus of flowering plants from Mongolia, belonging to the family Rosaceae and it was named in his honour.

In 1889, Maximovich also published the Chinese tree Rhus potaninii, which glows like a red banner in autumn also bears his name.

Also the asteroid 9915 Potanin, discovered in 1977, bears his name.
