= Dahe Township, Gansu =

Dahexiang 大河乡
- Township
- Location within Gansu Location within China
- Coordinates: 39°0′8″N 99°30′10″E
- Country: China
- Province: Gansu
- Prefecture: Zhangye
- County: Sunan Yugur Autonomous County

Government
  - Township deputy head: Lian Zongpeng (as of 2021)

Area
  - Total: 3,329 km^{2} (1,285 sq mi)
- Elevation: 3,013 m (9,885 ft)

Population (2018)
  - Total: 4,401
  - Density: 1.322/km^{2} (3.424/sq mi)
- Postal code: 734000
- Area code: 0936

Dahe Township (simplified Chinese: 大河乡; traditional Chinese: 大河鄉; pinyin: Dàhé Xiāng) is a township of Sunan Yugur Autonomous County, Zhangye, Gansu, China. Dahe Township is located within the Heihe river basin, in the Qilian Mountains, along Gansu Provincial Highway 220. Most of the township consists of grassland, which is home to around 100 red deer that eat the township's gojis in the midsummer. The township is home to large Yugur population, which comprises about 46% of its population, and is also home to over 200 Tibetans. The township is home to the Ba'ersi Sheng Mountain Scenic area (Chinese: 巴尔斯圣山景区). Animal husbandry comprises a large portion of the township's economy, and sheep herding in particular plays a prominent role in the local economy.

The township spans an area of 3,329 square kilometres (1,285 mi^{2}), and has a population of 4,401 as of 2018.

== History ==
In 2019, archeologists found a number of rock paintings, many depicting deer, which may date back to approximately 1500 BCE.

== Geography ==
Dahe Township is located in the middle of the Hexi Corridor, bordered by Kangle to the east, Qifeng Tibetan Ethnic Township to the west, Qilian County in Qinghai to the south, and Gaotai County and Linze County to the west. The township spans 90 kilometres (56 mi) from east to west, and 70 kilometres (43 mi) from north to south. Much of Dahe Township's area is grassland, however, there is a significant amount of forests in the township. The average elevation in Dahe Township is approximately 2,660 metres (8,730 ft) above sea level.

Major mountains in the township include Yumu Mountain (Chinese: 榆木山; pinyin: Yúmù Shān), Heishan Peak (Chinese: 黑山顶; pinyin: Hēishān Dǐng; lit. 'black mountain peak'), Jiudungou Ridge (Chinese: 九墩沟梁; pinyin: Jiǔdūngōu Liáng), Da Mountain (Chinese: 大山; pinyin: Dà Shān; lit. 'big mountain'), Binggou Peak (Chinese: 冰沟顶; pinyin: Bīnggōu Dǐng), Shijuligou Head (Chinese: 石居里沟脑; pinyin: Shíjūlǐgōu Nǎo), Hongshizuizhong Ridge (Chinese: 红石嘴中梁; pinyin: Hóngshízuǐzhōng Liáng), and Xihong Geda (Chinese: 西红疙瘩; pinyin: Xīhóng Gēda).

Major rivers that flow through Dahe Township include Longchang River (Chinese: 隆畅河; pinyin: Lóngchàng Hé), Da River (Chinese: 大河; pinyin: Dà Hé; lit. 'big river'), Bailang River (Chinese: 摆浪河; pinyin: Bǎilàng Hé), Shuiguan River (Chinese: 水关河; pinyin: Shuǐguān Hé), Xi River (Chinese: 西河; pinyin: Xī Hé; lit. 'west river'), Shihuiguan River (Chinese: 石灰关河; pinyin: Shíhuīguān Hé), and Maying River (Chinese: 马营河; pinyin: Mǎyíng Hé).

=== Flora and fauna ===
Wild animals native to the township include Thorold's deer, water deer, wild ox, argali, sheep, bears, panthers, wolves, lynx, snowcocks, and the blue eared pheasant. Plants native to the township include Saussurea involucrata, rhubarb, Hansenia weberbaueriana (syn. Notopterygium incisum), yedangshen (Chinese: 野党参; pinyin: yědǎngshēn), and Bupleuri Radix. Many plants found native to the area are used in Traditional Chinese Medicine. Dahe Township also has an abundance of mushrooms and fat choy.

=== Climate ===
The township has an average annual temperature of 3 °C (37 °F), annual precipitation ranging from 150 millimetres (5.9 in) to 300 millimetres (12 in), an average of 2,680 annual hours of sunshine annually, and between 90 and 120 frost-free days per year.

== Administrative divisions ==
Dahe Township has jurisdiction over the following 18 villages:

- Guanghua (Chinese: 光华村)
- Datan (Chinese: 大滩村)
- Hongwan (Chinese: 红湾村)
- Dongling (Chinese: 东岭村)
- Xiling (Chinese: 西岭村)
- Xichache (Chinese: 西岔河村)
- Xihe (Chinese: 西河村)
- Yingpan (Chinese: 营盘村)
- Tianqiaowan (Chinese: 天桥湾村)
- Songmutan (Chinese: 松木滩村)
- Laohugou (Chinese: 老虎沟村)
- Dacha (Chinese: 大岔村)
- Baizhuangzi (Chinese: 白庄子村)
- Lamawan (Chinese: 喇嘛湾村)
- Xiliugou (Chinese: 西柳沟村)
- Jiusiwan (Chinese: 旧寺湾村)
- Hongbianzi (Chinese: 红边子村)
- Jinchanghe (Chinese: 金畅河村)

== Demographics ==
=== Ethnic groups ===
Dahe Township is a majority minority area, with the largest pluralities being the township's Han Chinese and Yugur populations, which both comprise about 46% of the township's population. Besides these two groups, there is also a sizable Tibetan population, as well as smaller amounts of Hui, Monguor, Mongol, and Miao peoples.

	2017		2018	
Ethnicity	Number	Percent	Number	Percent
Han Chinese	2,014	46.10%	2,018	45.85%
Yugur	1,992	45.59%	2,012	45.72%
Tibetan	224	5.13%	224	5.09%
Hui	78	1.79%	83	1.89%
Monguor	56	1.28%	58	1.32%
Mongol	4	0.09%	5	0.11%
Miao	1	0.02%	1	0.02%
Total	4,369	100.00%	4,401	100.00%

Previous figures have put the Yugur population in Dahe Township at about 3,000 people, and noted its spread across numerous villages within the township. The Yugurs of Dahe Township speak a Turkic language, as opposed to many Yugurs to its east, who speak a Mongolic language. Yugurs in Dahe Township belong to the Mountain Yugur, or taglıg, subgroup.

=== Income ===
The county's per capita disposable income totaled 20,129.98 renminbi in 2020, a 6.3% increase from 2019.

In the early 1980s the township's average income demographics were studied closely for a book named Village, Market and Well-being.

== Economy ==
Animal husbandry is a major portion of the township's economy, producing 49.64 million renminbi (RMB) worth of income in 2017. Sheep raising in particular is a major component of Dahe Township's economy, employing many. The town has a veterinary station to aid local herders. Dahe Township has a water conservation program to provide local herders with water.

Agriculture represents a much smaller, although still significant, portion of Dahe Township's economy, generating 5.21 million in income in 2017. Walnuts are also grown in the area.

Dahe Township also has a variety of mineral deposits, including coal, jade, serpentinite, copper, gold, gypsum, and limestone. However, Dahe is disputed mining site.

== Education ==
Dahe has one primary school in the center of its administrative boundaries.

== Culture ==
Yugur shamanism was practiced in the township until 1977, when the region's last shaman died.
