= Old Uyghur script =

Historic Aramaic-based alphabet

- 𐽳𐽶𐽲𐽶𐽾 wyɣwr 'Uyghur' in Old Uyghur
- Script type: Alphabet or abjad
- Period: ca.700s–1800s
- Direction: Horizontal and vertical writing in East Asian scripts, vertical writing Vertical (left-to-right); Horizontal (right-to-left), used in modern printing, especially in multi-lingual publications
- Languages: Old Uyghur, Western Yugur

Related scripts
- Parent systems: Egyptian hieroglyphs: Proto-Sinaitic; Phoenician; Aramaic; Syriac; Sogdian; Old Uyghur script
- Child systems: Traditional Mongolian alphabet

ISO 15924
- ISO 15924: Ougr (143), Old Uyghur

Unicode
- Unicode alias: Old Uyghur
- Unicode range: U+10F70–U+10FAF; Final Accepted Script Proposal

The Old Uyghur script is a Turkic script that was used for writing Old Uyghur, a variety of Old Turkic spoken in Turpan and Gansu that is the ancestor of the modern Western Yugur language. The term "Old Uyghur" used for this alphabet is misleading because Qocho, the Uyghur (Yugur) kingdom created in 843, originally used the Old Turkic alphabet. The Uyghur adopted this "Old Uyghur" script from local inhabitants when they migrated into Turfan after 840. It was an adaptation of the Aramaic alphabet used for texts with Buddhist, Manichaean and Christian content for 700–800 years in Turpan. The last known manuscripts are dated to the 18th century. This was the prototype for the Mongolian and Manchu alphabets. The Old Uyghur alphabet was brought to Mongolia by Tata-tonga.

The Old Uyghur script was used between the 8th and 17th centuries primarily in the Tarim Basin of Central Asia, located in present-day Xinjiang Uygur Autonomous Region, China. The script flourished through the 15th century in Central Asia and parts of Iran, but it was eventually replaced by the Arabic script in the 16th century. Its usage was continued in Gansu through the 17th century.

== History ==
The Old Uyghur script developed from writing traditions ultimately derived from the Aramaic script through the intermediary of the Sogdian script. Archaeological evidence indicates that early Turkic societies possessed at least two writing systems, one being the Old Uyghur alphabet, and the other being the Turkic Runic script. Both stem from Sogdian models based on the Aramaic (and later Syriac) alphabet. Sogdian communities active along the Eurasian trade routes played an important role in transmitting literacy to Turkic populations, and Sogdian writing was already employed for official purposes in the Turkic Khaganate in the late 6th century, as evidenced by the Bugut inscription. A cursive form of the Sogdian script that developed in the late 7th or early 8th century was subsequently adapted for Turkic languages and became the basis of the Old Uyghur alphabet. The script became closely associated with the Uyghurs, whose culture was strongly influenced by Sogdian merchants and religious communities. Variants of the script were employed for different religious traditions, including Buddhist, Manichaean, and Christian texts, reflecting broader patterns of script usage in medieval Central Asia.

The Old Uyghur script was used extensively in the West Uyghur kingdom between the mid-ninth and early thirteenth centuries, and during the period of Mongol rule over the region, between the thirteenth and fourteenth centuries. Documents containing the script have also been discovered at Dunhuang and Khara-Khoto, written by the inhabitants of the West Uighur kingdom and their descendants. Some documents might be dated as late as the seventeenth century. According to the 11th-century scholar Mahmud al-Kashgari, the script was used for diplomatic correspondence between Kashgar and China and likely also for everyday administrative affairs among non-Islamic Turkic groups.

The use of the script appears to have been largely confined to the eastern Turkic regions before the 13th century. After the conversion of the Kara-Khanid Khanate to Islam, the Arabic script became the principal script for writing Turkic in Muslim lands west of the Pamirs, as demonstrated by commercial documents and literary works such as the Kutadgu Bilig. The script gained renewed political significance during the Mongol conquest led by Genghis Khan. According to traditional accounts, after his defeat of the Naiman in 1204 he captured an Uyghur official known in Chinese sources as Tata-tonga, who was ordered to teach the Mongolian princes to write using the Uyghur script. Adapted for Mongolian, this writing system became the "Mongol Official Alphabet", which was essentially the Uyghur alphabet in Mongolian administrative use. The Mongols carried this script westward across the Pamirs and established it as the official writing system in regions such as Transoxiana and Persia. Although it was initially used there to write Mongolian, it remained the official alphabet even after Turkish replaced Mongolian as the principal administrative language. As a result, the 15th-century Turkish manuscripts written in so-called "Uyghur script" were produced in this Mongol administrative alphabet, rather than in a continuous scribal tradition directly inherited from earlier Uyghur usage. No Uyghur-script texts dating to the period between the Turkic conversion to Islam and the Mongol conquest, that employ the earlier orthographic system with its elaborate dots and marks, have survived. In western parts of the Mongol domains the script survived primarily as a formal court script even after Turkic languages became the main administrative languages. By the 15th century its use had declined significantly, and manuscripts written in the script were sometimes accompanied by interlinear transcriptions in Arabic script to facilitate reading. One of the latest known examples is a proclamation issued by Mehmed II following his victory over Uzun Hasan in 1473, written in the Uyghur-derived script with an accompanying Arabic transcription.

== Characteristics ==
The Old Uyghur alphabet is a cursive-joining alphabet with features of an abjad. Letters join together at a baseline, and have both isolated and contextual forms, when they occur in initial, medial or final positions. The script is traditionally written vertically, from top to bottom and left to right. After the 14th century, some examples in a horizontal direction can be found. Words are separated by spaces. Like the Sogdian alphabet (technically, an abjad), the Old Uyghur tended to use matres lectionis for the short vowels as well as for the long ones. The practice of leaving short vowels unrepresented was almost completely abandoned. Thus, while ultimately deriving from a Semitic abjad, the Old Uyghur alphabet can be said to have been largely "alphabetized".

== Tables ==
Unicode text might render incorrectly depending on the typeface version installed.

=== Letters ===
Letters
Letter name (Note: Ancestral Aramaic name.)	Image				Transliteration	Normalization	Sound (IPA)	Prototype in the Sogdian (sutra) script	Derived grapheme in the Mongolian script
Letter name	Isolate	Initial	Medial	Final	Transliteration	Normalization	Sound (IPA)	Prototype in the Sogdian (sutra) script	Derived grapheme in the Mongolian script
Aleph					ʾ	(see vowels)		𐼰 ʾ	/; (a / e / o / u / ö / ü)
Beth					β	w / v		𐼱 b	(ē / w)
Gimel (Note: Allophonic with heth.)					γ	γ		𐼲 g	(q / γ)
Heth (Note: Allophonic with gimel.)				(Note: In some cases.)	x, q	x, q		𐼶 h	(q / γ)
Dotted heth (Note: Single- or double-dotted in order to distinguish it from gimel, but not consistently and actually sometimes used in place of gimel.)				Dotted	x, q	x, q			(q / γ)
Waw					w	(see vowels)		𐼴 w	(o / u / ö / ü / w)
Zayin		(Note: Final shaped, and not joining its succeeding letter.)	(Note: Final shaped, and only joining its preceding letter.)		z	z		𐼵 z	—; —; (s)
Dotted zayin (Note: Single- or double-dotted.)						ž		𐼵𐽇 ž	—
Yodh					y	y, (see vowels)	(see vowels)	𐼷 y	(i / ǰ / y)
Kaph					k	k ~ g (Note: Allophones.)		𐼸 k	(k / g)
Lamedh					δ	d		𐼹 l (δ)	—; (t / d)
Mem					m	m		𐼺 m	(m)
Nun					n	n		𐼻 n	/; /; (n)
Samekh					s	s		𐼼 s	(s / š)
Pe					p	b, p		𐼾 p	(b)
Sadhe					c	č	/cç/	𐼿 ṣ (c)	/; —; (č / ǰ)
Resh					r	r		𐽀 r	(r)
Shin					s	s		𐽁 š	(s / š)
Double-dotted shin					š	š			(s / š)
Taw					t	t		𐽂 t	(t / d)
Lesh (hooked resh)					l	l			(l)

=== Vowels ===
Vowels
Letter(s)	Initial	Medial	Final	Transliteration	Normalization	Sound (IPA)
Aleph (ʾ)				(ʾ)ʾ	a	
Aleph (ʾ)				ʾ	e	
Yodh (y)	Aleph+			(ʾ)y	ï / i	
Waw (w)	Aleph+			(ʾ)w	o / u	
Waw (+yodh)	Aleph+	(Note: Initial syllable.)		(ʾ)w(y)	ö / ü	
Waw	—	(Note: Subsequent syllables.)		w	ö / ü	

== Gallery ==
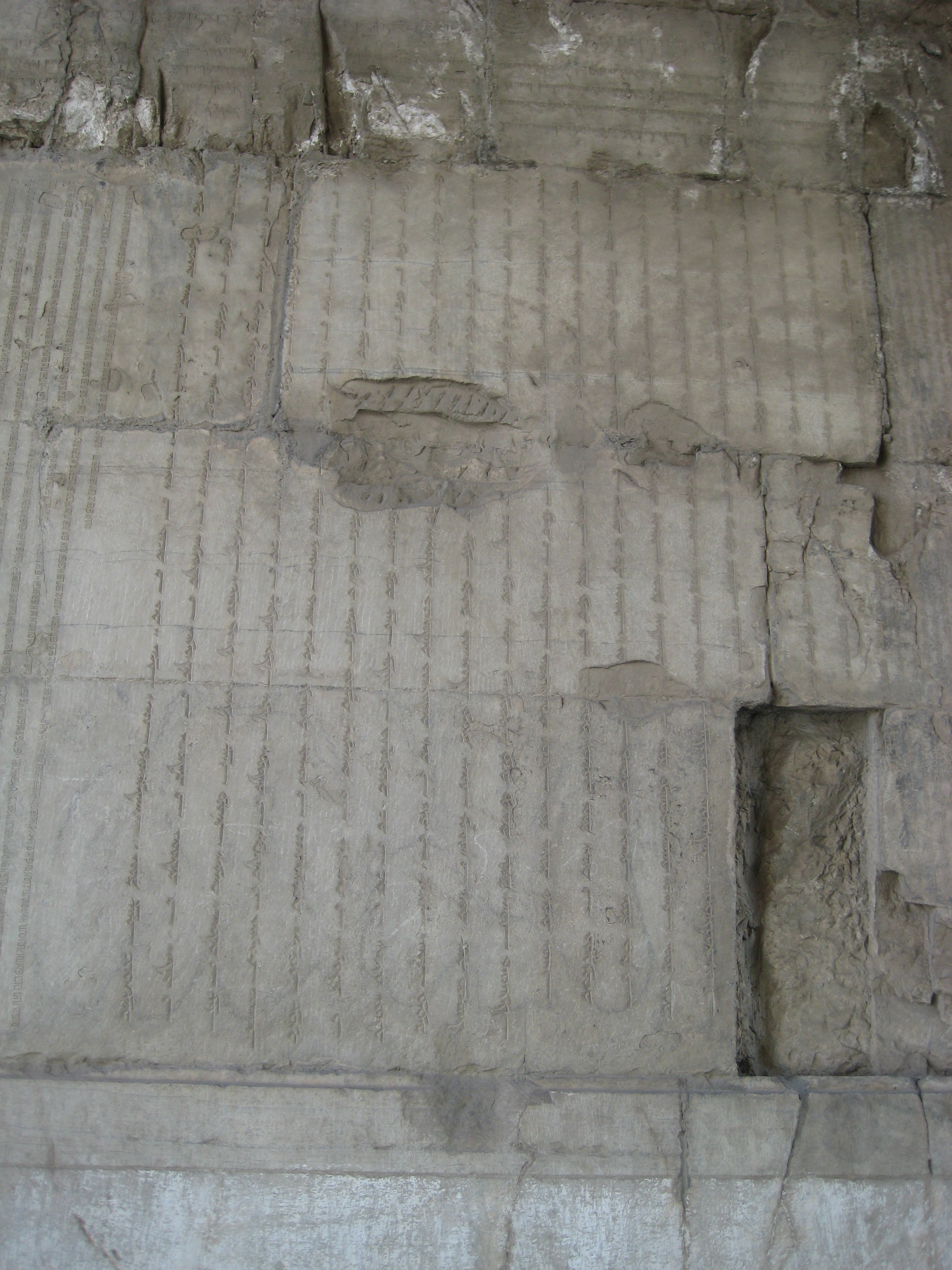
Yuan dynasty Buddhist inscription written in Old Uyghur on the west wall of the Cloud Platform at Juyong Pass

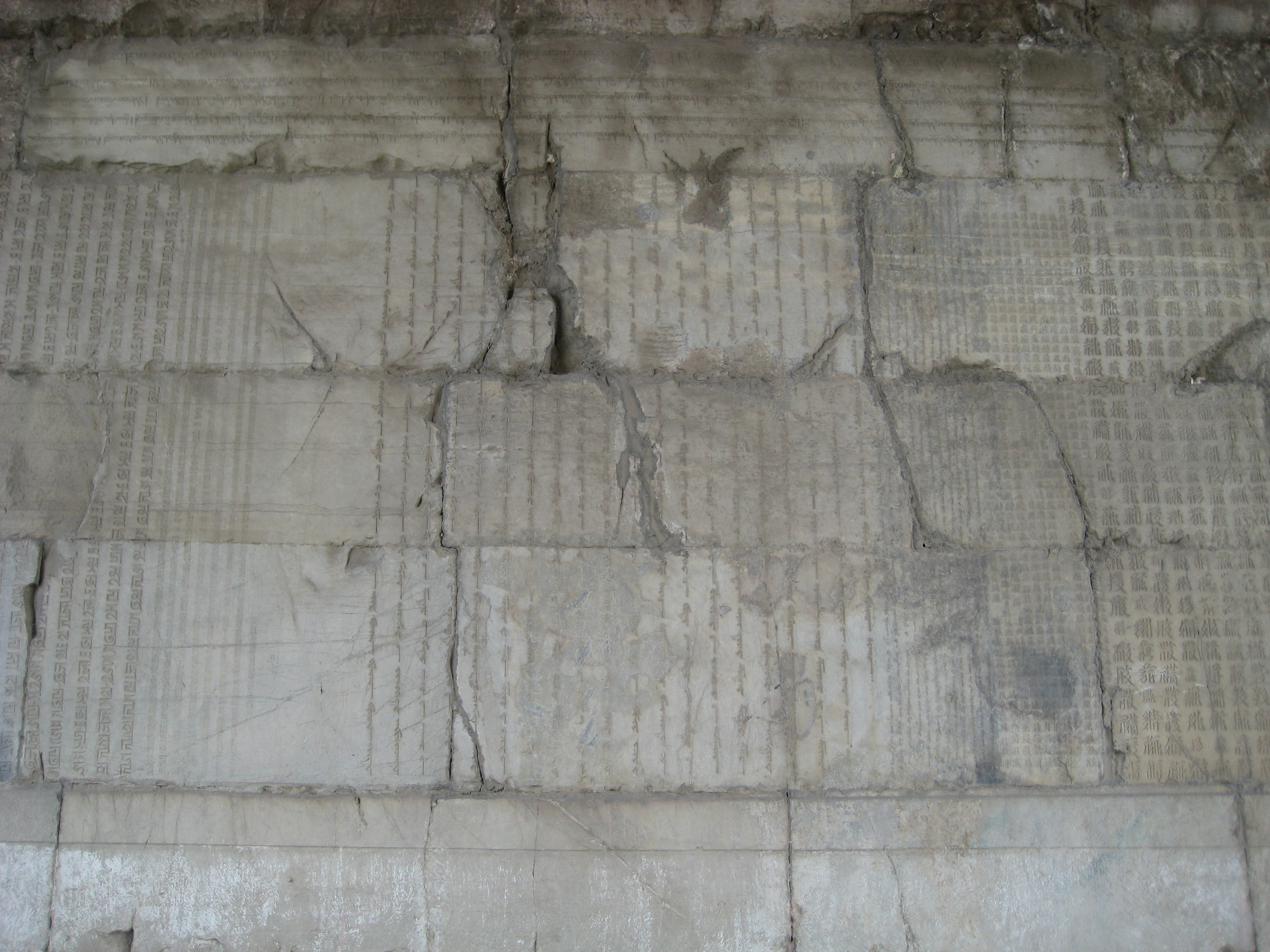
Yuan dynasty Buddhist inscription written in Old Uyghur on the east wall of the Cloud Platform at Juyong Pass

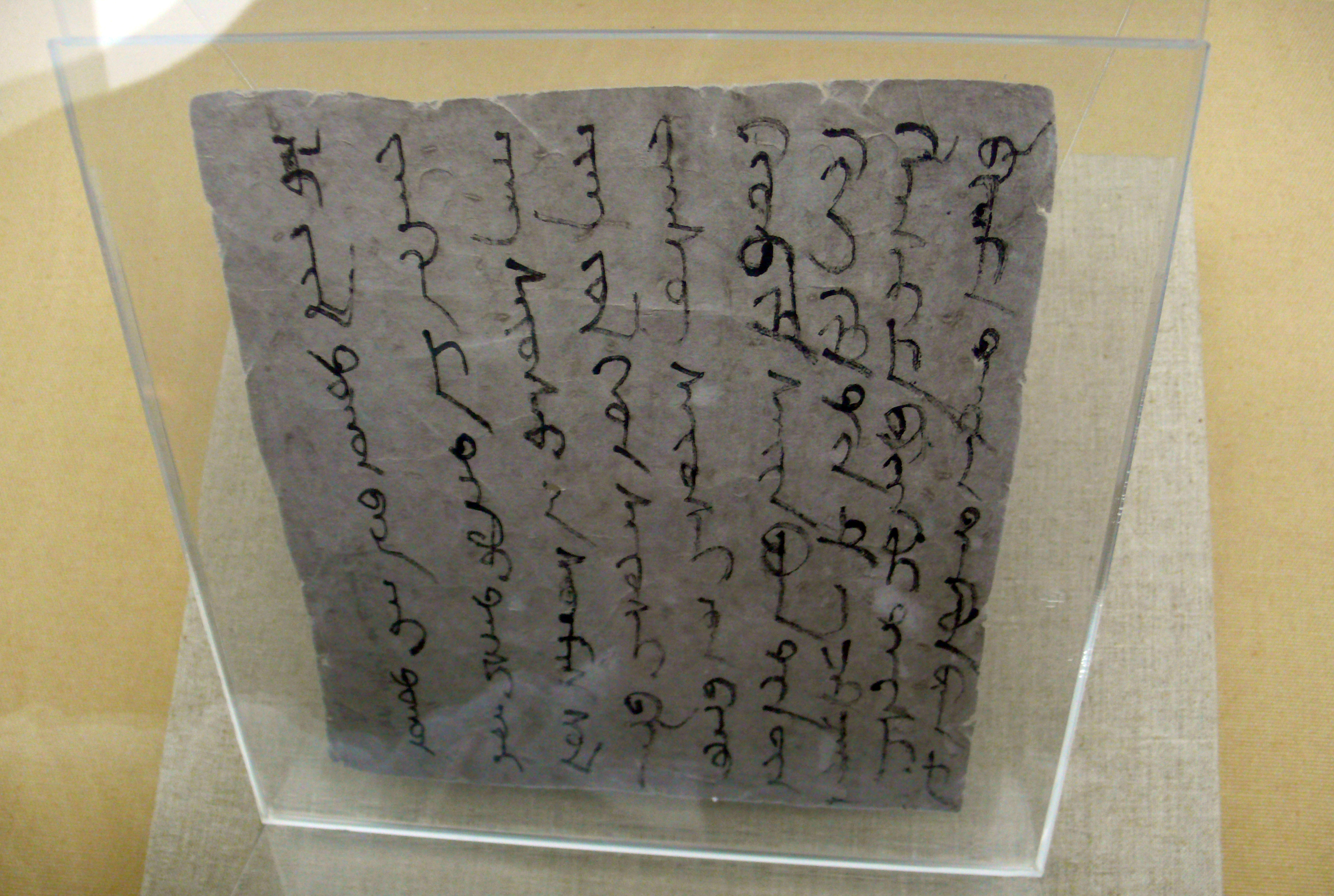
Slave contract

Contract on taxation

Ming era text from volume with accompanying Chinese translation

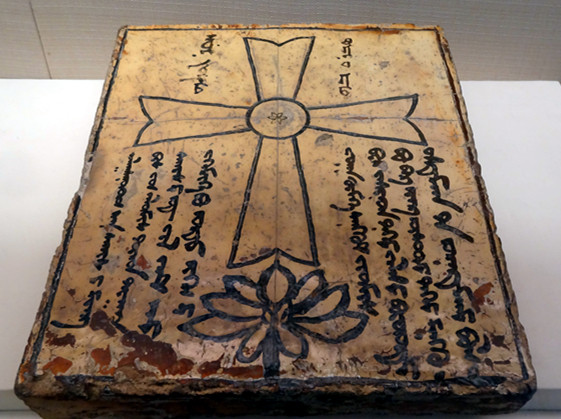
Yuan era epitaph

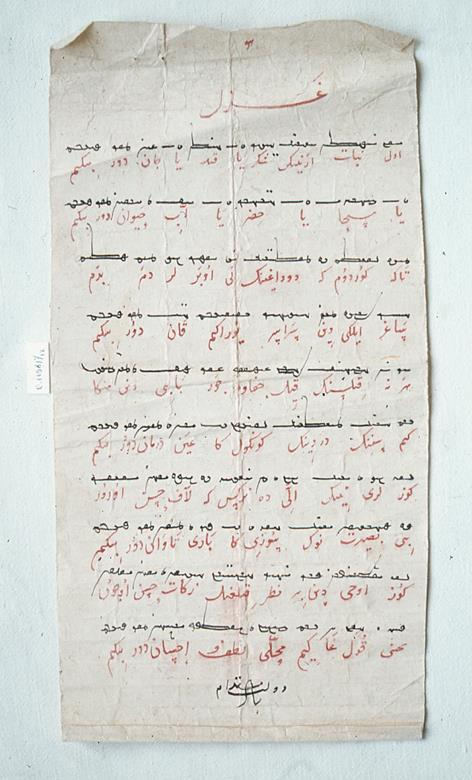
Mehmed II's Fetihname (Declaration of conquest) after the Battle of Otlukbeli

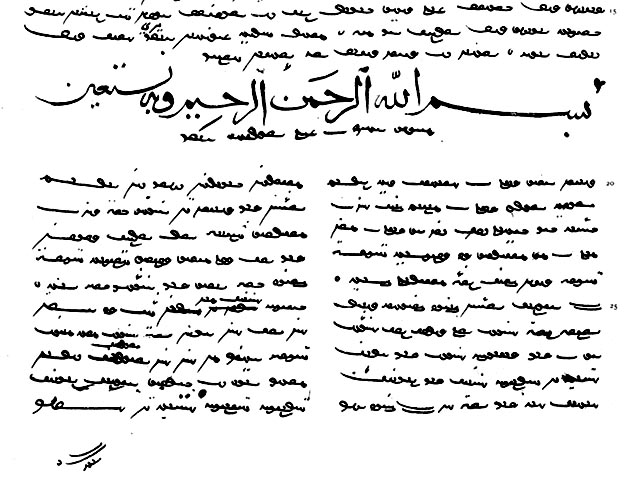
An Old Uyghur excerpt from Qutadgu Bilig, written left-to-right, showing Arabic influence.

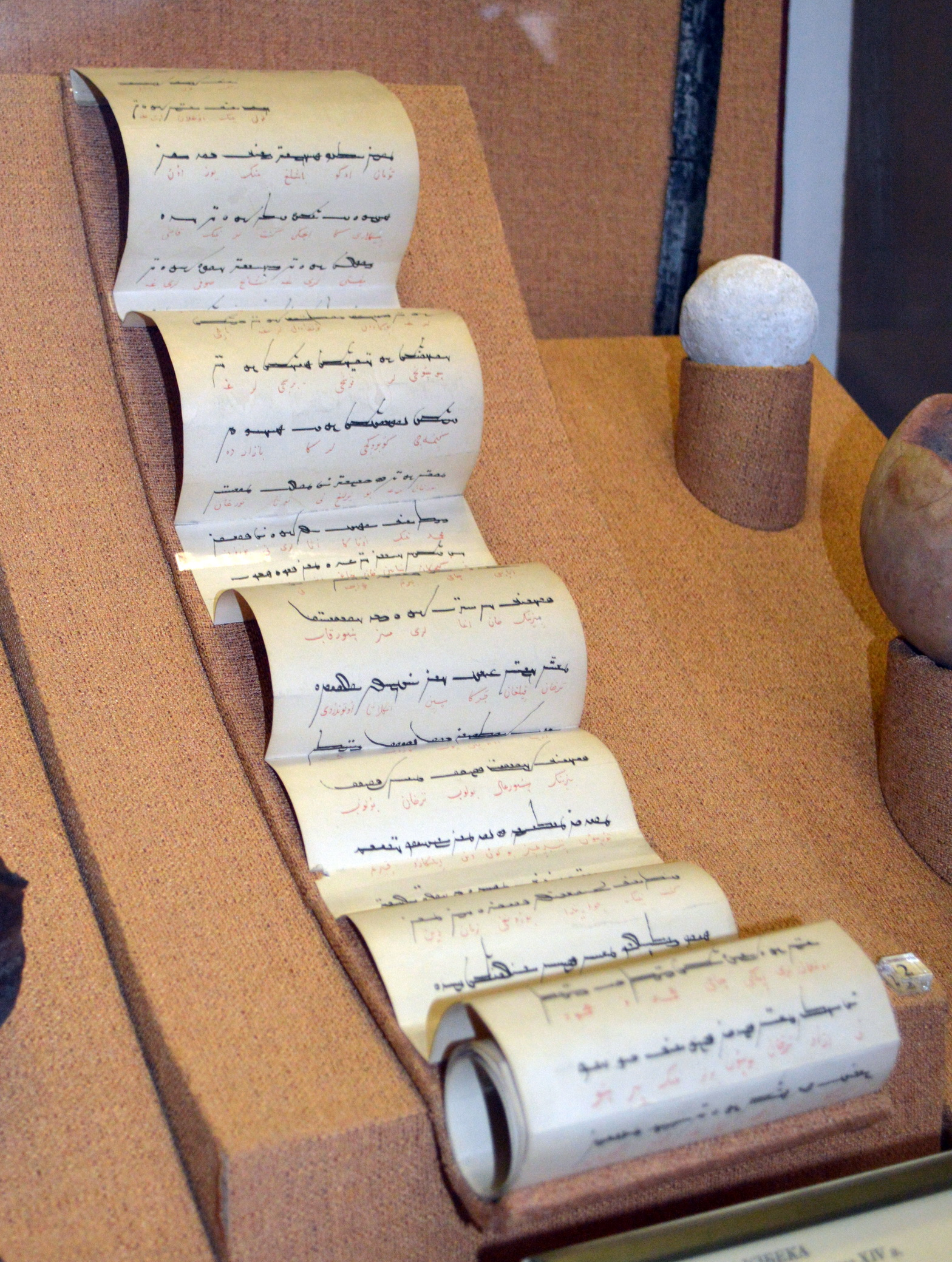
Jarlig of Temür Qutlugh

== Unicode ==
The Old Uyghur alphabet was added to the Unicode Standard in September, 2021 with the release of version 14.0.

The Unicode block for Old Uyghur is U+10F70–U+10FAF:

Old Uyghur^{[1]}^{[2]} Official Unicode Consortium code chart (PDF)
	0	1	2	3	4	5	6	7	8	9	A	B	C	D	E	F
U+10F7x	𐽰	𐽱	𐽲	𐽳	𐽴	𐽵	𐽶	𐽷	𐽸	𐽹	𐽺	𐽻	𐽼	𐽽	𐽾	𐽿
U+10F8x	𐾀	𐾁	𐾂	𐾃	𐾄	𐾅	𐾆	𐾇	𐾈	𐾉						
U+10F9x																
U+10FAx																
Notes 1.As of Unicode version 18.0 2.Grey areas indicate non-assigned code points

== See also ==
- Western Yugur language
