= Sunan Yugur Autonomous County =

Sunan County 肃南裕固族自治县
- Autonomous county
- 肃南裕固族自治县; Sunan Yugur Autonomous County
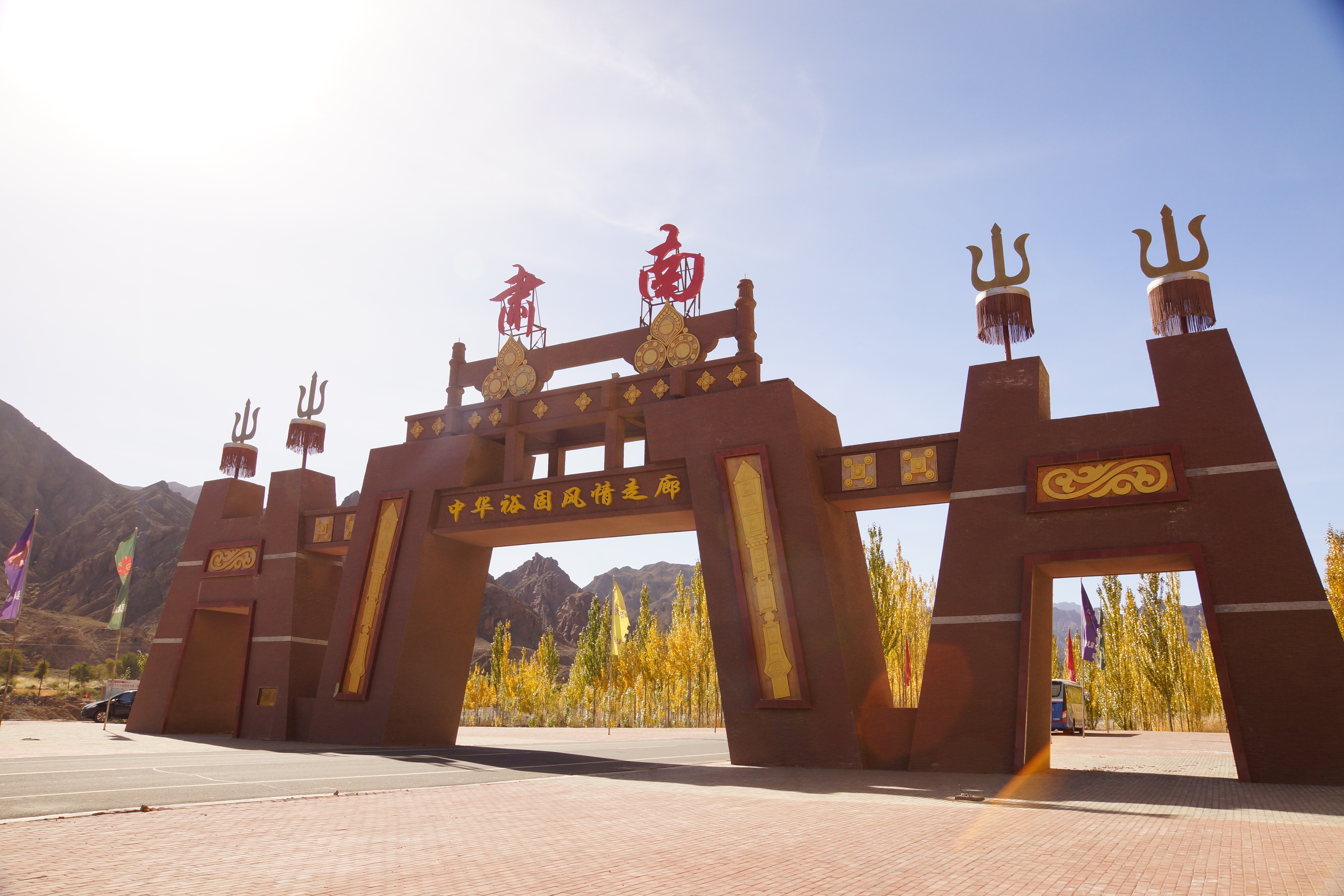
- Sunan gate, on the Chinese Yugur Scenic Corridor

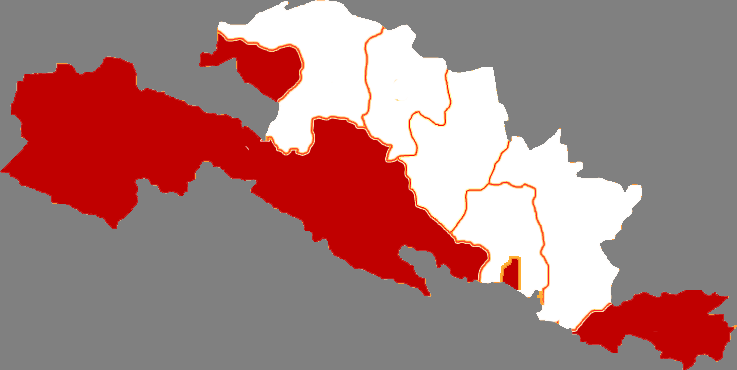
- Sunan in Zhangye

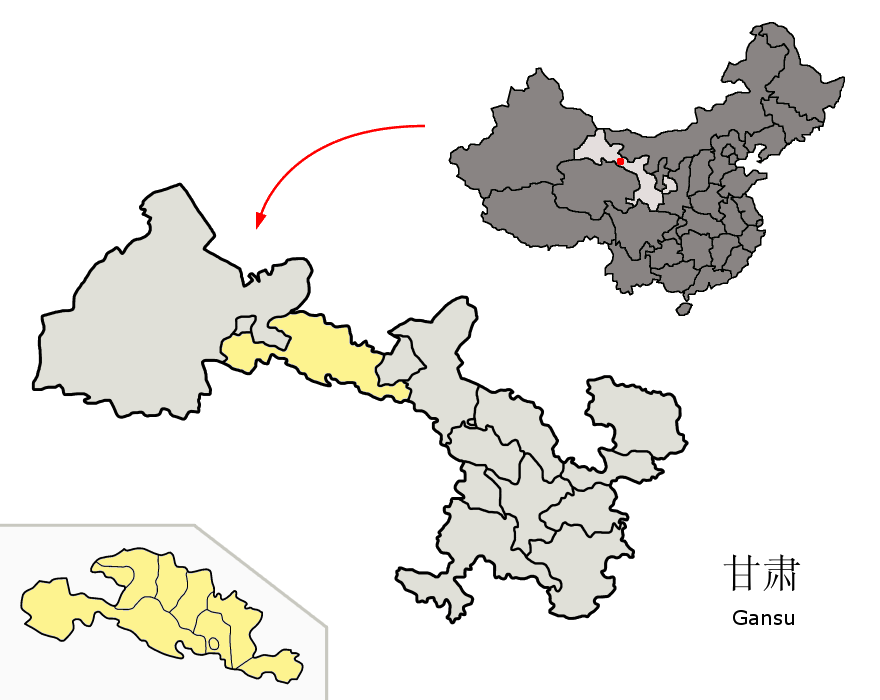
- Zhangye in Gansu

- Location of the seat in Gansu Sunan (China)
- Coordinates: 38°50′19″N 99°37′07″E
- Country: China
- Province: Gansu
- Prefecture-level city: Zhangye
- County seat: Hongwansi

Area
  - Total: 20,176.7 km^{2} (7,790.3 sq mi)

Population (2020)
  - Total: 27,762
  - Density: 1.3759/km^{2} (3.5637/sq mi)
- Time zone: UTC+8 (China Standard)
- Postal code: 734400
- Website: www.gssn.gov.cn

Sunan Yugur Autonomous County

Chinese name
- Traditional Chinese: 肅南裕固族自治縣
- Simplified Chinese: 肃南裕固族自治县
Transcriptions
Standard Mandarin
- Hanyu Pinyin: Sùnán Yùgùzú Zìzhìxiàn
other Mandarin
- Xiao'erjing: سُ‌نًا یُوِقُ‌زُو زِجِ‌ثِیًا

Tibetan name
- Tibetan: སུའུ་ནན་ཡུས་ཀུའུ་རིགས་རང་སྐྱོང་རྫོང་།
Transcriptions
- Wylie: suʼu nan yus kuʼu rigs rang skyong rdzong
- Tibetan Pinyin: Sunain Yügurig Ranggyongzong

Mongolian name
- Mongolian Cyrillic: Сүнань ёгорын үндэстний өөртөө засах шянь
- Mongolian script: ᠰᠦᠨᠠᠨᠢ ᠶᠣᠭᠣᠷ ᠤᠨ ᠦᠨᠳᠦᠰᠦᠲᠡᠨ ᠦ ᠥᠪᠡᠷᠲᠡᠭᠡᠨ ᠵᠠᠰᠠᠬᠤ ᠰᠢᠶᠠᠨ
Transcriptions
- SASM/GNC: süneni yogor ündüsüten-ü öbertegen ǰasaꭓu siyan

Sunan Yugur Autonomous County (Chinese: 肃南裕固族自治县) is an autonomous county under the administration of the prefecture-level city of Zhangye, Gansu Province, China, bordering Qinghai province to the south. It is home to the majority of the Yugur ethnic group. The seat of government is in the town of Hongwansi (红湾寺镇).

The autonomous county spans an area of 20,176.7 square kilometres (7,790.3 mi^{2}), and is home to a total population of 39,283 as of 2021. The autonomous county is ethnically diverse, with large populations of Han Chinese, Yugurs, and Tibetans, with none comprising a majority.

Sunan Yugur Autonomous County consists of three separate areas: Mínghua District, situated in the plains in the northwest, and Huángcheng District, situated in the mountains in the southeast, are separated from the main part of the county.

== Toponymy ==
The autonomous county's name refers to its location to the south (Chinese: 南; pinyin: nán) of Suzhou (Chinese: 肃州; pinyin: Sùzhōu), the former name of Jiuquan.

== History ==
Sunan Yugur Autonomous County was established in 1954.

== Geography ==
Sunan Yugur Autonomous County is located in the middle portion of the Hexi Corridor, along the northern foot of Qilian Mountains. The autonomous county is particularly long and narrow, extending just 120 kilometres (75 mi) to 200 kilometres (120 mi) from north to south, but spans over 650 kilometres (400 mi) from east to west.

The autonomous county is bordered by Bairi Tibetan Autonomous County to the east and Subei Mongol Autonomous County to the west. The autonomous county's northern border is formed by Liangzhou District, Suzhou District, Jiayuguan, and Yumen from east to west. Sunan Yugur Autonomous County is bordered by Menyuan Hui Autonomous County of Qinghai to the south.

The physical geography of the region includes many mountains, canyons, and alluvial plains. The southern portion of the autonomous county is more mountainous, while the northern portion includes more plains. Elevation within Sunan Yugur Autonomous County ranges from 1,327 metres (4,354 ft) to 5,564 metres (18,255 ft) above sea level, with an average elevation of about 3,200 metres (10,500 ft) above sea level. Prominent mountains within the autonomous county include Suzhu Lian (Chinese: 素珠链; pinyin: Sùzhū Liàn) and the July 1 Glacier. Major rivers that flow through Sunan Yugur Autonomous County include the Ruo Shui, the Shiyang River, and the Shule River.

=== Climate ===
Sunan Yugur Autonomous County has an semi-arid alpine climate, with cold winters and cool summers. The average temperature in the autonomous county is 4.2 °C (39.6 °F), with cooler regions in the northwest averaging −3.0 °C (26.6 °F), and warmer regions in the southeast averaging 8.0 °C (46.4 °F). There is more precipitation in summer months than winter months. The average annual precipitation in the autonomous county is 267.1 millimetres (10.52 in), with drier regions in the northwest averaging about 100 millimetres (3.9 in), and wetter regions in the southeast averaging about 500 millimetres (20 in). The autonomous county has short frost-free periods, and a high amount of sunshine.

Climate data for Sunan, elevation 2,312 m (7,585 ft), (1991–2020 normals, extremes 1981–present)
Month	Jan	Feb	Mar	Apr	May	Jun	Jul	Aug	Sep	Oct	Nov	Dec	Year
Record high °C (°F)	14.7 (58.5)	20.3 (68.5)	21.4 (70.5)	28.3 (82.9)	28.5 (83.3)	30.2 (86.4)	33.4 (92.1)	30.9 (87.6)	30.0 (86.0)	25.6 (78.1)	20.1 (68.2)	16.5 (61.7)	33.4 (92.1)
Mean daily maximum °C (°F)	−0.9 (30.4)	2.1 (35.8)	7.0 (44.6)	13.3 (55.9)	17.9 (64.2)	21.6 (70.9)	23.5 (74.3)	22.5 (72.5)	18.2 (64.8)	12.2 (54.0)	5.8 (42.4)	0.8 (33.4)	12.0 (53.6)
Daily mean °C (°F)	−9.6 (14.7)	−6.4 (20.5)	−0.8 (30.6)	6.0 (42.8)	11.0 (51.8)	15.3 (59.5)	17.2 (63.0)	15.8 (60.4)	11.2 (52.2)	4.3 (39.7)	−2.4 (27.7)	−8.0 (17.6)	4.5 (40.0)
Mean daily minimum °C (°F)	−15.9 (3.4)	−12.7 (9.1)	−6.8 (19.8)	0.0 (32.0)	4.7 (40.5)	9.5 (49.1)	11.7 (53.1)	10.3 (50.5)	5.8 (42.4)	−1.3 (29.7)	−8.1 (17.4)	−14.2 (6.4)	−1.4 (29.4)
Record low °C (°F)	−25.8 (−14.4)	−23.5 (−10.3)	−21.1 (−6.0)	−14.9 (5.2)	−8.5 (16.7)	−0.2 (31.6)	4.1 (39.4)	2.1 (35.8)	−4.9 (23.2)	−13.8 (7.2)	−21.5 (−6.7)	−27.2 (−17.0)	−27.2 (−17.0)
Average precipitation mm (inches)	2.0 (0.08)	2.2 (0.09)	5.8 (0.23)	12.2 (0.48)	33.1 (1.30)	44.9 (1.77)	68.3 (2.69)	52.5 (2.07)	35.1 (1.38)	10.5 (0.41)	3.4 (0.13)	2.1 (0.08)	272.1 (10.71)
Average precipitation days (≥ 0.1 mm)	3.9	3.7	4.9	6.2	9.4	11.4	14.7	14.3	9.6	5.2	3.5	3.5	90.3
Average snowy days	5.4	5.7	7.2	6.1	2.3	0.1	0	0	0.2	3.9	4.8	5.1	40.8
Average relative humidity (%)	44	41	41	40	44	50	57	59	57	50	47	45	48
Mean monthly sunshine hours	227.0	217.4	242.4	250.6	260.4	240.3	234.7	228.0	220.6	248.7	233.9	223.9	2,827.9
Percentage possible sunshine	74	71	65	63	59	54	52	55	60	73	79	77	65
Source: China Meteorological Administrationall-time extreme also tied in July 1997All-time Oct extreme

== Administrative divisions ==
Sunan Yugur Autonomous County is divided into 3 towns, 2 townships, 3 ethnic townships and 2 other township-level divisions. These township-level divisions then, in turn, administer 102 village-level divisions. The town of Hongwansi serves as the seat of government.

Name	Simplified Chinese	Hanyu Pinyin	Administrative division code	Notes
Towns
Hongwansi	红湾寺镇	Hóngwānsì Zhèn	620721100	
Huangcheng	皇城镇	Huángchéng Zhèn	620721101	
Kangle	康乐镇	Kānglè Zhèn	620721102	
Townships
Dahe Township	大河乡	Dàhé Xiāng	620721203	
Minghua Township	明花乡	Mínghuā Xiāng	620721204	
Ethnic townships
Mati Tibetan Ethnic Township	马蹄藏族乡	Mǎtí Zàngzú Xiāng	620721200	(Tibetan) མཱ་ཐིས་བོད་རིགས་ཞང་། mā this bod rigs zhang Mati Poirig Xang
Qifeng Tibetan Ethnic Township	祁丰藏族乡	Qífēng Zàngzú Xiāng	620721205	(Tibetan) ཆུའུ་ཧྥིན་བོད་རིགས་ཞང་། chuʼu hphin bod rigs zhang Qufin Poirig Xang
Baiyin Mongol Ethnic Township	白银蒙古族乡	Báiyín Ménggǔzú Xiāng	620721202	(Mongolian) ᠪᠠᠶᠠᠨ ᠮᠣᠩᠭᠣᠯ ᠦᠨᠳᠦᠰᠦᠲᠡᠨ ᠦ ᠰᠤᠮᠤ bayan moŋɣol ündüsüten-ü sumu
Township-level divisions
Gansu Provincial Sheep Breeding Farm	甘肃省绵羊育种场	Gānsù Miányáng Yùzhǒngchǎng	620721500	
Zhangye Baopinghe Ranch	张掖宝瓶河牧场	Zhāngyè Bǎopínghé Mùchǎng	620721501	

== Demographics ==
As of 2021, Sunan Yugur Autonomous County has a population of 39,283, an increase of 25 people from 2020. This figure is up from 35,869 in 1999, and 35,500 in 1993. The autonomous county recorded 14,932 households that year, down 56 from 2020, giving it an average household size of 2.63 people.

=== Ethnic groups ===
Sunan Yugur Autonomous County is an ethnically diverse area. No single ethnic group comprises a majority of its population as of 2021. The largest ethnic groups in the autonomous county are the Han Chinese, Yugurs, and Tibetans. Other groups with sizable populations within the autonomous county include the Hui, the Monguor, and the Mongols. A large amount of ethnic Tibetans lived in the now-defunct Xishui Tibetan Ethnic Township.

Ethnic composition
	1993		2021	
Ethnic group	Population	Percentage	Population	Percentage
Han Chinese	16,976	47.82%	16,693	42.49%
Yugur	8,825	24.86%	10,684	27.20%
Tibetan	8,393	23.64%	10,323	26.28%
Hui	614	1.73%	N/A	N/A
Monguor	356	1.00%	N/A	N/A
Mongol	316	0.89%	N/A	N/A
Others	20	0.06%	1,583	4.03%

==== Historic ethnic composition ====
Ethnic composition by administrative division (1993)
Towns and Townships	Total	Yugur	Han	Tibetan	Hui	Monguor	Mongol
Total	35500	8825	16976	8393	614	356	316
Hongwansì Town	5637	1193	3568	754	48	38	24
Huangcheng Town	7408	1486	3530	2037	193	145	12
Beitan Township	1504	456	818	168	49	2	11
Dongtan Township	2052	578	1333	36	100	4	0
Huajian Township	1509	29	928	477	33	38	0
Mayíng Township	650	419	215	16	0	0	0
Yangxiang Township	1693	4	236	1340	11	101	1
Mati Town	5265	43	2801	2343	28	35	15
Daquangou Township	1974	8	1442	524	0	0	0
Dadouma Township	2034	21	1142	815	8	35	13
Xishui Township	1257	14	217	1004	20	0	2
Kangle Town	4466	1831	2057	196	170	63	257
Baiyin Township	831	28	556	29	9	0	218
Hongshiwo Township	1655	1156	404	45	4	8	38
Qinglong Township	1456	267	889	98	146	55	0
Yangge Township	524	380	108	24	11	0	1
Dahe Town	5802	2131	3174	260	162	72	4
Jiucaigou Township	1729	1103	561	28	32	1	4
Lamawan Township	1149	74	1038	0	29	8	0
Shuiguan Township	618	336	170	111	1	0	0
Xuequan Township	2306	618	1404	121	100	63	0
Minghua Town	2418	2088	307	19	0	1	2
Minghai Township	1052	1002	47	1	0	0	1
Lianhua Township	890	779	93	17	0	0	1
Qiantan Township	476	307	167	1	0	1	0
Qifeng District	3408	50	558	2787	8	2	2
Qílian Township	1088	3	77	1007	0	1	0
Qílin Township	654	7	67	580	0	0	0
Qíwen Township	1181	40	374	760	4	1	2
Qiqing Township	485	0	40	440	4	0	0
Nomads	1096	3	1082	6	5	0	0

== Economy ==
Sunan Yugur Autonomous County had a total gross domestic product (GDP) of 3.306 billion renminbi (RMB) as of 2021, an increase of 5.8% from 2020. Of this, the primary sector constituted 829 million RMB (25.08% of total GDP), an increase of 7.2% from 2020; the secondary sector totaled 1.244 billion RMB (37.63% of total GDP), an increase of 5.2% from 2020; the tertiary sector totaled 1.232 billion RMB (37.27% of total GDP), an increase of 5.3% from 2020. Total retail sales totaled 617 million RMB in 2021, a 12.3% increase from 2020. In 2021, the per capita disposable income of the autonomous county's urban residents totaled 33,531 RMB, a 7.5% increase from 2020; the disposable income of rural residents totaled 21,783 RMB, a 10.0% increase from 2020.

Tourism accounts for a significant portion of Sunan Yugur Autonomous County's economy. In 2021, the autonomous county received a total of 3.15 million tourists, a 23.7% increase from 2020. Total revenue from tourism totaled 1.572 billion RMB, a 29.2% increase from 2020.

Sunan Yugur Autonomous county is home to a sizable mining industry, and rich in deposits of coal, copper, iron, tungsten, chromium, manganese, and other mineral resources.

== See also ==
- Hexi Corridor
- Yugurs
