= Ka with ascender =

Cyrillic letter

- K k

Usage
- Writing system: Cyrillic
- Type: Alphabetic
- Language of origin: Kabardian language

History

Ka with ascender is a letter of the Cyrillic script which was used in Kabardian at the start of the 20th century.

== Usage ==
In turkology, Vasily Radlov used ka with ascender ⟨k⟩ in the mixed alphabet (a mix of Latin and Cyrillic) in his dictionary of Turkic language dialects in 4 volumes published between 1893 and 1911.

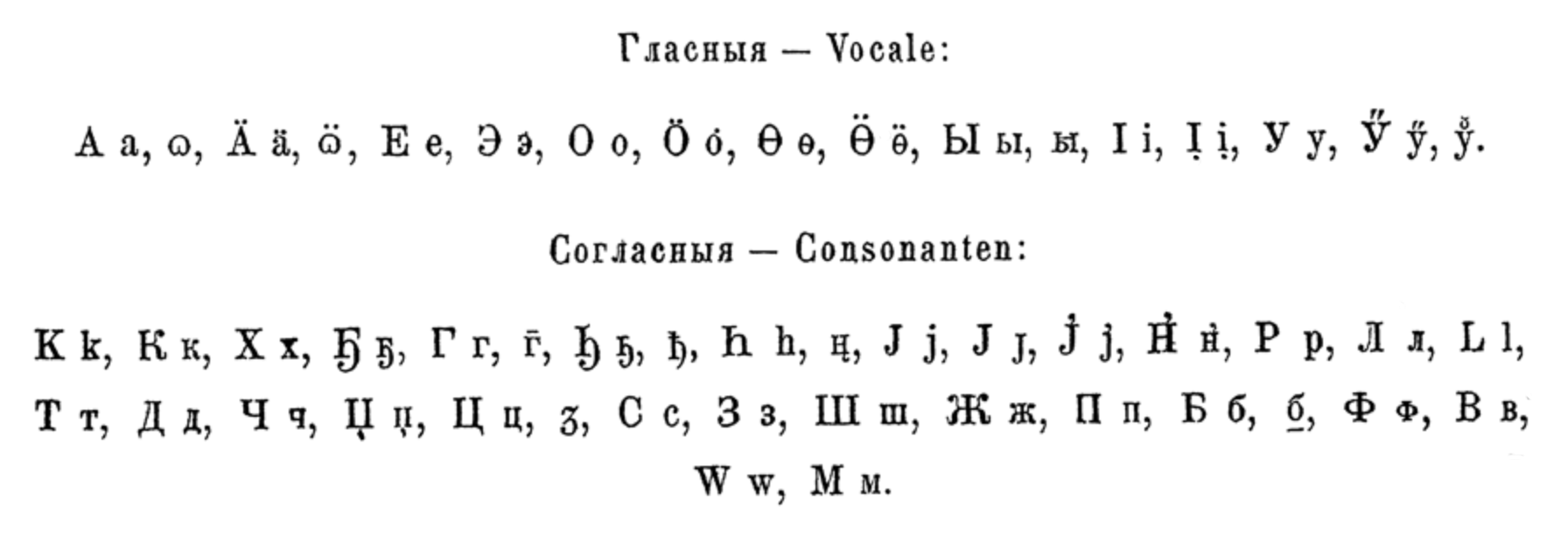
Alphabet in Radlov 1893.

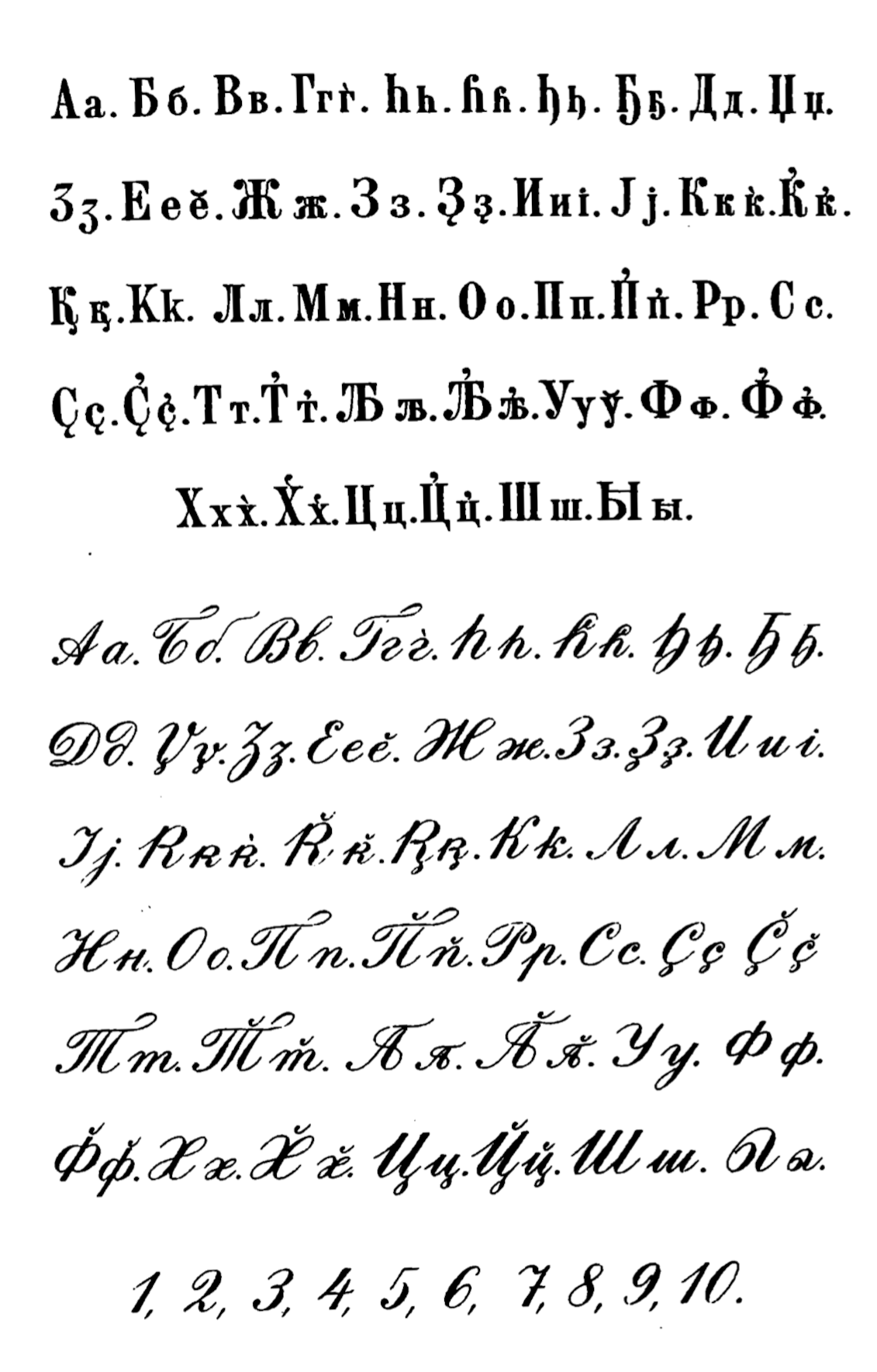
Kabardian alphabet of the abecedary of Tambiev 1906.

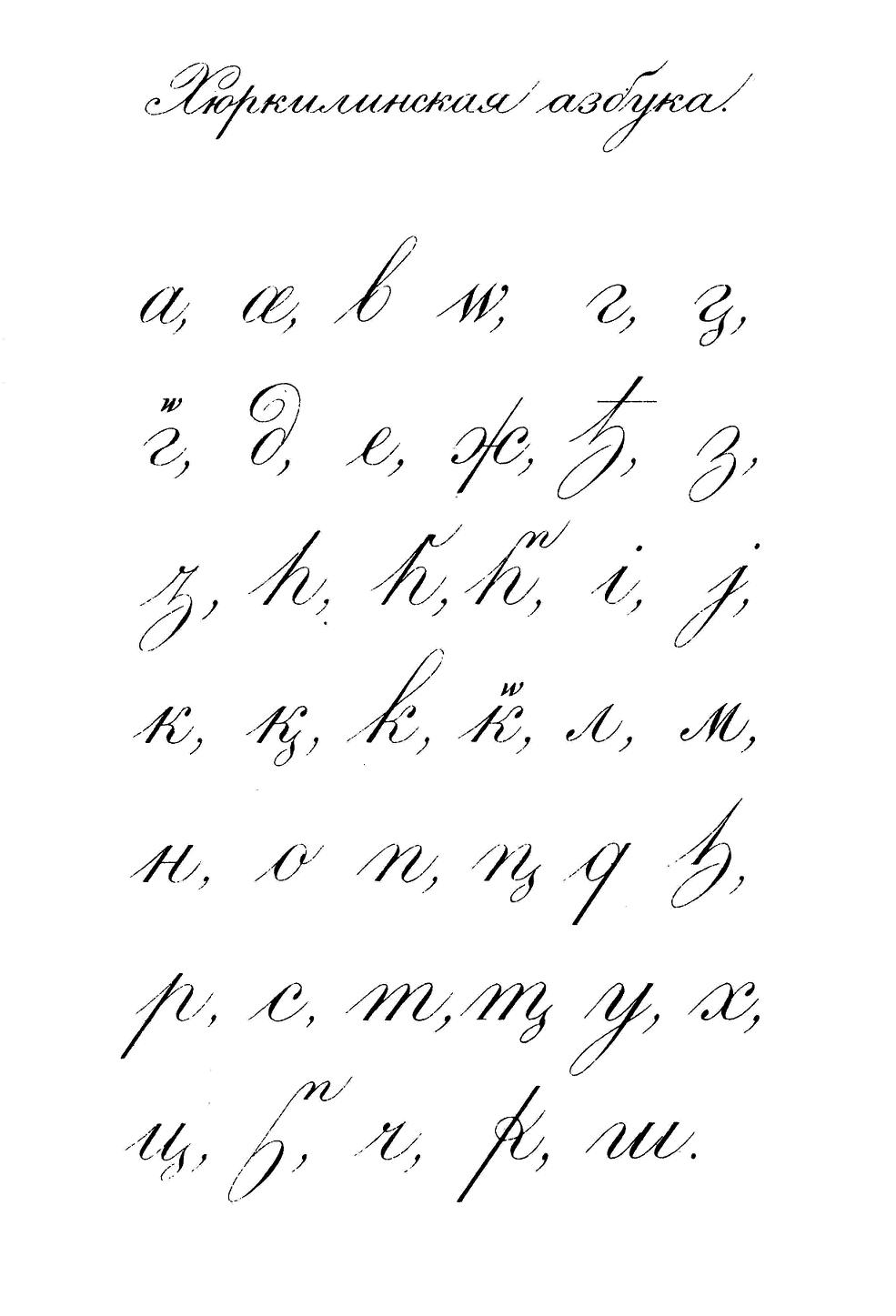
1892 Dargwa alphabet

== Computing codes ==
This letter does not have any computing codes, most notably in Unicode. It is possible to approximate this letter with the Latin letter K in the fonts where it looks different from the Cyrillic letter Ka and k.

== See also ==
- Қ (ka with descender)
- Ќ (kje)
- Kabardian language
- Cyrillic script

== Sources ==
- Radloff, W. (1893–1911). Опыт словаря тюркских наречий (in Russian and German). Vol. 1–4. Saint-Petersbourg: Императорской Академии Наук.
- Тамбиев, Паго Измаилович (1906). Кабардинская азбука (in Russian). Тифлис: Типография Канцелярии Наместника Его Императорского Величества на Кавказе. Tambiev1906.
