= Eastern Yugur language =

Mongolic language of Gansu, China

Eastern Yugur
- Native to: China
- Region: Gansu
- Ethnicity: 6,000 Yugur (2000)
- Native speakers: 4,000 (2007)
- Language family: Mongolic: Southern Mongolic; Eastern Yugur

Language codes
- ISO 639-3: yuy
- Glottolog: east2337
- ELP: East Yugur
- Eastern Yugur is classified as Severely Endangered by the UNESCO Atlas of the World's Languages in Danger.

Eastern Yugur is a Mongolic language spoken by the Yugurs, who also speak Western Yughur—a Turkic language. The terms may also indicate the speakers of these languages, which are both unwritten. Traditionally, both languages are indicated by the term Yellow Uygur, from the autonym of the Yugur. Eastern Yugur speakers are said to have passive bilingualism with Inner Mongolian, the standard spoken in China.

Eastern Yugur is a threatened language with an aging population of fluent speakers. Language contact with neighbouring languages, particularly Chinese, has noticeably affected the language competency of younger speakers. Some younger speakers have also begun to lose their ability to distinguish between different phonetic shades within the language, indicating declining language competency.

Grigory Potanin recorded a glossary of Salar, Western Yugur, and Eastern Yugur in his 1893 book written in Russian, The Tangut-Tibetan Borderlands of China and Central Mongolia.

== Phonology ==
Consonants
		Bilabial	Alveolar		Palatal	Velar	Uvular	Glottal
		Bilabial	plain	lateral	Palatal	Velar	Uvular	Glottal
Stop	voiceless	p	t			k	q	
Stop	aspirated	pʰ	tʰ			kʰ	qʰ	
Affricate	voiceless		t͡s		t͡ʃ			
Affricate	aspirated		t͡sʰ		t͡ʃʰ			
Fricative	voiceless		s	ɬ	ʃ		χ	h
Fricative	voiced	β				ɣ	ʁ	
Nasal	voiced	m	n			ŋ		
Nasal	voiceless		n̥					
Trill			r					
Approximant				l	j			

The phonemes /f, ʈʂ, ʈʂʰ, ʂ, ʐ, tɕ, tɕʰ, ɕ/ appear exclusively in Chinese loanwords.

Vowels
	Front		Central	Back
High	i	y	ʉ	u
Mid	e	ø	ə	o ɔ
Low				ɑ

Vowel length is also distributed.
