= Yugurs =

Turko-Mongolic ethnic group living in China

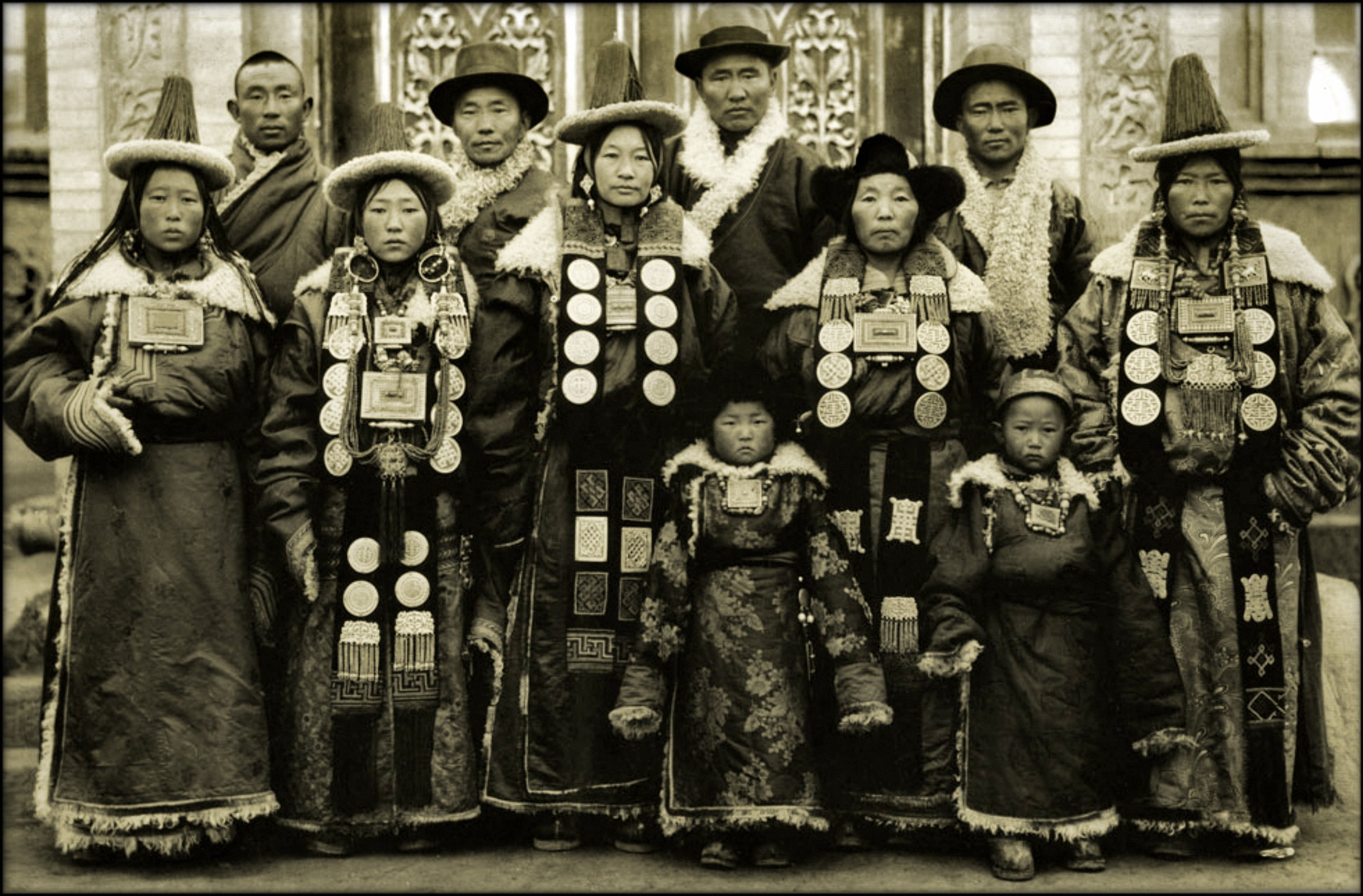
- A Yugur family in Lanzhou, Gansu, 1944

Total population
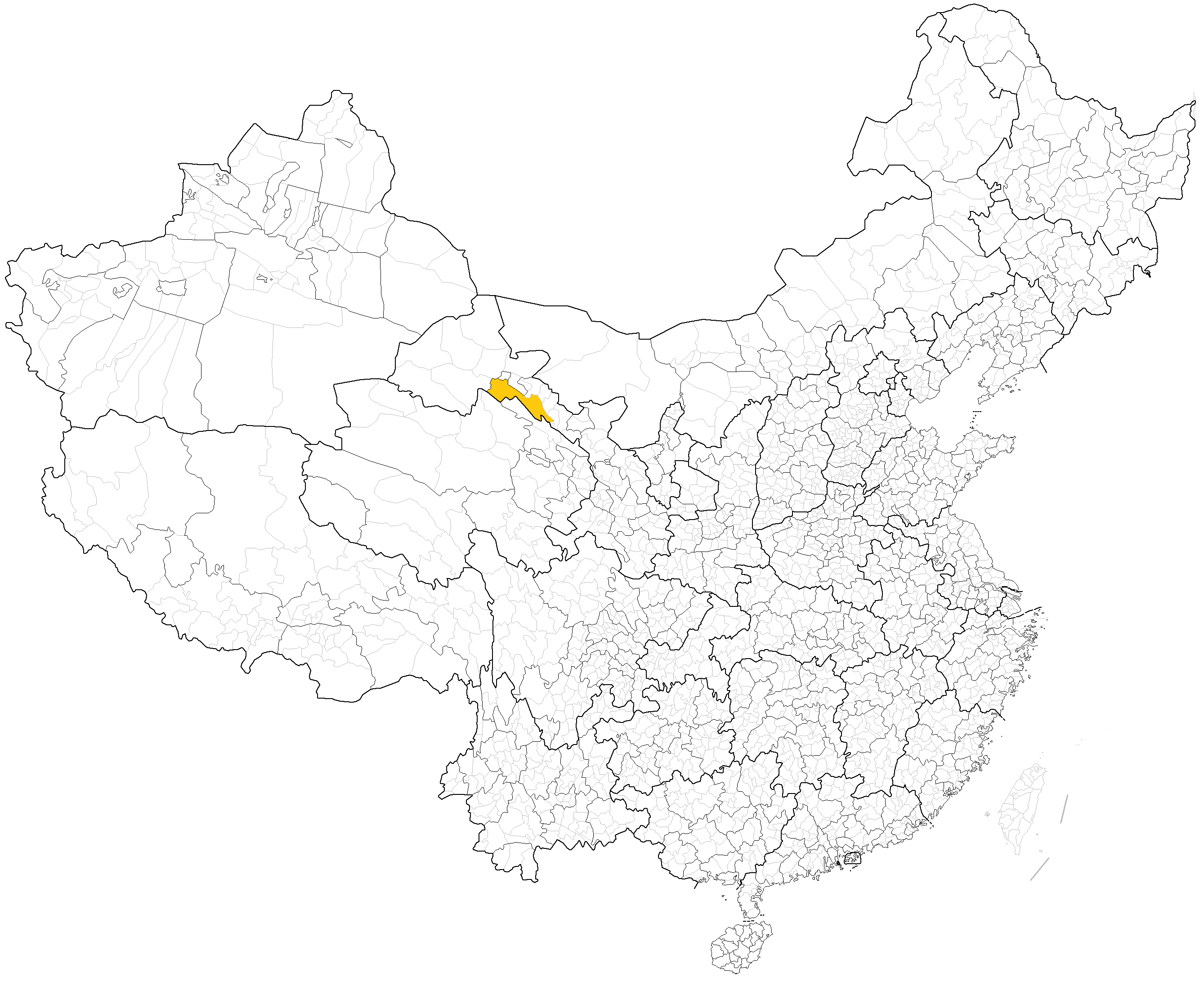
- 14,706 (2020 census) Distribution of Yugur autonomous prefectures and counties in mainland China

Regions with significant populations
- Sunan Yugur Autonomous County, Gansu, China

Languages
- Neo-Uyghur (Western Yugur), Eastern Yugur

Religion
- Tibetan Buddhism; Tengrism (Shamanism)

Related ethnic groups
- Old Uyghurs; Salars; other Turkic and Mongolic peoples

The Yugurs, Yughurs, Yugu (Chinese: 裕固族; pinyin: Yùgùzú; Western Yugur: Sarığ yoğır; Eastern Yugur: Shera yogor), traditionally known as Yellow Uyghurs or Yellow Uygurs, are a Turko-Mongol ethnic group and one of China's 56 officially recognized ethnic groups, consisting of 14,706 persons, according to the 2020 census. The Yugur live primarily in Sunan Yugur Autonomous County in Gansu. They are mostly Tibetan Buddhists. The majority of Yugurs speak a Turkic language, while Mongolic and Chinese are also used in eastern provinces.

== History ==
The Turkic-speaking Yugurs are considered to be the descendants of a group of Old Uyghurs who fled from Mongolia southwards to Gansu after the collapse of the Uyghur Khaganate in 840, where they established the prosperous Ganzhou Uyghur Kingdom (870–1036) with capital near present Zhangye at the base of the Qilian Mountains in the valley of the Ejin River.

In 1037, the Yugurs came under Tangut rule. As a result of Khizr Khoja's invasion of Qumul, many residents who rejected conversion to Islam escaped to nearby Dunhuang and Hunan in China proper. These were the ancestors of the Yugurs, who have remained Vajrayana Buddhists to the present day.

The Yugurs adopted the Gelug order of Tibetan Buddhism in the late 16th century, under the influence of Sonam Gyatso, the third Dalai Lama.

In 1893, Russian explorer Grigory Potanin, the first Western scientist to study the Yugurs, published a small glossary of Yugur words, along with notes on their administration and geographical situation.

== Language ==
About 4,600 Yugurs speak Western Yugur, a Siberian Turkic language, and about 2,800 Eastern Yugur, a Mongolic language. Western Yugur has preserved many archaisms of Old Uyghur. Both Yugur languages are now unwritten, although the Old Uyghur alphabet was in use in some Yugur communities until the end of 17th century.
