= Josi =

Josi is a surname. Notable people with the surname include:

- Christiaan Josi (1768–1828), Dutch engraver and art dealer
- Erwin Josi (born 1955), Swiss alpine skier
- Roman Josi (born 1990), Swiss ice hockey player

== See also ==
- Josh
- Josi (given name)
