= Potaninia mongolica =

Scientific classification
- Kingdom: Plantae
- Clade: Tracheophytes
- Clade: Angiosperms
- Clade: Eudicots
- Clade: Rosids
- Order: Rosales
- Family: Rosaceae
- Genus: Potaninia; Maxim. (1882)
- Species: P. mongolica

Binomial name
- Potaninia mongolica Maxim. (1882)

Species of flowering plant

Potaninia is a monotypic genus of flowering plants belonging to the family Rosaceae. It only contains one known species, Potaninia mongolica Maxim.

It is native to Mongolia and Inner Mongolia (in China).

The genus name of Potaninia is in honour of Grigory Potanin (1835–1920), a Russian ethnographer and natural historian. The Latin specific epithet of mongolica means "coming from of Mongolia", where the plant was found. Both the genus and the species were first described and published in Bull. Acad. Imp. Sci. Saint-Pétersbourg, séries 3, Vol.27 on page 465 in 1882.
