= Old Uyghur =

Extinct Siberian Turkic language of Central and East Asia

- Native to: Uyghur Khaganate, Qocho, Ganzhou Uyghur Kingdom
- Region: Mongolia, Hami, Turpan, Gansu
- Era: 9th–14th century developed into Neo-Uygur (Yugur)
- Language family: Turkic: Common Turkic; Siberian Turkic; Old Turkic; Old Uyghur
- Writing system: Old Turkic script, Old Uyghur alphabet, Manichaean script, Sogdian alphabet, Syriac alphabet, Brahmi script

Language codes
- ISO 639-3: oui
- Glottolog: oldu1239

Old Uyghur (simplified Chinese: 回鹘语; traditional Chinese: 回鶻語; pinyin: Huíhú yǔ) was a Turkic language spoken in Qocho from the 9th–14th centuries as well as in Gansu.

== History ==
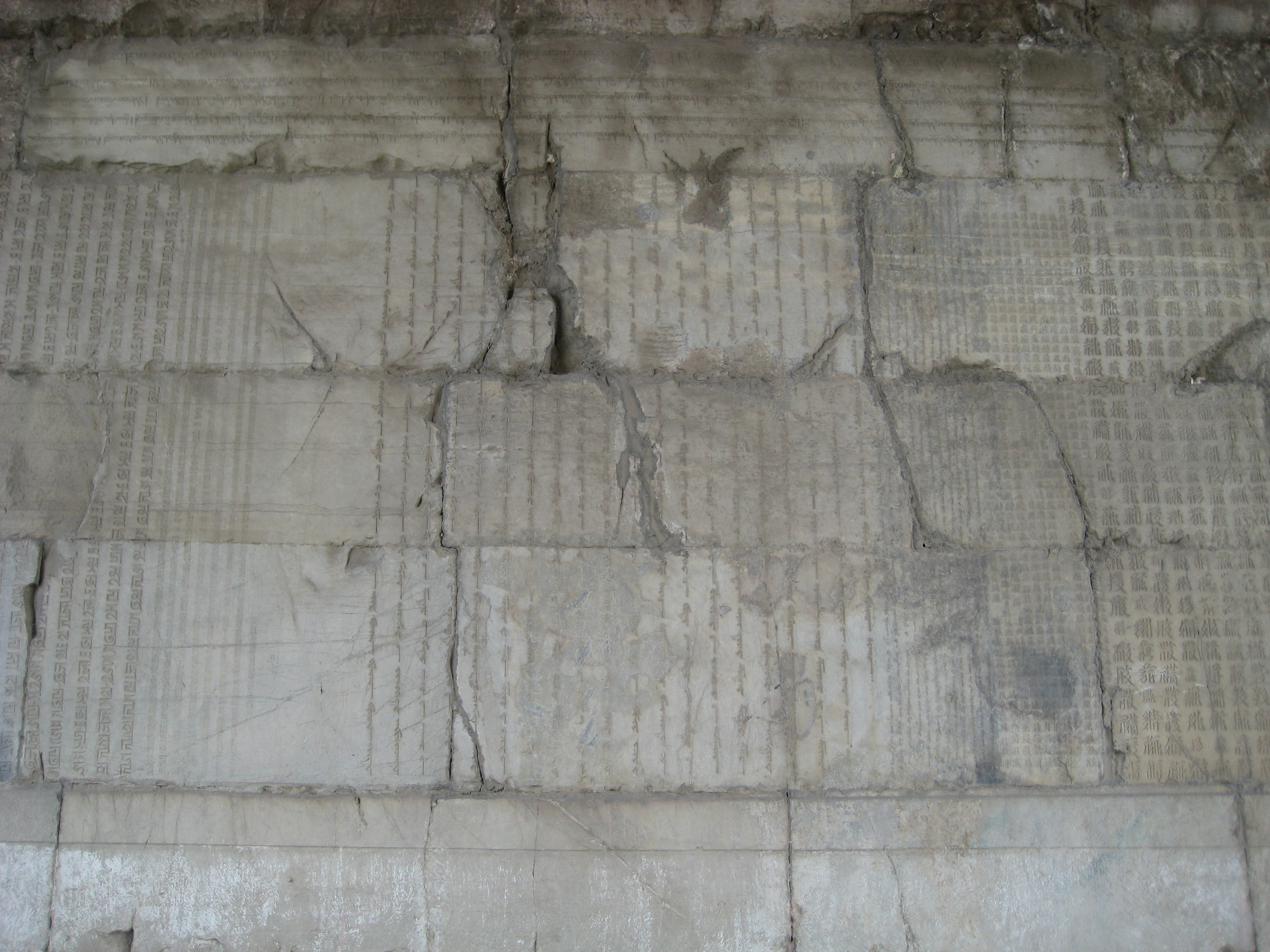
Uyghur inscription on the east interior wall of the Cloud Platform at Juyong Pass.

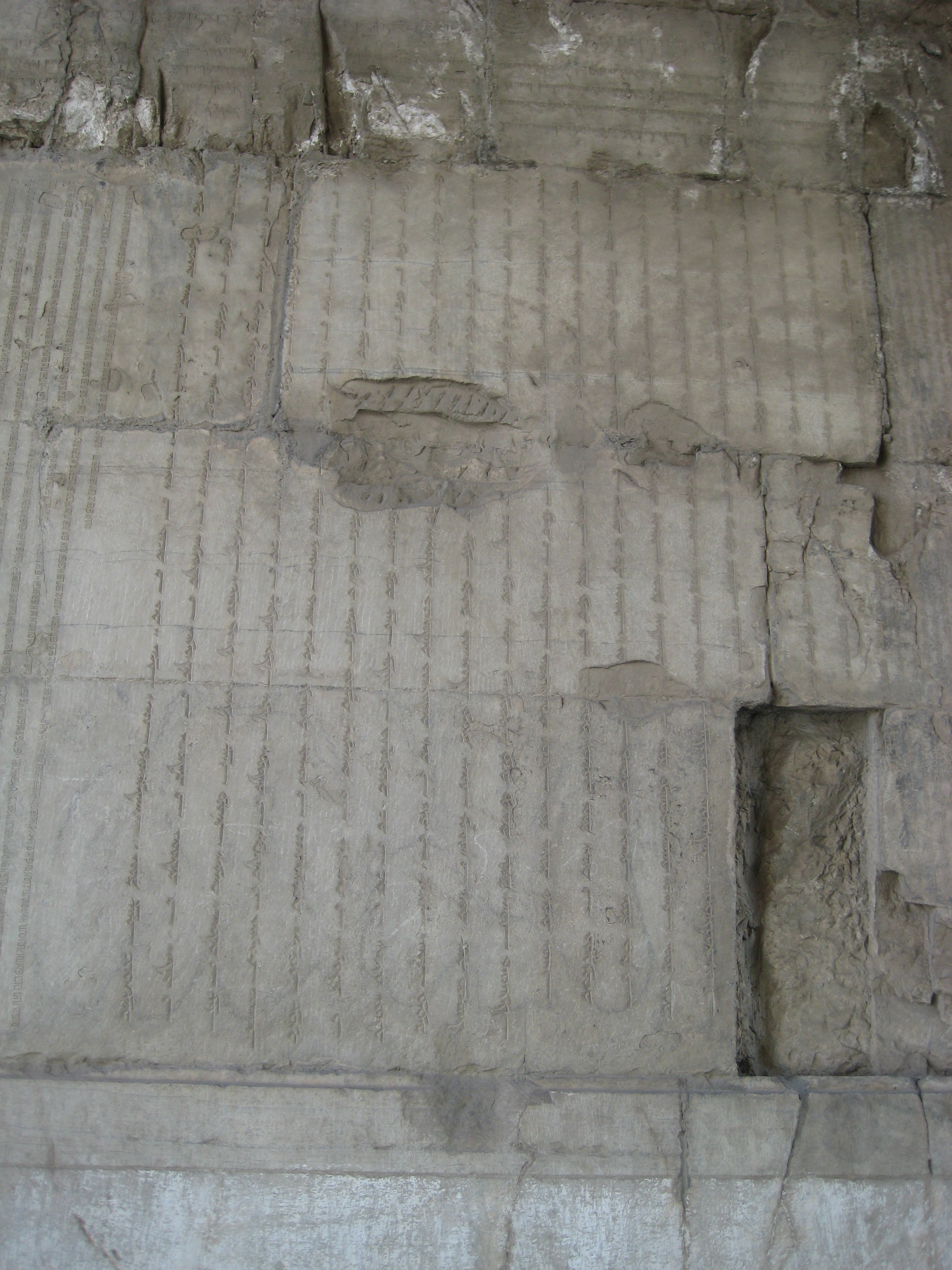
Uyghur inscription on the west interior wall of the Cloud Platform at Juyong Pass.

Old Uyghur evolved from Old Turkic, a Siberian Turkic language, after the Uyghur Khaganate broke up and remnants of it migrated to Turfan, Qomul (later Hami), and Gansu in the ninth century.

The Uyghurs in Turfan and Qomul founded Qocho and adopted Manichaeism and Buddhism as their religions, while those in Gansu first founded the Ganzhou Uyghur Kingdom and became subjects of the Western Xia; their descendants are the Yugurs of Gansu. The Western Yugur language is the descendant of Old Uyghur.

The Kingdom of Qocho survived as a client state of the Mongol Empire but was conquered by the Muslim Chagatai Khanate, which conquered Turfan and Qomul and Islamized the region. Old Uyghur then became extinct in Turfan and Qomul.

The Uyghur language that is the official language of the Xinjiang Uyghur Autonomous Region is not descended from Old Uyghur. It is a descendant of the Karluk languages spoken in the Kara-Khanid Khanate, in particular the Khākānī language described by Mahmud al-Kashgari. The only surviving descendant of Old Uyghur is Yellow Yughur, spoken in the Gansu region of China.

== Features ==
Old Uyghur had an anticipating counting system, which is passed on to Western Yugur.

== Literature ==
Much of Old Uyghur literature is religious texts regarding Manichaeism and Buddhism, with examples found among the Dunhuang manuscripts. Multilingual inscriptions including Old Uyghur can be found at the Cloud Platform at Juyong Pass and the Stele of Sulaiman.

== Script ==
Qocho, the Uyghur kingdom created in 843, originally used the "runic" Old Turkic script with a "anïγ" dialect. The Old Turkic script was adopted from local inhabitants, along with a "ayïγ" dialect, when they migrated into Turfan after 840.
