= Salar language =

Turkic language of the Oghuz sub-branch

Salar
- Salarcha 撒拉语
- Pronunciation: [sa̠lá̠ɻt͡ɕʰa̠] [sa̠lɯ̞́˞t͡ɕʰa̠]
- Native to: China
- Region: Qinghai, Gansu, Xinjiang
- Ethnicity: Salar
- Native speakers: 70,000 (2002)
- Language family: Turkic: Common Turkic; Oghuz; Salar
- Dialects: Ili Salar; Gaizi (Jiezi); Mengda
- Writing system: Pinyin-based Latin and Chinese characters

Official status
- Official language in: China: Xunhua Salar Autonomous County; Jishishan Bonan, Dongxiang and Salar Autonomous County

Language codes
- ISO 639-3: slr
- Glottolog: sala1264
- ELP: Salar
- Salar is classified as Vulnerable by the UNESCO Atlas of the World's Languages in Danger.

Salar is a Turkic language spoken by the Salar people, who mainly live in the provinces of Qinghai and Gansu in China; some also live in Ili, Xinjiang. It is a primary branch and an eastern outlier of the Oghuz branch of Turkic, the other Oghuz languages being spoken mostly in West and Central Asia. The Salar number about 105,000 people, about 70,000 (2002) speak the Salar language; under 20,000 are monolinguals.

According to Salar tradition and Chinese chronicles, the Salars are the descendants of the Salur tribe, belonging to the Oghuz Turk tribe of the Western Turkic Khaganate. During the Tang dynasty, the Salur tribe dwelt within China's borders and since then has lived within the Qinghai–Gansu border region. Contemporary Salar has some influence from Mandarin Chinese and Amdo Tibetan.

== Classification ==
Due to the ethnonym "Salur", which is also shared by some modern Turkmen tribes, linguists historically tried to establish a link between Turkmen varieties and the Salar language. Some placenames in Uzbekistan include the word Salar. Most modern linguists today classify Salar as an independent primary branch of the Oghuz languages.

== Dialects ==
The Qing dynasty deported some Salars that belonged to the Jahriyya Sufi order to the Ili valley in modern-day Xinjiang. Today a community of about 4,000 Salars speaking a distinct dialect of Salar still live in Ili. Salar migrants from Amdo, Qinghai, came to settle in the region as religious exiles, migrants, and as soldiers enlisted in the Chinese army to fight rebels in Ili, often following the Hui. The distinctive dialect of the Ili Salar differs from the other Salar dialects because the neighboring Kazakh and Uyghur languages in Ili influenced it. The Ili Salar population numbers around 4,000 people. There have been instances of misunderstanding between speakers of Ili Salar and Qinghai Salar due to the divergence of the dialects. The differences between the two dialect result in a "clear isogloss".

However, Lin Lianyun and Han Jianye divide Salar into two dialects by including Western Salar in the Gaizi dialect: the Gaizi dialect and the Mengda dialect. The Gaizi dialect is mainly distributed in Jiezi, Qingshui and Baizhuang in Xunhua County, Gandu in Hualong County, Dahejia in Linxia Hui Autonomous Prefecture of Gansu Province and Yining County, Xinjiang Uygur Autonomous Region. The Mengda dialect is distributed around the Mengda area of Xunhua County. The Mengda dialect is b-Salar, while the Gaizi (or Jiezi) dialect is v-Salar. For example; It lives in the Ili and Jiezi as vol- 'to be', ver- 'to give', vax- 'to look', and in the Mengda dialect as bol- 'to be', ber- 'to give', bax- 'to look'. Also, Mengda lost its ⟨gh⟩ phoneme, which has developed into the ⟨x⟩ phoneme: Gaizi değ- 'to touch', Mengda dex- 'to touch'; Gaizi yağ- 'to rain', Mengda yax- 'to rain'. While the ⟨m⟩ phoneme stood in the Gaizi dialect, it turned into the ⟨n⟩ sound in the Mengda dialect: Gaizi qamcü 'whip', Mengda qancü 'whip'; Gaizi göm- "to embed", Mengda gön- 'to embed'.

Tenishev's comparison of Jiezi and Mengda (IPA)
Jiezi (Gaizi)	/tʰ/	/v/	/e/	/i/	/ɘ/	/ɨ/	/ø/
Mengda	/ʒʰ/	/p/	/ɑ/	/e/	/ɑ/	/i/	/o/

Although Ili Salar is located far away from other dialects, the dialects of the Salar language are very close to each other. The difference between them is mostly phonological. For example; Ili Salar gölök, Qinghai gölix, gölex "cow".

== History ==
=== Origins and development ===
The ancestor to modern Salar is thought to have diverged first from the Proto-Oghuz language, a hypothetical language that all modern Oghuz languages are believed to be descended from. It was brought to the region by a small, nomadic, Muslim community, and received significant influence from other non-Oghuz Turkic languages such as Chagatai, Kipchak and the Karluk languages, along with non-Turkic languages belonging to the Sino-Tibetan family.

After the Jahriyya revolt, some Salars were deported to the Ili valley and established a new community in the region. This led to the divergence of a distinctive dialect called Ili Salar influenced by the neighboring Kazakh, Kyrgyz, and Uyghur languages.

=== Current situation ===
According to 2002 estimates, Salars number about 105,000, and about 70,000 of them speak Salar. Less than 20,000 Salars are monolingual.

The Salar language is the official language in all Salar autonomous areas. Such autonomous areas are the Xunhua Salar Autonomous County and the Jishishan Bonan, Dongxiang and Salar Autonomous County. In Qinghai Province, most Salar people speak both Qinghai Mandarin and Salar. Rural Salars can speak Salar more fluently while urban Salars often assimilate more into the Chinese-speaking Hui Muslim population.

== Phonology ==
Salar's phonology has been influenced by Chinese and Tibetan. In addition, /k, q/ and /ɡ, ɢ/ have become separate phonemes due to loanwords, as they have in other Turkic languages.

Consonants
		Labial	Dental	Retroflex	Alveolo- palatal	Velar	Uvular	Glottal
Nasal		m	n					
Plosive/ Affricate	voiceless	p	t	t͡ʂ	t͡ɕ	k	q	
Plosive/ Affricate	voiced	b	d	d͡ʐ	d͡ʑ	ɡ	ɢ	
Fricative	voiceless	f	s	ʂ	ɕ	x		h
Fricative	voiced	(v)	z				ʁ	
Approximant		w	l		j			
Rhotic			r					

Vowels
	Front		Back	
	unrounded	rounded	unrounded	rounded
Close	i	y	ɯ	u
Open	e	ø	ɑ	o

Salar's vowels are similar to those of Turkish, with the back vowels /a, ɯ, o, u/ and the corresponding front vowels /e, i, ø, y/. In Ili Salar, the high front vowels i and y, when placed after an initial glide, are spirantized with j transforming into ʝ. Qinghai and Ili Salar have mostly the same consonantal development.

== Vocabulary ==
In Qinghai Province, the Salar language has been notably influenced by Chinese and Tibetan. Although of Turkic origin, major linguistic structures have been absorbed from Chinese. Around 20% of the vocabulary is of Chinese origin and another 10% is of Tibetan origin. Yet the official Chinese government policy deliberately covers up these influences in academic and linguistics studies, trying to emphasize the Turkic element and completely ignoring the Chinese superstrate in the Salar language. The Salar language has taken loans and influence from neighboring varieties of Chinese. Vice versa, the neighboring variants of the Chinese language have also adopted loanwords from the Salar language.

The verb 'to do' is ät in Salar (cf. Turkish et). The word 'lips' is dodax in Salar (cf. Turkish dudak). The participle -miş is used by Salar (cf. Turkish -mış).

== Writing system ==
Salars mostly use Chinese for writing while using the Salar language for speaking.

Salar does not have an official script, but it has sometimes been written down using the Arabic script. Some Salar call for a Latin script and some Salar who dislike the Pinyin-based Latin script desire to use Chinese characters instead. This lack of an official script has led most Salar to use the Chinese writing system. China offered the Salar an official writing system quite similar to the Uyghur New Script, but it was rejected for similar reasons as Yengi Yezik was rejected in Xinjiang.

Young Salar have also started to use a Salar script based on the orthography for Turkic languages. It is quite popular with Salars for writing Salar on the internet. There are two main variants that are used, TB30 and TB31. The Arabic script is also still popular among the Salar. The Arabic script has a historical precedent among the Salar; centuries-old documents in the Salar language written in the Arabic script have been discovered.

Grigory Potanin used the Cyrillic alphabet to record a glossary of Salar, Western Yugur language and Eastern Yugur language in his 1893 Russian language book The Tangut-Tibetan Borderlands of China and Central Mongolia with assistance from Vasily Radlov.

William Woodville Rockhill wrote a glossary of Salar in his 1894 book Diary of a Journey through Mongolia and Tibet in 1891 and 1892 using the Latin alphabet based on the Wade–Giles romanization system used for Chinese.

=== Pinyin-based Latin alphabet ===
A romanization of the Mengda dialect of Salar based on Pinyin has been developed, created by a Salar, Ma Quanlin, who lives in Xunhua. Like Pinyin, which is used to romanize Mandarin Chinese, this Salar romanization is divided into categories of consonants and vowels. Letters that occur both in Pinyin and romanization of Mengda Salar share the same sound values.

==== Consonants ====
Pinyin	IPA	English approximation	Explanation
b	[p]	spit	unaspirated p, as in spit
p	[pʰ]	pay	strongly aspirated p, as in pit
m	[m]	may	as in English mummy
f	[f]	fair	as in English fun
d	[t]	stop	unaspirated t, as in stop
t	[tʰ]	take	strongly aspirated t, as in top
n	[n]	nay	as in English nit
l	[l]	lay	as in English love
l	[ð]	those	as in English the
g	[k]	skill	unaspirated k, as in skill
g̲	[ɣ]	no equivalent in English	"thicker and deeper" version of g
k	[kʰ]	kay	strongly aspirated k, as in kill
h	[x]	loch	roughly like the Scots ch. English h as in hay or hot is an acceptable approximation.
j	[tɕ]	hatch	No equivalent in English. Like q, but unaspirated. Not the s in Asia, despite the common English pronunciation of "Beijing".
q	[tɕʰ]	cheek	No equivalent in English. Like cheek, with the lips spread wide with ee. Curl the tip of the tongue downwards to stick it at the back of the teeth and strongly aspirate.
x	[ɕ]	she	No equivalent in English. Like she, with the lips spread and the tip of your tongue curled downwards and stuck to the back of teeth when you say ee.
zh	[tʂ]	junk	Rather like ch (a sound between choke, joke, true, and drew, tongue tip curled more upwards). Voiced in a toneless syllable.
ch	[tʂʰ]	church	as in chin, but with the tongue curled upwards; very similar to nurture in American English, but strongly aspirated.
sh	[ʂ]	shirt	as in shoe, but with the tongue curled upwards; very similar to marsh in American English
r	[ʐ], [ɻ]	ray	Similar to the English z in azure and r in reduce, but with the tongue curled upwards, like a cross between English "r" and French "j". In Cyrillised Chinese the sound is rendered with the letter "ж".
z	[ts]	reads	unaspirated c, similar to something between suds and cats; as in suds in a toneless syllable
c	[tsʰ]	hats	like the English ts in cats, but strongly aspirated, very similar to the Czech and Polish c.
s	[s]	say	as in sun
y	[j], [ɥ]	yea	as in yes. Before a u, pronounce it with rounded lips.*
w	[w]	way	as in water.*
v	[v]	vitamin	as in very.

==== Vowels ====
Pinyin	IPA	Form with zero initial	Explanation
a	[ɑ]	a	as in "father"
o	[ɔ]	(n/a)	Approximately as in "office" in British accent; the lips are much more rounded.
e	[ɯ̯ʌ], [ə]	e	a diphthong consisting first of a back, unrounded semivowel (which can be formed by first pronouncing "w" and then spreading the lips without changing the position of the tongue) followed by a vowel similar to English "duh". Many unstressed syllables in Chinese use the schwa [ə] (idea), and this is also written as e.
i	[i]	yi	like English bee.
u	[u]	wu	like English "oo"
ai	[aɪ̯]	ai	like English "eye", but a bit lighter
ei	[eɪ̯]	ei	as in "hey"
ui	[u̯eɪ̯]	wei	as u + ei;
ao	[ɑʊ̯]	ao	approximately as in "cow"; the a is much more audible than the o
iu	[i̯ɤʊ̯]	you	as i + ou
ie	[i̯ɛ]	ye	as i + ê; but is very short; e (pronounced like ê) is pronounced longer and carries the main stress (similar to the initial sound ye in yet)
an	[an]	an	as in "ban" in British English (a more open fronted a)
en	[ən]	en	as in "taken"
in	[in]	yin	as i + n
un	[yn]	yun	as ü + n;
ang	[ɑŋ]	ang	as in German Angst (starts with the vowel sound in father and ends in the velar nasal; like song in some dialects of American English)
eng	[əŋ]	eng	like e in en above but with ng added to it at the back
ing	[iŋ]	ying	as i + ng
ong	[ʊŋ], [u̯əŋ]	weng	starts with the vowel sound in book and ends with the velar nasal sound in sing; as u + eng in zero initial.

== Sample texts ==
Here is given an excerpt of the "kiş yiğen ğadın kiş" ('man-eating woman') story from Ma Wei, Ma Jianzhong & Kevin Stuart's work The Folklore of China's Islamic Salar Nationality.

Oholdı bir ninor vumış
aña kiciçiq anor vara
bir gunor nınaçuq anasini parlıcâni ziden yanba(r)
yarım yoldı ulır qarı ğadınkışor uçıramış
qari ğadınkişçıq daş işdende zoğziba(r)
bu ninaçıq yana vârcâni añnışmış'e qarı nina sen eyiñ bir kişçuğıñ munda natburi dimiş

Translation:

Long ago there was a granny.
She had a little daughter.
One day, the granny came back from the market with her daughter.
Halfway they run into an old woman.
The old woman was sitting on a stone.
This granny came towards her and struck up a conversation:
"Hey old granny, what are you doing here, one person all by yourself",
she said.

Article 1 of the Universal Declaration of Human Rights.

Heme kişler hür der, haysiyet ma haklarde adil der, mantik ma vicdan var, kardeşlikden davraneşge.

== Sources ==
- Hahn, R. F. 1988. Notes on the Origin and Development of the Salar Language, Acta Orientalia Hungarica XLII (2–3), 235–237.
- Dwyer, A. 1996. Salar Phonology. Unpublished dissertation University of Washington.
- Dwyer, A. M. 1998. The Turkic strata of Salar: An Oghuz in Chaghatay clothes? Turkic Languages 2, 49–83.
- Dwyer, Arienne M (2007). Salar: A Study in Inner Asian Language Contact Processes; Part 1: Phonology. Harrassowitz Verlag. ISBN 978-3-447-04091-4.
- Mǐnàwǎ'ěr Àibǐbùlā [米娜瓦尔•艾比布拉] (2024). Xīnjiāng Yīníng Sāláyǔ [新疆伊宁撒拉语]. Beijing: Commercial Press [商务印书馆].
