= Ceke =

Ceke may refer to:

- Chaka of Bulgaria, emperor of Bulgaria in 1299-1300
- Ceke, Inner Mongolia, a town in Ejin Banner, on the border with Outer Mongolia and the terminus of the Jiayuguan–Ceke Railway and the Linhe–Ceke Railway.
