= Lücheng ruins =

Ruins in Inner Mongolia, China

- Location on interactive map
- 41.73°N 101.277°E

绿城遗址
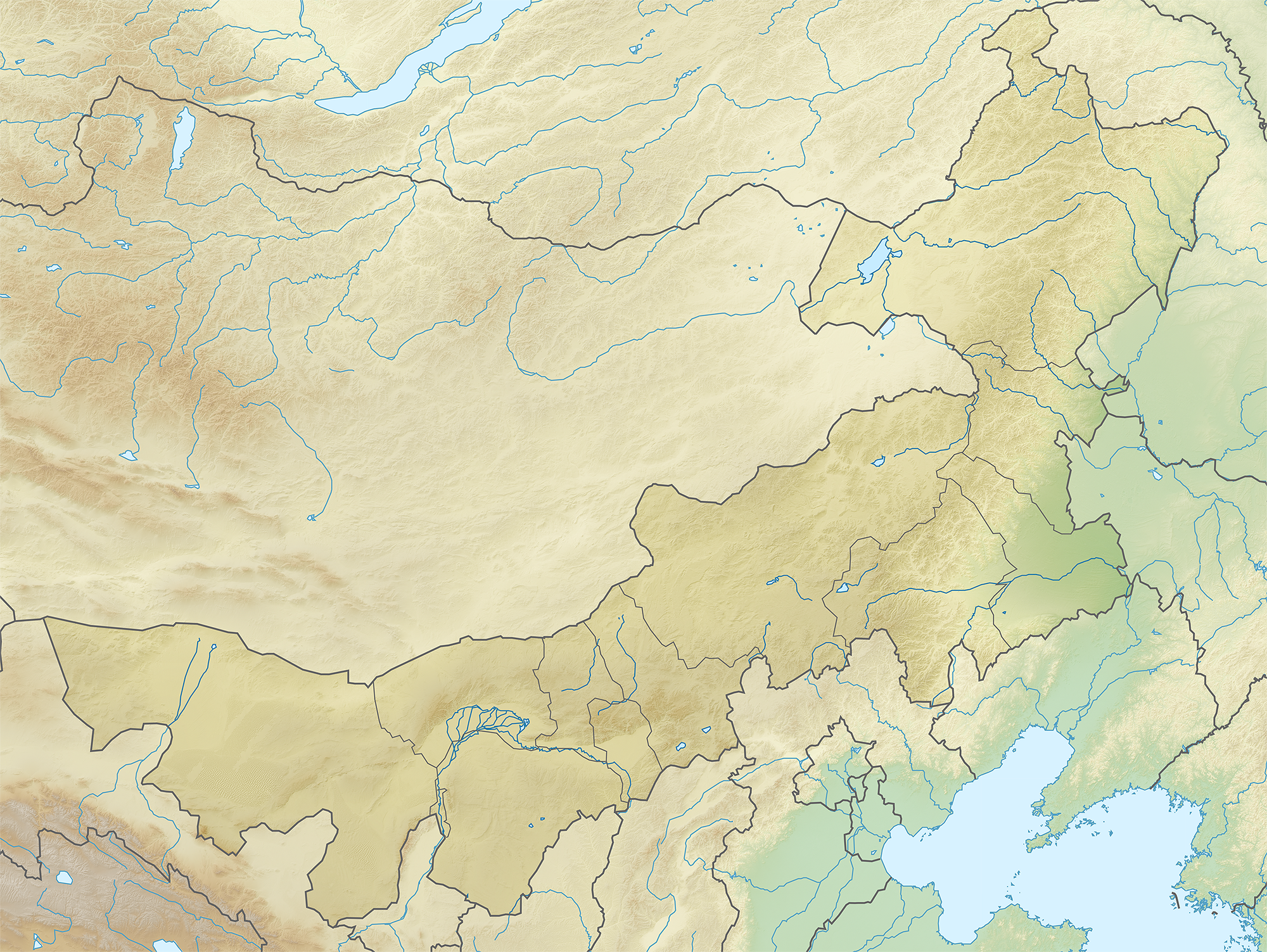
- Location within Inner Mongolia
- 41.73°N 101.277°E
- Periods: Bronze Age - around 1475
- Cultures: Han, Western Xia, Yuan
- Location: Bayan Toroi Sum, Ejin Banner, Alxa League, Inner Mongolia, China
- Region: Alashan Plateau semi-desert

Site notes
- Circumference: 1,205 m
- Public access: no

The Lücheng ruins, (Note: simplified Chinese: 绿城遗址; traditional Chinese: 緑城遺址; pinyin: Lǜchéng yízhǐ) literally from Chinese green city ruins, are an ancient city in Inner Mongolia, China.

== Location ==
The site is located in the township of Bayan Toroi, roughly 50 kilometers by car southeast of Dalaihubu Town, seat of Ejin Banner, Alxa League, at the far west of Inner Mongolia Autonomous Region. Historically, the area was once a fertile oasis with abundant water and vegetation, yet is now a desert zone within the Juyan Delta. About ten kilometers northwest lies Khara-Khoto, it too once ruled by the Tanguts.

== Ruins ==
Roughly square with a perimeter of 1,205 meters, the city walls were made of rammed earth with a thickness of 11-14 cm. The wall foundation is 3.5 meters wide, and the remaining height is up to 2 meters. There is a gate on the eastern side of the northern city wall with a barbican. The oval-shaped western wall is dated to the Bronze Age. In the western part of the city there are remains of a relatively well preserved stupa, with more remains of such across the city. Unearthed relics were dated from the Bronze Age to the Han, Western Xia, and Yuan dynasties. A canal runs through the city and leaves through the southern wall. Irrigation canals extend outwards to remains of ancient farmland dated to the Western Xia, with indications of abandonment in 1475.

== Burial complex ==
To the east of the city lies a large elevated burial complex. Based on excavation findings it was concluded that it is a brick-chambered tomb with an earthen mound from the Western Jin dynasty.

== Looting ==
It has been rumoured that ancient Tangut texts that surfaced around 2014 were looted from this site.

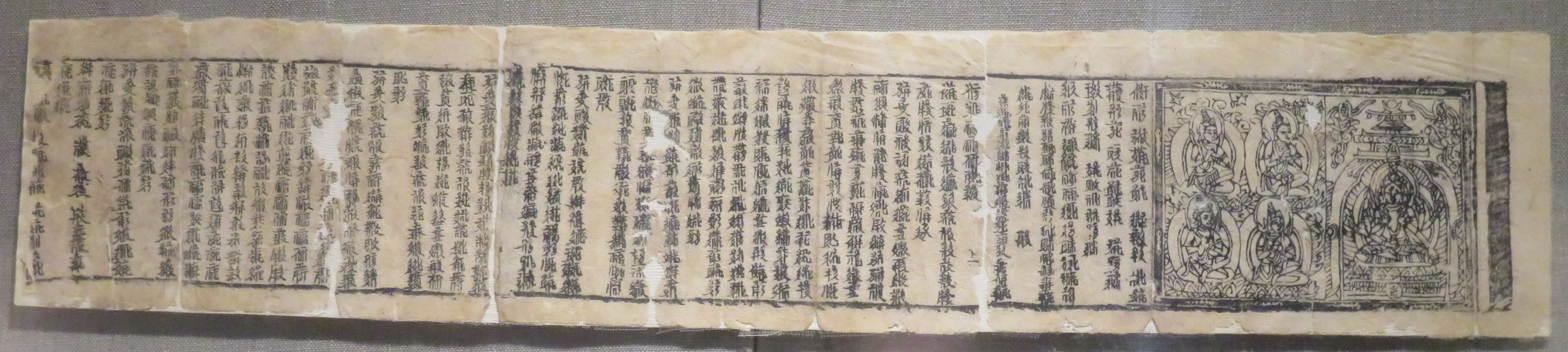
Printed Tangut dharani text, Inner Mongolia Museum, Hohhot

== Literature ==
- Chen Fahu (陈发虎), Wu Wei (吴薇), Zhu Yan (朱艳), J.A. Holmes, D.B. Madsen, Jin Ming (金明), C.G. Viatt. 阿拉善高原中全新世干旱事件的湖泊记录研究 [J]. 科学通报, 2004, 49(1).
- Jin Heling (靳鹤龄), Xiao Honglang (肖洪浪), Sun Liangying (孙良英), Zhang Hong (张洪), Sun Zhong (孙忠), Li Xiaozhe (李孝泽). 最近1500年黑河下游东居延海变迁与环境气候变化 [J]. 中国科学D辑, 2003, 33 (Supplement).
- Kazuki Moritani (森谷一樹). "漢代のエチナ、オアシス+蕟版資料からわかること" [M]. オアシス地域研究会報, 2005, 5(1).
- Li Bingcheng (李并成). 河西走廊历史时期沙漠化研究. Beijing: 科学出版社, 2003.
- Li Bingcheng (李并成). 居延古オアシス沙漠化考 [J]. オアシス地域研究会報, 2004, 4(2).
- Qu Wenchuan (瞿文川), Wu Ruijin (吴瑞金), Wang Sumin (王苏民), Zhang Zhenke (张振克). 近2600年来内蒙古居延海湖泊沉积物的色素含量及环境意义 [J]. 沉积学报, 2000, 18(1).
- Seyin (色音). 居延故地 [M]. Chengdu: 四川人民出版社, 2003.
