= Ejin Basin =

Ejin Basin may refer to:

- The drainage basin of the Ejin River
- The inland delta of the Ejin River in the area of the Juyan Lake
