= Ejin =

Ejin may refer to:

- Ejin Banner, subdivision of Inner Mongolia, China
- Ejin Basin (disambiguation)
- Ejin River, in Northern China
