= Kwanten =

Kwanten is a surname. Notable people with the surname include:

- Luc Kwanten (1944–2021), Belgian sinologist, Tangutologist, and literary agent
- Ryan Kwanten (born 1976), Australian actor and producer
