= Pearl in the Palm =

Chinese-Tangut glossary

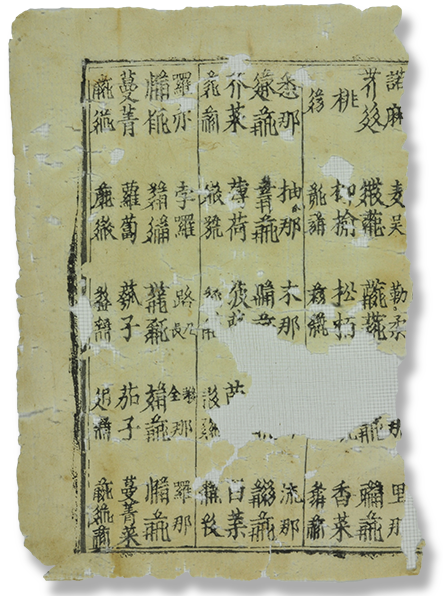
Page from the Pearl in the Palm found at the Northern Mogao Caves

The Pearl in the Palm or the Timely Pearl (Tangut: 𗼇𘂜𗿳𗖵𘃎𘇂𗊏; Chinese: 番漢合時掌中珠; pinyin: Fān-Hàn Héshí Zhǎngzhōngzhū) is a bilingual glossary between the Chinese and Tangut languages, compiled in 1190 by Gule Maocai (骨勒茂才) of the Western Xia dynasty. It survives as a single complete copy of a 12th-century woodblock printed book that was discovered in Khara-Khoto. In addition, a single page from a different copy of the same edition of the Pearl in the Palm was found at the Northern Mogao Caves in 1989. The book transcribes the pronunciation of Chinese words into Tangut characters, and the pronunciation of Tangut characters into Chinese characters, and so is a very important source for Tangut historical phonology, and was the primary source before the publication of monolingual Tangut dictionaries.

== Discovery ==
In 1909, the Russian explorer Pyotr Kozlov unearthed a number of texts and artefacts in Ejin Banner, Inner Mongolia, including the Pearl in the Palm and transported them back to St. Petersburg, Russia. There, Aleksei Ivanovich Ivanov, professor at Saint Petersburg State University, who was aware of its value, added it to his collection. It is now in the collection of the Institute of Oriental Manuscripts of the Russian Academy of Sciences in Saint Petersburg.

In 1912, Chinese scholars Luo Zhenyu and Feng Ge visited Ivanov upon learning about the work in his possession, and were given access to nine pages, which they photocopied for study. In 1922 Luo Zhenyu met Ivanov again, in Tianjin. It was only then he would have access to the full text, then ordered his son to make a full copy.

The Belgian scholar Luc Kwanten visited the Soviet Union in the late 1970s, and was able to photograph the whole of "The Pearl in the Palm". In 1982, the book finally saw the light of day when the photographed version was published in the United States.

== Content and style ==
The original book consists of 37 xylograph folios in concertina format. The preface is identical content written in both Chinese and Tangut. From the sentence "How can you mix with foreigners without learning foreign words, How can you be counted amongst the Han without learning Han words" (不學番言，則豈和番人之眾；不會漢語，則豈入漢人之數) it is clear that the book aimed to facilitate the Tanguts and the Chinese to learn each other's languages.

The book contains words 414 CPC, according to three powers are divided into nine categories: celestial bodies, celestial images, sky changes, terrestrial bodies, terrestrial images, terrestrial use, human body, human phase, human matters. One category is the most extensive content: personnel issues account for half of all the content.

Each entry contains four elements: from right to left, Tangut phonetics in Chinese, Tangut script, Chinese script, and Chinese phonetics in Tangut. The book is important in understanding and interpretation of the now dead Tangut language.
