= Ejin–Hami railway =

Railway line in China

Ejin–Hami railway or Eha railway (simplified Chinese: 额哈铁路; traditional Chinese: 額哈鐵路; pinyin: Éhā tiělù), is a railway in western China between Ejin Banner in Alxa League of western Inner Mongolia and the city of Hami in the eastern part of the Xinjiang Uyghur Autonomous Region. The line runs 644 km (400 mi) through the deserts near the Mongolian border. Apart from Inner Mongolia and Xinjiang, the line also crosses the Subei Mongol Autonomous County, the sliver of Gansu Province that extends to the Mongolian border. Construction began on June 30, 2014 and was slated to take three years, but the line opened only 17 months later on December 1, 2015. The opening of this rail line shortened the distance by rail from Hohhot, Inner Mongolia's capital, to destinations in Xinjiang and Kazakhstan by over 800 km.

== Line description ==
The Ejin–Hami railway is part of a rail corridor that will extend from Tianjin, on the Bohai Gulf in North China to Torugart Pass on the border with Kyrgyzstan. It begins in the east at the Chuandituo railway station (川地托站) on the Linhe–Ceke railway and runs due west to Hami East station on the Lanzhou–Xinjiang railway. Stations along route include Heiyingshan, Mazongshan, Mingshui, Wutongshui, Luotuoquanzi.

The line passes through desert wilderness with no water, electricity, cell phone signal or road transportation. Nine grand bridges, along with 37 large bridges, 121 mid-sized bridges and 1,863 viaducts were built. The line has a single-track, with the possibility of future electrification. The line was reported to cost 9.87 billion yuan to build.

== Rail connections ==
- Ceke: Linhe–Ceke railway, Jiayuguan–Ceke railway
- Hami: Lanzhou–Xinjiang railway, Hami–Lop Nur railway

== See also ==
- List of railways in China
