= Jiajing (disambiguation) =

The Jiajing Emperor (Chinese: 嘉靖帝; 1507–1567) was the 12th emperor of the Ming dynasty in ancient China.

Jiajing can also refer to:

- Lu Jiajing (Chinese: 逯佳境; born 1989), Chinese tennis player
- Jiajing Railway, railway in Gansu Province, China
- Jia Jing, a Marvel Comics characters known as Sprite
