= Linhe–Hami railway =

Railway line in Inner Mongolia, China

Linhe–Hami railway or Linha railway (Chinese: 临哈铁路; pinyin: Lín–Hā tiělù) is a railway in the Inner Mongolia Autonomous Region of northwestern China between Linhe District in Bayan Nur, and Hami in eastern Xinjiang in the west. It has a branch to Ceke, a border post in Ejin Banner on the China–Mongolia border. The railway is 1,390 km (864 mi) in total length, and runs entirely in desert regions. The line between Linhe and Ceke was built with investments of ¥4.27 billion. It opened to freight operations in December 2009 and passenger service in November 2010, but has been plagued by sandstorms and shifting dunes, which have buried tracks and disrupted service.

== Route ==
In the east, the Linhe–Ceke railway branches off the Baotou–Lanzhou railway at Linhe, on the Yellow River, and it runs due west through Hanggin Rear Banner, Tukemumiao, Suhongtu and Ejin to Ceke, where the line meets the Jiayuguan–Ceke railway. The Lince railway crosses the Ulanbuhe, Yamaleike, and the Badain Jaran Deserts, and over 500 km (311 mi) of track is laid in desert or Gobi terrain. Over 90% of the line lies in areas with no highway access. Of the line's 18 stations, 13 have no running water. The line has 180 bridges and 1,000 tunnels and underpasses, including passage ways for Mongolian gazelle in the 300 km (186 mi) of wilderness from Wuliji to Ejin.

The Ceke railway is designed to serve as part of a longer rail corridor between North China and Xinjiang, and to carry coal produced from the Nariin Sukhait mining complex (Ovoot Tolgoi) in southern Mongolia near Ceke. In the first year of operation, the line carried 390,000 tons of coal, and also delivered 3,000 tons of water, 15,000 barrels of drinking water and 20,000 kg of food to stations and remote communities along route.

== Operational history and problems ==
Since the Linhe–Ceke opened in December 2009, service has been adversely affected by sand storms and shifting dunes, which affects 390 km (242 mi) of track. Sand storms occur in the region on as many as 230 days per year, with sustained gusts reaching Level 11 on the Beaufort Scale. In the first year of operations, over 10,000 workers were mobilized and ¥71 million was spent to clear track, spread sand-control netting, build sand-restraint devices, and plant trees. Nine sand control centers were established along route. Service was suspended for two months in the spring of 2010, and when freight service was restored in July, traffic was reduced from eight pairs of trains per day to two pairs. In the first 36 days after passenger service was introduced in November 2010, sand storms buried track on 27 days and caused 51 service disruptions. Sand storms have reduced effective speed on eight sections of track between Suhongtu to Swan Lake to 25 km/h (16 mph).

When passenger service began in November 2010, a 1,100 km (684 mi) journey from Hohhot to Ejin took 14 hours and 55 minutes. As of October 2012, schedule systems showed one daily train between these points, with similar travel times. The schedule shows no stops between the Linhe Station and Ejin, presumably because no one lives there.

In 2011 and 2012, the line carried, respectively, 1.39 and 1.1 million metric tons of coal.

== Rail connections ==
- Linhe District, Bayannur, Inner Mongolia: Baotou–Lanzhou railway
- Ceke, Inner Mongolia: Jiayuguan–Ceke railway
- Chuandituo (川地托), Inner Mongolia: Ejin–Hami railway

== See also ==
- List of railways in China
- Rail transport in Inner Mongolia
