= Ulaanbaatar City Museum =

Museum in Bayanzürkh, Ulaanbaatar, Mongolia

Coordinates: 47°55′5.7″N 106°56′9.9″E

- Улаанбаатар хотын музей ᠤᠯᠠᠭᠠᠨᠪᠠᠭᠠᠲᠤᠷ ᠬᠣᠲᠠ ᠶᠢᠨ ᠮᠦᠽᠧᠢ
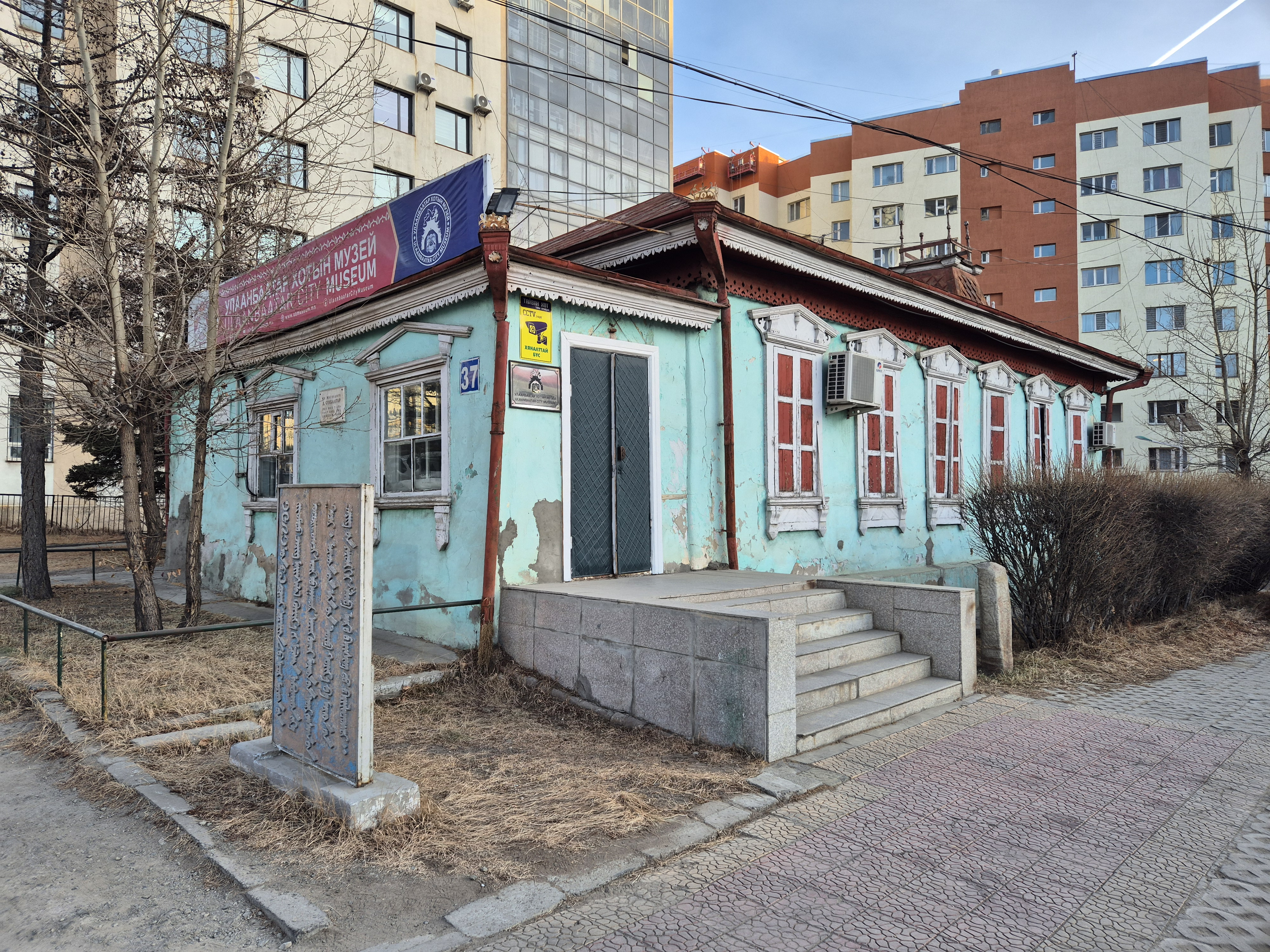
- Museum in 2024
- Established: 1960
- Location: Bayanzürkh, Ulaanbaatar, Mongolia
- Type: History museum
- Collection size: 3,832
- Visitors: c. 2500 per year
- Website: Official website

The Ulaanbaatar City Museum (Mongolian: Улаанбаатар хотын музей) is a museum dedicated to the history of Ulaanbaatar, the capital of Mongolia. The museum building is a landmark of early 20th century Mongolian architecture.

== History of the building ==
The building was originally built by the Buryat Russian merchant and discoverer of Khara Khoto, Tsogto Garmayevich Badmazhapov, in 1904, for his personal use. From July to August 1921, the Mongolian People's Republic's Central Committee, government and combined staff were located here, with Damdin Sükhbaatar in residence. In the 1930s, the building housed the embassy of the Tuvan People's Republic, and it was subsequently converted into a Museum for Sükhbaatar. However, in 1953, after the death of Khorloogiin Choibalsan, and the adoption of a resolution to establish a joint museum for Sükhbaatar and Choibalsan, the building was converted into a printing house.

== Museum ==
The museum was first established as an exhibition dedicated to the history of Ulaanbaatar which opened on 9 July 1956. In 1960, a resolution of the Central Committee of the Mongolian People's Republic made the exhibition permanent and relocated it to the current building, establishing it as the Museum of the History and Reconstruction of Ulaanbaatar (Mongolian: Улаанбаатар хотын түүх шинэчлэн байгуулалтын музей). In 1970, by a resolution of the Council of Ministers, the building was placed under protection as a site of architectural significance. In 2011, the museum was given its current title.

The museum covers the history of Ulaanbaatar from the time of Zanabazar to the present day. In total, the museum contains 134 documents, 224 silver objects, 30 archaeological finds, 16 geological charts, 132 historical exhibits, 335 pictures, 77 printed boards and models, 54 drawings, diagrams and plans, 898 photographs, 36 albums, 1883 slides, negatives and diafilms, 27 audio and video records, 62 commemorative items, and 234 books: in total 3,832 accessioned objects.

On International Museum Day (18 May), Children's Day (1 June), the city's birthday (26 October) and Independence Day (26 December), the museum's entrance fee is waived.

== See also ==
- List of museums in Mongolia
