= Dongfeng, Ejin Banner =

Dongfeng 东风镇 ᠳ᠋ᠦᠩ ᠹᠧᠩ
- Town
- Location in Inner Mongolia
- Coordinates: 40°39′16″N 101°24′01″E
- Country: People's Republic of China
- Region: Inner Mongolia
- League: Alxa
- Banner: Ejin
- Elevation: 1,051 m (3,448 ft)
- Time zone: UTC+8 (China Standard)
- Area code: 0483

Dongfeng (simplified Chinese: 东风; traditional Chinese: 東風; pinyin: Dōngfēng; lit. 'east wind') Dün fyen (Mongolian: ᠳ᠋ᠦᠩ
ᠹᠧᠩ; Дүн фен) is a town of Ejin Banner in western Inner Mongolia, China, located in the Gobi Desert near a cluster of dry lakes and 54 nautical miles (100 km; 62 mi) from the Jiuquan Satellite Launch Center. As of 2011, it has 3 villages under its administration.

== See also ==
- List of township-level divisions of Inner Mongolia
