= Hami–Lop Nur railway =

Railway line in Xinjiang, China

Hami–Lop Nur railway or Haluo railway (simplified Chinese: 哈罗铁路; traditional Chinese: 哈羅鐵路; pinyin: hāluó tiělù), is a railway in the eastern part of the Xinjiang Uyghur Autonomous Region of China between Hami and Lop Nur. The line is 374.83 km (233 mi) long and began commercial operation on November 29, 2012. Construction began in August 2010 and track laying was completed in late July 2012. The Lop Nur terminal of the line is near the industrial facility at 40.463608°N 90.864700°E.

The line is mainly used to ship potassium salts mined near Lop Nur.

To ensure the supply of daily necessities for the staff along the line, commuter trains are officially launched from November 21, 2013, and commuter cars open every five days.

== Rail connections ==
- Hami: Lanzhou–Xinjiang railway, Ejin–Hami railway

== Stations ==
- Hami South (哈密南)
- Huayuanxiang (花园乡)
- Nanhu (南湖)
- Shaha (沙哈)
- Bate (巴特)
- Lianyushan (鲢鱼山)
- Heilongfeng (黑龙峰)
- Duotoushan (多头山)
- Dongtaidi (东台地)
- Luozhong (罗中)

== See also ==
- List of railways in China
