= Hanggin Rear Banner =

Hanggin Rear Banner 杭锦后旗 • ᠬᠠᠩᠭᠢᠨ ᠬᠣᠶᠢᠲᠤ ᠬᠣᠰᠢᠭᠤ
- Banner
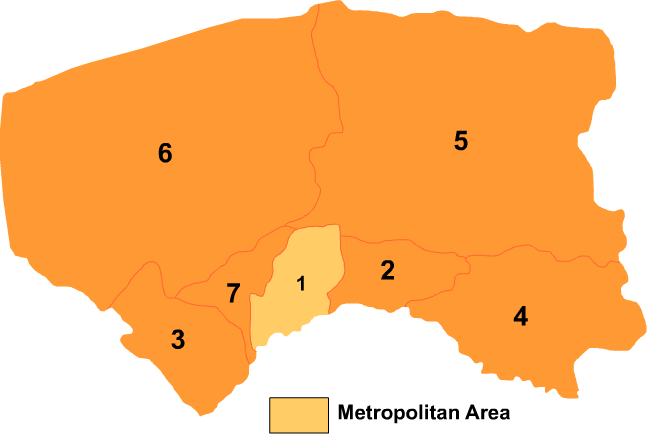
- Bayannur divisions: Hanggin Rear Banner is 7 on this map

- Location of the seat in Inner Mongolia Hanggin Rear (China)
- Coordinates: 40°49′45″N 107°00′47″E
- Country: China
- Autonomous region: Inner Mongolia
- Prefecture-level city: Bayannur
- Banner seat: Shanba

Area
  - Total: 1,791 km^{2} (692 sq mi)

Population (2020)
  - Total: 217,573
  - Density: 121.5/km^{2} (314.6/sq mi)
- Time zone: UTC+8 (China Standard)
- Website: www.hjhq.gov.cn

Hanggin Rear Banner

Chinese name
- Simplified Chinese: 杭锦后旗
- Traditional Chinese: 杭錦後旗
Transcriptions
Standard Mandarin
- Hanyu Pinyin: Hángjǐn Hòuqí
Yue: Cantonese
- Jyutping: hong^{4}gam^{2} hau^{6}kei^{4}

Mongolian name
- Mongolian Cyrillic: Хангин хойд хошуу
- Mongolian script: ᠬᠠᠩᠭᠢᠨ ᠬᠣᠶᠢᠲᠤ ᠬᠣᠰᠢᠭᠤ
Transcriptions
- SASM/GNC: Qaŋɣin Qoyitu qosiɣu

Hanggin Rear Banner (Mongolian: ᠬᠠᠩᠭᠢᠨ ᠬᠣᠶᠢᠲᠤ ᠬᠣᠰᠢᠭᠤ; Chinese: 杭锦后旗) is a banner in the west of the Inner Mongolia, China. It has an area of 1,767 km^{2} (682 sq mi) and 217,573 inhabitants (2020).

== Administrative divisions ==
Hanggin Rear Banner is made up of 9 towns. The banner's seat of government is located in Shanba.

| Name | Simplified Chinese | Hanyu Pinyin | Mongolian (Hudum Script) | Mongolian (Cyrillic) | Administrative division code |
|---|---|---|---|---|---|
Towns
| Shanba Town (Shenpa) | 陕坝镇 | Shǎnbà Zhèn | ᠱᠠᠮᠪᠠ ᠪᠠᠯᠭᠠᠰᠤ | Шамба балгас | 150826100 |
| Toudaoqiao Town | 头道桥镇 | Tóudàoqiáo Zhèn | ᠲᠧᠦ ᠳ᠋ᠣᠤ ᠴᠢᠶᠣᠤ ᠪᠠᠯᠭᠠᠰᠤ | Дүү доо чяо балгас | 150826101 |
| Erdaoqiao Town | 二道桥镇 | Èrdàoqiáo Zhèn | ᠡᠯ ᠳ᠋ᠣᠤ ᠴᠢᠶᠣᠤ ᠪᠠᠯᠭᠠᠰᠤ | Эл доо чяо балгас | 150826102 |
| Sandaoqiao Town | 三道桥镇 | Sāndàoqiáo Zhèn | ᠰᠠᠨ ᠳ᠋ᠣᠤ ᠴᠢᠶᠣᠤ ᠪᠠᠯᠭᠠᠰᠤ | Сан доо чяо балгас | 150826103 |
| Manggis Town (Manhui) | 蛮会镇 | Mánhuì Zhèn | ᠮᠠᠩᠭᠢᠰᠤ ᠪᠠᠯᠭᠠᠰᠤ | Мангис балгас | 150826104 |
| Tuanjie Town | 团结镇 | Tuánjié Zhèn | ᠲᠤᠸᠠᠨ ᠵᠢᠶᠧ ᠪᠠᠯᠭᠠᠰᠤ | Туван жье балгас | 150826105 |
| Shuangmiao Town | 双庙镇 | Shuāngmiào Zhèn | ᠱᠤᠸᠠᠩ ᠮᠢᠶᠣᠤ ᠪᠠᠯᠭᠠᠰᠤ | Сойн мяо балгас | 150826106 |
| Shahai Town | 沙海镇 | Shāhǎi Zhèn | ᠱᠠ ᠬᠠᠢ ᠪᠠᠯᠭᠠᠰᠤ | Шаа хай балгас | 150826107 |
| Menghai Town | 蒙海镇 | Ménghǎi Zhèn | ᠮᠧᠩ ᠬᠠᠢ ᠪᠠᠯᠭᠠᠰᠤ | Мэн хай балгас | 150826108 |

Other: Taiyangmiao Farm (太阳庙农场)

== Climate ==
Climate data for Hanggin Rear Banner, elevation 1,024 m (3,360 ft), (1991–2020 normals, extremes 1981–present)
| Month | Jan | Feb | Mar | Apr | May | Jun | Jul | Aug | Sep | Oct | Nov | Dec | Year |
|---|---|---|---|---|---|---|---|---|---|---|---|---|---|
| Record high °C (°F) | 8.8 (47.8) | 14.5 (58.1) | 22.6 (72.7) | 32.4 (90.3) | 36.1 (97.0) | 37.6 (99.7) | 38.4 (101.1) | 37.4 (99.3) | 35.9 (96.6) | 27.5 (81.5) | 19.5 (67.1) | 12.0 (53.6) | 38.4 (101.1) |
| Mean daily maximum °C (°F) | −3.6 (25.5) | 1.8 (35.2) | 10.3 (50.5) | 18.8 (65.8) | 24.8 (76.6) | 28.9 (84.0) | 30.2 (86.4) | 28.6 (83.5) | 23.7 (74.7) | 16.3 (61.3) | 6.0 (42.8) | −2.0 (28.4) | 15.3 (59.6) |
| Daily mean °C (°F) | −10.3 (13.5) | −5.7 (21.7) | 2.7 (36.9) | 11.1 (52.0) | 17.6 (63.7) | 22.2 (72.0) | 23.8 (74.8) | 21.8 (71.2) | 15.9 (60.6) | 8.6 (47.5) | 0.2 (32.4) | −7.9 (17.8) | 8.3 (47.0) |
| Mean daily minimum °C (°F) | −15.6 (3.9) | −11.6 (11.1) | −3.8 (25.2) | 3.3 (37.9) | 9.6 (49.3) | 15 (59) | 17.4 (63.3) | 15.5 (59.9) | 9.4 (48.9) | 2.6 (36.7) | −4.2 (24.4) | −12.7 (9.1) | 2.1 (35.7) |
| Record low °C (°F) | −28.4 (−19.1) | −25.7 (−14.3) | −20.7 (−5.3) | −10.3 (13.5) | −2.5 (27.5) | 5.2 (41.4) | 9.8 (49.6) | 5.4 (41.7) | −3.1 (26.4) | −8.1 (17.4) | −20.6 (−5.1) | −26.8 (−16.2) | −28.4 (−19.1) |
| Average precipitation mm (inches) | 0.6 (0.02) | 1.3 (0.05) | 3.4 (0.13) | 4.6 (0.18) | 12.1 (0.48) | 25.6 (1.01) | 32.2 (1.27) | 32.4 (1.28) | 23.9 (0.94) | 4.9 (0.19) | 2.0 (0.08) | 0.8 (0.03) | 143.8 (5.66) |
| Average precipitation days (≥ 0.1 mm) | 0.8 | 0.7 | 1.4 | 1.4 | 3.5 | 5.3 | 6.9 | 7.0 | 4.7 | 2.0 | 0.9 | 0.8 | 35.4 |
| Average snowy days | 1.8 | 1.2 | 1.4 | 0.4 | 0 | 0 | 0 | 0 | 0 | 0.2 | 1.1 | 1.5 | 7.6 |
| Average relative humidity (%) | 53 | 43 | 38 | 32 | 36 | 47 | 58 | 61 | 57 | 53 | 57 | 54 | 49 |
| Mean monthly sunshine hours | 225.5 | 228.0 | 273.6 | 291.5 | 324.4 | 309.7 | 303.3 | 291.4 | 262.4 | 267.5 | 225.8 | 216.7 | 3,219.8 |
| Percentage possible sunshine | 75 | 75 | 73 | 73 | 72 | 69 | 67 | 69 | 71 | 79 | 77 | 76 | 73 |
Source: China Meteorological Administration all-time extreme

== Transportation ==
Hanggin Rear Banner is served by the Linhe-Ceke Railway.
