= Tsogto Badmazhapov =

Russian translator and explorer (1879–1937)

- Цогто Бадмажапов
- Born: 1879; Glagolcheskaya, Troitskosavsk, Russian Empire (now Kyakhta, Republic of Buryatia, Russia)
- Died: 15 December 1937 (aged 57–58); Novosibirsk, Novosibirsk Oblast, RSFSR. USSR
- Occupations: Explorer, Mongolist, diplomat, translator, noncomissioned officer
- Years active: Russia (1899-1914); Mongolia (1914-1931)
- Awards: Lesser silver medal of the Russian Geographical Society

Tsogto Garmayevich Badmazhapov (Russian: Цогто Гармаевич Бадмажапов; 1879–1937) was a Buryat Russian translator, Mongolist, and discoverer of the city of Khara-Khoto.

== Biography ==
An ethnic Buryat, he was a native of Troitskosavsk district in the Transbaikal Oblast of the Russian Empire. Badmazhapov worked for a trading company based at Kyakhta, "Sobennikov and Molchanov Brothers" under Bazar Baradin.

In his capacity as a translator and explorer with the rank of senior warden (uryadnik) he participated in the Mongol-Tibetan Expedition of Pyotr Kozlov, where he discovered the ancient city of Khara-Khoto in 1907. Kozlov never acknowledged this discovery, which only became known after the collapse of the Soviet Union.

He was executed during the Great Purge in 1937 on charges of participating in a counter-revolutionary conspiracy against the Mongolian People's Republic.

Badmazhapov's home in Urga is now the Historical Museum of Ulan-Bator.
