= Jiayuguan–Ceke railway =

Railway line in China

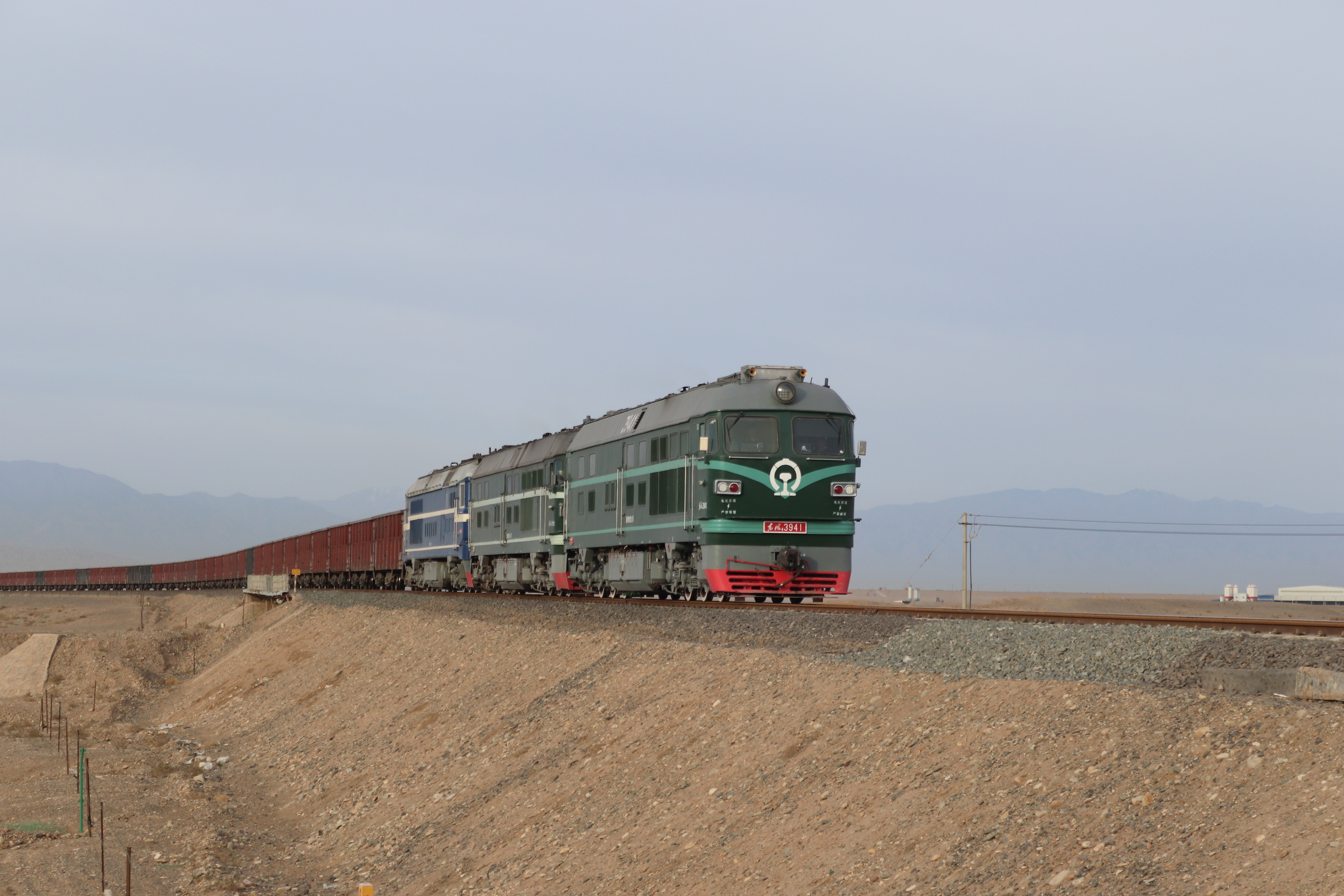
DF4 and DF8 trucks moving on the Jiayuguan-Ceke railway

The Jiayuguan–Ceke railway (嘉峪关-策克铁路) or Jiace railway (嘉策铁路) is a railway in northwestern China between Jiayuguan in Gansu Province and Ceke (42°34′00″N 101°18′00″E), a border post in Ejin Banner of Inner Mongolia on the China-Mongolian border. The railway is 460 km (286 mi) in length and was built from April 2004 to June 2007, and was financed by the Jiuquan Steel Company for its exclusive use to transport coal from Inner Mongolia and Mongolia. It is the longest railway financed by an enterprise in China. The line connects the Lanzhou-Xinjiang and the Linhe-Ceke railway. Planning is under way for a 50 km (31 mi) extension of the railway into Mongolia's Nariin Sukhait mining complex (Ovoot Tolgoi). In 2011 and 2012, the line carried, respectively, 1.21 and 1.17 million metric tons of coal.

== Rail connections ==
- Jiayuguan: Lanzhou–Xinjiang railway, Jiajing railway
- Ceke: Linhe–Ceke railway, Ejin–Hami railway

== See also ==
- List of railways in China
- Rail transport in Inner Mongolia
