= Badain Jaran Desert =

Desert in China

- Chinese: 巴丹吉林沙漠 pinyin: Bādānjílín Shāmò
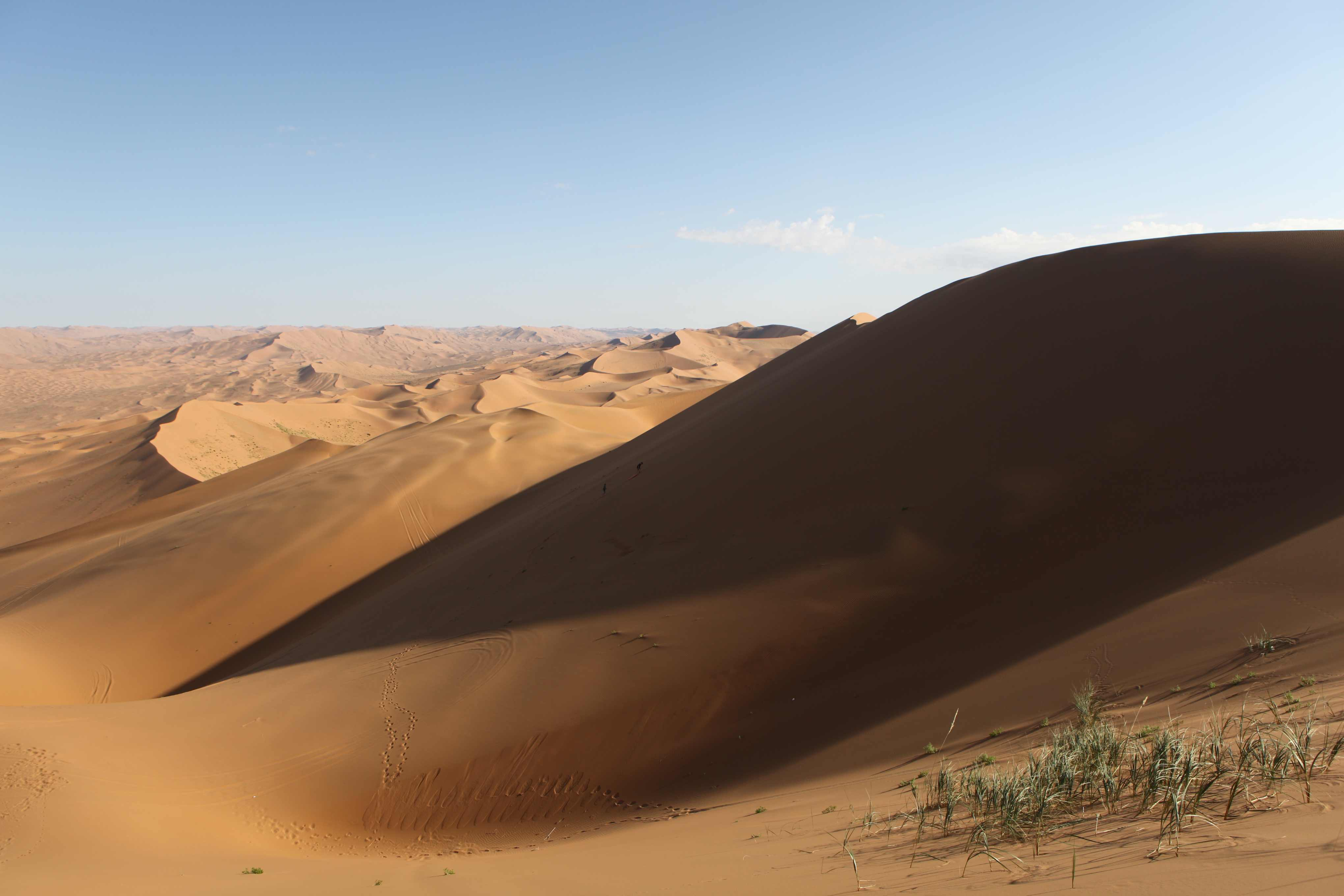

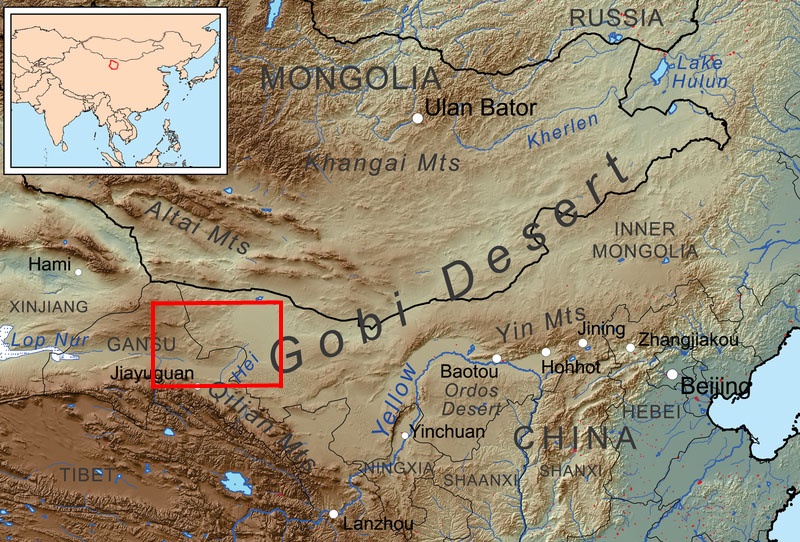
- The Badain Jaran lies in the People's Republic of China as a section of the Gobi Desert.
- Area: 49,000 km^{2} (19,000 mi^{2})

Geography
- Country: China
- Provinces of China: Inner Mongolia Autonomous Region; Gansu Province; Ningxia Province
- Coordinates: 40°4′21″N 102°12′36″E

UNESCO World Heritage Site
- Official name: Badain Jaran Desert - Towers of Sand and Lakes
- Type: Natural
- Criteria: vii, viii
- Designated: 2024 (46th session)
- Reference no.: 1638
- Region: List of World Heritage Sites in Asia

The Badain Jaran Desert (Chinese: 巴丹吉林沙漠; pinyin: Bādānjílín Shāmò) is a desert in Gansu and Inner Mongolia, China. It covers an area of 49,000 square kilometers (19,000 sq mi; 12,000,000 acres). By size it is the third largest desert in China.

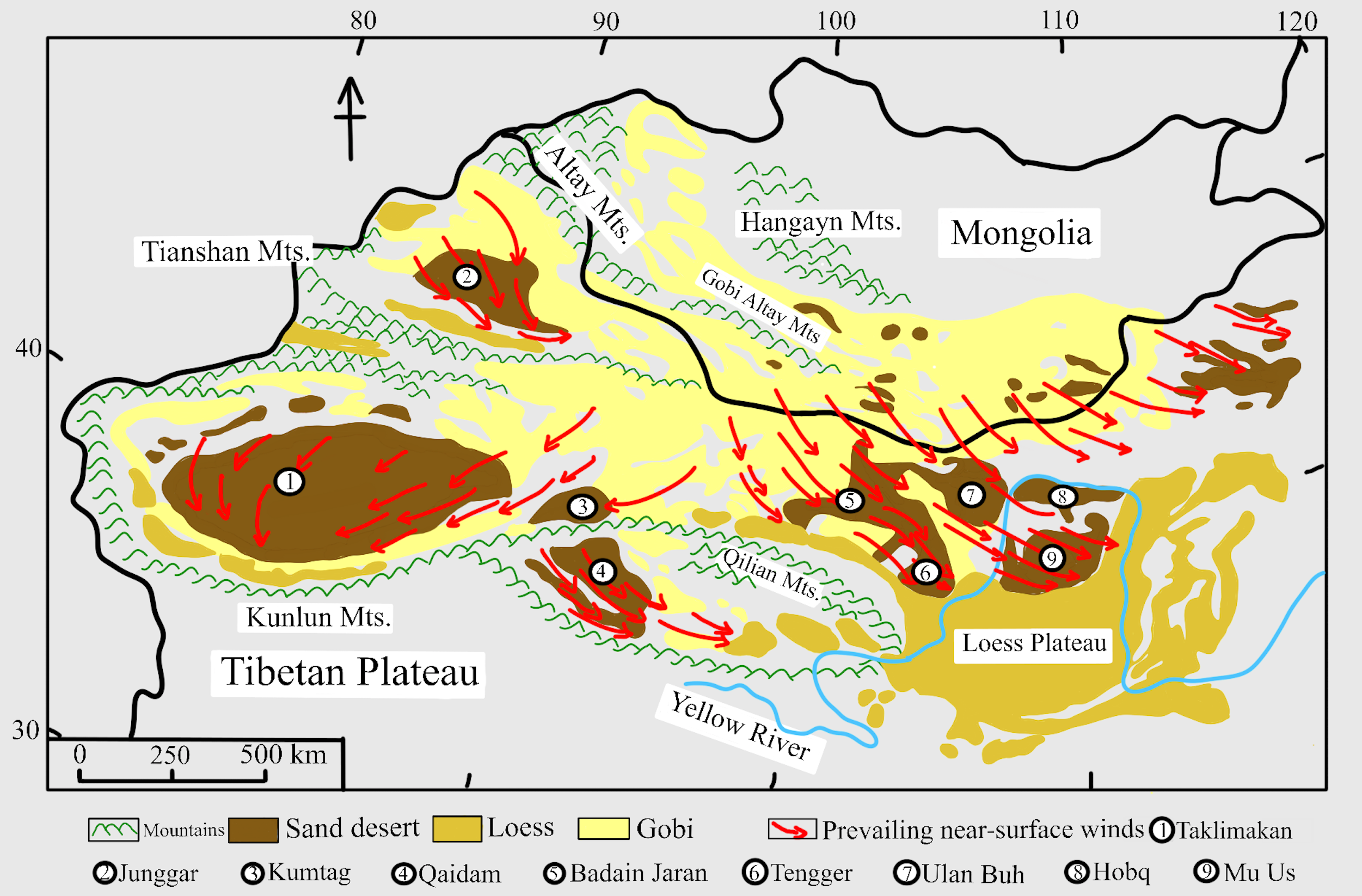
5 - Badain Jaran Desert

This desert is home to some of the tallest stationary dunes on Earth, with some reaching a height of more than 500 meters (1,600 ft; 0.31 mi), although most average at around 200 meters (660 ft). Its tallest dune is also measured, from base to peak, as the world's third tallest dune and highest stationary dune in the world.

The desert also features over 100 spring-fed lakes that lie between the dunes, some of which are fresh water while others are extremely saline. These lakes give the desert its name which is Mongolian for "mysterious lakes". These lakes are not completely studied and high pH lakes harbor extremely interesting animal communities. It is also crossed by one river, the Ruo Shui ("weak water"), which has formed an alluvial plain in the desert.

== Geography ==
Measuring over 49,000 square kilometers (19,000 sq mi), the Badain Jaran Desert covers a significant part of the Alxa League, Inner Mongolia Autonomous Region, as well as a northern part of Gansu province. Located in the Alxa Plateau at about 1,200 meters (3,900 ft) above sea level it is listed as a subsection to the Gobi Desert. It is bound to the north by the Gobi and to the East by Mount Lang which separates it from the Ulan Buh Desert (Pinyin: wū lán bù hé shā mò Chinese: 乌兰布和沙漠).

Although most of the dunes in the desert are not stationary, the larger ones usually ranging above 200 meters (660 ft) are static. With these dunes only the shallow surface of the sand is constantly shifting. The middle and lower layers of the highest dunes have been compacted for more than 20,000 years causing the sand particles to harden resulting in solid layers of sand and sandstone. High moisture levels inside the dunes also contribute to maintain their fixed state. This rigid structure also allows peaks, cliffs, gullies and even caves to form as a result of water erosion and desertification.

The Badain Jaran Desert, like the Tengger Desert which lies to the east (and with which the Badain Jaran Desert is currently merging due to extensive desertification) is about one-half barren, sandy desert and one-half a mixture of solid bedrock and loose gravel. Several small lakes and oases scatter the desert around which limited vegetation is able to grow.

=== Lakes ===
The Badain Jaran Desert is well known for its numerous scattered and colorful lakes. Containing more than 140 lakes they are mainly found in the southern region in the desert. These lakes can easily be found in the larger valleys between large dunes, believed to provide the life sustenance in the desert supporting camels, goats and horses which are herded by nomads that travel through the desert. Most lakes also support a green ring of vegetation that populate the close vicinity around the lakes.

Throughout the desert some lakes change color due to large populations of algae, Brine shrimp and mineral formations at different times in year. Evaporation can also allow others to turn into a hypersaline lake forming a salt crust around the rim of the lake.

Although their true sources are still debated it is believed that they are being maintained by underground water streams. Most arid deserts in China are surrounded by mountains that provide water sources, and this is the case with the Badain Jaran Desert. Runoff from the mountains is then collected through gravel deposits and this allows them to run through the desert, providing water sources for the scattered oases.

Within the desert there can be two main types of lakes found regarding their morphometry. The largely elongated shallow lakes mainly appear in the megadune area in the southeastern margin of the desert. Their depth often reaches less than 2 meters (7 ft) and only measure about 0.2 square kilometers (0.077 sq mi; 49 acres). The oval-shaped, deep lakes can also be found in the compound transverse megadune area. Their maximum depth reaches around 15 meters (50 ft) and attain a maximum size of around 1.5 square kilometers (0.58 sq mi; 370 acres). The lake water can be extremely saline. The shallow lakes in the southeastern region of the desert tend to have low salt concentration, averaging at less than 20 grams per liter (0.67 oz/U.S. qt; 0.80 oz/imp qt). Other lakes can show higher salt concentrations going up to more than 330 grams per liter (11 oz/U.S. qt; 13 oz/imp qt).

=== Singing Dunes ===
The Badain Jaran megadunes is one of the few places where the singing sand phenomenon occurs, in which the sand emits a sharp, loud noise that can be maintained for more than a minute. Although it is not fully understood, it is believed that it is caused by an electrostatic charge that is generated as wind pulls the top layers of sand down a dune slope. This will produce a low pitched rumble that can reach over 105 decibels. The "singing" starts with an avalanche of sand down the leeward face of a large dune. This phenomenon requires very specific circumstances to generate the sound. The dunes are silent throughout winter when humidity is retained in the sand. In the summer, when the sand is dry, the booming can be generated, but only on a slope of at least 30 degrees or more, on the leeward face of a dune; the same sand on the shallow, windward side cannot generate any noise. This phenomenon is only shared by around 35 other beaches and deserts around the world.

Under the same circumstances, it is also possible to generate another acoustic phenomenon. Moving a hand gently through the dry sand of a "booming sand dune" will shear the upper layer of sand off the slope and generate a burping sound emission (pulse-like, short bursts of sound).

=== Dunes ===
The Badain Jaran Desert is made up of hundreds of dunes ranging from small to large. Most of the megadunes in the desert average about 400 meters (1,300 ft) from the base while the rest average around 200 meters (660 ft). Out of all the megadunes, the Bilutu Peak (Chinese: 必鲁图峰; pinyin: Bìlǔtú Fēng) is the most famous. It towers at 500 meters (1,600 ft) from the base and is the tallest dune in Asia, (third tallest in the world). Unlike most of the smaller dunes the Bilutu Peak is stationary which makes it the world's tallest stationary dune.

While the larger megadunes are stationary (with only the top layer of sand shifting), the smaller dunes are constantly shifting according to wind patterns. This makes desertification a problem in surrounding areas as the desert is constantly expanding.

== Climate ==
The average annual rainfall is only between 50 and 60 mm (2.0 and 2.4 in) and is mainly centered between June and August; however, the evaporation of precipitation is between 40 and 80 times than that of rainfall. Winter and spring have very strong winds coming mainly from the northwest getting to more than 60 days long. These winds can get up to wind force 8.

Average Temperature in Badain Jaran
Description	Average Temperature
Annual Mean	8 °C (46 °F)
Absolute Low	−30 °C (−22 °F)
Absolute High	41 °C (106 °F)

== Tourist attractions ==
=== Badain Jaran Temple ===
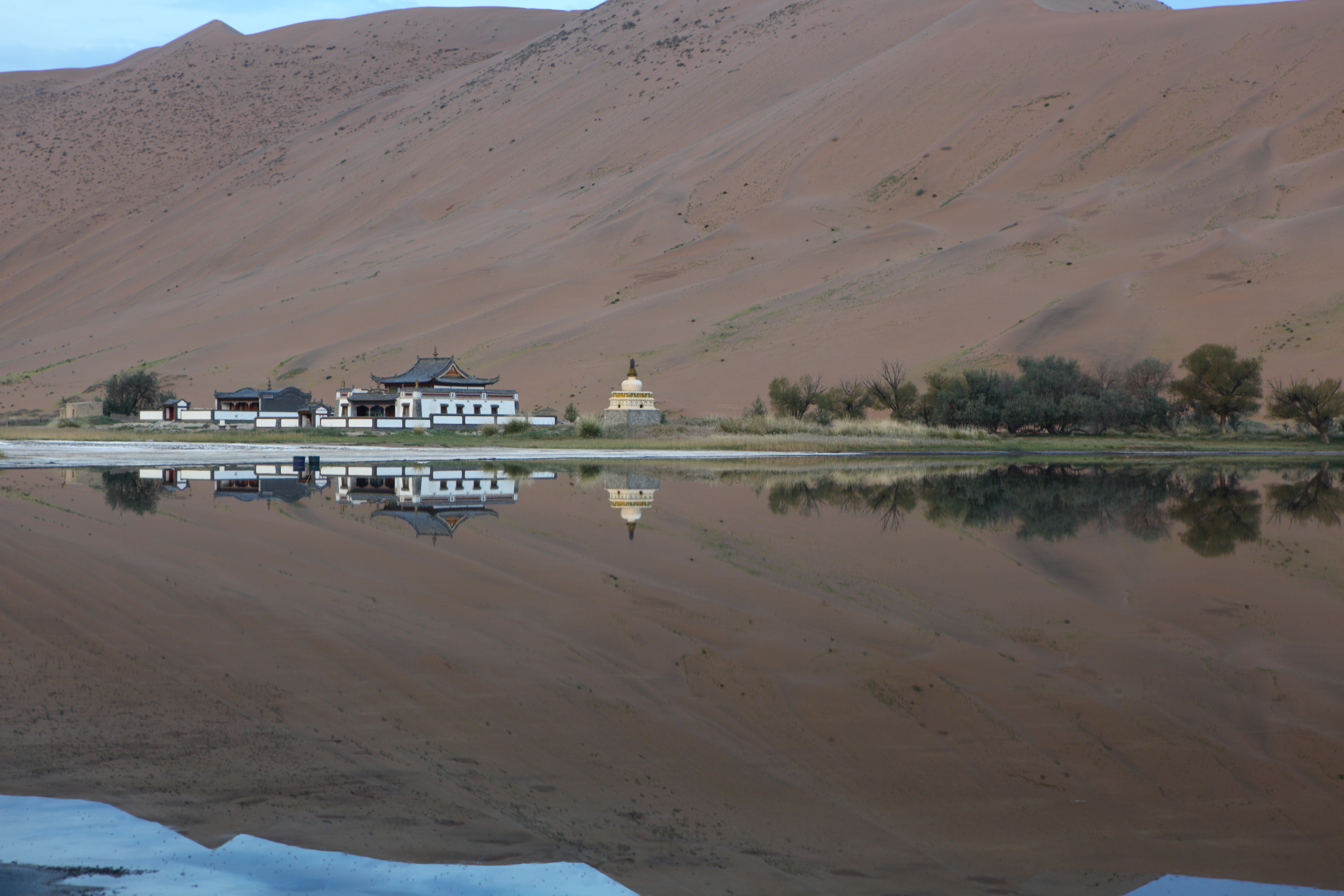
The Badain Jaran Temple in September alongside its lake

The Badain Jaran Temple (bā dān jí lín miào 巴丹吉林庙) is a well-preserved Tibetan-Buddhist temple located in the middle of the desert. It was built in 1868 at the side of a lake. Its isolation allowed it to survive untouched and safe from the Cultural Revolution.

=== Bilutu Peak ===
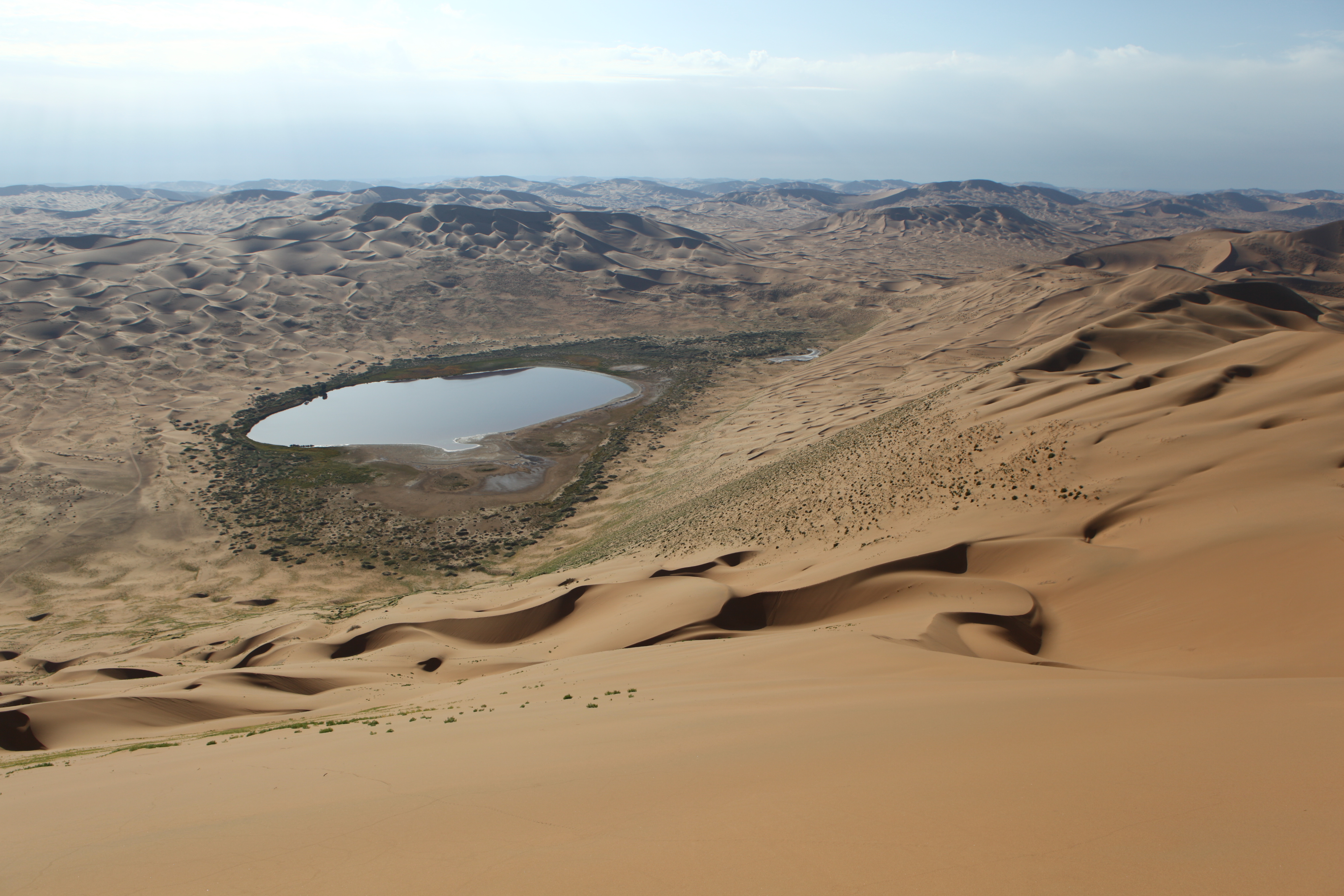
View from Bilutu Peak

Bilutu Peak (必鲁图峰) is also a location which is commonly accessed using the sandjeeps. It is the world's highest stationary dune rising 450 meters (1,480 ft) over the surrounding area, and peaking at 1,611 meters (5,285 ft) above sea level. The surrounding dunes only reach about 200 meters (660 ft). Although the biggest, it is one of several large stationary dunes within the Badain Jaran Desert.

=== Khara Khoto ===
Also known as the ancient black city, it is located in the northwestern side of the desert near the Ruo Shui River and is located fairly close to the new city of Ejin. The ancient city was a Tangut city founded in 1032 which became the center of the Tangut empire. When Genghis Khan conquered the city it flourished again under Mongol rule. However, the city fell to Chinese armies in 1372 during the Ming dynasty and was left abandoned and in ruins. It has been untouched since.

=== Jiabiangou Labor Camp ===
The infamous Jiabiangou Labor Camp was located on the edge of the desert and 27 kilometers (17 mi) from Jiuquan, Gansu. Between 1957 and 1961, the camp was used for "re-education through labor" to imprison intellectuals and former government officials that were declared to be "rightist" in the Anti-Rightist Movement of the Communist Party. Out of 3,000 prisoners, 2,500 died between 1957 and 1960, during the height of the Great Chinese Famine. The remains of the camp and the unmarked graveyards were poorly maintained and are heavily guarded by the Communist Chinese government. Relatives of the dead are only permitted during the time of Qingming. In November 2013, a memorial dedicated to the dead was quickly destroyed by the local government. Many graves and human remains were also removed since then to prevent people from visiting.
