= Jiajing Railway =

Railway line in China

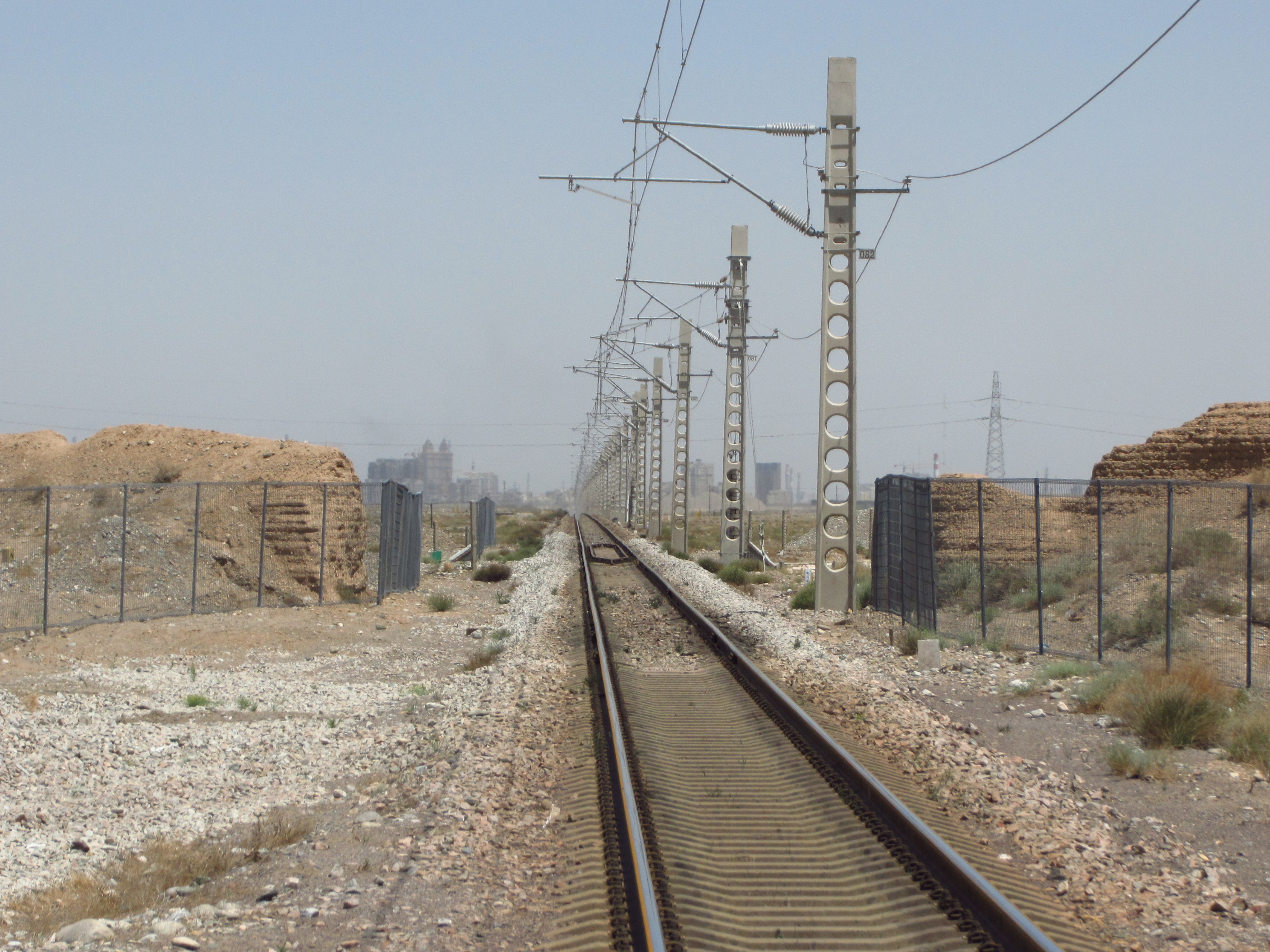
- View of the Jiajing Railway cutting through the 14th-century Great Wall of China in Jiayuguan City

Overview
- Other name(s): Jingtieshan Branch Line
- Native name: 嘉镜铁路
- Locale: Gansu, China
- Termini: Jiayuguan Railway Station; Jingtieshan Railway Station
- Stations: 6

History
- Opened: 1965

Technical
- Track length: 69 km (43 mi)
- Track gauge: 1,435 mm (4 ft 8 1/2 in)

The Jiajing Railway (Chinese: 嘉镜铁路, shortened form of Jiayuguan–Jingtieshan Railway; Chinese: 嘉峪关镜铁山铁路), officially the Jingtieshan Branch Line (Chinese: 镜铁山支线), is a 69 km (43 mi)-long branch line of the Lanxin Railway in Gansu Province, China. The railway line mostly runs through rural Sunan County and connects Jiayuguan City with the Jingtieshan iron mine in the Qilian Mountains south of Jiayuguan. The route follows the course of the Beida River (Chinese: 北大河) through the Qilian Mountains before reaching the Gobi Desert outside of Jiayuguan.

Construction on the Jiajing Railway began in 1958 and was completed in 1965. Construction of the line involved multiple tunnels and bridges to navigate through the mountains, and the line crosses the Beida a total of 8 times. Originally serving only the Jingtieshan mine operated by Jiuquan Iron and Steel Group Company, the line now also serves the Xigou mine via a short spur. In addition to the transport of goods, the railway serves as a passenger line primarily for mine workers from Jiayuguan.

== Stations ==
Station Number	Station	Location	Distance	Connections
1	Jiayuguan	Xiongguan Subdistrict, Jiayuguan City	0 km (0 mi)	Lanzhou–Xinjiang railway; Jiayuguan–Ceke railway
2	Chunfeng	Wenshu Town, Jiayuguan City	7 km (4.3 mi)	
3	Qiaoxi	Wenshu Town, Jiayuguan City	14 km (8.7 mi)	
4	Langweishan	Sunan Yugur Autonomous County, Zhangye City	49 km (30 mi)	
5	Dongshuixia	Jingtieshan Mining Area, Sunan Yugur Autonomous County, Zhangye City	65 km (40 mi)	
6	Jingtieshan	Jingtieshan Mining Area, Sunan Yugur Autonomous County, Zhangye City	69 km (43 mi)	
