= Ceke, Inner Mongolia =

Port of entry of China

Coordinates: 42°34′00″N 101°18′00″E

Ceke Port of Entry (Chinese: 策克口岸; pinyin: Cèkè kǒu'àn) is a port of entry on China's border with Mongolia. The only international border crossing within Alxa League of Inner Mongolia, Ceke is located in Ejin Banner, in the Gobi Desert. The locality on the opposite, (Outer) Mongolian, side of the border is called Shivee Khuren.

Ceke's importance is primarily due to its location on the road from China to the Nariin Sukhait mining complex (Ovoot Tolgoi) in Mongolia. The Chinese part of the road is known as Inner Mongolia Provincial Highway 315 (S315).

Presently, there is only a highway border crossing at Ceke, which has been upgraded to 8 lanes in January 2013.

There are three railway terminals at Ceke, at which coal trucked in from Outer Mongolia can be loaded on train and shipped out over the Jiayuguan–Ceke Railway, Ejin–Hami Railway or Linhe–Ceke Railway.

Plans exist for extending the railway from Ceke to the Nariin Sukhait coal fields in Mongolia itself, so that transshipment at Ceke will not be necessary anymore.
