= Luc Kwanten =

Belgian sinologist, Tangutologist and literary agent (1944–2021)

Luc Kwanten (Chinese: 吕光东; pinyin: Lü Guangdong) (8 January 1944 – 22 November 2021) was a Belgian sinologist, Tangutologist and literary agent.

== Biography ==
Kwanten was born in Berlin on 8 January 1944, during the Second World War, to a Jewish mother who secretly observed her faith under Nazi rule. Shortly after his birth, Kwanten's mother took him to live in Belgium, and he grew up in Brussels, receiving his education at a Jesuit school.

During the early 1960s Kwanten worked as a pilot in the Belgian Air Force, flying the Super Starfighter jet aircraft. However, after he was seriously injured in a crash during landing he transferred to the Belgian Intelligence Service. Whilst working for the intelligence service he also studied at Ghent University and the Sorbonne University in Paris. In 1968 he went to the United States to continue his studies. He studied for a PhD at the University of South Carolina, and completed his dissertation on "Tibetan-Mongol Relations during the Yuan Dynasty, 1207–1368" in 1972.

He taught at Ramapo College in New Jersey between 1972 and 1974, and was an associate professor for Chinese and Inner Asian History at the Department of Uralic and Altaic Studies of Indiana University from 1974 to 1978. He was subsequently appointed associate professor of Chinese and Central Asian History and Philology and Curator of the Far Eastern Library at the University of Chicago. During the late 1970s and early 1980s Kwanten published a number of articles on the extinct Tangut language, as well as a book-length study of the Chinese glosses in the 12th-century Chinese-Tangut glossary, Pearl in the Palm. He also raised the possibility that the Tangut language was not a Sino-Tibetan language as is generally thought, but may belong to the Altaic language family.

In the 1980s he moved to Taiwan, where he taught Chinese border history at the National Chengchi University in Taipei, and worked as the Belgian Foreign Trade Advisor.

In 1987 he and his Taiwanese wife, Lily Chen, opened a literary agency called "Big Apple Agency" in Taiwan. In 1991, he opened an office in Beijing, and by 2010 Big Apple had offices in Shanghai, Beijing, Taipei and Honolulu. The agency specializes in the publication of Chinese translations of English-language books, both fiction and non-fiction, including some bilingual Chinese and English editions. According to Forbes Asia, Big Apple is the largest literary agency in the People's Republic of China.

== Personal life ==
Kwanten and his wife, Lily Chen, were married in Taipei in 1985 and they had three children combined from previous marriages, the eldest of whom, Wendy King, runs the Honolulu office of Big Apple.

Kwanten died at his home in Shanghai on 22 November 2021.

== Works ==
- 1971. "Tibetan Names in the Yüan Imperial Family". Mongolia Society Bulletin 10-1: 64–66.
- 1974. "Chinggis-khan's Conquest of Tibet, Myth or Reality?"; Journal of Asian History vol. 8: 8–9.
- 1977. "Tangut Miscellanea I: On the Inventor of the Tangut script." Journal of the American Oriental Society 97: 333–335.
- 1977. "The analysis of the Tangut (Hsi Hsia) language: Sino-Tibetan or Altaic?". Public Lecture, Columbia University, February 2, 1977.
- 1978. "Chio-ssu-lo, 997-1065 : a Tibetan Ally of the Sung". Rocznik Orientalislycznv 39: 97–105.
- 1979. Imperial Nomads: A History of Central Asia, 500–1500. University of Pennsylvania Press. ISBN 9780812277500
- 1980. With Susan Hesse. Tangut (Hsi Hsia) Studies: A Bibliography. Indiana University Uralic and Altaic Series, vol. 137. Research Institute for Inner Asian Studies, Indiana University.
- 1982. The Timely Pearl: A 12th Century Tangut-Chinese Glossary (Volume I: The Chinese Glosses). Indiana University Uralic and Altaic Series vol. 142. Research Institute for Inner Asian Studies, Indiana University. (Reprinted 1997 by Taylor & Francis, ISBN 9780700709427)
- 1982. "The Lexicography of the Hsi Hsia (Tangut) Language". Cahiers de Linguistique Asie Orientale 11-2: 55–67.
- 1982. "Verbal agreement in Tangut: a conflicting opinion." Linguistics of the Tibeto-Burman Area 7-1:55–62.
- 1984. "Manchurica in the Far Eastern Library, University of Chicago". Zentralasiatische Studien 17: 181–183.
- 1984. "The Phonological Hypothesis of the Hsi Hsia (Tangut) Language". T'oung Pao 70: 159–184.
- 1984. Special Research Problems in Hsi Hsia History and Linguistics. National Chengchi University.
- 1988. "The Structure of the Tangut [Hsi Hsia] Characters". Ajia Afurika gengo bunka kenkyū (アジア・アつリカ言語文化研究) 36: 69–105.
