= Khara-Khoto =

Ruined city in Inner Mongolia, China

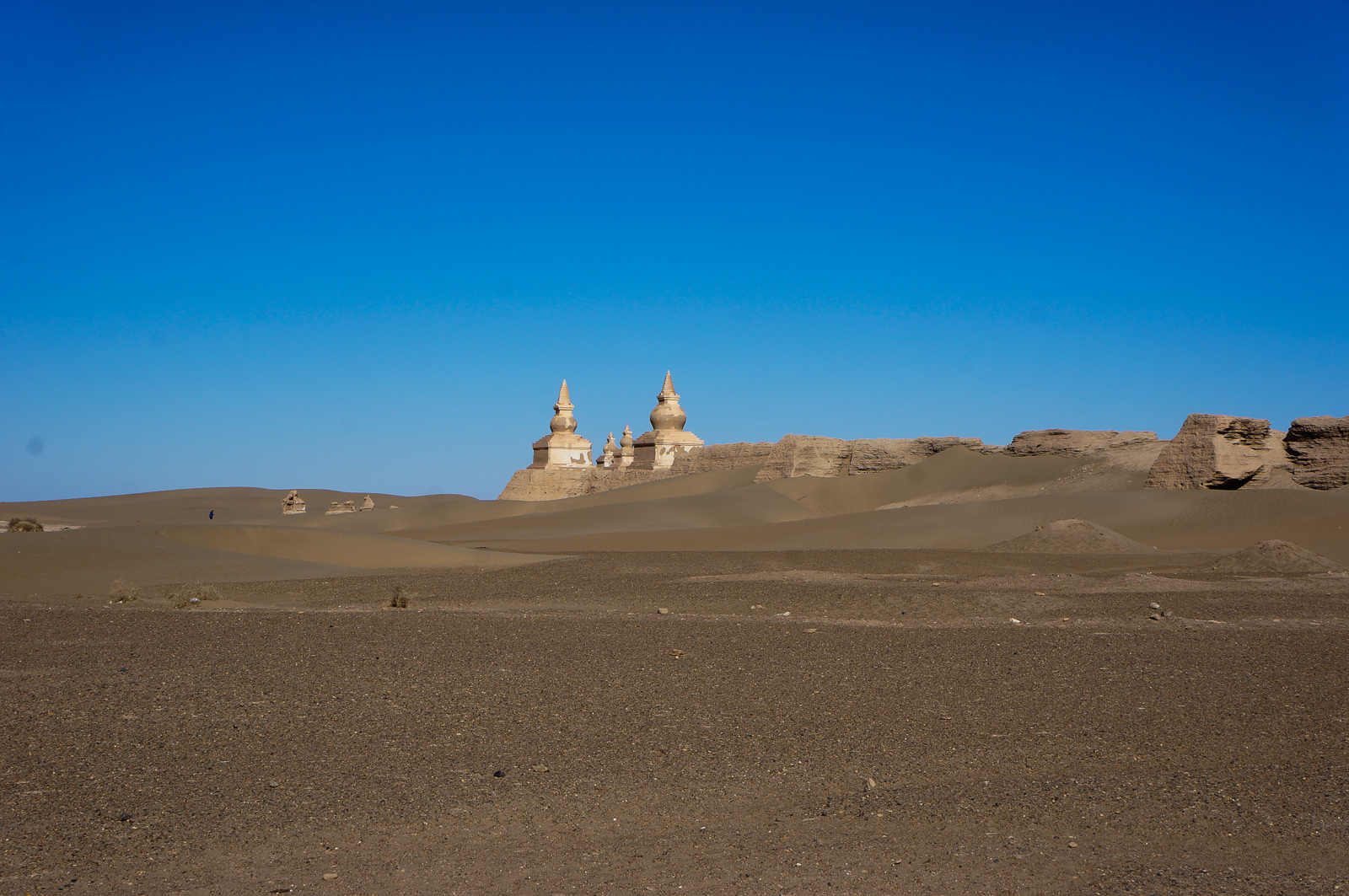
- The extant walls of Khara-Khoto

- Location of Khara-Khoto in Inner Mongolia Khara-Khoto (Inner Mongolia)
- 41.7650°N 101.1450°E
- Location: Inner Mongolia, China

Khara-Khoto, (Note: Chinese: 哈拉浩特 or 哈日浩特; Mongolian: Хар хот (Khar Khot); 'black city') also known as Heicheng, (Note: Chinese: 黑城) is an abandoned city near the Juyan Lake in the sum of Bayan Toroi, about 25 kilometres (16 mi) south of the seat of Ejin Banner in Alxa League at the western end of Inner Mongolia, China. Built in 1032, the city thrived under the rule of the Tangut-led Western Xia dynasty. It has been identified as the city of Etzina, which appears in The Travels of Marco Polo, and hence today's Ejin Banner is named after this city.

== Name ==
Khara-Khoto is known by many names, including its Tangut endonym (Tangut script: 𗋽𗰞, 'black water', reconstructed pronunciation: /*zjɨ̱r²-nja̱¹/, transcribed into Chinese as 亦集乃 Yijinai), Etzina through Marco Polo, modern Mongolian Хар хот (Khar khot, Middle Mongol language:ᠬᠠᠷ᠎ᠠ ᠬᠣᠲᠠ qara qota, 'black city') and to the Chinese as Heishuicheng or Heishui City (Chinese: 黑水城; pinyin: Hēishuǐchéng; lit. 'black water city'), commonly abbreviated as Heicheng (黑城; Hēichéng; 'black castle/city'). It is also written Qara-Qoto.

== History ==
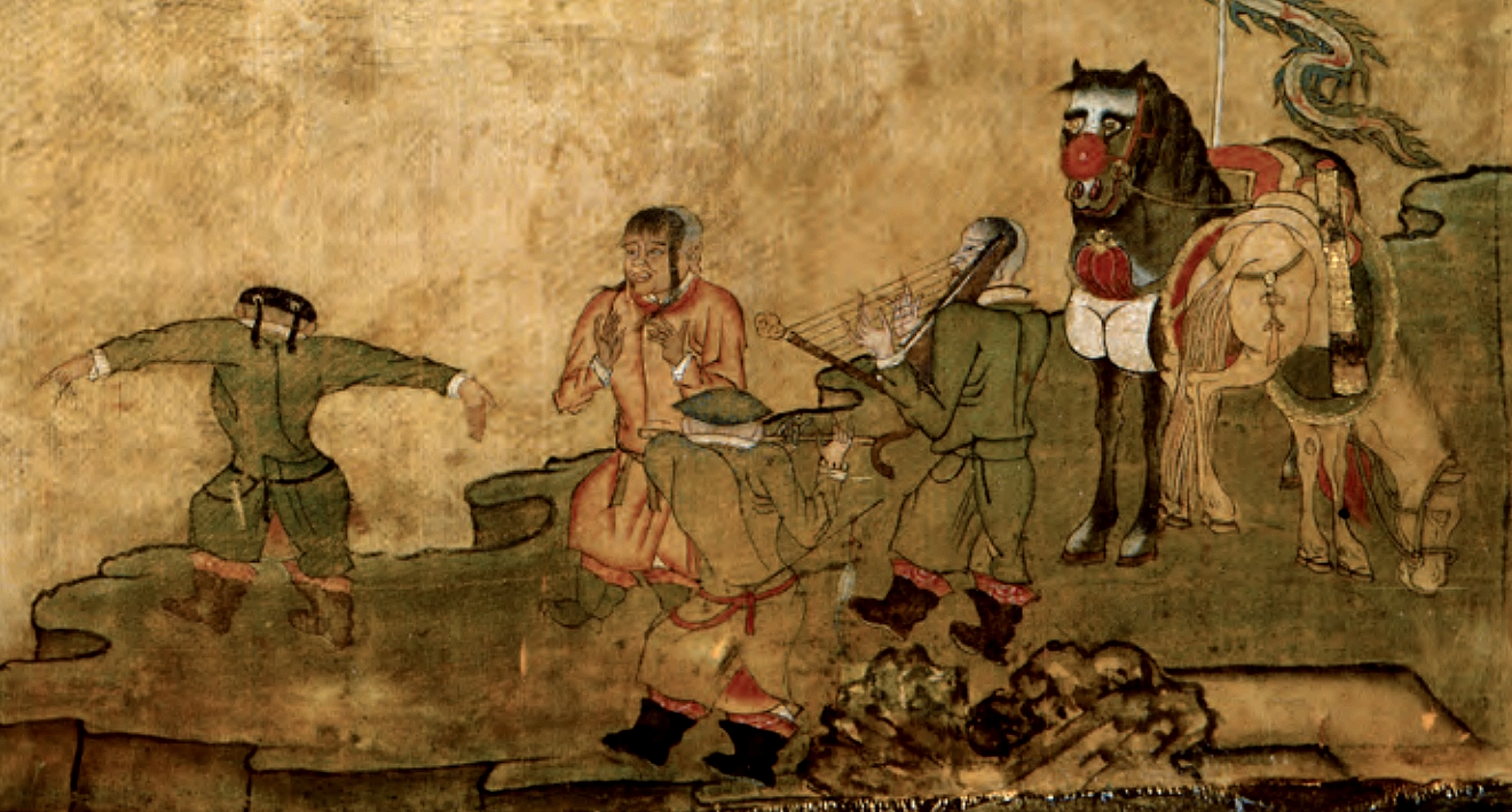
Moon-Water Bodhisattva Kuanyin, detail of entertainers. China, Tangut State of Xi-Xia, Khara-Khoto. 10-13th century. State Hermitage Museum

The city was founded in 1032 and became a thriving centre of Western Xia trade in the 11th century. There are remains of 30 ft (9.1 m)-high ramparts and 12 ft (3.7 m)-thick outer walls. The outer walls ran for some 421 m (1,381 ft) east-west by 374 m (1,227 ft) north-south.

The walled fortress was first taken by Genghis Khan in 1226, but—contrary to a widely circulated misunderstanding—the city continued to flourish under Mongol rule. During Kublai Khan's time, the city was expanded, reaching a size three times larger than during the Western Xia dynasty. The Northern Yuan dynasty under Toghon Temür concentrated its preparation for the reconquest of the Central Plain at Khara-Khoto. The city was located on the crossroads connecting Karakorum, Shangdu and Kumul.

In The Travels of Marco Polo, Marco Polo describes a visit to a city called Etzina or Edzina, which has been identified with Khara-Khoto.

When you leave the city of Campichu you ride for twelve days, and then reach a city called Etzina, which is towards the north on the verge of the Sandy Desert; it belongs to the Province of Tangut. The people are Idolaters, and possess plenty of camels and cattle, and the country produces a number of good falcons, both Sakers and Lanners. The inhabitants live by their cultivation and their cattle, for they have no trade. At this city you must needs lay in victuals for forty days, because when you quit Etzina, you enter on a desert which extends forty days' journey to the north, and on which you meet with no habitation nor baiting-place.

— Marco Polo, The Travels of Marco Polo, translated by Henry Yule, 1920

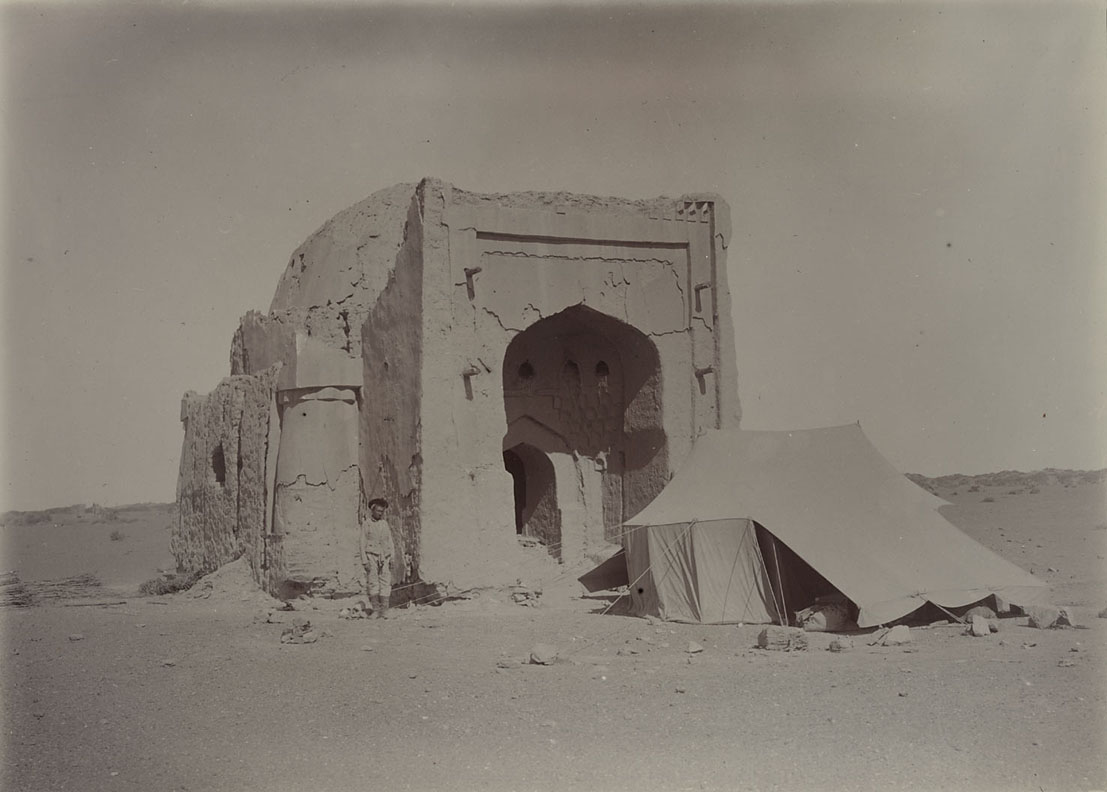
Image from Aurel Stein's visit. A tomb (possibly a mosque) at the southeast corner, viewed from the east.

According to a legend of the local Torghut population, in 1372 a Mongol military general named Khara Bator was surrounded with his troops by the armies of the Ming dynasty. Diverting the Ejin River, the city's water source that flowed just outside the fortress, the Ming dynasty denied Khara-Khoto water for its gardens and wells. As time passed and Khara Bator realised his fate, he murdered his family and then himself. After his suicide, Khara Bator's soldiers waited within the fortress until Ming troops finally attacked and killed the remaining inhabitants. Another version of the legend holds that Khara Bator made a breach in the northwestern corner of the city wall and escaped through it. The remains of the city have a breach through which a rider can pass.

The defeat of the Mongols at Khara-Khoto is described in the Ming dynasty annals: "In the fifth year of Hungu (1372), General Feng Sheng and his army reached Edzina. The town's defender Buyan'temur surrendered, and Chinese troops reached the mountains of Bojiashan. The ruler of Yuan, Gyardzhipan', fled. His minister... and 27 others were captured, together with ten or more thousand head of horses and cattle." After the defeat, and also possibly due to a water shortage, the city was abandoned and left in ruins. Its exceedingly remote location preserved it from looters.

== Exploration ==
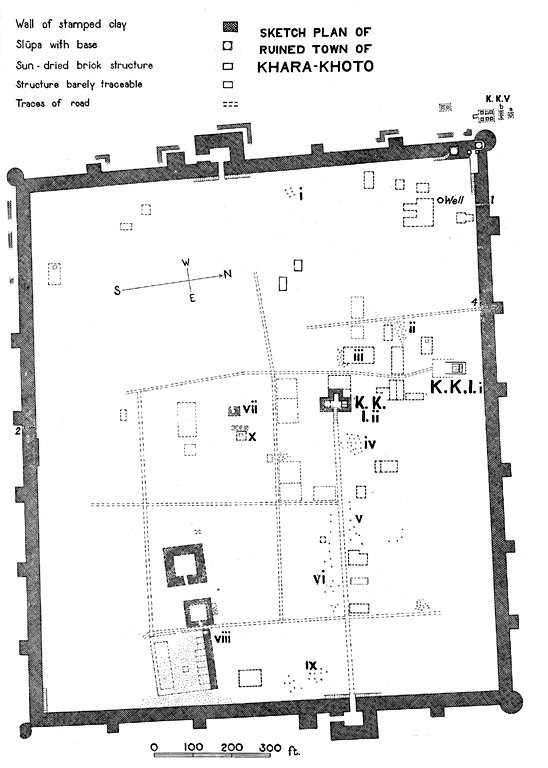
Plan of Khara-Khoto, Aurel Stein expedition

Russian explorers Grigory Potanin and Vladimir Obruchev heard rumours that somewhere downstream the Ejin River an ancient city was waiting. This knowledge gave impetus to the Asian Museum, St. Petersburg, to launch a new Mongol-Sichuan expedition under the command of Pyotr Kuzmich Kozlov.

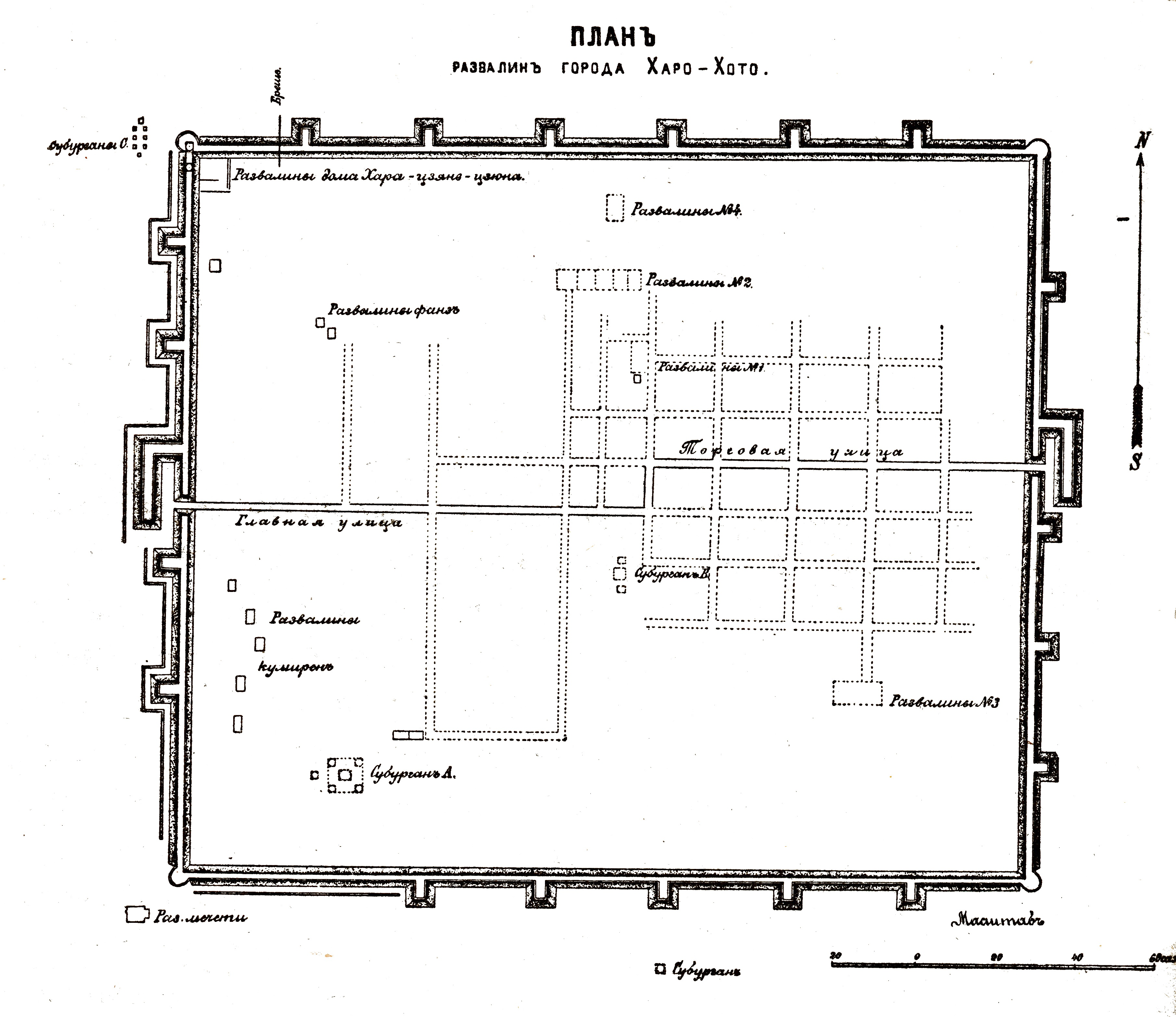
Kozlov expedition map of Khara-Khoto. The mosque is in the extreme bottom-left corner of the map just outside the city walls, indicated by a rectangular shape labeled with the words "Раз. мечети".

However, Khara-Khoto was earlier discovered by Buryat explorer Tsokto Badmazhapov in the spring of 1907. Badmazhapov sent photographs and a handwritten description of Khara-Khoto to the Geographical Society in St Petersburg. On May 1, 1908, during his 1907–1909 expedition to Central Asia, Kozlov arrived at Khara-Khoto and, with a dinner and gift of a gramophone to a local Torghut lord Dashi Beile, obtained permission to dig at the site. Over 2,000 books, scrolls and manuscripts in the Tangut language were uncovered. Kozlov initially sent ten chests of manuscripts and Buddhist objects to St. Petersburg, returning again in May 1909 for more objects. The books and woodcuts were found in June, while excavating a stupa outside city walls some 400 m (1,300 ft) westward.

Sir Aurel Stein excavated Khara-Khoto during his third Central Asian expedition from July 1913 to February 1916, surveying Khara-Khoto for eight days at the end of May 1914. The findings from this research was incorporated in chapter 13 of Stein's first volume of Innermost Asia.

Langdon Warner visited Khara-Khoto in 1925.

Folke Bergman first traveled to Khara-Khoto in 1927, returning in 1929 and staying for a year and a half in the area. He made maps of Khara-Khoto and the Ejin River area, surveyed watchtowers and fortresses, finding a large number of xylographs. Bergman noted that Kozlov's and Stein's visits were cursory and some of their published documentation was partially incorrect.

Sven Hedin and Xu Xusheng led the Sino-Swedish Expedition on archaeological excavations of the site between 1927–31. After Hedin, John DeFrancis visited in 1935.

Further Chinese excavations between 1983 and 1984 by Li Yiyou, Inner Mongolian Institute of Archaeology, have produced some 3,000 more manuscripts. In addition to books, these excavations unearthed building materials, daily items, production instruments and religious art.

== Findings ==
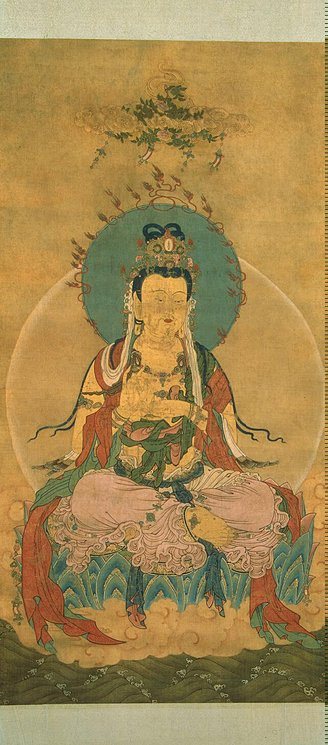
A silk painting from Khara-Khoto, now located in Hermitage Museum, St. Petersburg

Kozlov's findings, some 3,500 paintings and other objects, are in the Hermitage Museum, St. Petersburg, while the books and xylographs are at the Institute of Oriental Studies. These survived the Siege of Leningrad and some of them were even lost until their rediscovery in 1991, forming the basis for research of the Tangut language, written in Tangut script in subsequent years. The books and manuscripts sent back to St. Petersburg by Kozlov were studied by Aleksei Ivanovich Ivanov, who identified several Tangut dictionaries, including a Chinese-Tangut glossary titled Pearl in the Palm, compiled in 1190.

In addition to written artifacts, the Khara-Khoto collection in the Hermitage Museum includes paintings on silk, mainly of Buddhist subjects in Chinese and Tibetan styles. In addition, batik-dyed silk fragments have also been found. A small mud wall painting fragment confirms use of cobalt as a pigment in the form of smalt.

According to Hermitage curator Kira Samosyuk, "Most of the paintings in the collection date from the eleventh through thirteenth centuries, while the majority of the fragments of porcelain with cobalt decorative glazing are from the fourteenth century. No painting is of a later date than 1378–1387; no Chinese text – later than 1371; no Tangut text – later than 1212. So it seems that the life of the town ceased sometime around 1380."

One of the puzzles of Khara-Khoto is that there was one building just outside the castle walls. Judging by its shape, it seems to be a mosque. It seems there were Muslims among the people that were ruled by the Tangut. Due to the polytheistic belief of the local people, the Muslims built their mosques outside. Traders from India and the further west would have prayed in the mosque and found relief after their arduous journey along the Silk Road.

=== Khara-Khoto Christian manuscripts ===
East Syriac Christianity reached the Tangut area at least during the Tang dynasty (618–907), which was before the time of the Tangut Empire. The Church flourished under the Mongol rule, and a metropolitan province bearing the name of Tangut was created in the end of the 13th century. A large number of East Syriac Christian manuscripts were discovered in Khara-Khoto, among which, several were uncovered by Pyotr Kozlov during his Mongol-Sichuan expedition of 1907–1909; several were brought to light by Aurel Stein during his third Central Asian expedition in 1914; and about 3000 manuscripts were found by an Inner-Mongolian archaeological research team between 1983 and 1984. The languages used in these documents include Arabic, Mongolian, Persian, Sanskrit, Syriac, Tangut, Tibetan, Uyghur, Old Turkic and other Turkic languages. 228 of the 3000-odd manuscripts were studied by Japanese and Chinese researchers. One Syriac piece (H 101) was studied in detail by Shinichi Muto and given content analysis.

== See also ==
- Äriqaya (Egrigaia)
- List of cities with defensive walls
