= Juyan Lake =

Lake in Inner Mongolia, China

Coordinates: 42°17′N 100°37′E

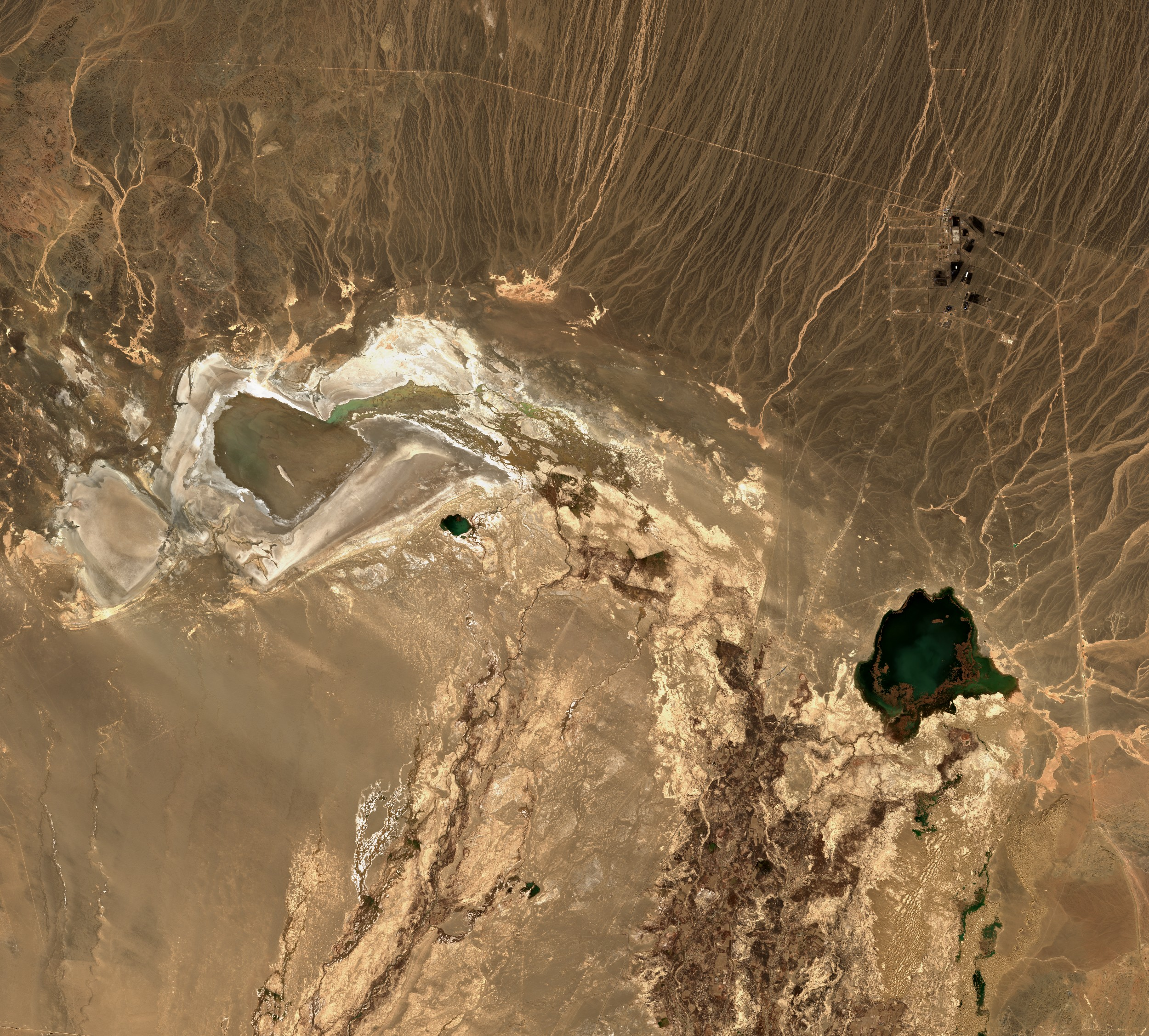
Sentinel-2 image (2018)

The Juyan Lake (Chinese: 居延海; Wade–Giles: Chüyen Hai, Mongolian: Sogo Nuur) is an endorheic lake in the Badain Jaran Desert. It is located in the western part of Inner Mongolia, in Ejin Banner of the Alxa League, near the border with Mongolia. It originally referred to two lakes, the western of which was called Gashuun Nuur in Mongolian (Chinese: 嘎顺淖尔 Gāshùn nào'ěr or 嘎顺诺尔 Gāshùn nuò'ěr). Through the process of desertification, Gashuun Nuur had an area of 267 km^{2} (103 sq mi) in 1958, 213 km^{2} (82 sq mi) in 1960, and dried up completely in 1961. The eastern lake followed in 1992, but reappeared in 2005. As of August 2012, the area of the lake is 38 km^{2} (15 sq mi).

The Juyan Lake Wetland is the inland delta of the Ejin River, also known as the Black River. It covers an area of about 10,000 square kilometres (3,900 sq mi). The Juyan Lake constitutes the only remaining of three former terminal lakes.

The wider region, having been called Juyan since ancient times, was a vital area of Chinese dynasties from the Han all the way to at least the Yuan.

== History ==
Juyan played an important role in ancient times and was used as a barrier of protection for the Hexi Corridor between the 2nd century BC to the 8th century AD.

"This territory, called Juyan by the Han Chinese, was maintained and garrisoned by the empire from the time of Emperor Wu until the last century of Later Han. Militarily, the outpost of the Great Wall was important for two reasons: as a supply point for the garrisons in the northwest and, perhaps more significant, as a means to deny this prosperous region to the northern nomads. Left undefended, Juyan would have provided an ideal route for attack against the Chinese commanderies of the corridor itself.

During Former Han, therefore, the Zhelu Zhang (Fortress to Block the Enemy), had been constructed by the marshes of the Edsin Gol, and it was from this base, for example, that the general Li Ling went forth on his disastrous attack against the Xiongnu in 99 BC.

South of the Juyan salient, the main line of defences followed the Great Wall, which ran in this region from the passes of Yumen Guan and Yang Guan in Dunhuang commandery of the far west along the northern edge of the Hexi Corridor past Jiuquan, Zhangye and Wuwei."

== Juyan Han wooden slips ==
In 1930, the Sino-Swedish Expedition excavated ten sites in the wetlands and unearthed a total of 10,200 wooden slips dating to the Western Han, which came to be known as the "old Juyan texts." In 1937, after the Second Sino-Japanese War began, Chung-Chang Shen transported these wooden slips from Beijing to the University of Hong Kong. Another 20,237 slips were excavated between 1972 and 1976 by the Juyan Archaeological Team, Gansu. These slips are held by the Provincial Museum of Gansu and came to be known as the "new Juyan texts."

== In fiction ==
The science fiction series Perry Rhodan features the rocket-shuttle Stardust returning from the Moon in 1971 with alien technology, landing near the point where the Ejin River (called Edsengol) flows into the Juyan Lake (called Goshunsee, i.e. Goshun Lake), not far from the real-life Jiuquan Satellite Launch Center. The area, in which Earth's later capital Terrania is built, remains a central location in the series.
