= Ejin River =

Ejin River Heihe, Heishui, Etsin-gol, Ruo He, Ruo Shui (额济纳河; 黑河; 弱水 (Chinese))
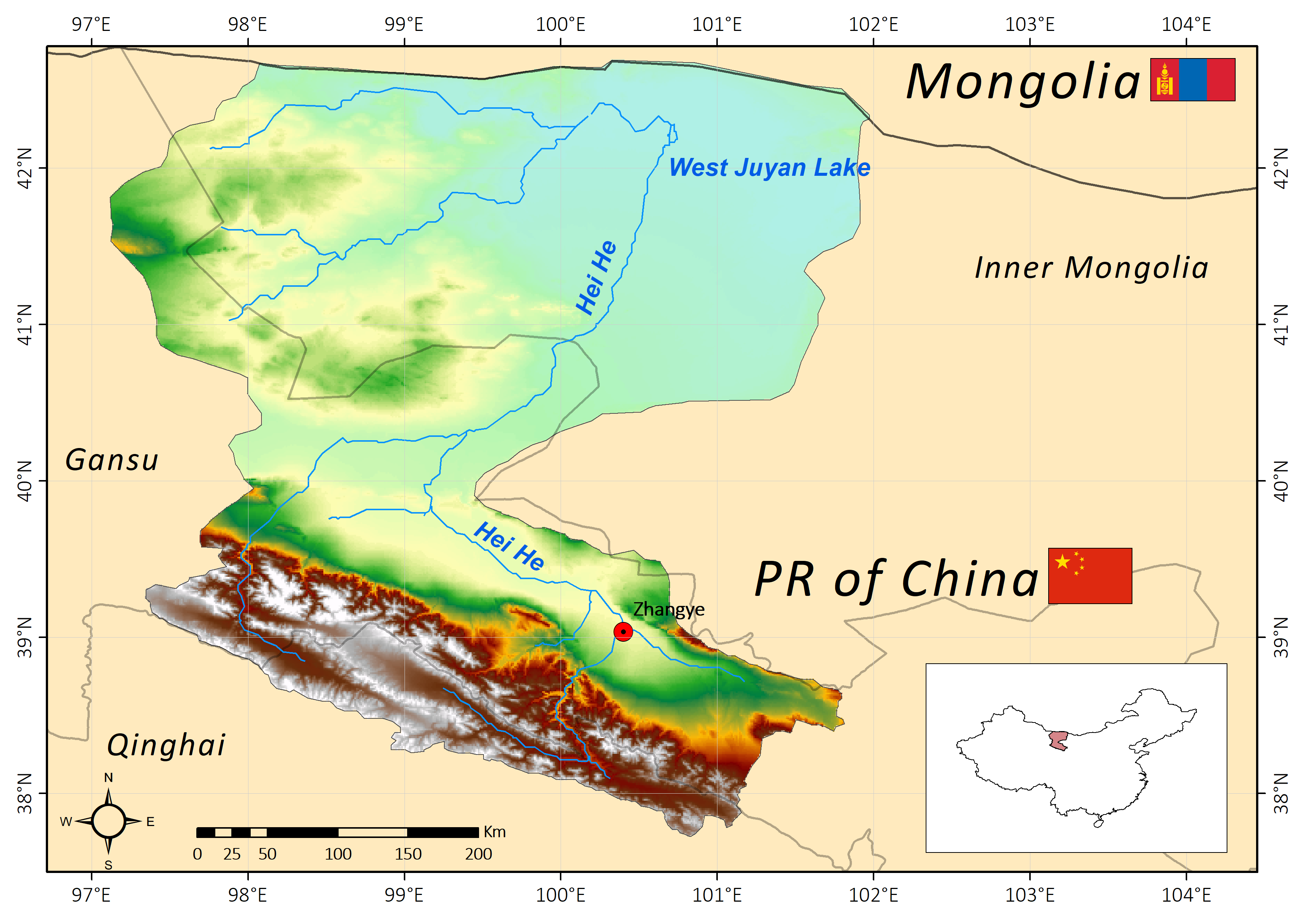
- Ejin river basin

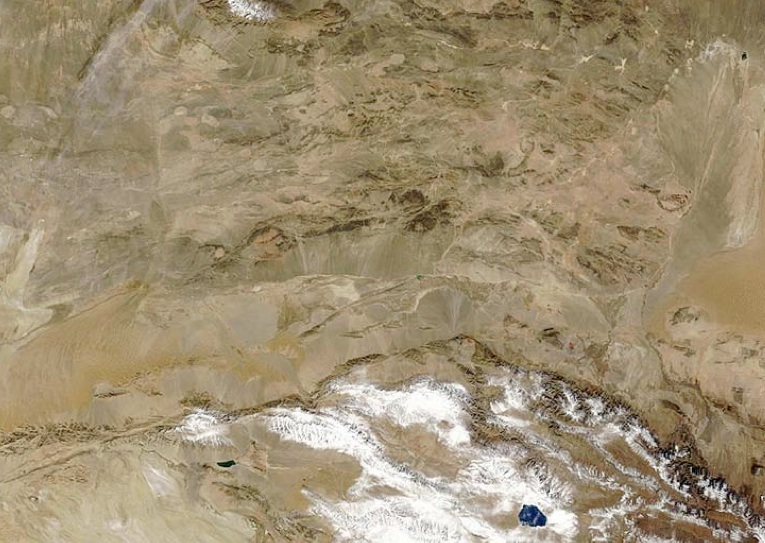
- Satellite view of the deserts of northern China. The middle and upper reaches of the Ejin river system are visible as the faint green trace as it is flowing upwards (north) along the right edge of the image.
- Etymology: Named for the seasonal flows in its lower course
- Native name: 额济纳河 (Chinese)

Location
- Country: China
- Subdivisions: Gansu, Inner Mongolia
- Cities: Zhangye, Jiuquan

Physical characteristics
- Source: Kan Chou and Hsü Chao springs
  - location: Qilian Shan, Gansu
  - coordinates: 38°00′04″N 100°54′45″E
  - elevation: 3,650 m (11,980 ft)
- Mouth: Badain Jaran Playa
  - location: Badain Jaran Desert, Inner Mongolia
  - coordinates: 42°18′50″N 101°04′20″E
  - elevation: 900 m (3,000 ft)
- Length: 630 km (390 mi)
- Basin size: 78,600 km^{2} (30,300 sq mi)approx.

Basin features
- Tributaries
  - left: Dang He, Beida He

The Ejin River (Note: Chinese: 额济纳河) is a major closed basin river system of northern China. It flows approximately 630 kilometres (390 mi) from its headwaters in the Qilian Mountains north-northeast into the Juyan Lake in the Badain Jaran Desert. The river forms one of the largest inland deltas and alluvial fans in the world.

Its drainage basin covers about 78,600 square kilometres (30,300 mi^{2}) in parts of the Chinese subdivisions of Qinghai, Gansu, and Inner Mongolia. It is bounded by the Mazong Shan in the west, the Heli Shan and Longshou Shan in the south, the Helan Mountains and Lang Shan ranges in the east, and the Gobi Altay in the north.

== Naming ==
The Chinese name of the river is a transcription of its Tangut designation (Tangut: 𗋽𗰞, lit. 'black water', contemporary phonetic transcription with Chinese characters 亦集乃, (Note: Note that today's Pinyin of these differs from their pronunciation at the time.) now: 额济纳). Upstream, it is called Heihe or Hei River (Chinese: 黑河; lit. 'black river'), (Note: It is also called 黑水, or 'black water'.) mirroring the Tangut name, when it flows across Jiuquan, it is called Ruo Shui (Chinese: 弱水; lit. 'weak water/river'); reaching Alxa League, it assumes the name of Ejin River. It is also being referred to as Etsin Gol, or Ruo He in ancient times.

== History ==
About 2,000 years ago, the river was said to have a much more abundant flow than it does today and thus its perennial reaches stretched much farther out into the desert than it does today. Parts of the river flow through the Hexi Corridor, a valley which once formed a significant portion of the Silk Road. The upper section of the river was first settled by the Chinese in about 100 B.C. Many outposts were created to protect Silk Road traders from the frequent attacks of barbarians, as the water-abundant valley of the river in relation with the aridity of the surrounding terrain provided an easy route for Huns and Mongols to launch raids. Since then, the river valley has been intensely cultivated and logged. However, clearing of the landscape has caused increased erosion, leading to desertification of the region and a gradual reduction of the river flow.

The lower part of the river was once confused to be the middle reach of the Yellow River, which lies farther east but flows for a significant distance in the same direction paralleling the Ruo River.

The former Tangut city of Khara-Khoto, now deserted, lies near the lower end of the river. According to legend, the city was abandoned after Ming forces diverted the river away from the city in 1372. There are many more historic sites in the vicinity, such as Wenduge city, Lücheng ruins, and the Jiaquhouguan site.

European explorers that visited the area include Pyotr Kuzmich Kozlov (1907–1909) and John DeFrancis (1935).

In the 20th century, China's main spaceport, the Jiuquan Satellite Launch Center was constructed in the lower course of the Ruo Shui, with launch pads on both sides of the river.

== Basin characterization ==
The basin subdivision reflects the different hydrological dynamics typical of the numerous natural contexts to be found within the basin. Most of the population is found in the midstream area, together with the oases and the agricultural consortia.

	Upstream area	Midstream area	Downstream area
Area	27,376 km^{2} (10,570 sq mi)	25,391 km^{2} (9,804 sq mi)	99,839 km^{2} (38,548 sq mi)
Population (2015)	3,169,747	23,869,741	4,053,878

=== Upstream area ===
The main course of the river starts in the Qilian mountains at an elevation of 3650 m asl. The loamy sediment load gives the waters a dark colour which, during time, has contributed to the river being described as Hei (黑), that is Black. The orography in this part is obviously quite steep, with elevation peaks up to 5544 m asl and vegetation mainly made up of wild shrubs. Most of the precipitation fallen annually over the basin is concentrated in this area, creating two main river courses that join just north of the hydrometric station of Yingluo.

=== Midstream area ===
The midstream area is characterized by the presence of wide ranges of cultivated fields, mainly in the oases that follow the principal route of the river. The city of Zhangye, main centre of the region, is located next to a wide north-west bend of the river. The high population (940 in/km^{2} in 2015) and croplands density implies a high water demand, estimated at 2,400,000 m^{3} (85,000,000 cu ft)/year in the 2001–2012 time frame. This demand is mainly satisfied using the river (71%) and groundwater (29%). Notwithstanding the water influx from the rivers descending from the north-west side of the Qilian mountains, the total balance of the river in this part is negative (that is more water is lost than acquired).

=== Downstream area ===
After the stream gauge at Zhengyi, the river describes a wide north-east turn, developing its last 400 km in the western fringe of the Badain Jaran Desert. Apart from the physiological riparian vegetation, this last part of the hydrological basin is mainly desertic, and the water losses caused by both evaporation and deep percolation cause the water flux to weaken. This pattern has caused the river to be named Ruo (弱, Weak). After the Langxinshan stream gauge, the river splits into two entities: the Dong He (東河, Eastern river) and the Xi He (西河, Western river) that follow on in the desert for another 220 km before emptying into two terminal lakes, the Sogo Nur and the Gaxun Nur, respectively, collectively forming the Juyan Lake Basin. The delta is made of the alluvial fan of the river itself, crossed by hundreds of dry channels entrenched by the river during its frequent course changes. Because the climate of the area has followed a drying trend over the past 10,000 years or so, the delta is no longer considered active (i.e. deposits are not being built up significantly) and is slowly being eroded by wind and water action.

=== Hydrological balance components ===
The analysis of the different components of the hydrological balance in the three main areas of the basin allows to distinguish the different geoclimatic mechanisms at work.

Data about the 2001–2012 period [km^{3}/year]	Upstream area	Midstream area	Downstream area
Precipitation (rain and snow) P	8.66	2.48	4.53
Superficial inflow R_{in}	---	2.59	1.10
Subsurface inflow G_{in}	---	0.24	0.09
Evapotranspiration ET	5.54	4.28	5.69
Superficial outflow R_{out}	3.04	1.10	---
Subsurface outflow G_{out}-	0.04	0.04	---
Variation of the water content of the sub-basin ΔW	+0.08	−0.11	+0.03

The hydrological balance, in its most complete version and formulate for a generic sub-basin, is structured as follows: $\Delta W = P + R_{in} + G_{in} - ET - R_{out} - G_{out}$.

Most of the precipitation is found in the upstream area, also showing a positive correlation with elevation. The evapotranspiration volumes are almost the same notwithstanding the high area difference among the three areas because of the consistent vegetation presence in the upstream (wild shrubs) and midstream (croplands) areas. In the $ET$ term, when shifting from the vegetated (upstream and midstream) to the arid (downstream) areas, the transpiration element decreases in importance in favour of the simple evaporation. The volumetric balances, instead, show different signs: in the mountain area the input-over-output excess can be explained with the important precipitation volumes; in the midstream area the cultivations require a great amount of water that is extracted from the aquifers, increasing the water deficit; finally, in the downstream area the positive effects of the water replenishment programme of the Chinese government are visible in the increase of the stored water volume in the 2001–2012 period.

=== Hydrometry ===
Along the river course a series of stream gauges are located. For each, the following table states position and average of the (yearly cumulated) discharge.

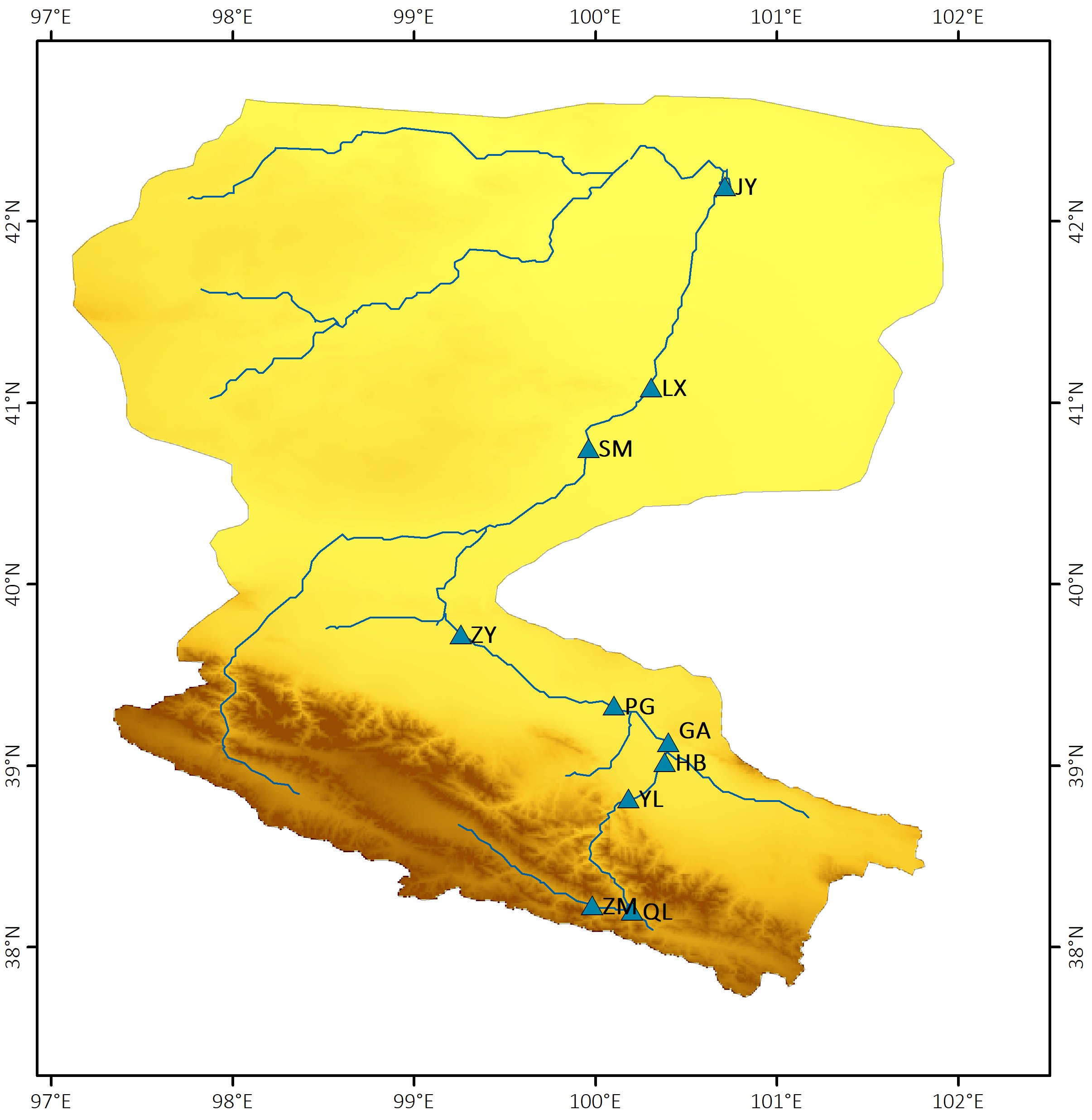
Map of the stream gauges along the HeiHe

Station	Code	Lon [°E]	Lat [°N]	Volume [hm³/year]	Temporal series	Area
Qilian	QL	100.23	38.20	457	1968–2010	Upstream
Zhamashenke	ZM	99.98	38.23	716	1957–2010	Upstream
Yingluoxia	YL	100.18	38.82	1584	1945–2012	limit
HeiHe Bridge	HB	100.38	39.02	n/a	n/a	Midstream
Gao'ai	GA	100.40	39.13	1034	1977–2010	Midstream
Pingchuan	PC	100.10	39.99	n/a	n/a	Midstream
Zhengyixia	ZY	99.42	39.79	1017	1957–2012	limit
Shaomaying	SM	99.96	40.75	n/a	n/a	Downstream
Langxinshan	LX	100.36	41.08	n/a	n/a	Downstream
Juyan Lake	JY	101.11	42.21	n/a	n/a	Downstream

Following the available discharge data, a flow increase is present in the upstream area (up until Yingluoxia), followed by gradually decreasing values in the midstream area. This flow weakening is the result of the net balance between the tributaries descending from the north-east side of the Qilian Shan and the considerable derivations related to the cropfield area.

== See also ==
- List of rivers of China
- Shule River
- Tarim River
- Weak River (mythology)
