= Nariin Sukhait mining complex =

Mine in Gurvan tes, Ömnögovi, Mongolia

Nariin Sukhait / Ovoot Tolgoi
- Location within Mongolia
- Location: Gurvan tes sum, Ömnögovi, Mongolia; 43°00′08″N 101°15′38″E
- Products: Steam coal
- Company: Mongolyn Alt Corporation (MAK)

The Nariin Sukhait or Ovoot Tolgoi mining complex (Mongolian: Нарийн Сухайт / Овоот Толгой) is located in the Gurvan tes District, Ömnögovi Province, Mongolia. The site is 25 km SE from sum center and 56 km north of Shivee Khüren - Ceke crossing point on the Mongolian-Chinese border.

Three companies operate at Nariin Sukhait Mine as independent coal producers, namely, Mongolyn Alt Corporation LLC, Mongolia; and Mongolian-Chinese JV "Qinhua-MAK-Nariin Sukhait" LLC; as well as SouthGobi Resources Ltd., through its local subsidiary SouthGobi Sands LLC.

Nariin Sukhait is reported to hold about 380 million mt of resources of high-rank, low-ash, low-sulphur metallurgical and steam coal, of which 220 million mt of resources belong to the licenses of Mongolyn Alt Corporation LLC and 160 million mt of coal is delineated under the licenses of SouthGobi Sands LLC.

In 2008 the mine produced and sold about 1.9 million mt of coal in total (2005 - 1.7 million mt) of which Mongolian-Chinese JV "Qinhua-MAK-Nariin Sukhait" LLC exported 1.2 million mt; Mongolyn Alt Corporation LLC marketed 0.635 million mt; and SouthGobi Sands LLC. sold 0.113 million mt.

In accordance with the Special Permit for the construction of railway from the Nariin Sukhait mine to the Mongolian-Chinese border granted to Mongolyn Alt Corporation LLC, the construction of the 47.8-km railway from the mine to the presently existing railhead at Ceke is scheduled to start up in early 2010.

Nariin Sukhait is a strategic coal deposit plays a key role in Mongolia's mineral wealth redistribution efforts.
