= Ejin Banner =

Ejin Banner 额济纳旗 • ᠡᠵᠡᠨ᠎ᠡ ᠬᠣᠰᠢᠭᠤ
- Banner
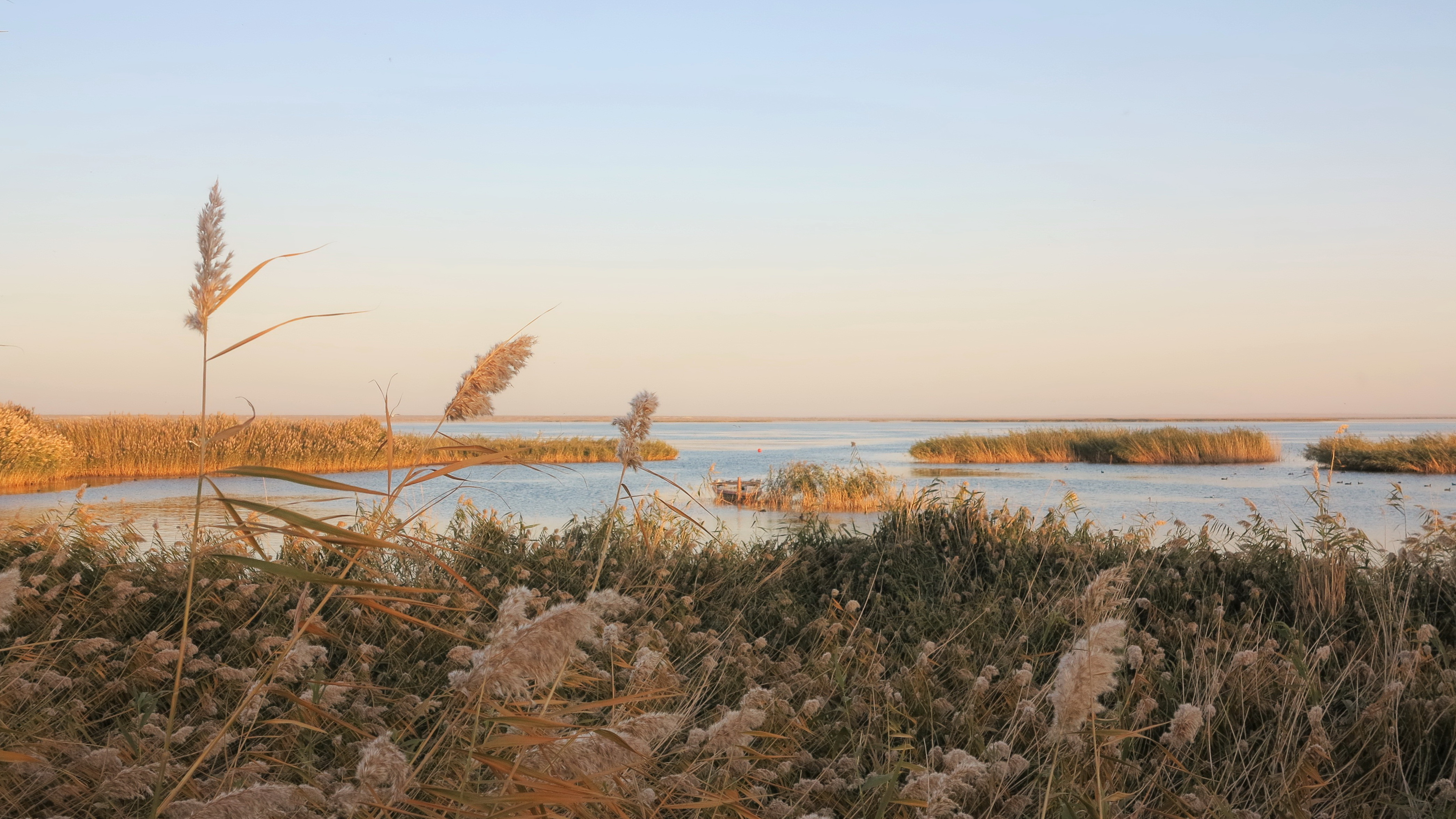
- Juyan Lake Wetland Park

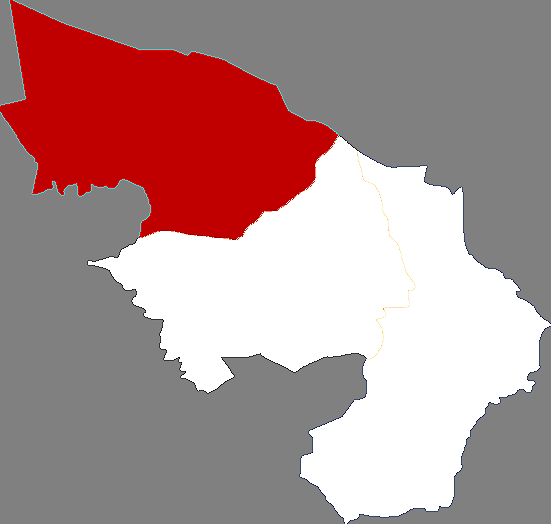
- Location in Alxa

- Location of the seat in Inner Mongolia Ejin (China)
- Coordinates: 41.7456°N 100.318°E
- Country: China
- Autonomous region: Inner Mongolia
- League: Alxa
- Banner seat: Dalaihob

Area
  - Total: 114,606 km^{2} (44,250 sq mi)

Population (2020)
  - Total: 35,756
  - Density: 0.31199/km^{2} (0.80805/sq mi)
- Time zone: UTC+8 (China Standard)
- Area code: 0483
- Website: www.ejnq.gov.cn

Ejin Banner

Chinese name
- Simplified Chinese: 额济纳旗
- Traditional Chinese: 額濟納旗
Transcriptions
Standard Mandarin
- Hanyu Pinyin: Éjǐnà Qí

Mongolian name
- Mongolian Cyrillic: Эзнээ хошуу
- Mongolian script: ᠡᠵᠡᠨ᠎ᠡ ᠬᠣᠰᠢᠭᠤ
Transcriptions
- SASM/GNC: Ejen-e qosiɣu

Ejin (Mongolian: ᠡᠵᠡᠨ᠎ᠡ ᠬᠣᠰᠢᠭᠤ; Chinese: 额济纳旗) is a banner in the far west of Inner Mongolia, China. It is under the administration of Alxa League and is the westernmost county-level division of Inner Mongolia, bordering Gansu province to the west and Mongolia's Bayankhongor and Govi-Altai Provinces. Its seat is located at Dalaihob Town. To the west, it shares a border with Subei Mongol Autonomous County of Jiuquan, Gansu.

== Demographics ==
The proportion of nationalities in Ejin Banner (2020)
Nationality	Percentage
Han	81.1%
Mongols	16.6%
Hui People	0.8%
Manchus	0.5%
Tibetans	0.3%
Tujia	0.1%
Miao (Hmong)	0.1%
Tu People	0.1%
Others	0.4%
Source of the population statistics :

== History ==
Ejin Torghut Banner during the Qing dynasty

The area was historically the hunting grounds of the Xiongnu, before being acquired by the Han dynasty in BC 121. The ruins of the ancient city of Khara-Khoto, founded by the Western Xia, are located in Ejin.

Ejin was incorporated into the Mongol Empire under Genghis Khan in 1226. During the Yuan dynasty, the area was home to nomadic Mongol populations. It was later incorporated into the Qing dynasty (1644–1912). Under the Republic of China, the area was under the jurisdiction of Ningxia province. The area fell under the control of the Communist Party in September 1949. Subsequently, it was placed successively under government commissions in Jiuquan, Zhangye, and Ningxia province.

On June 1, 1956, Ejin became part of the Bayannur League of the Inner Mongolia Autonomous Region. The Jiuquan Satellite Launch Center was constructed at around the same time. On May 1, 1980, it became part of the Alxa League. Since the Chinese economic reforms in the 1980s, Ejin rapidly developed its economy. By the early 21st century it became one of the fastest-growing counties in the country measured by GDP.

== Geography ==
Ejin Banner is the westernmost banner of Inner Mongolia. It is located in the Gobi Desert and borders Mongolia in the north, Gansu Province in the southwest, and Alxa Right Banner in the southeast.

Ejin Banner is geographically vast—approximately the size of South Korea, it covers an area larger than each of the provinces of Jiangsu and Zhejiang.

Ejin Banner takes its name from the Ejin River, also known as the Ruo Shui, which flows from the Qilian Mountains of Gansu, and whose two distributaries terminate in Juyan Lake basin within Ejin Banner. Most of the banner's population resides in this river's valley.

== Climate ==
Climate data for Ejin Banner, elevation 939 m (3,081 ft), (1991–2020 normals, extremes 1991–present)
Month	Jan	Feb	Mar	Apr	May	Jun	Jul	Aug	Sep	Oct	Nov	Dec	Year
Record high °C (°F)	9.6 (49.3)	17.3 (63.1)	25.0 (77.0)	34.9 (94.8)	38.2 (100.8)	41.2 (106.2)	43.7 (110.7)	41.3 (106.3)	38.9 (102.0)	31.0 (87.8)	19.8 (67.6)	9.8 (49.6)	43.7 (110.7)
Mean daily maximum °C (°F)	−3.2 (26.2)	3.2 (37.8)	11.5 (52.7)	20.6 (69.1)	27.2 (81.0)	32.8 (91.0)	35.1 (95.2)	32.8 (91.0)	26.5 (79.7)	17.4 (63.3)	6.8 (44.2)	−2.0 (28.4)	17.4 (63.3)
Daily mean °C (°F)	−10.4 (13.3)	−4.5 (23.9)	3.7 (38.7)	12.8 (55.0)	19.7 (67.5)	25.6 (78.1)	28.0 (82.4)	25.5 (77.9)	18.6 (65.5)	9.2 (48.6)	−0.5 (31.1)	−8.7 (16.3)	9.9 (49.9)
Mean daily minimum °C (°F)	−16.3 (2.7)	−11.2 (11.8)	−3.1 (26.4)	5.3 (41.5)	11.7 (53.1)	17.8 (64.0)	20.7 (69.3)	18.4 (65.1)	11.6 (52.9)	2.7 (36.9)	−6.2 (20.8)	−14.2 (6.4)	3.1 (37.6)
Record low °C (°F)	−29.1 (−20.4)	−27.0 (−16.6)	−17.5 (0.5)	−9.5 (14.9)	−3.1 (26.4)	8.3 (46.9)	11.7 (53.1)	7.3 (45.1)	−2.5 (27.5)	−11.3 (11.7)	−21.6 (−6.9)	−32.6 (−26.7)	−32.6 (−26.7)
Average precipitation mm (inches)	0.4 (0.02)	0.2 (0.01)	1.8 (0.07)	2.2 (0.09)	2.1 (0.08)	4.9 (0.19)	9.1 (0.36)	9.6 (0.38)	5.3 (0.21)	3.3 (0.13)	0.3 (0.01)	0.4 (0.02)	39.6 (1.57)
Average precipitation days (≥ 0.1 mm)	0.6	0.3	1.0	0.9	1.5	2.5	4.9	3.7	2.0	0.9	0.5	0.9	19.7
Average snowy days	1.5	0.7	0.9	0.1	0	0	0	0	0	0.2	0.9	1.6	5.9
Average relative humidity (%)	48	34	26	21	20	25	31	32	31	33	40	48	32
Mean monthly sunshine hours	223.7	227.5	268.5	293.0	328.8	323.8	323.2	310.4	295.5	280.0	225.1	213.4	3,312.9
Percentage possible sunshine	75	75	72	72	73	71	71	74	80	83	78	76	75
Source: China Meteorological Administration

Climate data for Guaizihu, Ejin Banner, elevation 960 m (3,150 ft), (1991–2020 normals)
Month	Jan	Feb	Mar	Apr	May	Jun	Jul	Aug	Sep	Oct	Nov	Dec	Year
Mean daily maximum °C (°F)	−3.4 (25.9)	2.9 (37.2)	11.3 (52.3)	20.6 (69.1)	27.4 (81.3)	32.9 (91.2)	35.3 (95.5)	33.0 (91.4)	26.6 (79.9)	17.4 (63.3)	6.9 (44.4)	−2.0 (28.4)	17.4 (63.3)
Daily mean °C (°F)	−10.7 (12.7)	−5.0 (23.0)	3.3 (37.9)	12.8 (55.0)	20.0 (68.0)	26.0 (78.8)	28.4 (83.1)	26.0 (78.8)	19.0 (66.2)	9.5 (49.1)	−0.3 (31.5)	−8.7 (16.3)	10.0 (50.0)
Mean daily minimum °C (°F)	−16.4 (2.5)	−11.5 (11.3)	−3.8 (25.2)	5.3 (41.5)	12.1 (53.8)	18.2 (64.8)	21.1 (70.0)	18.8 (65.8)	12.2 (54.0)	3.0 (37.4)	−5.9 (21.4)	−14.1 (6.6)	3.3 (37.9)
Average precipitation mm (inches)	0.6 (0.02)	0.5 (0.02)	1.6 (0.06)	2.5 (0.10)	3.1 (0.12)	6.7 (0.26)	13.3 (0.52)	11.6 (0.46)	7.7 (0.30)	2.3 (0.09)	0.6 (0.02)	0.6 (0.02)	51.1 (1.99)
Average precipitation days (≥ 0.1 mm)	0.7	0.5	0.8	1.0	1.4	2.5	4.1	3.2	2.6	1.0	0.4	0.8	19
Average snowy days	1.4	0.9	0.9	0.1	0	0	0	0	0	0.2	0.9	1.5	5.9
Average relative humidity (%)	49	35	26	19	19	23	30	31	30	30	39	49	32
Mean monthly sunshine hours	231.6	232.0	271.8	295.0	330.5	327.2	324.6	313.6	291.8	283.7	236.4	224.6	3,362.8
Percentage possible sunshine	78	77	73	73	73	72	71	74	79	84	81	79	76
Source: China Meteorological Administration

== Administrative divisions ==
Ejin Banner is divided into 2 subdistricts, 4 towns and 6 sums.

Name	Simplified Chinese	Hanyu Pinyin	Mongolian (Hudum Script)	Mongolian (Cyrillic)	Administrative division code
Subdistricts
Hangkong Subdistrict	航空街道	Hángkōng Jiēdào	ᠠᠭᠠᠷ ᠤᠨ ᠠᠶᠠᠯᠠᠯ ᠵᠡᠭᠡᠯᠢ ᠭᠤᠳᠤᠮᠵᠢ	Агаарын аялал зээл гудамж	152923001
Dongfeng Subdistrict	东风街道	Dōngfēng Jiēdào	ᠳ᠋ᠦᠩ ᠹᠧᠩ ᠵᠡᠭᠡᠯᠢ ᠭᠤᠳᠤᠮᠵᠢ	Дүн фен зээл гудамж	152923002
Towns
Dalai Hob Town	达来呼布镇	Dáláihūbù Zhèn	ᠳᠠᠯᠠᠢᠬᠥ᠋ᠪ ᠪᠠᠯᠭᠠᠰᠤ	Далайн-хөв балгас	152923100
Dongfeng Town	东风镇	Dōngfēng Zhèn	ᠳ᠋ᠦᠩ ᠹᠧᠩ ᠪᠠᠯᠭᠠᠰᠤ	Дүн фен балгас	152923101
Har Burgdin Ul Town	哈日布日格德音乌拉镇	Hārìbùrìgédéyīnwūlā Zhèn	ᠬᠠᠷ᠎ᠠ ᠪᠦᠷᠭᠦᠳ ᠦᠨ ᠠᠭᠤᠯᠠ ᠪᠠᠯᠭᠠᠰᠤ	Хар бүргэдийн уул балгас	152923102
Ceke Town	策克镇	Cèkè Zhèn	ᠴᠡᠺᠡ ᠪᠠᠯᠭᠠᠰᠤ	Цээ балгас	152923103
Sums
Saihan Toroi Sum	赛汉陶来苏木	Sàihàntáolái Sūmù	ᠰᠠᠢᠬᠠᠨᠲᠣᠣᠷᠠᠢ ᠰᠤᠮᠤ	Сайхантуурай сум	152923200
Mazongshan Sum	马鬃山苏木	Mǎzōngshān Sūmù	ᠮᠠᠽᠦ᠋ᠩᠱᠠᠨ ᠰᠤᠮᠤ	Мазуншан сум	152923201
Sub Nur Sum	苏泊淖尔苏木	Sūbónào'ěr Sūmù	ᠰᠤᠪᠨᠠᠭᠤᠷ ᠰᠤᠮᠤ	Сувнуур сум	152923202
Bayan Toroi Sum	巴彦陶来苏木	Bāyàntáolái Sūmù	ᠪᠠᠶᠠᠨᠲᠣᠣᠷᠠᠢ ᠰᠤᠮᠤ	Баянтоорой сум	152923203
Ungt Gol Sum	温图高勒苏木	Wēntúgāolè Sūmù	ᠦᠩᠲᠦᠭᠣᠣᠯ ᠰᠤᠮᠤ	Өнд-гол сум	152923204
Bayan Tohoi Sum	巴音陶海苏木	Bāyīntáohǎi Sūmù	ᠪᠠᠶᠠᠨᠲᠣᠬᠣᠢ ᠰᠤᠮᠤ	Баянтохой сум	152923205

== Transportation ==
Ejin Banner is served by the Ejin Banner Taolai Airport.

Train transportation is provided by Jiayuguan–Ceke and the Linhe–Ceke railways, which are primarily used to haul coal that has been trucked from Nariin Sukhait mining complex in Mongolia to Ceke and is loaded on trains at the coal terminals there. Passenger service exists on this railway; as of 2015 there is daily passenger service between Ejin and the regional capital Hohhot, which takes approximately 16 hours.

There is also a railway south to both sites (northern and southern) of Jiuquan Satellite Launch Center, which are also located within Ejin Banner.

== See also ==
- Khara-Khoto
- Jiuquan Satellite Launch Center
- Juyan Lake Basin
