= Wushaoling Tunnel =

Railway tunnel in Gansu, China

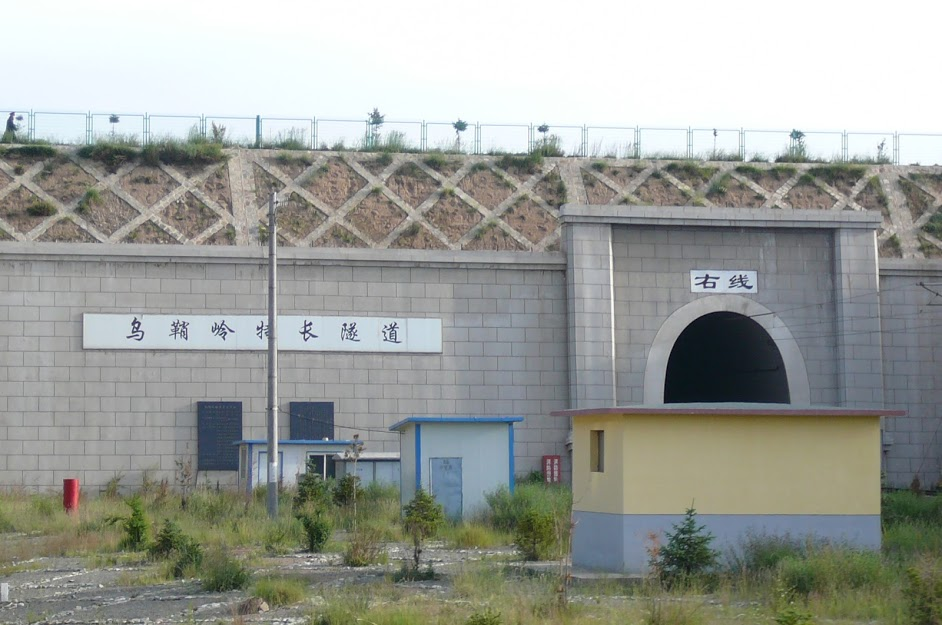

Overview
- Line: Lanzhou–Xinjiang Railway
- Crosses: Wushao Mountain

Operation
- Opened: March 2006

Technical
- Length: 21.05 km (13.08 mi)

The Wushaoling Tunnel (simplified Chinese: 乌鞘岭特长隧道; traditional Chinese: 烏鞘嶺特長隧道; pinyin: Wūshāolǐng Tècháng Suìdào) is a 21.05 km dual-bore railway tunnel in Gansu, north-west China. The east-bound bore opened on 30 March 2006. The second bore opened in August 2006. It was briefly the longest railway tunnel in China until the opening of the 27.84 km Taihang Tunnel in late 2007. In 2018, a one year reconstruction of the signaling system was started.

In 2019, construction of a parallel tunnel started, to carry the Lanzhou-Zhangye high speed railway.

== Location ==
Located on the Lanzhou-Wuwei section of the Lanzhou–Xinjiang Railway, the tunnel has reduced the distance between Dachaigou and Longgou by 30.4 km. Key to the Eurasian Land Bridge, the tunnel is part of the 3,651 km section linking Lianyungang on the East China Sea coast with Ürümqi in Northwest China.

Administratively, the tunnel is located within two county-level units of Wuwei Prefecture-level City. The eastern (actually, southeastern) portal is in Bairi Tibetan Autonomous County (a.k.a. Tianzhu Tibetan Autonomous County); the western (actually, northwestern) portal, in Gulang County.

== Infrastructure ==
The tunnel consists of two bores with centres separated by 40 m. It is designed to allow speeds of 160 km/h. The tunnel travels through complex geology, involving four regional fault zones and soft rock. The New Austrian Tunnelling method was adopted as the construction technique. An elliptical cross-section (horseshoe shape) was used for the majority of the tunnel, with a circular section used in the geologically challenging Fault Zone No. 7. The right (east-bound) bore was constructed first, while the left tunnel was a parallel drift with smaller diameter to be enlarged later. The gradient is mainly 1.1%. The Wuwei portal has an altitude of 2447 m, and the Lanzhou portal 2663 m. The maximum depth of the tunnel is 1100 m.

On 26 June 2003 Interfax reported that the total investment for the project was ¥ 7 billion ($845 million), that the project commenced construction in November 2002 and that it was scheduled to take six and a half years to complete. Also reported was that Chinese steel manufacturer Lingyuan Iron and Steel (Linggang) would provide 4,360 tons of steel products for the tunnel project.

== Incident ==
On 26 July 2009, a locomotive taking a train on the way from Xi'an to Ürümqi caught fire in the left tunnel, about 300 meters from a tunnel portal. Over 1,700 passengers were evacuated, with injuries limited to some smoke inhalation.

== Coordinates ==
- Lanzhou portal (east): 37.1236°N 102.9630°E, north of Dachaigou Town in Bairi Tibetan Autonomous County
- Wuwei portal (west): 37.2970°N 102.8998°E, south of Heisongyi Town in Gulang County
