= Lake Xima =

Lake in Gansu, China

Lake Xima 西馬湖
- Interactive map of Lake Xima 西馬湖
- Location: Minqin County, Gansu Province
- Coordinates: 39°17′N 102°43′E
- Surface area: 14 km^{2} (3,500 acres)

Lake Xima is a lake located in Caiqi Township, Minqin County, Gansu Province, People's Republic of China, located on the north bank of the Shiyang River and downstream of the Hongshui River, covering an area of about 14 square kilometers. The lake is surrounded by desert.
