= Bairi Tibetan Autonomous County =

Bairi County 天祝藏族自治县 · དཔའ་རིས་རྫོང་ Tianzhu
- Autonomous county
- དཔའ་རིས་བོད་རང་སྐྱོང་རྫོང༌། · 天祝藏族自治县; Bairi Tibetan Autonomous County
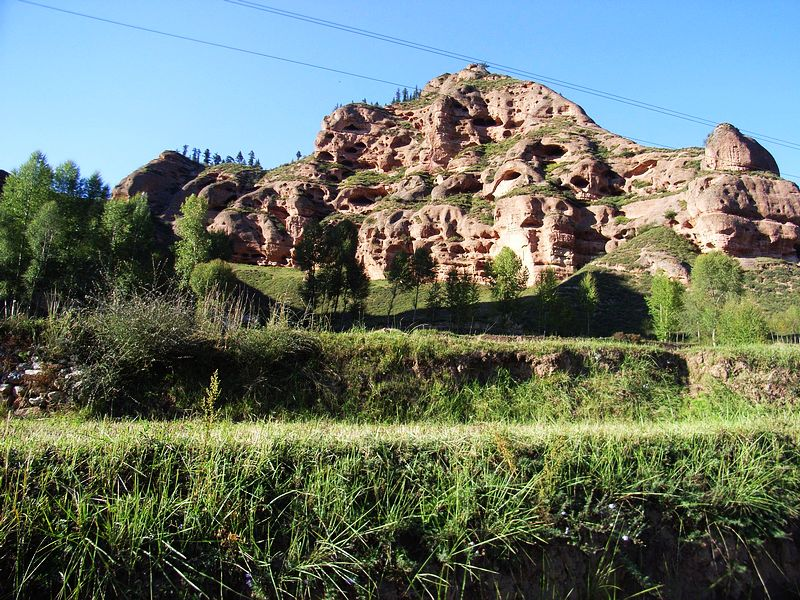

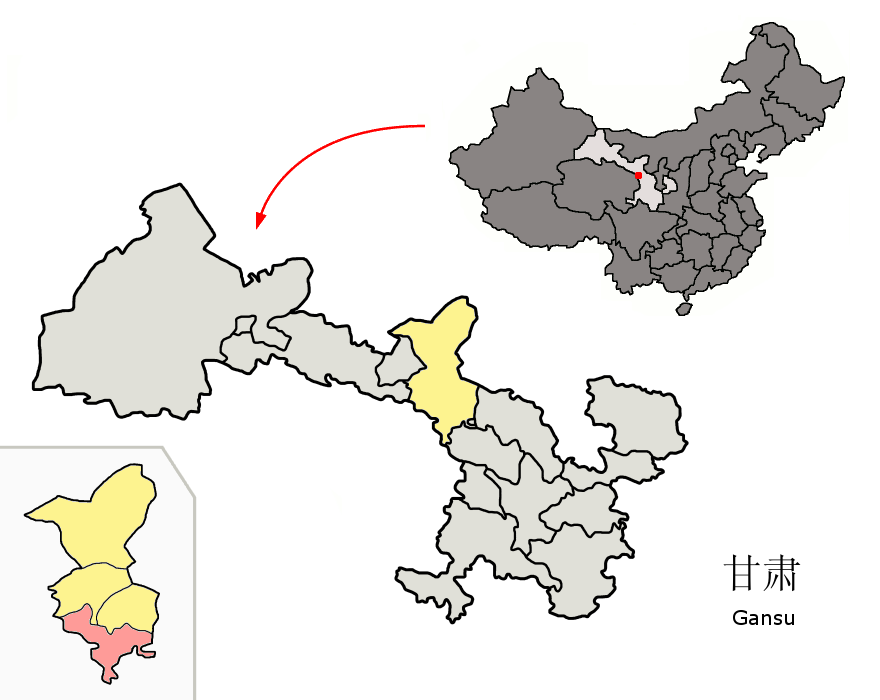
- Bairi County (red) within Wuwei City (yellow) and Gansu

- Location in Gansu Bairi County (China)
- Coordinates: 36°58′18″N 103°08′31″E
- Country: China
- Province: Gansu
- Prefecture-level city: Wuwei
- County seat: Rabgyai (Huazangsi)

Area
  - Total: 7,149 km^{2} (2,760 sq mi)
- Highest elevation: 4,874 m (15,991 ft)
- Lowest elevation: 2,040 m (6,690 ft)

Population (2020)
  - Total: 151,031
  - Density: 21.13/km^{2} (54.72/sq mi)
- Time zone: UTC+8 (China Standard)
- Postal code: 733200
- Website: www.gstianzhu.gov.cn

Bairi Tibetan Autonomous County

Chinese name
- Simplified Chinese: 天祝藏族自治县
- Traditional Chinese: 天祝藏族自治縣
Transcriptions
Standard Mandarin
- Hanyu Pinyin: Tiānzhù Zàngzú Zìzhìxiàn

Alternative Chinese name
- Simplified Chinese: 华锐
- Traditional Chinese: 華銳
Transcriptions
Standard Mandarin
- Hanyu Pinyin: Huáruì

Tibetan name
- Tibetan: དཔའ་རིས་བོད་རང་སྐྱོང་རྫོང༌།
Transcriptions
- Wylie: dpa'a-ris bod-rigs rang-skyong rdzong
- Tibetan Pinyin: Bairi Poirig Ranggyong Zong

Bairi Tibetan Autonomous County (Tibetan: དཔའ་རིས་བོད་རང་སྐྱོང་རྫོང༌།), also known as Tianzhu from its Chinese name (Chinese: 天祝藏族自治县), is in the prefecture-level city of Wuwei in the central part of Gansu province, China, bordering Qinghai province to the south and west. It has an area of 7,147 km^{2} (2,759 sq mi) and approximately 230,000 inhabitants (2003). Its administrative seat is Rabgyai Town (Huazangsi).

== Name ==
The Chinese name "Tianzhu" was named by a Tibetan lama Luo Haoxue (罗好学) in 1936, deriving from the combination of "Tiantang" (天堂寺, aka Chortentang Monastery) and "Zhugong" (祝贡寺, aka Drigung Monastery), the Chinese translation of the two largest lamaseries in the county.

The Tibetan name Bairi (དཔའ་རིས།) is pronounced Bairi in Standard Tibetan, and pronounced Hwari in the local Amdo Tibetan and Huarui (华锐) in Chinese.

An alternative Tibetan name is Tenzhu (ཐེན་ཀྲུའུ།), which is a transcription of the Chinese name Tianzhu.

== History ==
The county was established as the Tianzhu District of Yongdeng County in 1949, but became an autonomous county of Wuwei in the next year. In 1955, Tianzhu was moved under the administration of Zhangye as the first autonomous county in China. Between 1958 and 1961, Gulang County was part of Tianzhu. In 1961 the county was placed under Wuwei again.

== Administrative divisions ==
Bairi Tibetan Autonomous County is divided to 14 towns, 5 townships.

Name	Simplified Chinese	Hanyu Pinyin	Tibetan	Wylie	Administrative division code
Towns
Rabgyai Town (Huazangsi)	华藏寺镇	Huázàngsì Zhèn	རབ་རྒྱས་གྲོང་རྡལ།	rab rgyas grong rdal	620623100
Zhaxilung Town (Dachaigou)	打柴沟镇	Dǎcháigōu Zhèn	བཀྲ་ཤིས་ལུང་གྲོང་རྡལ།	bkra shis lung grong rdal	620623101
Tawain Town (Anyuan)	安远镇	Ānyuǎn Zhèn	ཏཱ་བན་གྲོང་རྡལ།	tā ban grong rdal	620623102
Kêsangnyagkai Town (Tanshanling)	炭山岭镇	Tànshānlǐng Zhèn	ཁེས་བཟང་ཉག་གའི་གྲོང་རྡལ།	khes bzang nyag gaʼi grong rdal	620623103
Pachi Town (Haxi)	哈溪镇	Hāxī Zhèn	ཕ་ཁྲི་གྲོང་རྡལ།	pha khri grong rdal	620623104
Sêrzü Town (Saishisi)	赛什斯镇	Sàishísī Zhèn	སེར་རྩུད་གྲོང་རྡལ།	ser rtsud grong rdal	620623105
Yarlung Town (Shimen)	石门镇	Shímén Zhèn	ཡར་ལུང་གྲོང་རྡལ།	yar lung grong rdal	620623106
Daglung Town (Songshan)	松山镇	Sōngshān Zhèn	སྟག་ལུང་གྲོང་རྡལ།	stag lung grong rdal	620623107
Qoidêntang Town (Tiantang)	天堂镇	Tiāntáng Zhèn	མཆོད་རྟེན་ཐང་གྲོང་རྡལ།	mchod rten thang grong rdal	620623108
Torxi Town (Duoshi)	朵什镇	Duǒshí Zhèn	དོར་ཞི་གྲོང་རྡལ།	dor zhi grong rdal	620623109
Xamar Town (Xidatan)	西大滩镇	Xīdàtān Zhèn	ཞྭ་དམར་གྲོང་རྡལ།	zhwa dmar grong rdal	620623110
Zhaxiquglung Town (Zhuaxixiulong)	抓喜秀龙镇	Zhuāxǐxiùlóng Zhèn	བཀྲ་ཤིས་ཕྱུག་ལུང་གྲོང་རྡལ།	bkra shis phyug lung grong rdal	620623111
Gyayag Town (Dahonggou)	大红沟镇	Dàhónggōu Zhèn	རྒྱ་ཡག་གྲོང་རྡལ།	rgya yag grong rdal	620623112
Sabda'gyai Town (Qilian)	祁连镇	Qílián Zhèn	སྲབ་མདའ་བརྒྱད་གྲོང་རྡལ།	srab mda' brgyad grong rdal	620623113
Townships
Dongpoin Township (Dongping)	东坪乡	Dōngpíng Xiāng	སྟོང་བོན་ཞང་།	stong bon zhang	620623201
Sêralung Township (Sailalong)	赛拉隆乡	Sàilālóng Xiāng	སེ་ར་ལུང་ཞང་།	se ra lung zhang	620623202
Gyiyangtang Township (Dongdatan)	东大滩乡	Dōngdàtān Xiāng	སྐྱིད་ཡངས་ཐང་ཞང་།	skyid yangs thang zhang	620623203
Horxugkya Township (Maozang)	毛藏乡	Máozàng Xiāng	ཧོར་ཤུག་ཁྱ་ཞང་།	hor shug khya zhang	620623208
Dainma Township (Danma)	旦马乡	Dànmǎ Xiāng	འདན་མ་ཞང་།	'dan ma zhang	620623210

Others

- Tianzhu Building Material Factory (天祝建材厂)
- Tianzhu Coal and Electricity Company (天祝煤电公司)

== Geography ==
The county is mountainous, being located at the tripoint of the Tibet Plateau, the Loess Plateau and the Inner Mongolia Plateau, with elevations ranging from 2040 m to 4874 m. It is divided into the watersheds of the Shiyang River and the Yellow River and crossed by the Wushao Mountain. South of the Wushao Mountain, the climate is continental and north of it, the climate is semi-arid. The land is mostly covered by grasslands and forests.

== Climate ==
Climate data for Bairi, elevation 2,485 m (8,153 ft), (1991–2020 normals, extremes 1991–present)
Month	Jan	Feb	Mar	Apr	May	Jun	Jul	Aug	Sep	Oct	Nov	Dec	Year
Record high °C (°F)	13.4 (56.1)	15.9 (60.6)	22.2 (72.0)	24.6 (76.3)	27.5 (81.5)	27.8 (82.0)	33.9 (93.0)	30.8 (87.4)	25.1 (77.2)	22.2 (72.0)	16.0 (60.8)	12.8 (55.0)	33.9 (93.0)
Mean daily maximum °C (°F)	−0.6 (30.9)	2.4 (36.3)	7.8 (46.0)	13.1 (55.6)	17.0 (62.6)	20.7 (69.3)	22.9 (73.2)	21.7 (71.1)	16.7 (62.1)	11.9 (53.4)	6.0 (42.8)	0.6 (33.1)	11.7 (53.0)
Daily mean °C (°F)	−10.9 (12.4)	−7.2 (19.0)	−1.0 (30.2)	5.0 (41.0)	9.6 (49.3)	14.0 (57.2)	16.0 (60.8)	14.7 (58.5)	10.0 (50.0)	4.1 (39.4)	−3.0 (26.6)	−9.7 (14.5)	3.5 (38.2)
Mean daily minimum °C (°F)	−17.6 (0.3)	−13.9 (7.0)	−7.6 (18.3)	−2.2 (28.0)	2.5 (36.5)	7.4 (45.3)	9.4 (48.9)	9.0 (48.2)	4.9 (40.8)	−1.3 (29.7)	−8.6 (16.5)	−16.1 (3.0)	−2.8 (26.9)
Record low °C (°F)	−30.0 (−22.0)	−25.5 (−13.9)	−24.9 (−12.8)	−15.7 (3.7)	−6.5 (20.3)	−1.7 (28.9)	2.8 (37.0)	0.7 (33.3)	−1.5 (29.3)	−10.1 (13.8)	−21.0 (−5.8)	−28.0 (−18.4)	−30.0 (−22.0)
Average precipitation mm (inches)	2.7 (0.11)	5.1 (0.20)	6.8 (0.27)	17.5 (0.69)	43.9 (1.73)	59.5 (2.34)	64.9 (2.56)	90.1 (3.55)	62.8 (2.47)	26.2 (1.03)	7.3 (0.29)	2.2 (0.09)	389 (15.33)
Average precipitation days (≥ 0.1 mm)	3.8	5.5	5.3	7.6	11.4	13.8	13.4	15.2	17.4	9.9	5.8	4.4	113.5
Average snowy days	6.1	8.2	6.7	5.8	2.2	0	0	0	0.5	4.6	7.5	6.0	47.6
Average relative humidity (%)	53	52	48	48	53	58	65	71	76	70	64	55	59
Mean monthly sunshine hours	228.7	216.6	242.6	232.2	230.4	202.6	211.5	185.3	166.6	204.3	214.7	226.2	2,561.7
Percentage possible sunshine	74	70	65	59	53	46	48	45	46	60	71	76	59
Source: China Meteorological Administrationall-time Nov low

Climate data for Wuqiaoling, Bairi, elevation 3,045 m (9,990 ft), (1991–2020 normals)
Month	Jan	Feb	Mar	Apr	May	Jun	Jul	Aug	Sep	Oct	Nov	Dec	Year
Mean daily maximum °C (°F)	−4.9 (23.2)	−2.5 (27.5)	1.5 (34.7)	7.0 (44.6)	11.2 (52.2)	15.0 (59.0)	17.2 (63.0)	16.2 (61.2)	11.9 (53.4)	6.6 (43.9)	1.4 (34.5)	−3.2 (26.2)	6.5 (43.6)
Daily mean °C (°F)	−11.3 (11.7)	−9.1 (15.6)	−4.7 (23.5)	1.2 (34.2)	5.7 (42.3)	10.0 (50.0)	12.3 (54.1)	11.1 (52.0)	6.7 (44.1)	0.9 (33.6)	−4.8 (23.4)	−9.5 (14.9)	0.7 (33.3)
Mean daily minimum °C (°F)	−16.1 (3.0)	−13.9 (7.0)	−9.1 (15.6)	−3.4 (25.9)	1.0 (33.8)	5.6 (42.1)	8.0 (46.4)	7.1 (44.8)	3.0 (37.4)	−2.9 (26.8)	−9.2 (15.4)	−14.3 (6.3)	−3.7 (25.4)
Average precipitation mm (inches)	3.0 (0.12)	5.2 (0.20)	11.7 (0.46)	19.1 (0.75)	41.9 (1.65)	70.3 (2.77)	91.0 (3.58)	93.2 (3.67)	66.4 (2.61)	22.6 (0.89)	4.9 (0.19)	2.0 (0.08)	431.3 (16.97)
Average precipitation days (≥ 0.1 mm)	5.4	8.0	11.5	11.4	14.1	14.7	16.6	17.7	17.0	11.7	5.6	4.4	138.1
Average snowy days	9.2	11.3	15.7	13.8	11.2	1.4	0.1	0.4	4.4	13.0	8.9	7.9	97.3
Average relative humidity (%)	49	53	55	54	58	61	68	73	74	65	52	47	59
Mean monthly sunshine hours	232.4	221.9	239.7	235.1	235.5	211.8	213.4	193.1	176.3	218.4	237.0	236.2	2,650.8
Percentage possible sunshine	75	72	64	59	53	48	48	47	48	64	79	80	61
Source: China Meteorological Administration

== Transport ==
- China National Highway 312
- Lanzhou–Xinjiang Railway crosses the county, with a station (Tianzhu) in the county seat. With the construction of the Wushaoling Tunnel under the Wushao Mountain Range (Wushaoling), about the half of the section of the main track of this railway within this county is actually underground.

== Ethnic groups in Tianzhu, 2000 census ==
Nationality	Population	Percentage
Han	139,190	62.88%
Tibetan	66,125	29.87%
Tu	12,633	5.71%
Hui	1,986	0.9%
Mongol	961	0.43%
Manchu	213	0.1%
Dongxiang	90	0.04%
Uyghur	40	0.02%
Miao	23	0.01%
Others	86	0.04%
