= Wuwei Confucius Temple =

Confucian temple in Wuwei, Gansu, China

- 武威文庙
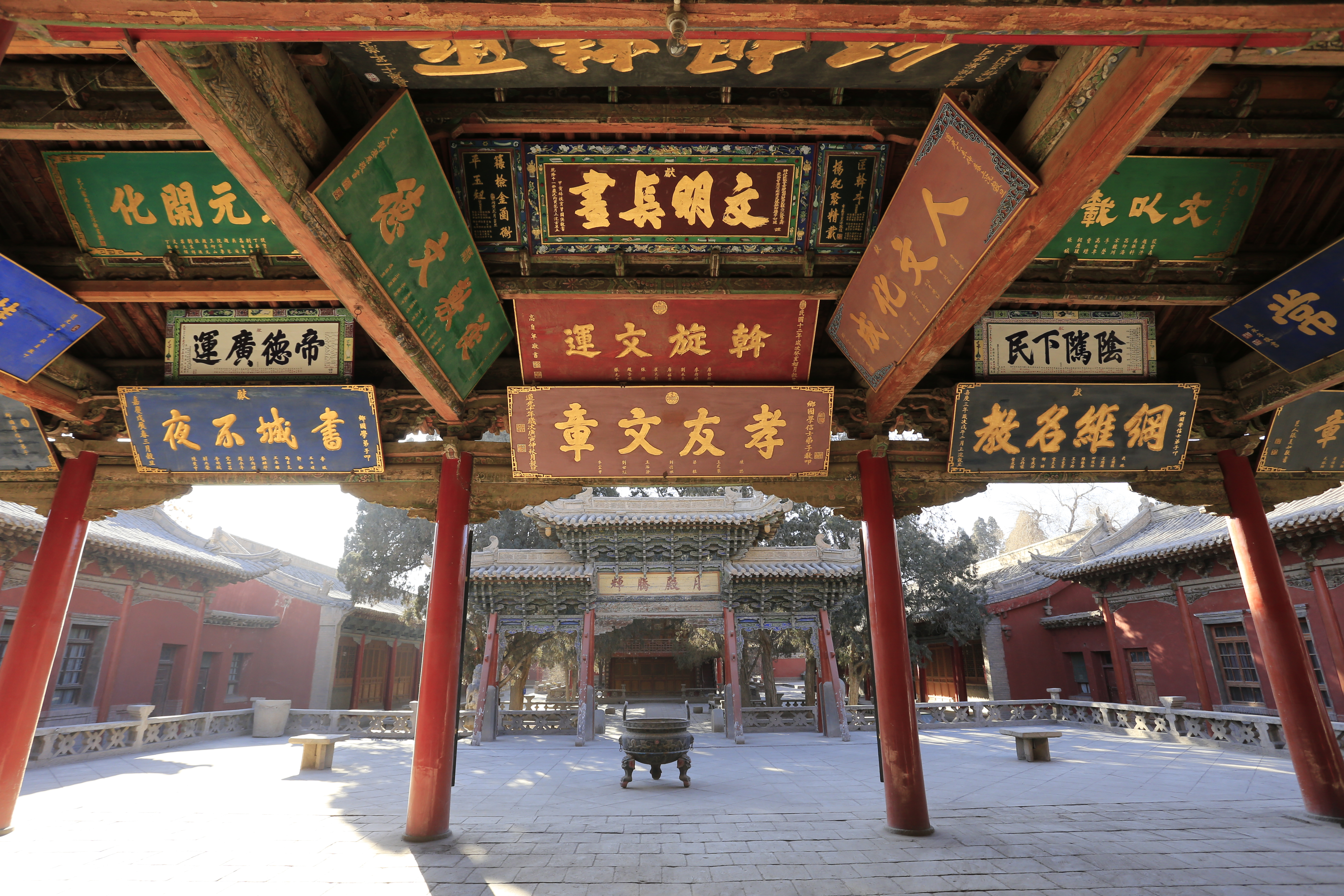

- Location within Gansu Location within China

Religion
- Affiliation: Confucianism

Location
- Location: In the southeast corner of the urban area of Wuwei
- Interactive map of Wuwei Confucius Temple
- Coordinates: 37.9242°N 102.6422°E

Wuwei Confucius Temple (simplified Chinese: 武威文庙; traditional Chinese: 武威文廟), or Wuwei Confucian Temple, is a Confucian temple located in Liangzhou District, Wuwei City, Gansu Province. It is the largest Confucian temple in Northwest China in terms of scale of construction, covering an area of 15,300 square meters.

Wuwei Confucius Temple complex is divided into two sections: the Confucius Temple and the Wenchang Hall. The Temple was hailed as the "Crown of Longyou Academy" (陇右学宫之冠) during the Ming and Qing dynasties.

== History ==
Wuwei Confucius Temple was built in the 2nd to 4th year of Zhengtong of the Ming Dynasty (1437-1439), and was rebuilt and expanded several times during Chenghua, Shunzhi, Kangxi, Qianlong, Daoguang and the Republic of China.

== Conservation ==
In 1996, Wuwei Confucius Temple was listed as the fourth batch of Major Historical and Cultural Site Protected at the National Level in China.
