= Gulang County =

Gulang County 古浪县
- County
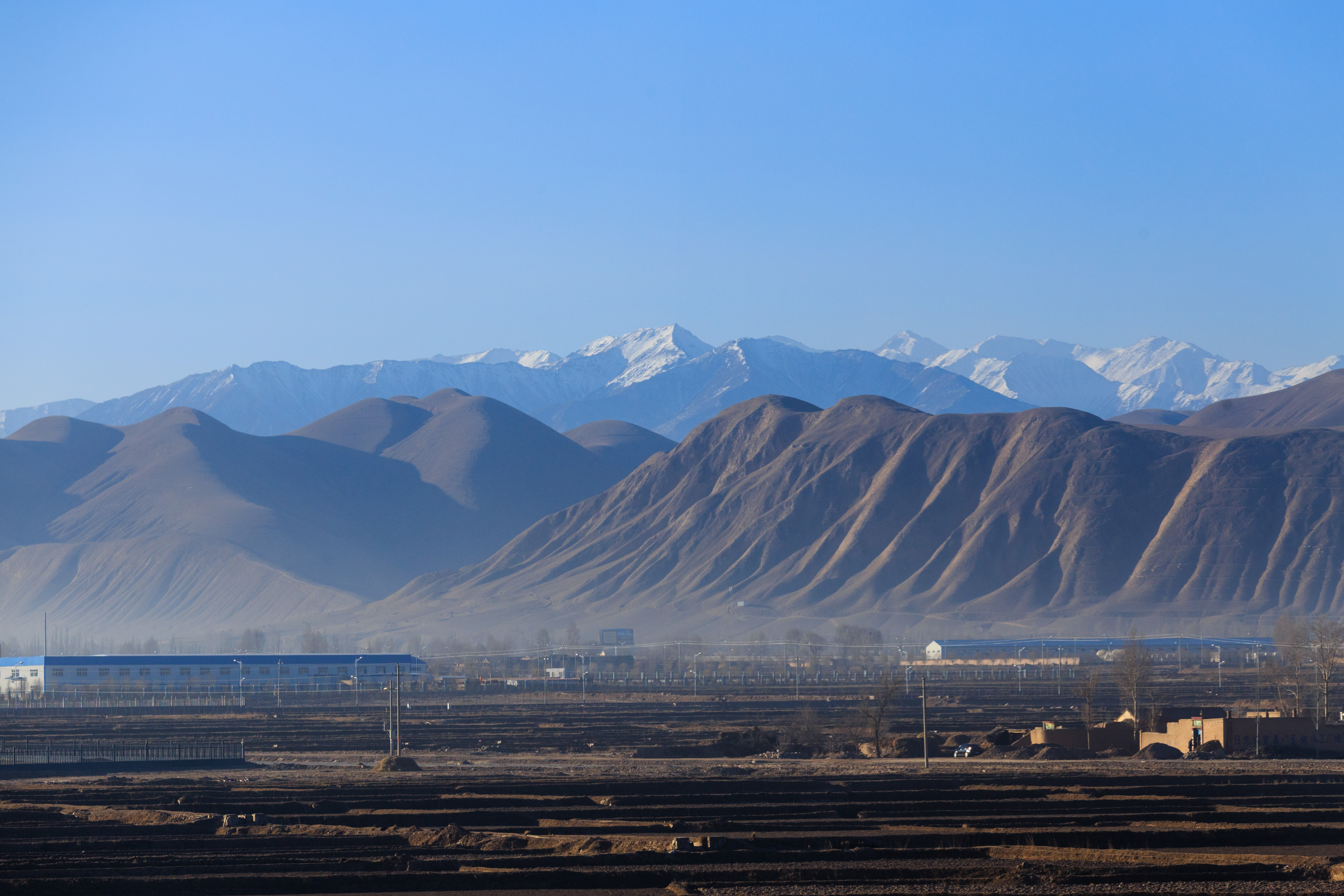
- View of the Gulang County seat from the Lanzhou–Xinjiang railway

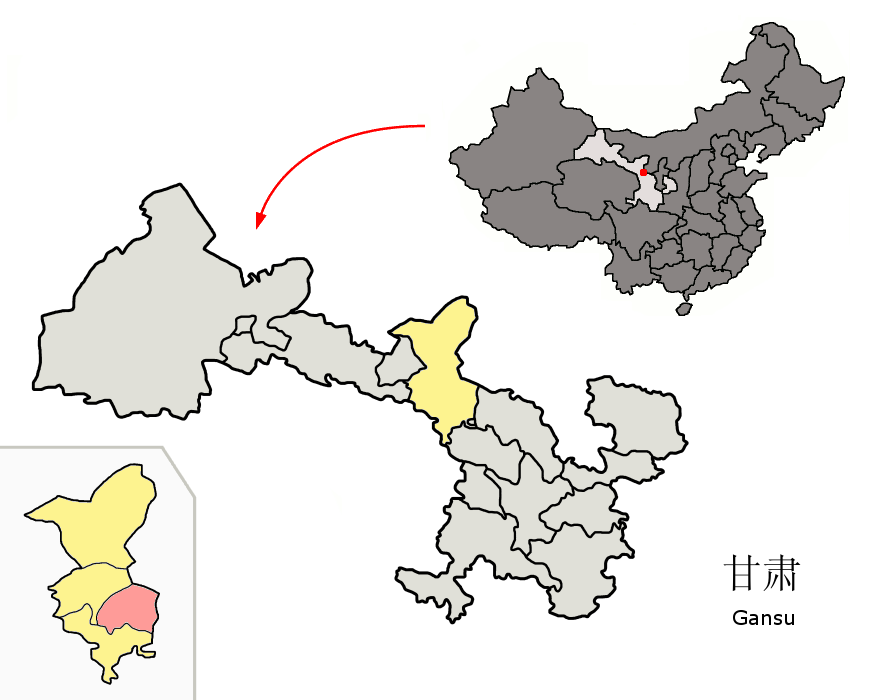
- Location of Gulang County (red) in Wuwei City (yellow) and Gansu province

- Location of the seat in Gansu
- Coordinates: 37°28′12″N 102°53′53″E
- Country: China
- Province: Gansu
- Prefecture-level city: Wuwei
- County seat: Gulang Town

Area
  - Total: 5,103 km^{2} (1,970 sq mi)
- Highest elevation: 3,469 m (11,381 ft)
- Lowest elevation: 1,550 m (5,090 ft)

Population (2018)
  - Total: 388,700
  - Density: 76.17/km^{2} (197.3/sq mi)
- Time zone: UTC+8 (China Standard)
- Postal code: 733100
- Website: www.gulang.gov.cn

Gulang County (Chinese: 古浪县; pinyin: Gǔlàng Xiàn) is a county in central Gansu province, China, bordering Inner Mongolia to the northeast. It is under the administration of Wuwei City. Its postal code is 733100, and its population in 2006 was 393,200 people. Located in the east of the Hexi Corridor and to the south of the Tengger Desert, it borders Jingtai County to the east, Tianzhu County to the south, Liangzhou District to the northwest, and Inner Mongolia's Alxa Left Banner to the northeast.

== Geography ==
The county has a total area of 5,103 km^{2} (1,970 sq mi) and is 88 km (55 mi) wide. It features a cold desert climate, with an annual mean temperature of 5.6 °C (42.1 °F) and the annual evaporation of 2,300 mm (91 in) exceeding the annual precipitation of around 300 mm (12 in); annual sunshine duration is 2,852 hours.

== Climate ==
Climate data for Gulang, elevation 2,072 m (6,798 ft), (1991–2020 normals, extremes 1981–2010)
Month	Jan	Feb	Mar	Apr	May	Jun	Jul	Aug	Sep	Oct	Nov	Dec	Year
Record high °C (°F)	14.6 (58.3)	22.5 (72.5)	24.3 (75.7)	28.6 (83.5)	29.9 (85.8)	30.7 (87.3)	35.0 (95.0)	32.1 (89.8)	29.7 (85.5)	25.3 (77.5)	20.6 (69.1)	17.2 (63.0)	35.0 (95.0)
Mean daily maximum °C (°F)	−1.7 (28.9)	1.8 (35.2)	7.4 (45.3)	14.2 (57.6)	18.9 (66.0)	23.0 (73.4)	25.1 (77.2)	23.6 (74.5)	18.4 (65.1)	12.3 (54.1)	6.0 (42.8)	0.4 (32.7)	12.5 (54.4)
Daily mean °C (°F)	−8.0 (17.6)	−4.5 (23.9)	1.3 (34.3)	7.9 (46.2)	12.9 (55.2)	17.2 (63.0)	19.1 (66.4)	17.7 (63.9)	12.8 (55.0)	6.4 (43.5)	−0.4 (31.3)	−6.2 (20.8)	6.4 (43.4)
Mean daily minimum °C (°F)	−12.3 (9.9)	−9.1 (15.6)	−3.3 (26.1)	2.5 (36.5)	7.3 (45.1)	11.8 (53.2)	13.8 (56.8)	12.9 (55.2)	8.5 (47.3)	2.3 (36.1)	−4.5 (23.9)	−10.4 (13.3)	1.6 (34.9)
Record low °C (°F)	−25.0 (−13.0)	−21.7 (−7.1)	−19.9 (−3.8)	−14.1 (6.6)	−7.3 (18.9)	0.6 (33.1)	5.4 (41.7)	4.0 (39.2)	−2.8 (27.0)	−20.2 (−4.4)	−22.2 (−8.0)	−29.0 (−20.2)	−29.0 (−20.2)
Average precipitation mm (inches)	4.0 (0.16)	5.6 (0.22)	16.1 (0.63)	27.3 (1.07)	41.6 (1.64)	48.0 (1.89)	61.3 (2.41)	69.1 (2.72)	56.2 (2.21)	22.8 (0.90)	8.7 (0.34)	3.7 (0.15)	364.4 (14.34)
Average precipitation days (≥ 0.1 mm)	4.9	4.6	6.3	6.5	9.4	9.7	11.7	12.0	12.2	7.4	4.0	3.8	92.5
Average snowy days	6.9	6.7	8.8	5.3	1.6	0.1	0	0	0.3	4.2	6.2	6.6	46.7
Average relative humidity (%)	46	44	45	44	46	49	56	59	62	56	48	47	50
Mean monthly sunshine hours	202.9	204.7	229.4	232.0	252.9	239.6	240.8	226.0	193.9	217.4	214.3	204.7	2,658.6
Percentage possible sunshine	66	66	61	58	57	55	54	54	53	63	71	69	61
Source: China Meteorological Administration

== History ==
Evidence has been found of Gulang being inhabited 4000 years ago, during the Neolithic.

Between 14 and 18 November 1936 the Battle of Gulang was fought between the Red Army and the Ma clique.

== Administrative divisions ==
Gulang County is divided to 15 towns and 4 townships.

Towns

- Gulang (古浪镇)
- Sishui (泗水镇)
- Tumen (土门镇)
- Dajing (大靖镇)
- Peijiaying (裴家营镇)
- Haizitan (海子滩镇)
- Dingning (定宁镇)
- Huangyangchuan (黄羊川镇)
- Heisongyi (黑松驿镇)
- Yongfengtan (永丰滩镇)
- Huanghuatan (黄花滩镇)
- Xijing (西靖镇)
- Minquan (民权镇)
- Zhitan (直滩镇)
- Gufeng (古丰镇)

Townships

- Xinpu Township (新堡乡)
- Gancheng Township (干城乡)
- Hengliang Township (横梁乡)
- Shibalipu Township (十八里堡乡)

== Economy ==
The main economy is agriculture, with 365600 people being employed in agriculture (92.98% of total population).

== Transport ==
- China National Highway 312

== Ethnic groups ==
Among the groups that live in Gulang are the Han and Hui.

== See also ==
- List of administrative divisions of Gansu
