= Minqin County =

Minqin County 民勤县
- County
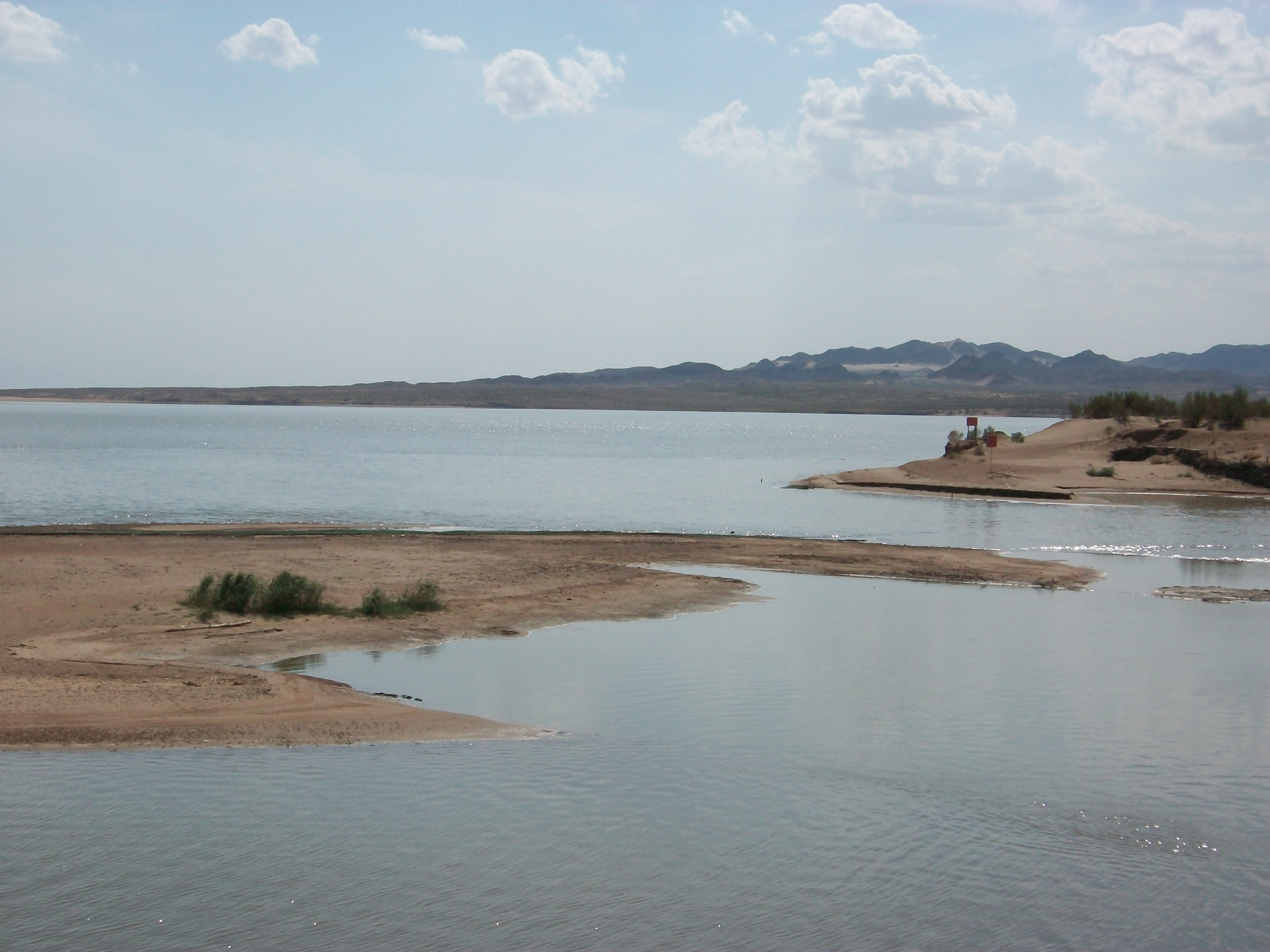

- Location of the seat in Gansu
- Coordinates: 38°37′26″N 103°05′38″E
- Country: China
- Province: Gansu
- Prefecture-level city: Wuwei
- County seat: Sanlei

Area
  - Total: 15,900 km^{2} (6,100 sq mi)

Population (2020)
  - Total: 241,400
  - Density: 15.2/km^{2} (39.3/sq mi)
- Time zone: UTC+8 (China Standard)
- Postal code: 733300

Minqin County (Chinese: 民勤县; pinyin: Mínqín Xiàn) is a county of Gansu province, China. It is under the jurisdiction of Wuwei City. Its postal code is 733300, and its population in 1999 was 281,826 people.

In older literature, today's Minqin is referred to as Zhenfan (Chinese: 镇番; Wade–Giles: Chen-fan). According to Pyotr Kozlov, the Mongol name for the city was Sogo Khoto.

Geographically, Minqin county occupies one of Gansu's panhandles, bordering in the north, east, and southeast on the Alashan League of Inner Mongolia.

== History ==
Historically, Chinese agricultural settlement in the area was made possible by the Shiyang River, flowing from the Qilian Mountains. However, the livelihood of Chinese farmers here was often precarious; in the 1920s it was considered as somewhat of a regular famine district. Large number of Zhenfan people, nicknamed "Sand-hollow Mice", worked as "camel-pullers" with caravans owned by Mongols from the adjacent Alashan, or moved—temporarily or permanently—to Xinjiang. For example, as of 1926, the main population of the small oasis of Santanghu (now, officially, Santanghu (三塘湖乡) in what's today Barkol Kazakh Autonomous County of Xinjiang were migrants from Minqin (Zhenfan) and their descendants.

By the late 20th century, the environmental situation in the Minqin area deteriorated, as smaller amounts of the Shiyang River water reached the area, due to the increased irrigation of use of it upstream. Ground water levels fell, and desertification became a serious threat. Minqin is now identified as one of the major sources of sandstorms in China.

== Climate ==
Climate data for Minqin, elevation 1,368 m (4,488 ft), (1991–2020 normals, extremes 1971–2010)
| Month | Jan | Feb | Mar | Apr | May | Jun | Jul | Aug | Sep | Oct | Nov | Dec | Year |
|---|---|---|---|---|---|---|---|---|---|---|---|---|---|
| Record high °C (°F) | 14.0 (57.2) | 22.9 (73.2) | 26.5 (79.7) | 33.9 (93.0) | 34.8 (94.6) | 37.1 (98.8) | 41.7 (107.1) | 38.0 (100.4) | 35.4 (95.7) | 27.5 (81.5) | 22.0 (71.6) | 17.3 (63.1) | 41.7 (107.1) |
| Mean daily maximum °C (°F) | −0.5 (31.1) | 4.6 (40.3) | 11.7 (53.1) | 19.4 (66.9) | 24.9 (76.8) | 29.4 (84.9) | 31.2 (88.2) | 29.4 (84.9) | 23.9 (75.0) | 16.9 (62.4) | 8.6 (47.5) | 1.2 (34.2) | 16.7 (62.1) |
| Daily mean °C (°F) | −8.0 (17.6) | −3.1 (26.4) | 4.1 (39.4) | 11.8 (53.2) | 17.7 (63.9) | 22.4 (72.3) | 24.1 (75.4) | 22.4 (72.3) | 16.7 (62.1) | 9.0 (48.2) | 1.0 (33.8) | −6.0 (21.2) | 9.3 (48.8) |
| Mean daily minimum °C (°F) | −14.3 (6.3) | −9.8 (14.4) | −2.7 (27.1) | 4.5 (40.1) | 10.3 (50.5) | 15.3 (59.5) | 17.4 (63.3) | 16.1 (61.0) | 10.5 (50.9) | 2.6 (36.7) | −4.9 (23.2) | −11.8 (10.8) | 2.8 (37.0) |
| Record low °C (°F) | −29.4 (−20.9) | −29.5 (−21.1) | −20.9 (−5.6) | −9.4 (15.1) | −4.1 (24.6) | 4.8 (40.6) | 8.1 (46.6) | 6.3 (43.3) | −2.3 (27.9) | −12.9 (8.8) | −19.7 (−3.5) | −26.9 (−16.4) | −29.5 (−21.1) |
| Average precipitation mm (inches) | 1.4 (0.06) | 0.8 (0.03) | 2.7 (0.11) | 6.1 (0.24) | 13.1 (0.52) | 14.6 (0.57) | 26.6 (1.05) | 25.2 (0.99) | 21.6 (0.85) | 7.0 (0.28) | 1.3 (0.05) | 0.5 (0.02) | 120.9 (4.77) |
| Average precipitation days (≥ 0.1 mm) | 1.5 | 1.0 | 1.5 | 2.3 | 4.2 | 5.1 | 6.9 | 6.6 | 6.1 | 2.9 | 1.4 | 0.9 | 40.4 |
| Average snowy days | 3.2 | 2.3 | 2.0 | 0.9 | 0.1 | 0 | 0 | 0 | 0 | 0.7 | 2.2 | 1.9 | 13.3 |
| Average relative humidity (%) | 48 | 40 | 34 | 30 | 33 | 39 | 48 | 51 | 53 | 48 | 47 | 49 | 43 |
| Mean monthly sunshine hours | 237.1 | 230.9 | 267.6 | 279.2 | 310.9 | 302.3 | 301.7 | 284.8 | 244.2 | 258.7 | 238.1 | 233.8 | 3,189.3 |
| Percentage possible sunshine | 78 | 75 | 72 | 70 | 70 | 68 | 67 | 68 | 66 | 76 | 80 | 80 | 73 |
Source: China Meteorological Administration

== Administrative divisions ==
Minqin County is divided to 18 towns.

Towns

- Sanlei (三雷镇)
- Dongba (东坝镇)
- Quanshan (泉山镇)
- Xiqu (西渠镇)
- Donghu (东湖镇)
- Hongshagang (红砂岗镇)
- Changning (昌宁镇)
- Chongxing (重兴镇)
- Xuebai (薛百镇)
- Daba (大坝镇)
- Suwu (苏武镇)
- Datan (大滩镇)
- Shuangcike (双茨科镇)
- Hongshaliang (红沙梁镇)
- Caiqi (蔡旗镇)
- Jiahe (夹河镇)
- Shoucheng (收成镇)
- Nanhu (南湖镇)

== See also ==
- List of administrative divisions of Gansu
