= Wuwei, Gansu =

Wuwei 武威市
- Prefecture-level city
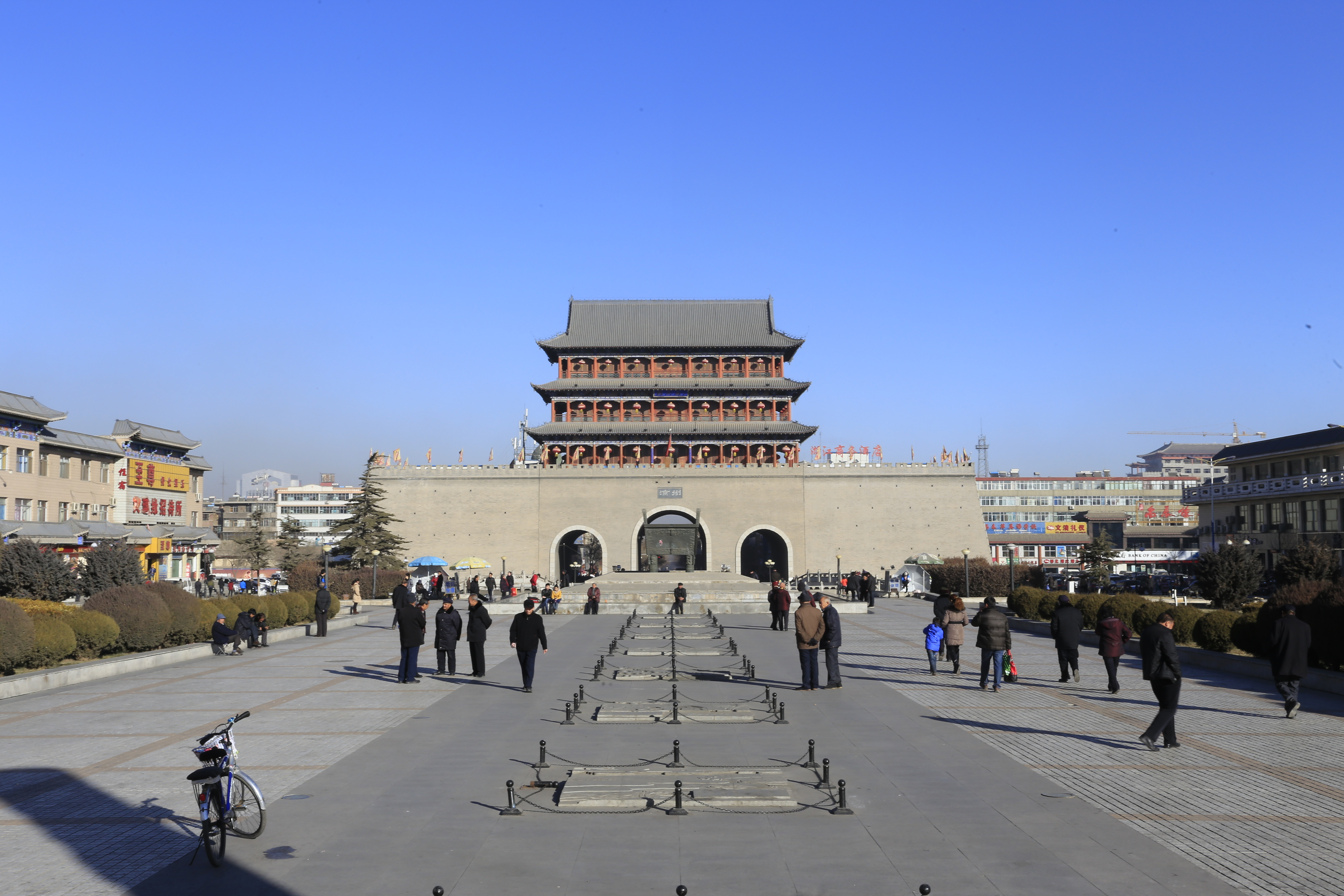
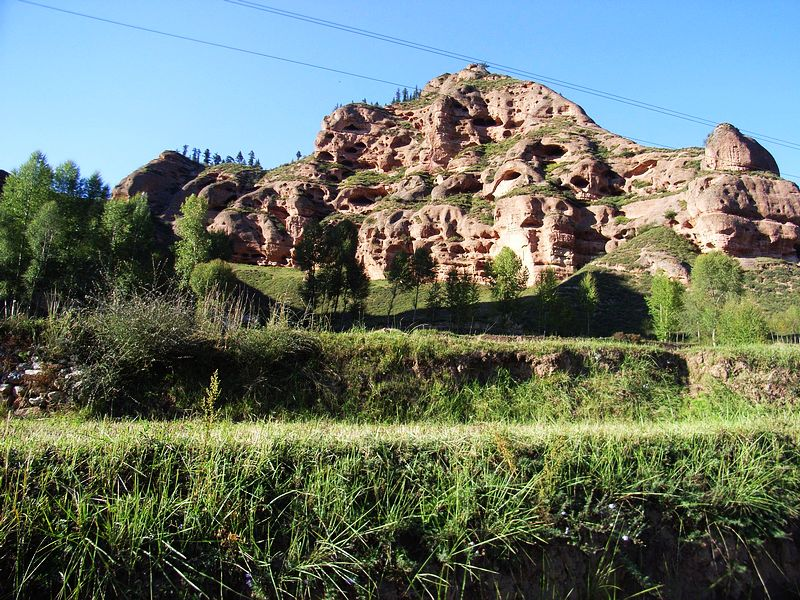
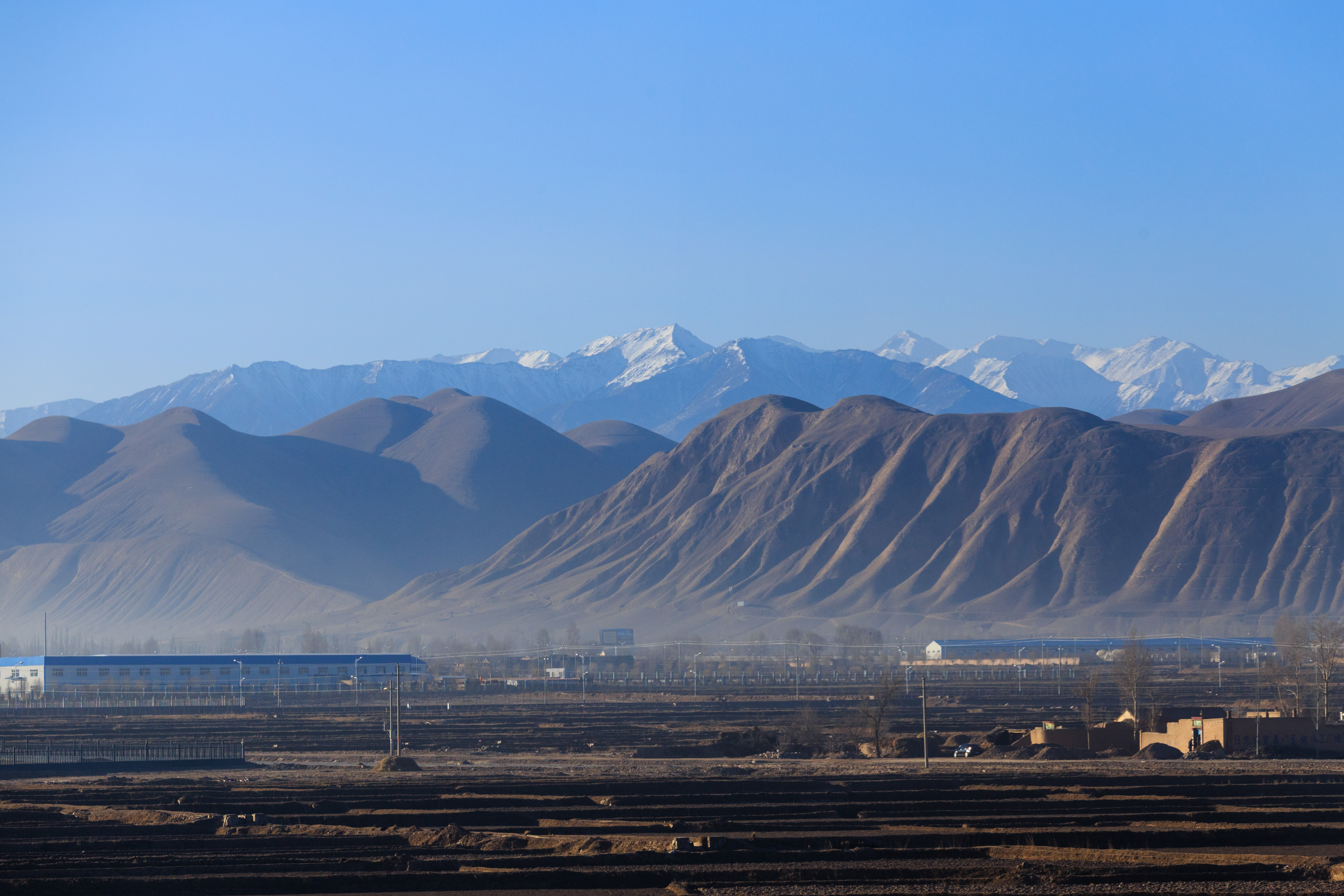
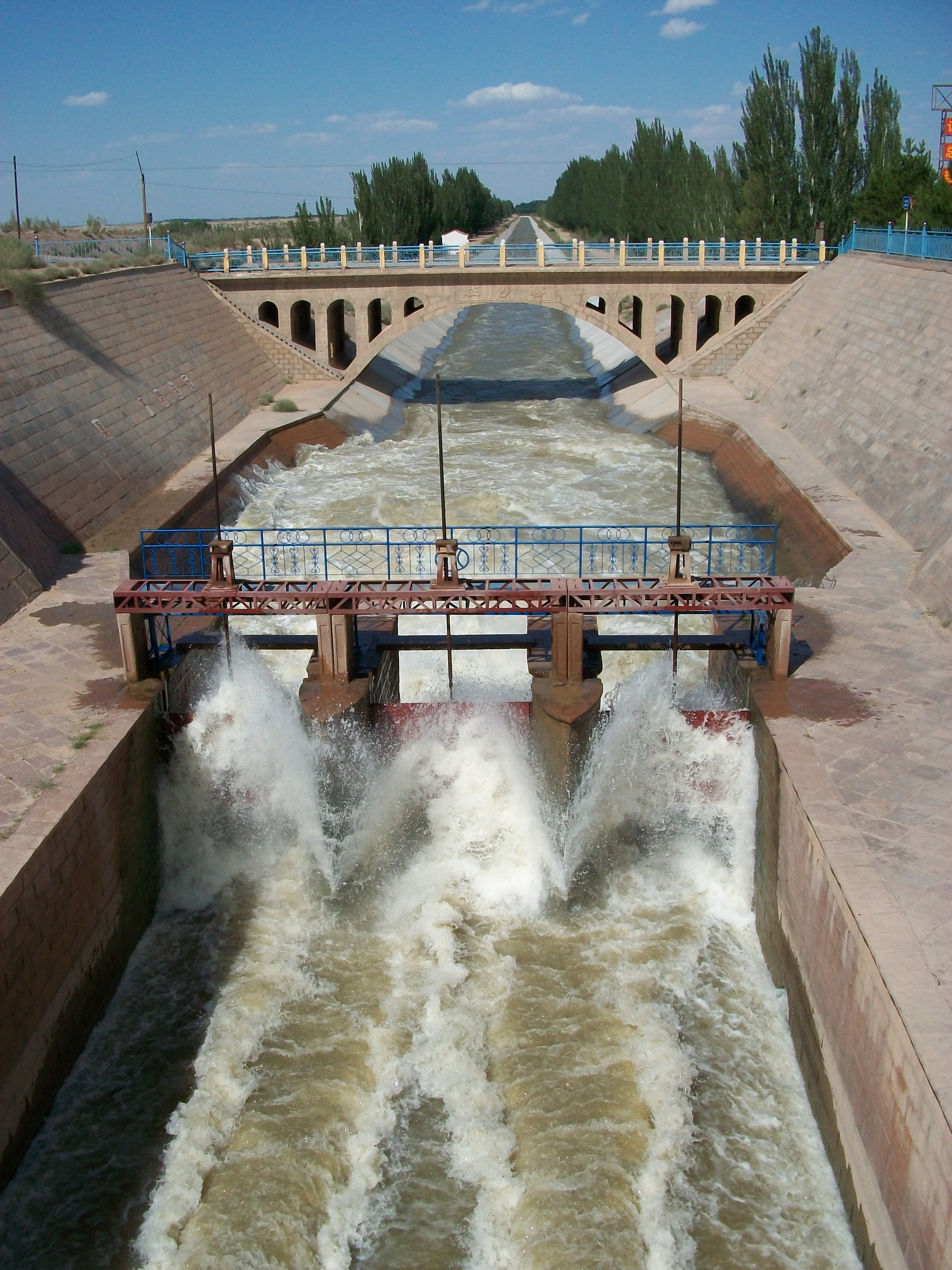
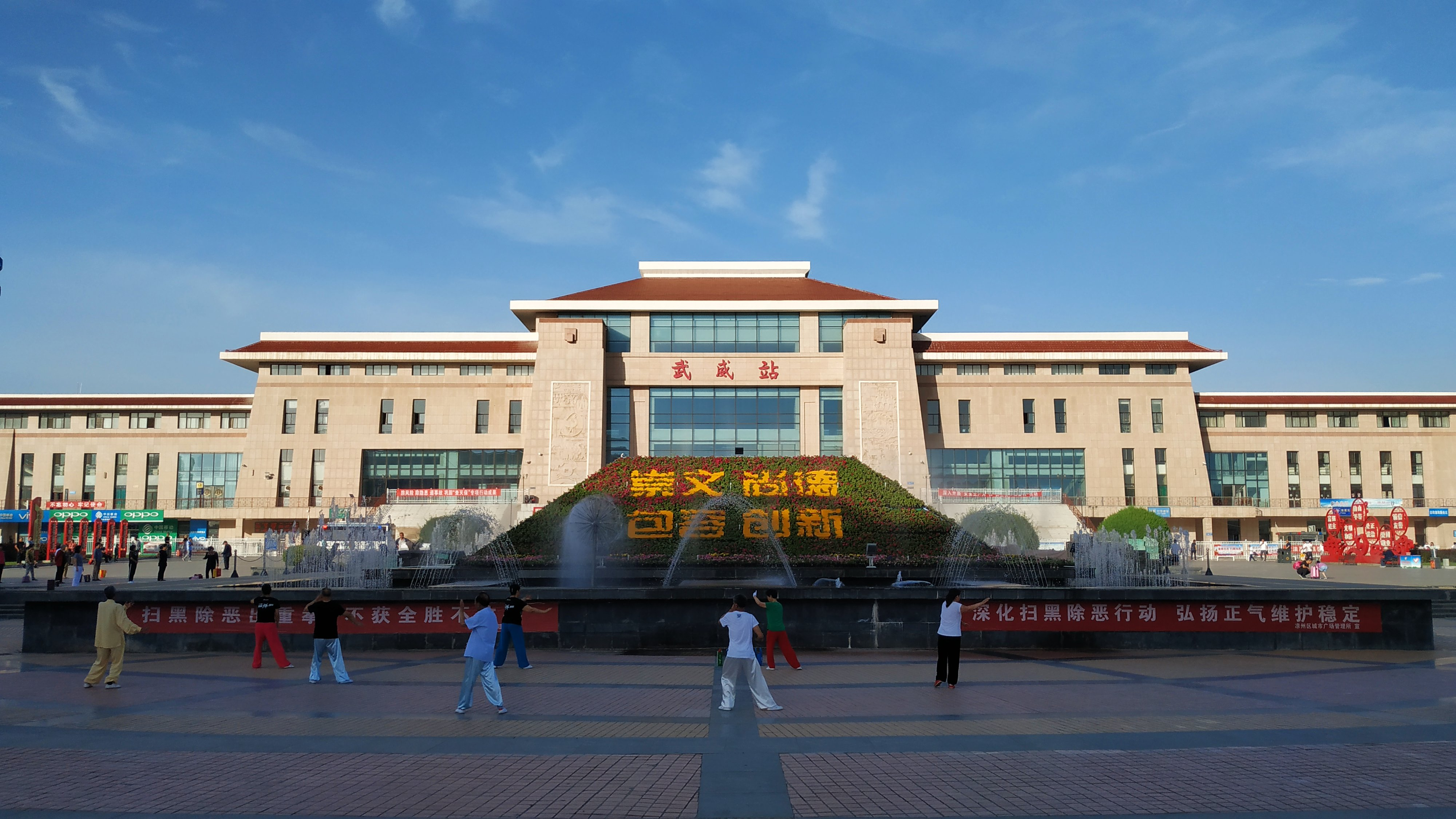
- Clockwise from top: South Gate of Wuwei, seat of Gulang County, Wuwei railway station, Hongyashan Reservoir in Minqin County, rock formation in Tianzhu County.

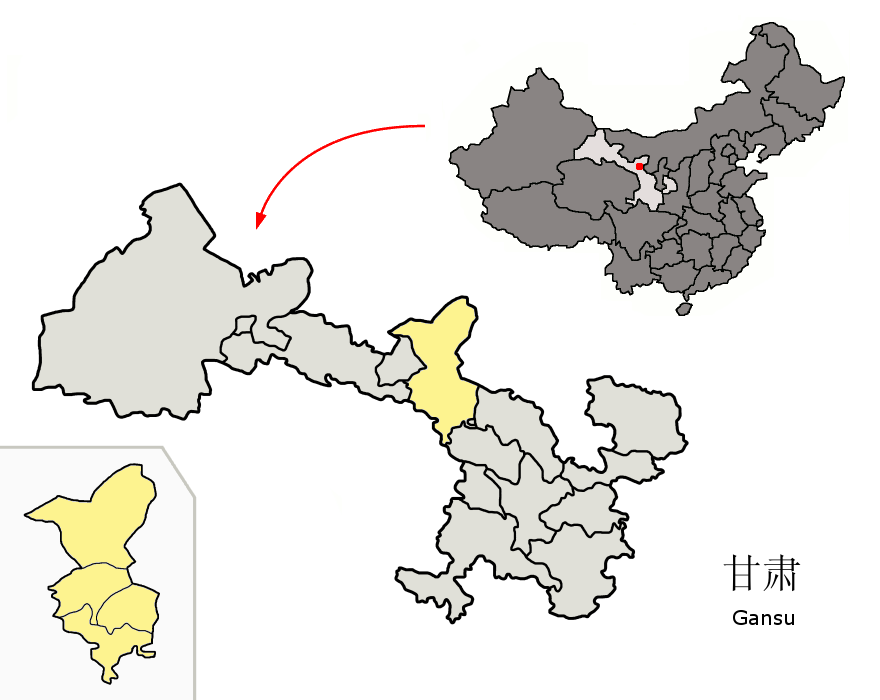
- Location of Wuwei City jurisdiction in Gansu

- Location within Gansu Location within China
- Coordinates (Wuwei municipal government): 37°55′44″N 102°38′17″E
- Country: People's Republic of China
- Province: Gansu
- Municipal seat: Liangzhou District

Area
  - Prefecture-level city: 33,000 km^{2} (13,000 sq mi)

Population (2020)
  - Prefecture-level city: 1,464,955
  - Density: 44/km^{2} (110/sq mi)
  - Urban: 688,697

GDP
  - Prefecture-level city: CN¥ 41.6 billion US$ 6.7 billion
  - Per capita: CN¥ 22,930; US$ 3,682
- Time zone: UTC+8 (CST)
- ISO 3166 code: CN-GS-06
- Website: www.ww.gansu.gov.cn

Wuwei (Chinese: 武威; pinyin: Wǔwēi) is a prefecture-level city in northwest central Gansu province. In the north it borders Inner Mongolia, in the southwest, Qinghai. Its central location between three western capitals, Lanzhou, Xining, and Yinchuan makes it an important business and transportation hub for the area. Because of its position along the Hexi Corridor, historically the only route from central China to western China and the rest of Central Asia, many major railroads and national highways pass through Wuwei.

== History ==
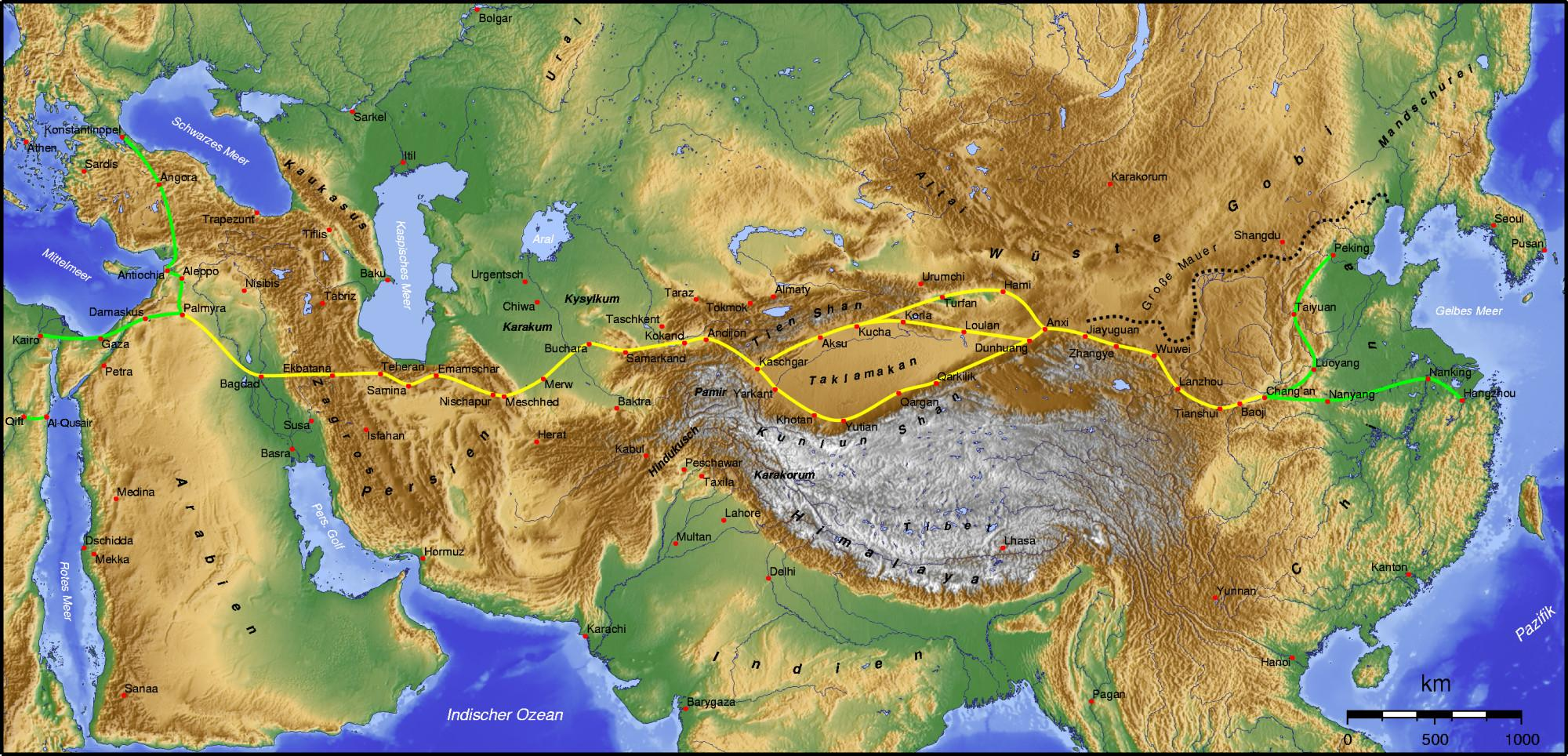
The Silk Road in its entirety

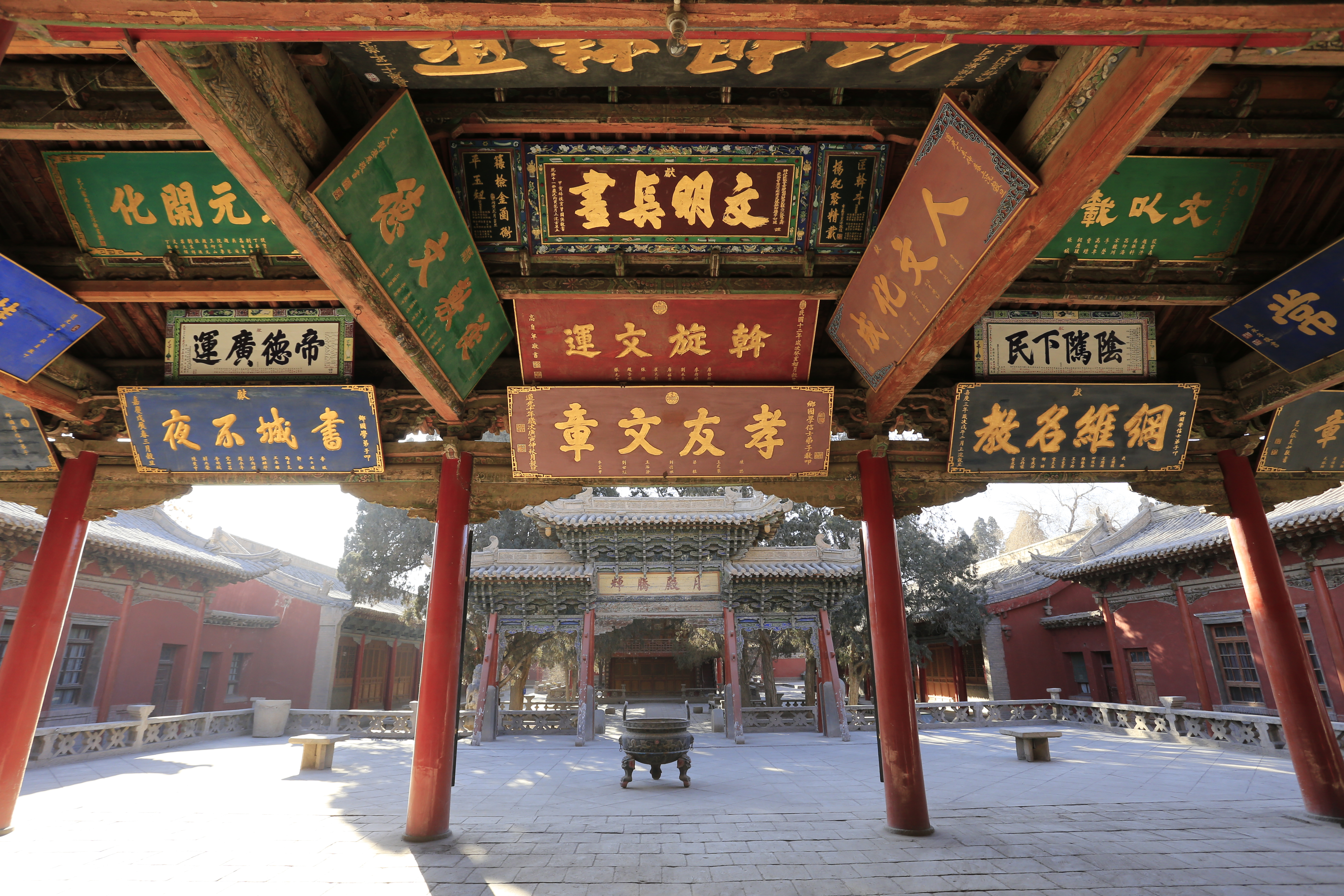
Wuwei Confucius Temple

People began settling here about 5,000 years ago. In ancient historic times, Wuwei was called Guzang (姑臧) or Liangzhou (涼州—the name retained by today's Wuwei's central urban district) and found importance as the capital of various states at the eastern terminus of the Hexi Corridor. It was a key link for the Northern Silk Road, and a number of important archaeological finds were uncovered from Wuwei, including ancient copper carts with stone animals. The motifs and types of objects in the Wuwei graves, as well as their earthenware, lacquer, and bronze composition, constitute typical examples of the Han Chinese burial style that can be found all over China. Other graves found along the Hexi Corridor show Xiongnu and other minority influence, which are used to trace regimes such as the Northern Liang. It became an important provincial capital during the Former Han dynasty as the Hou Hanshu makes clear:

"In the third year [170 CE], Meng Tuo, the Inspector of Liangzhou (modern Wuwei), sent the Assistant Officer Ren She, commanding five hundred soldiers from Dunhuang. He, with the Wuji Major Cao Kuan, and Chief Clerk of the Western Regions, Zhang Yan, brought troops from Yanqi (Karashahr), Qiuci (Kucha), and the Nearer and Further Kingdoms of Jushi (Turfan and Jimasa), altogether numbering more than 30,000, to punish Shule (Kashgar). They attacked the town of Zhenzhong (Arach) but, having stayed for more than forty days without being able to subdue it, they withdrew. Following this, the kings of Shule (Kashgar) killed one another repeatedly and, for its part, the Imperial Government was unable to prevent it."

In 121 BC Han emperor Wudi brought his cavalry here to defend the Hexi Corridor against the Xiongnu Huns. His military success allowed him to expand the corridor westward. Its importance as a stop along the Silk Road made it a crossroads of cultures and ethnic groups from all over central Asia. Numerous Buddhist grottoes and temples in the area attest to its role as a path for bringing Buddhism from India and Afghanistan to China.

During the Three Kingdoms period (184-280), Liangzhou was governed by Ma Teng. After the death of Ma Teng, Ma Chao assumed the post and governed the province for a short time before it fell into the hands of Cao Cao, ruler of Cao Wei.

Liangzhou was briefly (from 400 to 421) a state during the Sixteen Kingdoms period.

Famous cultural relics from Wuwei include the Galloping Bronze Horse, Western Xia mausoleums, Wuwei White Towers Temple (白塔寺), the Tiantishan Caves, the Luoshi (Kumārajīva) Temple (罗什寺塔), and the Wuwei Confucius Temple.

== Geography and climate ==
Wuwei is located in the Hexi Corridor between the Tibetan Plateau and Mongolian Plateau. The south of Wuwei is higher than the north, with an elevation ranging from 1,020 to 4,874 metres (3,346 to 15,991 ft) above sea-level. Its area is 33,000 km^{2} (13,000 sq mi). Average annual temperature is 7.8 °C (46.0 °F). The climate is a cold desert climate (Köppen BWk), with precipitation between 60 and 610 mm (2.4 and 24.0 in). Evaporation is from 1,400 to 3,000 mm (55 to 118 in), creating a net loss of water each year. There are 2200–3000 sunlight hours each year and 85–165 frost free days. Summer temperatures can be in excess of 45.0 °C (113.0 °F), in the shade are by no means unheard of.

Southwest of Wuwei, there is a 230 metres (750 ft) thick Tianzhu Formation made of clastics intercalated with sandy shale and shale. Minerals deposits occurring in the vicinity of Wuwei include graphite, iron, titanium, and limestone.

Climate data for Wuwei, elevation 1,540 m (5,050 ft), (1991–2020 normals, extremes 1971–2010)
| Month | Jan | Feb | Mar | Apr | May | Jun | Jul | Aug | Sep | Oct | Nov | Dec | Year |
|---|---|---|---|---|---|---|---|---|---|---|---|---|---|
| Record high °C (°F) | 15.5 (59.9) | 22.3 (72.1) | 28.1 (82.6) | 32.7 (90.9) | 34.2 (93.6) | 35.0 (95.0) | 40.8 (105.4) | 37.3 (99.1) | 34.9 (94.8) | 27.8 (82.0) | 22.8 (73.0) | 17.9 (64.2) | 40.8 (105.4) |
| Mean daily maximum °C (°F) | 0.1 (32.2) | 4.8 (40.6) | 11.4 (52.5) | 18.8 (65.8) | 23.6 (74.5) | 27.8 (82.0) | 29.8 (85.6) | 28.1 (82.6) | 22.9 (73.2) | 16.6 (61.9) | 9.0 (48.2) | 1.9 (35.4) | 16.2 (61.2) |
| Daily mean °C (°F) | −7.2 (19.0) | −2.7 (27.1) | 4.1 (39.4) | 11.6 (52.9) | 16.7 (62.1) | 21.0 (69.8) | 22.8 (73.0) | 21.1 (70.0) | 15.8 (60.4) | 8.9 (48.0) | 1.3 (34.3) | −5.4 (22.3) | 9.0 (48.2) |
| Mean daily minimum °C (°F) | −13.3 (8.1) | −8.9 (16.0) | −2.2 (28.0) | 4.4 (39.9) | 9.3 (48.7) | 13.5 (56.3) | 15.7 (60.3) | 14.7 (58.5) | 9.9 (49.8) | 2.7 (36.9) | −4.7 (23.5) | −10.9 (12.4) | 2.5 (36.5) |
| Record low °C (°F) | −25.3 (−13.5) | −25.0 (−13.0) | −19.3 (−2.7) | −7.7 (18.1) | −3.0 (26.6) | 2.8 (37.0) | 7.2 (45.0) | 4.3 (39.7) | −0.8 (30.6) | −14.4 (6.1) | −22.7 (−8.9) | −32.0 (−25.6) | −32.0 (−25.6) |
| Average precipitation mm (inches) | 2.2 (0.09) | 2.1 (0.08) | 5.7 (0.22) | 9.8 (0.39) | 18.0 (0.71) | 22.5 (0.89) | 34.7 (1.37) | 41.1 (1.62) | 29.1 (1.15) | 10 (0.4) | 3.0 (0.12) | 1.8 (0.07) | 180 (7.11) |
| Average precipitation days (≥ 0.1 mm) | 2.9 | 2.3 | 3.4 | 3.8 | 6.2 | 6.6 | 8.2 | 9.8 | 8.1 | 4.6 | 2.4 | 1.9 | 60.2 |
| Average snowy days | 4.5 | 4.1 | 4.5 | 1.6 | 0.3 | 0 | 0 | 0 | 0 | 1.7 | 3.4 | 3.6 | 23.7 |
| Average relative humidity (%) | 50 | 44 | 40 | 36 | 41 | 47 | 54 | 58 | 61 | 55 | 53 | 54 | 49 |
| Mean monthly sunshine hours | 224.4 | 223.0 | 247.1 | 253.1 | 276.5 | 268.6 | 264.4 | 248.6 | 214.8 | 237.9 | 231.0 | 224.5 | 2,913.9 |
| Percentage possible sunshine | 73 | 73 | 66 | 64 | 63 | 61 | 59 | 60 | 59 | 70 | 77 | 76 | 67 |
Source 1: China Meteorological Administration
Source 2: Weather China

A species of stone loach, Triplophysa wuweiensis, is named after Wuwei where it was first discovered.

== Administration ==
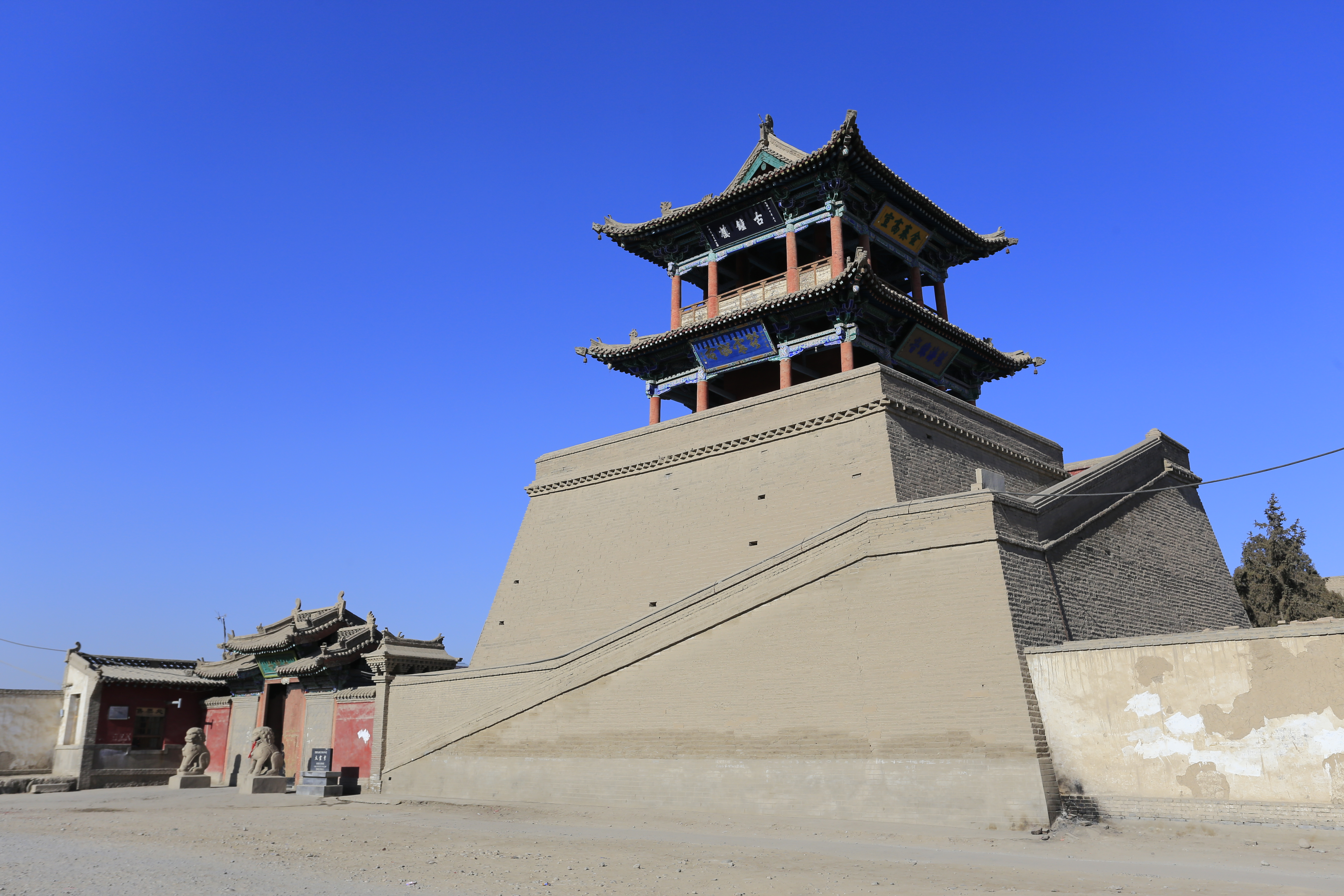
Dayun Temple

1 urban district, 2 counties, 1 autonomous county, 116 towns, and 41 townships

Map
| Name | Hanzi | Hanyu Pinyin | Population (2010) | Area (km^{2}) | Density (/km^{2}) |
|---|---|---|---|---|---|
| Liangzhou District | 凉州区 | Liángzhōu Qū | 1,010,295 | 5,081 | 207.29 |
| Minqin County | 民勤县 | Mínqín Xiàn | 241,251 | 16,016 | 15.2 |
| Gulang County | 古浪县 | Gǔlàng Xiàn | 388,720 | 5,287 | 78.13 |
| Tianzhu Tibetan; Autonomous County | 天祝藏族自治县 | Tiānzhù Zàngzú; Zìzhìxiàn | 174,793 | 6,865 | 25.71 |

== Demographics ==
=== Population overview ===
By 2020, the population reached 1,464,955 with 38 ethnic groups represented including Han, Hui, Mongol, Tu, Tibetan, etc.

| Census | 1st Census (1953) | | 2nd Census (1964) | | 3rd Census (1982) | | 4th Census (1990) | | 5th Census (2000) | |
| County/District | Population | % | Population | % | Population | % | Population | % | Population | % |
|---|---|---|---|---|---|---|---|---|---|---|
| Wuwei/Liangzhou | 510,241 | 28.18 | 520,094 | 33.90 | 763,719 | 46.38 | 876,020 | 52.48 | 946,506 | 51.52 |
| Minqin | 220,022 | 12.15 | 179,061 | 11.67 | 241,510 | 14.67 | 258,947 | 15.51 | 302,085 | 16.45 |
| Gulang | 139,238 | 7.69 | 186,267 | 12.14 | 287,269 | 17.44 | 323,507 | 19.38 | 367,048 | 19.98 |
| Tianzhu | 58,731 | 3.24 | 118,625 | 7.73 | 184,410 | 11.20 | 210,845 | 12.63 | 221,347 | 12.05 |
| Jingtai | 65,518 | 3.62 | 93,862 | 6.12 | 169,858 | 10.31 | Placed under Baiyin since 1985 | | | |
| Yongchang | 125,578 | 6.94 | 174,221 | 11.36 | Placed under Jinchang since 1981 | | | | | |
| Yongdeng | 264,787 | 14.62 | 261,880 | 17.07 | Placed under Lanzhou since 1970 | | | | | |
| Zhangye | 254,900 | 14.08 | Now as Ganzhou District, placed under Zhangye since 1955 | | | | | | | |
| Minle | 106,675 | 5.89 | Placed under Zhangye since 1955 | | | | | | | |
| Shandan | 64,898 | 3.58 | Placed under Zhangye since 1955 | | | | | | | |
| Total | 1,810,588 | | 1,534,010 | | 1,646,766 | | 1,669,319 | | 1,836,923 | |

| Census | 6th Census(2010) | | 7th Census(2020) | |
| County/District | Population | % | Population | % |
|---|---|---|---|---|
| Liangzhou | 174,790 | 9.63 | 885,277 | 60.43 |
| Minqin | 1,010,295 | 55.67 | 178,470 | 12.18 |
| Gulang | 241,251 | 13.29 | 250,177 | 17.07 |
| Tianzhu | 388,718 | 21.41 | 151,031 | 10.32 |
| Total | 1,815,054 | | 1,464,955 | |

=== Urbanization and Gender Structure ===
| National Census | Urban Population | | Male | | Female | | Sex Ratio |
| National Census | Total | Urbanization | Total | % | Total | % | Sex Ratio |
|---|---|---|---|---|---|---|---|
| 5th | 370,008 | 20.14% | 949,435# | 51.69% | 887,488# | 48.31% | 106.98 |
| 6th | 500,528 | 27.56% | 933,482 | 51.43% | 881,572 | 48.57% | 105.89 |
| 7th | 688,697 | 47.01% | 740,306 | 50.53% | 724,649 | 49.47% | 102.16 |
| Observation | #No data, estimated based on the published sex ratio | | | | | | |

=== Education Level ===
| National Census | University Education (including associate degree) | | High School Education | | Secondary Education | | Primary Education | | illiteracy | |
| National Census | Total | % | Total | % | Total | % | Total | % | Total | % |
|---|---|---|---|---|---|---|---|---|---|---|
| 5th | 33,927* | 2.08% | 182,774* | 11.22% | 504,999* | 31.01% | 738,388* | 45.34% | 168,499 | 10.35% |
| 6th | 98,932 | 5.84% | 257,772 | 15.23% | 681,562 | 40.26% | 540,193 | 31.91% | 114,475 | 6.76% |
| 7th | 184,994 | 13.69% | 207,940 | 15.38% | 456,779 | 33.79% | 418,200 | 30.94% | 83,812 | 6.20% |
| Observation | *Estimation, the original data is the number of people educated per 100,000 people. The number of people educated per 100,000 people in universities, high schools, junior high schools, and primary schools is 1847, 9950, 27491, and 40197, respectively | | | | | | | | | |

=== Age distribution and population pyramid ===
The 5th, 6th, and 7th National Census of Wuwei - Gender and Age Structure
| National Census | 7th | | 6th | | 5th | |
| Age Group(years) | Male | Female | Male | Female | Male | Female |
|---|---|---|---|---|---|---|
| 0-4 | 44,485 | 40,263 | 48,981 | 39,046 | 70,504 | 48,496 |
| 5-9 | 46,339 | 40,519 | 53,974 | 41,208 | 100,743 | 84,294 |
| 10-14 | 47,440 | 39,429 | 73,286 | 56,878 | 109,253 | 100,793 |
| 15-19 | 42,418 | 33,600 | 98,852 | 86,983 | 75,924 | 72,156 |
| 20-24 | 31,309 | 29,028 | 81,607 | 82,949 | 50,148 | 50,967 |
| 25-29 | 42,722 | 42,670 | 58,238 | 58,222 | 90,740 | 90,367 |
| 30-34 | 50,031 | 52,066 | 50,724 | 47,871 | 107,026 | 108,502 |
| 35-39 | 42,347 | 42,627 | 86,543 | 86,548 | 85,427 | 86,072 |
| 40-44 | 39,740 | 38,369 | 100,781 | 102,535 | 52,819 | 48,012 |
| 45-49 | 70,821 | 74,010 | 78,779 | 81,645 | 56,282 | 51,909 |
| 50-54 | 83,149 | 87,007 | 48,773 | 44,674 | 42,428 | 41,012 |
| 55-59 | 64,464 | 67,021 | 50,627 | 48,153 | 35,440 | 33,260 |
| 60-64 | 38,398 | 35,821 | 35,973 | 36,379 | 30,846 | 29,633 |
| 65-69 | 40,668 | 40,442 | 28,436 | 28,213 | 22,239 | 22,436 |
| 70-74 | 26,799 | 28,670 | 20,116 | 20,960 | 10,766 | 10,577 |
| 75 or above | 29,176 | 33,107 | 17,797 | 19,308 | 8,466 | 9,449 |

Population Pyramid of Wuwei
The following pictures are based on The 5th, 6th, and 7th National Census of Wuwei - Gender and Age Structure
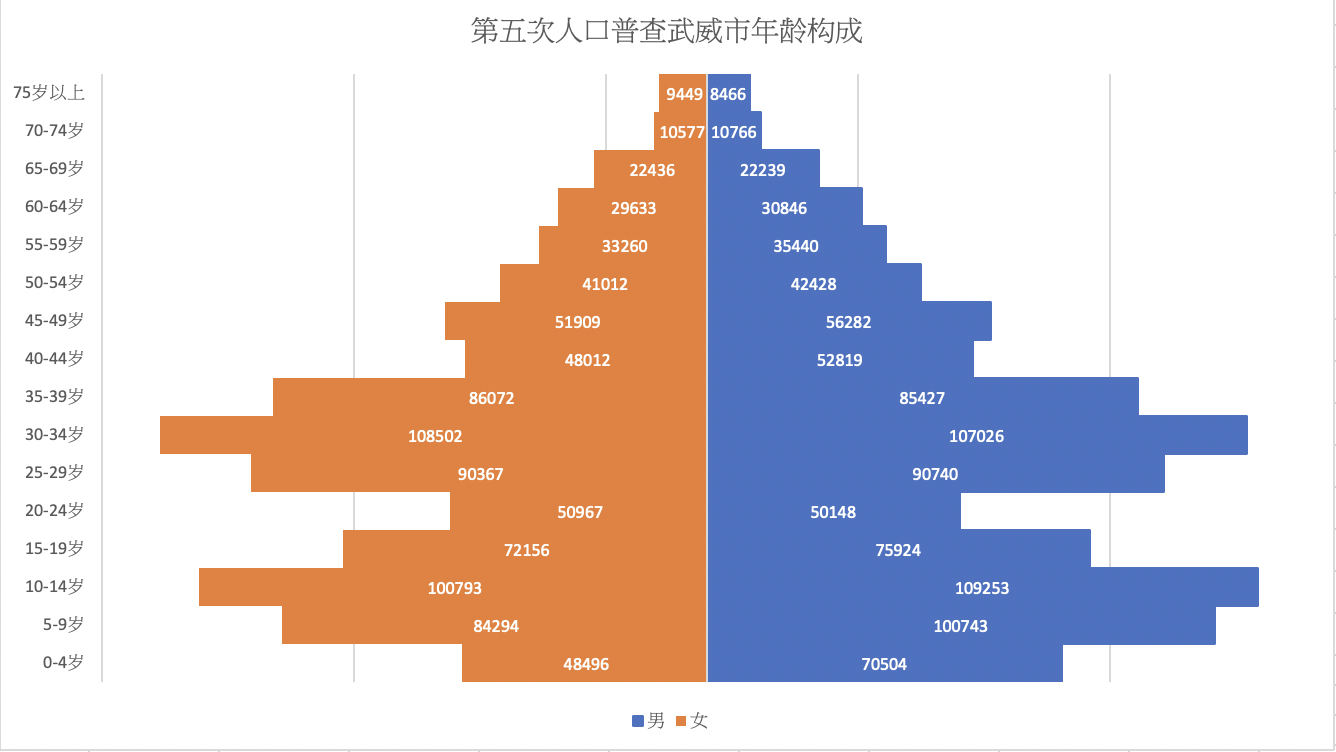
5th Census

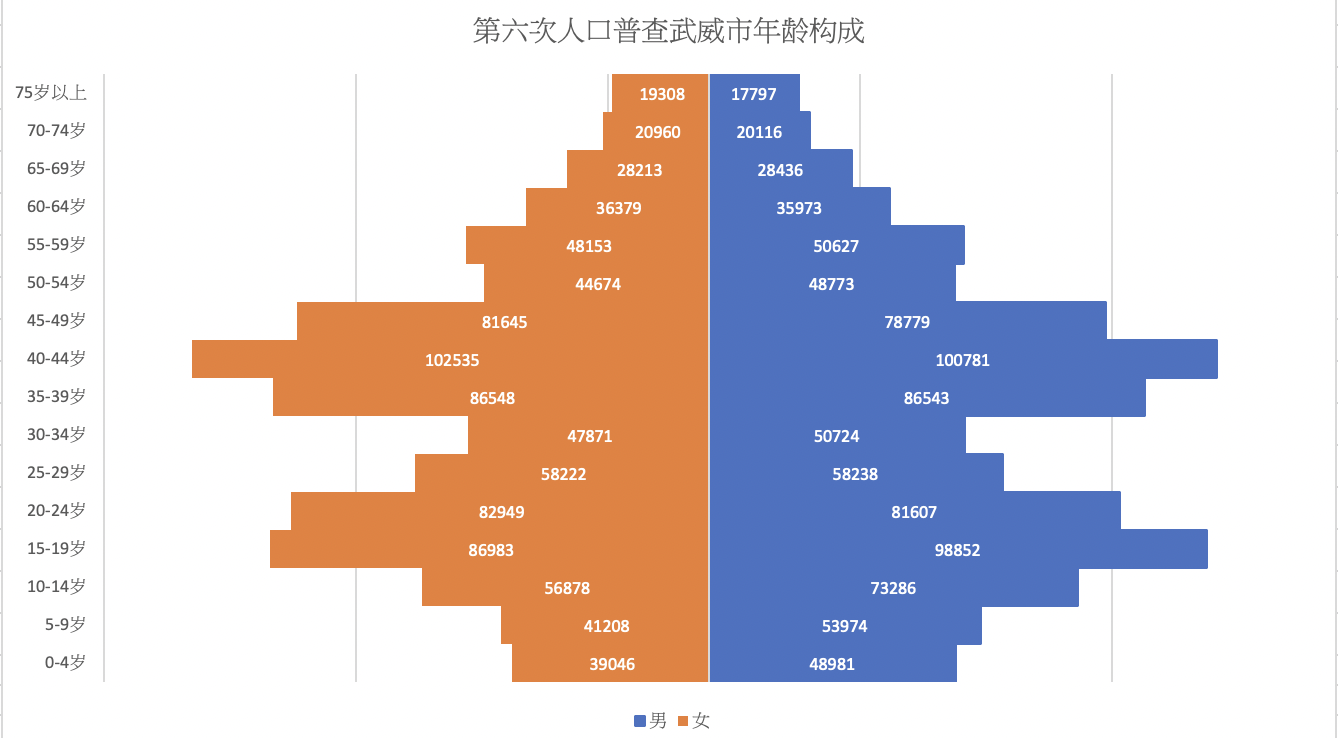
6th Census

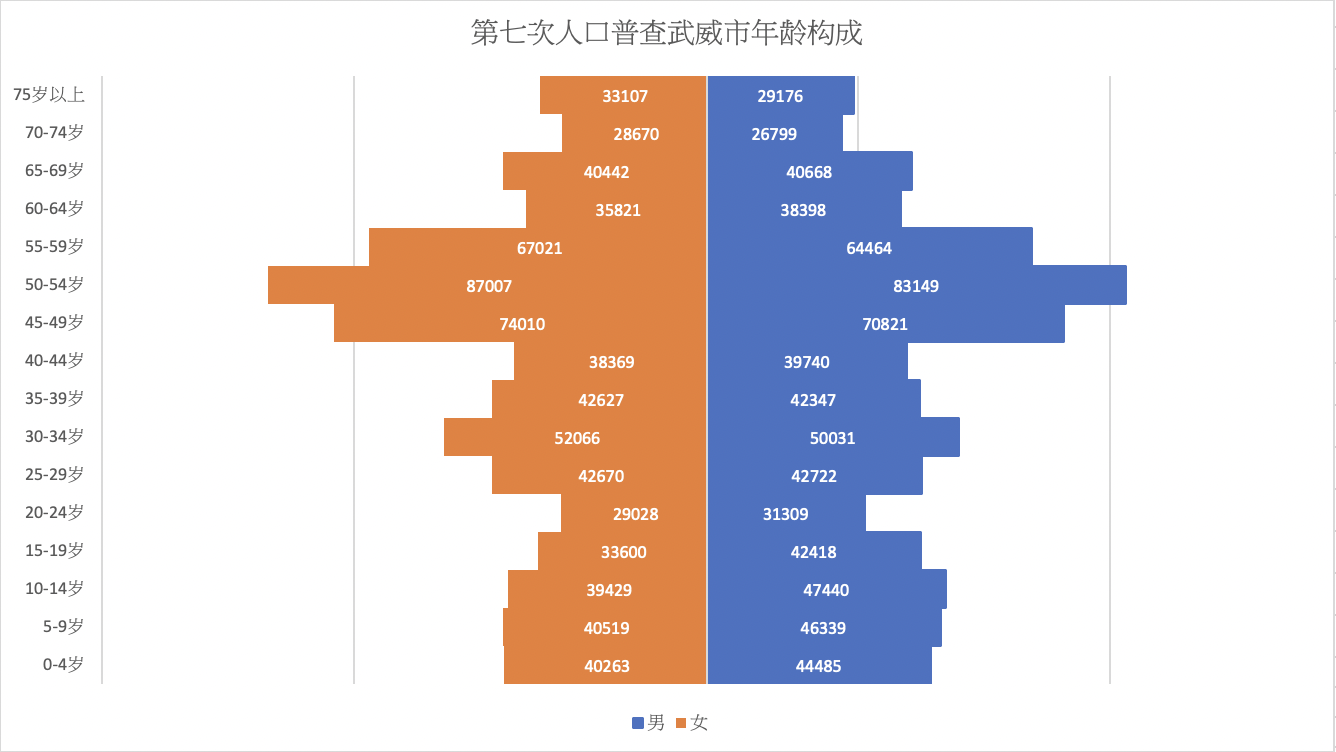
7th Census

=== No. of households ===
| National Census | No. of Household | Population | No. of ppls/household |
|---|---|---|---|
| 5th | No Data | No Data | 3.95 |
| 6th | 467,040 | 1,748,588 | 3.74 |
| 7th | 529,119 | 1,383,397 | 2.61 |

=== Wuwei ethnic population and gender ===
Ethnic Population by County/District（2020）

| County/District | Han | % | Minorities | % |
|---|---|---|---|---|
| Liangzhou District | 870,610 | 98.3% | 14,667 | 1.7% |
| Minqin County | 176,789 | 99.1% | 1,681 | 0.9% |
| Gulang County | 246,503 | 98.5% | 3,674 | 1.5% |
| Tianzhu Tibetan Autonomous County | 89,762 | 59.4% | 61,269 | 40.6% |
| Wuwei | 1,383,664 | 94.5% | 81,291 | 5.5% |

Gender data by ethnicity (2020)

| County/District | Male (Han) | Female (Han) | Sex Ratio (Han) | Male (Minorities) | Female (Minorities) | Sex Ratio (Minorities) |
|---|---|---|---|---|---|---|
| Liangzhou District | 438,898 | 431,712 | 101.7 | 7,620 | 7,047 | 108.1 |
| Minqin County | 90,394 | 86,395 | 104.6 | 915 | 766 | 119.5 |
| Gulang County | 123,481 | 123,022 | 100.4 | 1,706 | 1,968 | 86.7 |
| Tianzhu Tibetan Autonomous County | 46,638 | 43,124 | 108.1 | 30,654 | 30,615 | 100.1 |
| Wuwei | 699,411 | 684,253 | 102.2 | 40,895 | 40,396 | 101.2 |

=== Birth rate, mortality rate, and natural growth rate in Wuwei ===
| Legend | ↑Natural growth rate increased compared to the previous year ↓Natural growth rate decreased compared to the previous year *There is currently no data available |

| Year | Birth Rate(‰) | Mortality Rate(‰) | Natural Growth Rate(‰) | Trend of Three Rates |
|---|---|---|---|---|
| 2000 | 13.33 | 5.57 | 7.76 | Green Line: Birth Rate Red Line: Mortality Rate; Grey Line: Natural Growth Rate |
| 2001 | 11.97 | 5.21 | 6.76↓ | Green Line: Birth Rate Red Line: Mortality Rate; Grey Line: Natural Growth Rate |
| 2002 | * | * | 6.28↓ | Green Line: Birth Rate Red Line: Mortality Rate; Grey Line: Natural Growth Rate |
| 2003 | * | * | 5.59↓ | Green Line: Birth Rate Red Line: Mortality Rate; Grey Line: Natural Growth Rate |
| 2004 | * | * | 5.61↓ | Green Line: Birth Rate Red Line: Mortality Rate; Grey Line: Natural Growth Rate |
| 2005 | * | * | 5.81↑ | Green Line: Birth Rate Red Line: Mortality Rate; Grey Line: Natural Growth Rate |
| 2006 | * | * | 6.29↑ | Green Line: Birth Rate Red Line: Mortality Rate; Grey Line: Natural Growth Rate |
| 2007 | * | * | 6.43↑ | Green Line: Birth Rate Red Line: Mortality Rate; Grey Line: Natural Growth Rate |
| 2008 | * | * | 6.69↑ | Green Line: Birth Rate Red Line: Mortality Rate; Grey Line: Natural Growth Rate |
| 2009 | * | * | 6.69 | Green Line: Birth Rate Red Line: Mortality Rate; Grey Line: Natural Growth Rate |
| 2010 | * | * | 5.36↓ | Green Line: Birth Rate Red Line: Mortality Rate; Grey Line: Natural Growth Rate |
| 2011 | * | * | 5.28↓ | Green Line: Birth Rate Red Line: Mortality Rate; Grey Line: Natural Growth Rate |
| 2012 | 10.52 | 5.23 | 5.29↓ | Green Line: Birth Rate Red Line: Mortality Rate; Grey Line: Natural Growth Rate |
| 2013 | 10.57 | 5.26 | 5.31↑ | Green Line: Birth Rate Red Line: Mortality Rate; Grey Line: Natural Growth Rate |
| 2014 | 10.61 | 5.28 | 5.33↑ | Green Line: Birth Rate Red Line: Mortality Rate; Grey Line: Natural Growth Rate |
| 2015 | 10.81 | 5.31 | 5.50↑ | Green Line: Birth Rate Red Line: Mortality Rate; Grey Line: Natural Growth Rate |
| 2016 | 10.83 | 5.81 | 5.02↓ | Green Line: Birth Rate Red Line: Mortality Rate; Grey Line: Natural Growth Rate |
| 2017 | 11.38 | 6.22 | 5.16↑ | Green Line: Birth Rate Red Line: Mortality Rate; Grey Line: Natural Growth Rate |
| 2018 | 9.42 | 6.18 | 3.24↓ | Green Line: Birth Rate Red Line: Mortality Rate; Grey Line: Natural Growth Rate |
| 2019 | 9.21 | 6.32 | 2.89↓ | Green Line: Birth Rate Red Line: Mortality Rate; Grey Line: Natural Growth Rate |
| 2020 | * | * | -2.12↓ | Green Line: Birth Rate Red Line: Mortality Rate; Grey Line: Natural Growth Rate |
| 2021 | 8.93 | 10.21 | -1.98↑ | Green Line: Birth Rate Red Line: Mortality Rate; Grey Line: Natural Growth Rate |
| 2022 | 7.84 | 10.55 | -2.72↓ | Green Line: Birth Rate Red Line: Mortality Rate; Grey Line: Natural Growth Rate |
| 2023(Expected) | 8.09 | 10.43 | -2.35↑ | Green Line: Birth Rate Red Line: Mortality Rate; Grey Line: Natural Growth Rate |
| 2028(Expected) | 6.63 | 13.32 | -6.70 | Green Line: Birth Rate Red Line: Mortality Rate; Grey Line: Natural Growth Rate |

== Economy ==
Consistent sunlight and fertile soil make agriculture one of Wuwei's biggest industries. Other important industries are textiles, metallurgy, and construction materials. Melons, vegetables, wine and livestock are all major agricultural products. Organic farming is a trend with more land being set aside for “green farming” each year. Land use can be broken down into the following:

- 790 square kilometres (310 sq mi) of water
- 34,800 square kilometres (13,400 sq mi) of forest
- 355,300 square kilometres (137,200 sq mi) of grassland.
- 247,000 square kilometres (95,000 sq mi) of “undeveloped” land.
- 39,100 square kilometres (15,100 sq mi) of farmland.
  - 8,000 square kilometres (3,100 sq mi) of corn
  - 4,000 square kilometres (1,500 sq mi) of vegetables
  - 3,000 square kilometres (1,200 sq mi) of melons
  - 5,000 square kilometres (1,900 sq mi) for livestock
  - 800 square kilometres (310 sq mi) of vineyards

== Transport ==
=== Railway ===
There are two railway lines that pass through Wuwei, namely the Lanzhou-Xinjiang Railway and the Gantang-Wuwei Railway. Both are east–west railway lines. Since there are no north–south railway lines crossing Wuwei, there are no railway lines passing through Minqin County which lies in the northern part of Wuwei, therefore, there are no railway stations in Minqin.

There exist various railway stations in Liangzhou District, Gulang County and Tianzhu Tibetan Autonomous County. Wuwei Railway Station (second-class station) is the largest train station in terms of passenger traffic in Wuwei. It is located 303 kilometers east of Lanzhou Station and 1,589 kilometers west of Ürümqi Railway Station.

==== Railway stations in Wuwei ====
Pictures

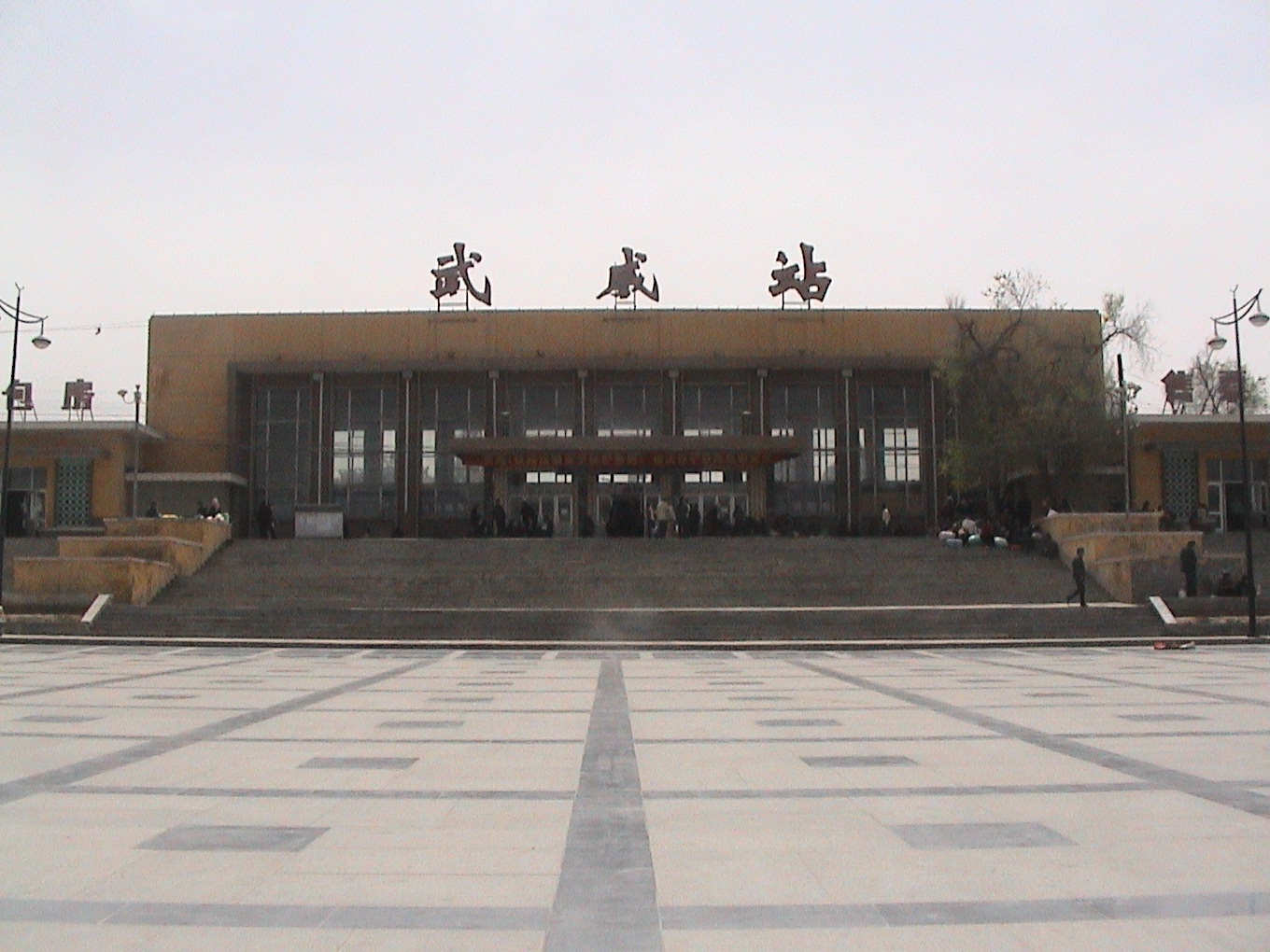
Wuwei Railway Station before rebuild

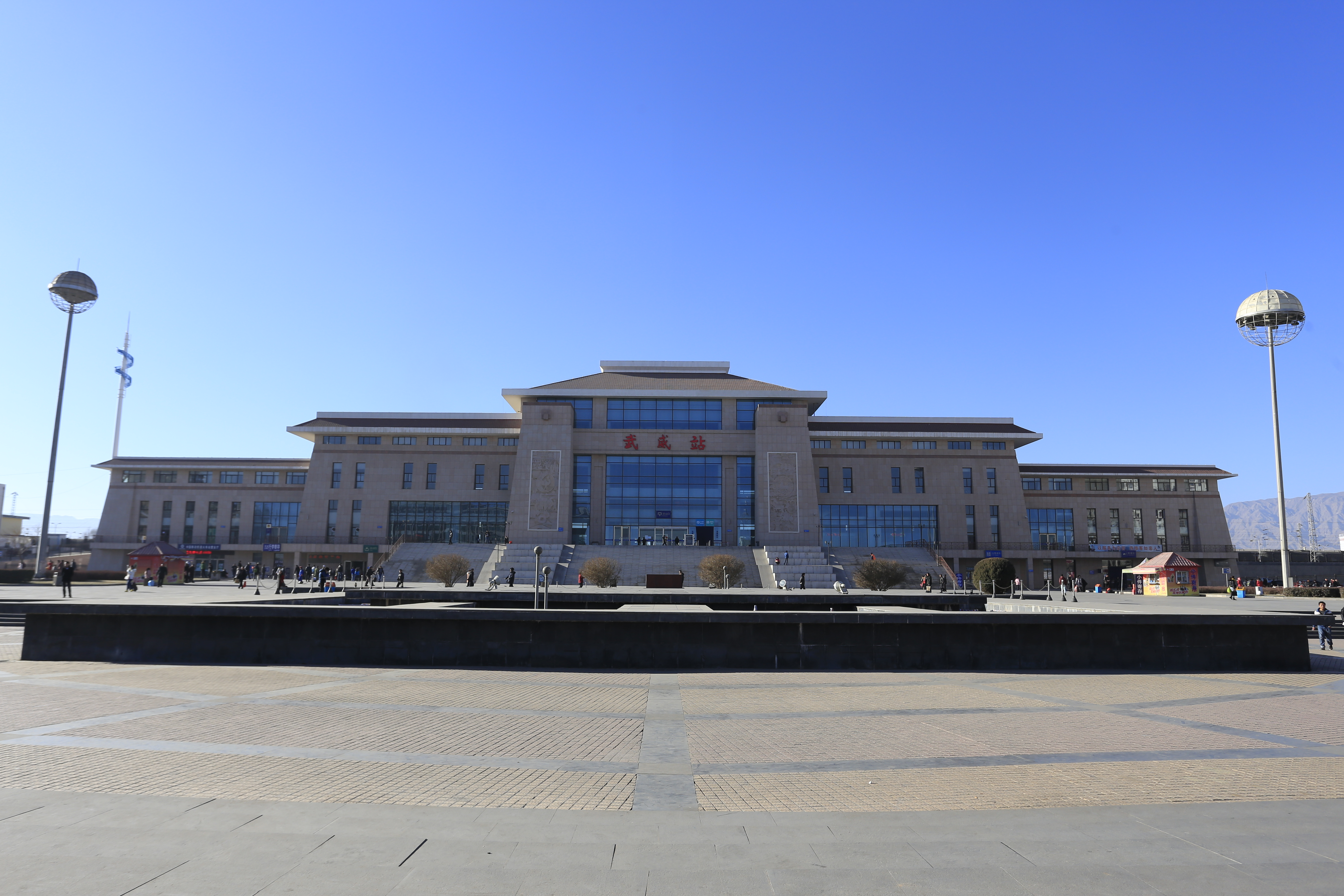
Wuwei Railway Station after rebuild

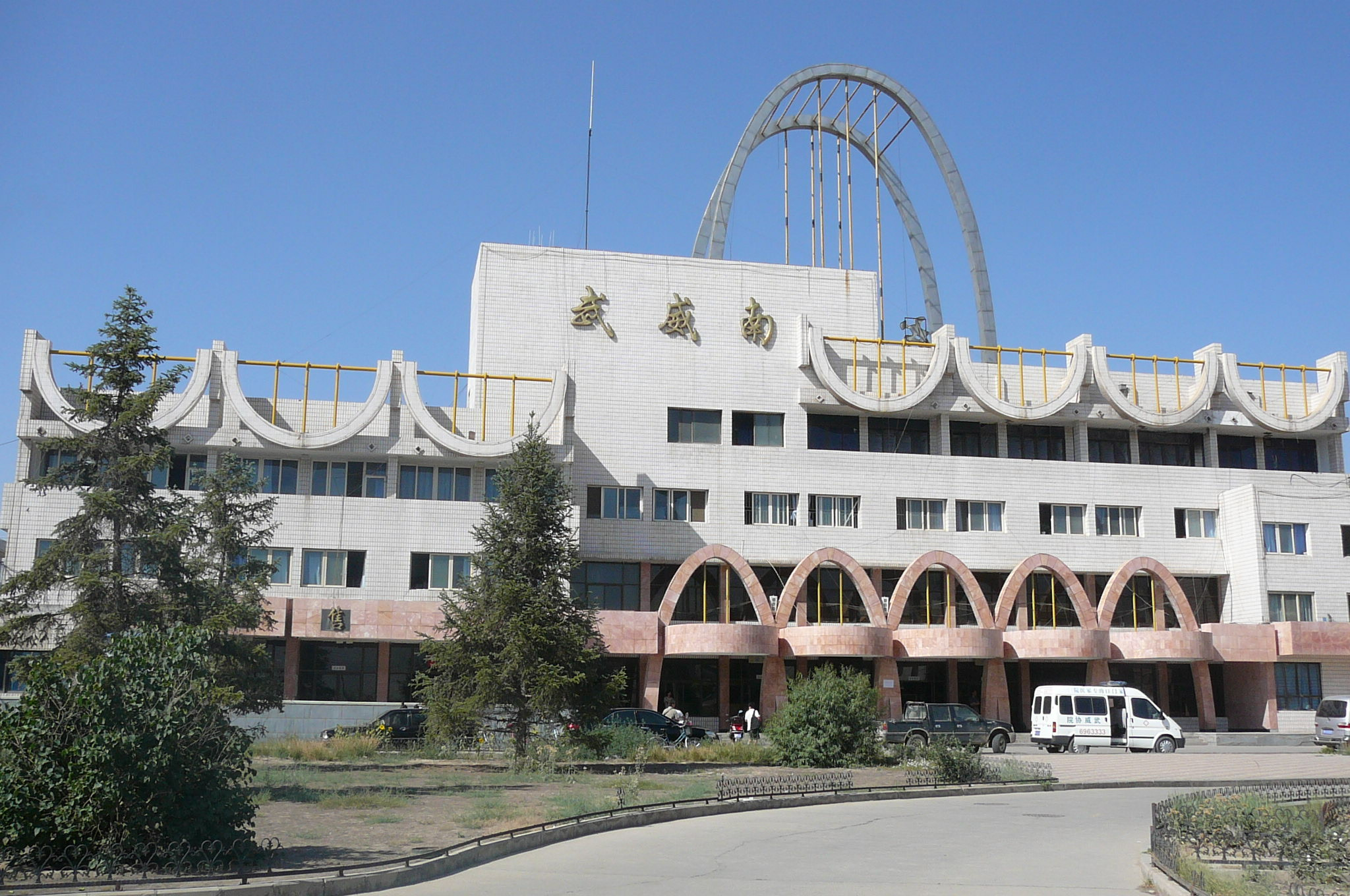
Wuwei South Railway Station

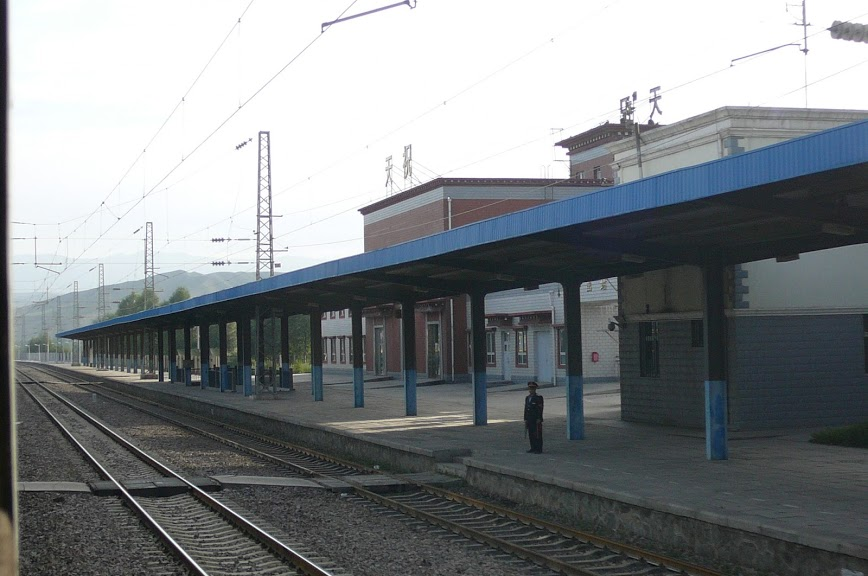
Platform, Tianzhu Railway Station

Major Railway Stations in Wuwei
| Station | County/District | Station Class | Railways | Available for |
|---|---|---|---|---|
| Wuwei Railway Station | Liangzhou | Second | Lanzhou-Xinjiang Railway, Gantang-Wuwei Railway | Passenger, Package, Luggage |
| Wuwei S. Railway Station | Liangzhou | First | Lanzhou-Xinjiang Railway, Gantang-Wuwei Railway | Passenger |
| Wuwei E. Railway Station (High Speed Railway) | Liangzhou | Second | Lanzhou-Zhangye High Speed Railway | Passenger |
| Gulang Railway Station | Gulang | Fourth | Lanzhou-Xinjiang Railway | Passenger |
| Gulang N. Railway Station (High Speed Railway) | Gulang | - | Lanzhou-Zhangye High Speed Railway | Passenger |
| Tianzhu Railway Station | Tianzhu | Third | Lanzhou-Xinjiang Railway | Passenger |
| Tianzhu W. Railway Station (High Speed Railway) | Tianzhu | - | Lanzhou-Zhangye High Speed Railway | Passenger |

=== Highways ===
| Category | English name Chinese Name | Code | Service Level |
|---|---|---|---|
| National Expressways | Lianhuo Expressway 连霍高速 | G30连霍高速标志 | In Service |
| National Expressways | Wujin Expressway 武金高速 | G3017武威至金昌高速标志 | In Service |
| National Expressways | Dingwu Expressway 定武高速 | | In Service |
| Provincial Expressways | Wuwei Ring Expressway 武威绕城高速 | | In Service |
| Provincial Expressways | Beixian Expressway 北仙高速 | | In Service |
| Provincial Expressways | Minhong Expressway 民红高速 | | In Service |
| Provincial Expressways | Leixi Expressway 雷西高速 | | Under Construction |
| National Highways | G312 National Highway G312 国道 | G312 | In Service |
| National Highways | Manda Highway G569 曼大公路 | G569 | Under Construction |
| National Highways | Dingwu Highway G667 武定公路 | G667 | In Service |
