= Shiyang River =

River in People's Republic of China

The Shiyang River (石羊河), previously called the Gu River (谷水), flows through the eastern Hexi Corridor in China.

The catchment area of the Shiyang River covers about 41,600 km^{2}, most of which lies within today's Wuwei prefecture-level city of the Gansu Province. The river originates from the Qilian Mountains, and flows north-east, toward the Gobi Desert. The Wuqiaoling Range (乌鞘岭), in Tenzhu Tibetan Autonomous County, forms the dividing ridge between the endorheic Shiyang River catchment in the north and the exorheic Yellow River catchment in the south.

In the Tang dynasty, the Baiting Lake (白亭海) was one of the terminal lakes of Shiyang River. However, the Baiting Lake has dried up and the modern terminal lake of Shiyang River is the Qingtu Lake (青土湖).

Agricultural oases are distributed in the Shiyang River catchment, with Wuwei being the main city of this region. Reservoirs have been constructed for the purposes of irrigation and flood prevention. There were 24 reservoirs in the Shiyang River Basin as of 2000. The population in the Shiyang River catchment was about 2 268 900 as of 2003. Currently people in this region are facing problems of overdevelopment and desertification.

In the lower reaches of Shiyang River is the Minqin Oasis, which is surrounded by the Tengger Desert (腾格里沙漠) in the east and the Badain Jaran Desert (巴丹吉林沙漠) in the west. Currently efforts are being made to prevent the desertification and disappearance of the Minqin Oasis.
