= Arach =

Arach may be:

- an abbreviation for the Arachnis genus of plants
- a phonetic spelling of either:
  - Araç, a town in Turkey
  - Arač, former name of Novi Bečej, a town in Serbia

== See also ==
- Arrach, a municipality of Germany
