= Wushao Mountain =

Mountain in Gansu, China

- Wushaoling
- Location within Gansu Location within Qinghai Location within China

Highest point
- Elevation: 3,562 m (11,686 ft)
- Coordinates: 37°11′00″N 102°53′02″E

Naming
- Native name: 乌鞘岭 (Chinese)

Geography
- Country: China
- Province: Gansu

Wushao Mountain, Wushao Ling Mountain or Wushaoling (simplified Chinese: 乌鞘岭; traditional Chinese: 烏鞘嶺; pinyin: Wūshāolǐng) is a landform in Gansu Province, China, with significant desert elements on its northern slope.

The mountain has been a barrier to transportation since ancient times, when the Northern Silk Road found a passage across its terrain. The western slope of Wushao Ling combined with adjoining slopes of Lanshan Mountain comprises over 30 percent of the desert area of China. Given the current trend in China's land use policies, desertification of the Wushao Ling slopes and other Chinese deserts is projected to expand.

The mountain range is crossed by:

- China National Highway 312, through the Wushaoling Pass (3030 m)
- G30 Lianyungang–Khorgas Expressway, through a tunnel
- Lanzhou–Xinjiang high-speed railway, through the Wushaoling Tunnel (21.05 km)

== Climate ==
Mount Wushao has a subarctic climate (Köppen climate classification Dwc). The average annual temperature in Mount Wushao is 0.3 °C (32.5 °F). The average annual rainfall is 407.3 mm (16.04 in) with July as the wettest month. The temperatures are highest on average in July, at around 11.8 °C (53.2 °F), and lowest in January, at around −11.3 °C (11.7 °F).

Climate data for Mount Wushao (1981−2010 normals, extremes 1981−2010)
Month	Jan	Feb	Mar	Apr	May	Jun	Jul	Aug	Sep	Oct	Nov	Dec	Year
Record high °C (°F)	9.9 (49.8)	13.9 (57.0)	18.7 (65.7)	22.0 (71.6)	22.1 (71.8)	23.2 (73.8)	28.1 (82.6)	24.6 (76.3)	22.3 (72.1)	19.0 (66.2)	13.1 (55.6)	9.9 (49.8)	28.1 (82.6)
Mean daily maximum °C (°F)	−4.9 (23.2)	−3.2 (26.2)	0.5 (32.9)	6.3 (43.3)	11.0 (51.8)	14.6 (58.3)	16.7 (62.1)	15.8 (60.4)	11.6 (52.9)	6.2 (43.2)	1.1 (34.0)	−3.1 (26.4)	6.1 (42.9)
Daily mean °C (°F)	−11.3 (11.7)	−9.7 (14.5)	−5.5 (22.1)	0.4 (32.7)	5.5 (41.9)	9.6 (49.3)	11.8 (53.2)	10.6 (51.1)	6.4 (43.5)	0.6 (33.1)	−5.1 (22.8)	−9.4 (15.1)	0.3 (32.6)
Mean daily minimum °C (°F)	−16.1 (3.0)	−14.4 (6.1)	−9.8 (14.4)	−4.0 (24.8)	0.9 (33.6)	5.1 (41.2)	7.5 (45.5)	6.5 (43.7)	2.7 (36.9)	−3.2 (26.2)	−9.6 (14.7)	−14.3 (6.3)	−4.1 (24.7)
Record low °C (°F)	−28.1 (−18.6)	−25.5 (−13.9)	−25.1 (−13.2)	−16.4 (2.5)	−13.7 (7.3)	−3.1 (26.4)	1.5 (34.7)	−1.1 (30.0)	−6.8 (19.8)	−19.4 (−2.9)	−23.8 (−10.8)	−30.7 (−23.3)	−30.7 (−23.3)
Average precipitation mm (inches)	2.6 (0.10)	4.8 (0.19)	12.2 (0.48)	18.1 (0.71)	42.0 (1.65)	64.1 (2.52)	85.9 (3.38)	89.0 (3.50)	61.2 (2.41)	21.9 (0.86)	3.8 (0.15)	1.7 (0.07)	407.3 (16.02)
Average relative humidity (%)	48	53	57	54	57	61	68	71	71	65	50	45	58
Source: China Meteorological Data Service Center
