= Liangzhou, Wuwei =

Liangzhou 凉州区
- District
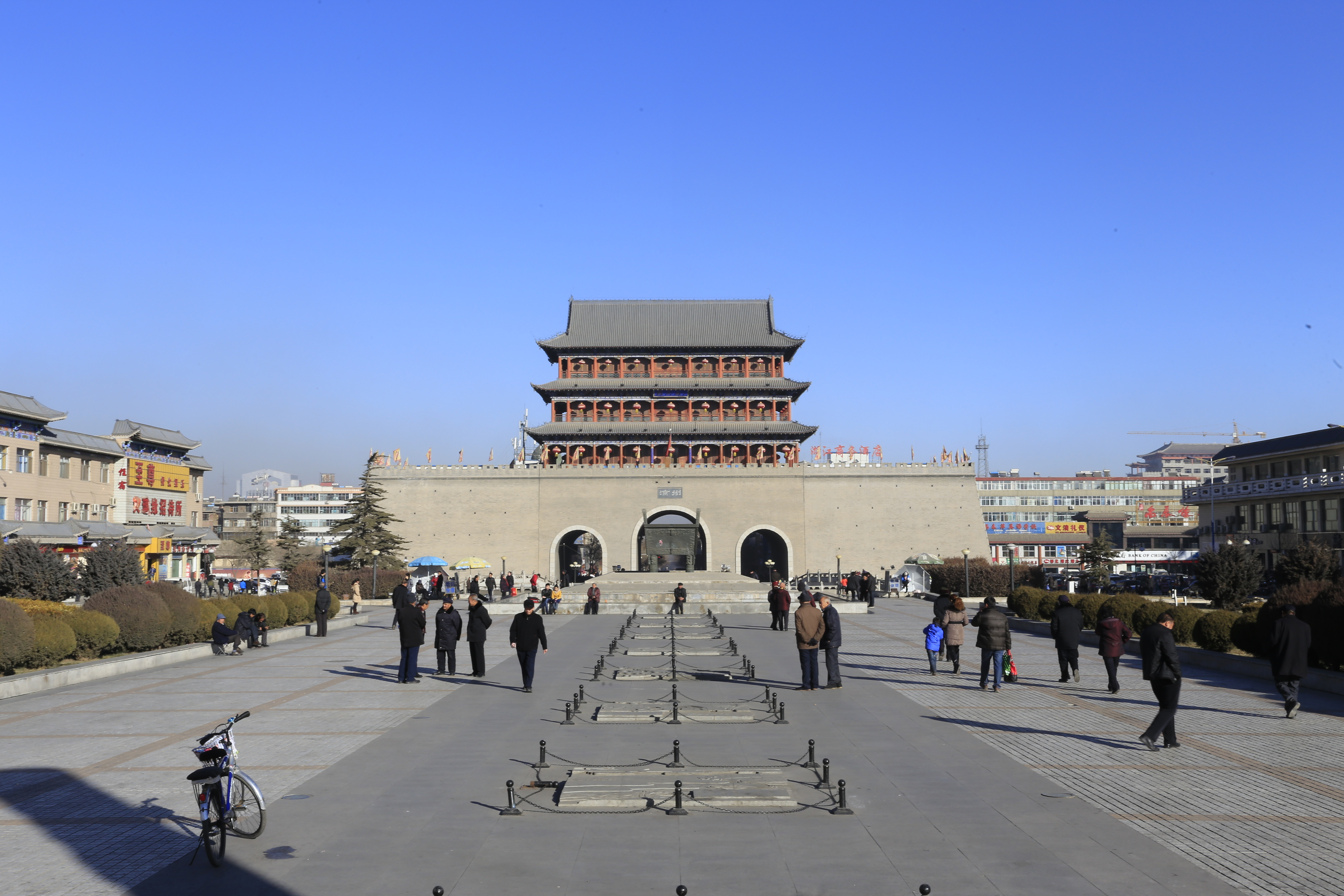
- Wuwei South Gate

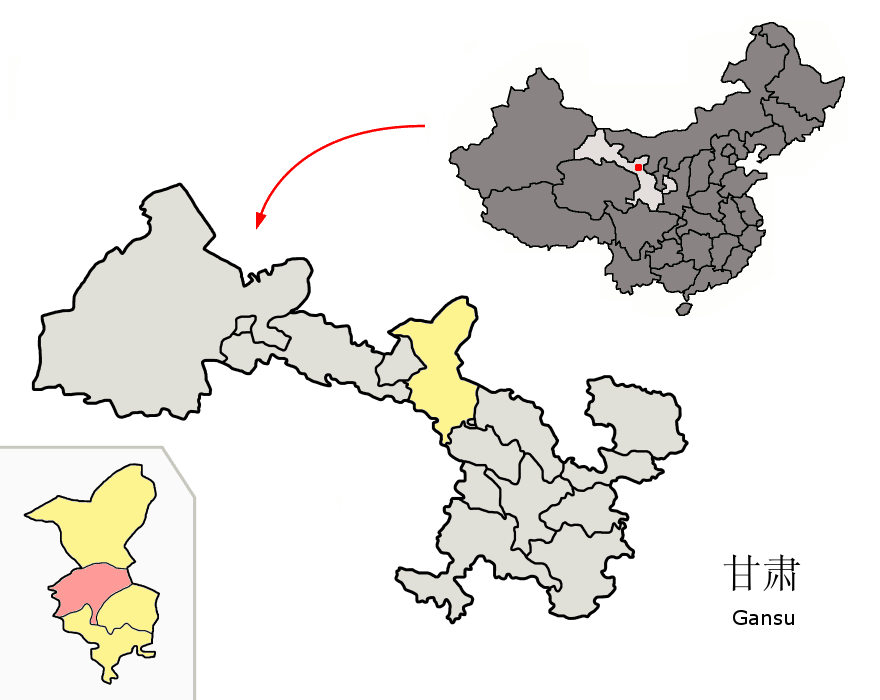
- Liangzhou District (red) in Wuwei City (yellow) and Gansu

- Location in Gansu
- Coordinates: 37°55′42″N 102°38′31″E
- Country: China
- Province: Gansu
- Prefecture-level city: Wuwei
- District seat: Dongdajie Subdistrict

Area
  - Total: 5,081 km^{2} (1,962 sq mi)

Population (2020)
  - Total: 885,277
  - Density: 174.2/km^{2} (451.3/sq mi)
- Time zone: UTC+8 (China Standard)
- Postal code: 733000
- Website: www.gsliangzhou.gov.cn

Liangzhou District (simplified Chinese: 凉州区; traditional Chinese: 涼州區; pinyin: Liángzhōu Qū) is a district and the seat of the city of Wuwei, Gansu province, China, bordering Inner Mongolia to the east.

== Geography ==
Liangzhou District is located in the eastern part of the Hexi Corridor, north of the Qilian Mountains. It can be divided geographically into three main areas: the Qilian Mountains in the southwest, the Hexi Corridor in the center, and the Alashan Plateau semi-desert in the northeast. Liangzhou District is an agricultural oasis located in the Shiyang River (石羊河) catchment area.

== Administrative divisions ==
Liangzhou District is divided to 9 subdistricts, 37 towns and 2 others.

Subdistricts

- Dongdajie Subdistrict (东大街街道)
- Xidajie Subdistrict (西大街街道)
- Dongguanjie Subdistrict (东关街街道)
- Xiguanjie Subdistrict (西关街街道)
- Huochezhanjie Subdistrict (火车站街街道)
- Dizhixincunjie Subdistrict (地质新村街街道)
- Ronghuajie Subdistrict (荣华街街道)
- Xuanwujie Subdistrict (宣武街街道)
- Huangyanghe Subdistrict (黄羊河街道)

Towns

- Huangyang (黄羊镇)
- Wunan (武南镇)
- Qingyuan (清源镇)
- Yongchang (永昌镇)
- Shuangcheng (双城镇)
- Fengle (丰乐镇)
- Gaoba (高坝镇)
- Jinyang (金羊镇)
- Heping (和平镇)
- Yangxiaba (羊下坝镇)
- Zhongba (中坝镇)
- Yongfeng (永丰镇)
- Gucheng (古城镇)
- Zhangyi (张义镇)
- Fafang (发放镇)
- Xiying (西营镇)
- Siba (四坝镇)
- Hongxiang (洪祥镇)
- Xiehe (谢河镇)
- Jinsha (金沙镇)
- Songshu (松树镇)
- Huai'an (怀安镇)
- Xiashuang (下双镇)
- Qingshui (清水镇)
- Hedong (河东镇)
- Wuhe (五和镇)
- Changcheng (长城镇)
- Wujiajing (吴家井镇)
- Jinhe (金河镇)
- Hanzuo (韩佐镇)
- Daliu (大柳镇)
- Boshu (柏树镇)
- Jinta (金塔镇)
- Jiudun (九墩镇)
- Jinshan (金山镇)
- Xinhua (新华镇)
- Kangning (康宁镇)

Others

- Jiuduntan Headquarters (九墩滩指挥部)
- Dengmaying Lake Ecological Construction Headquarters (邓马营湖生态建设指挥部)

== See also ==
- List of administrative divisions of Gansu
- Wang Wei (Tang dynasty)
