= List of Turkic languages =

The Turkic languages are a group of languages spoken across Central Asia, West Asia, North Asia as well as Eastern Europe. Turkic languages are spoken as native languages by some 200 million people.

== Turkic languages by subfamily ==
The number of speakers derived from statistics or estimates (2022) and were rounded:

Number	Branch	Languages	Status	Native Speakers	Majority	Main Writing System
1	Oghuz languages	8	Normal	121,000,000	Turkey	Latin
2	Karluk languages	4	Normal	43,500,000	Uzbekistan	Latin
3	Kipchak languages	12	Normal	27,000,000	Kazakhstan	Cyrillic
4	Siberian Turkic languages	9	Vulnerable	800,000	Russia	Cyrillic
5	Argu languages	1	Vulnerable	50,000	Iran	Persian
6	Oghuric languages	1	Vulnerable	1,200,000	Russia	Cyrillic
Total	Turkic languages	35	Normal	193,800,000	Turkey	Latin

== Turkic languages by the number of speakers ==
The Turkic languages are a language family of at least 35 documented languages, spoken by the Turkic peoples. The number of speakers derived from statistics or estimates (2019) and were rounded:

1. Turkish (42.9%)
2. Azerbaijani (17.0%)
3. Uzbek (13.9%)
4. Kazakh (7.22%)
5. Uyghur (5.68%)
6. Turkmen (3.61%)
7. Tatar (2.84%)
8. Kyrgyz (2.58%)
9. Bashkir (0.77%)
10. Chuvash (0.62%)
11. Qashqai (0.52%)
12. Khorasani Turkic (0.52%)
13. Other (1.82%)

Number	Name	Branch	Status	Native Speakers	Main Country	Main Writing System
1	Turkish language	Oghuz languages	Normal	83,000,000	Turkey	Latin
2	Uzbek language	Karluk languages	Normal	32,000,000	Uzbekistan	Latin
3	Azerbaijani language	Oghuz languages	Normal	30,000,000	Azerbaijan	Latin
4	Kazakh language	Kipchak languages	Normal	19,000,000	Kazakhstan	Cyrillic
5	Uyghur language	Karluk languages	Normal	13,000,000	China	Perso-Arabic
6	Turkmen language	Oghuz languages	Normal	7,000,000	Turkmenistan	Latin
7	Tatar language	Kipchak languages	Normal	5,500,000	Russia	Cyrillic
8	Kyrgyz language	Kipchak languages	Normal	5,000,000	Kyrgyzstan	Cyrillic
9	Bashkir language	Kipchak languages	Vulnerable	1,500,000	Russia	Cyrillic
10	Chuvash language	Oghuric languages	Vulnerable	1,200,000	Russia	Cyrillic
11	Qashqai language	Oghuz languages	Normal	1,000,000	Iran	Perso-Arabic
12	Khorasani Turkic language	Oghuz languages	Vulnerable	1,000,000	Iran	Perso-Arabic
13	Karakalpak language	Kipchak languages	Normal	650,000	Uzbekistan	Latin
14	Crimean Tatar language	Kipchak languages	Severely endangered	600,000	Ukraine	Latin
15	Kumyk language	Kipchak languages	Vulnerable	450,000	Russia	Cyrillic
16	Karachay-Balkar language	Kipchak languages	Vulnerable	400,000	Russia	Cyrillic
17	Yakut language	Siberian Turkic languages	Vulnerable	400,000	Russia	Cyrillic
18	Tuvan language	Siberian Turkic languages	Vulnerable	300,000	Russia	Cyrillic
19	Urum language	Kipchak languages	Definitely endangered	200,000	Ukraine	Cyrillic
20	Gagauz language	Oghuz languages	Critically endangered	150,000	Moldova	Latin
21	Siberian Tatar language	Kipchak languages	Definitely endangered	100,000	Russia	Cyrillic
22	Nogai language	Kipchak languages	Definitely endangered	100,000	Russia	Cyrillic
23	Dobrujan Tatar language	Kipchak languages	Severely endangered	70,000	Romania	Latin
24	Salar language	Oghuz languages	Vulnerable	70,000	China	Latin
25	Altai languages	Siberian Turkic languages	Severely endangered	60,000	Russia	Cyrillic
26	Khakas language	Siberian Turkic languages	Definitely endangered	50,000	Russia	Cyrillic
27	Khalaj language	Argu languages	Vulnerable	20,000	Iran	Perso-Arabic
28	Äynu language	Karluk languages	Critically endangered	6,000	China	Perso-Arabic
29	Western Yugur language	Siberian Turkic languages	Severely endangered	5,000	China	Latin
30	Shor language	Siberian Turkic languages	Severely endangered	3,000	Russia	Cyrillic
31	Dolgan language	Siberian Turkic languages	Definitely endangered	1,000	Russia	Cyrillic
32	Krymchak language	Kipchak languages	Critically endangered	200	Israel	Hebrew
33	Ili Turki language	Karluk languages	Severely endangered	100	China	Cyrillic
34	Tofa language	Siberian Turkic languages	Critically endangered	100	Russia	Cyrillic
35	Karaim language	Kipchak languages	Critically endangered	100	Ukraine	Cyrillic
36	Chulym language	Siberian Turkic languages	Critically endangered	50	Russia	Cyrillic
Total	Turkic languages	Common Turkic languages	Normal	193,700,000	Turkey	Latin

== Endangered Turkic languages ==
An endangered language, or moribund language, is a language that is at risk of falling out of use as its speakers die out or shift to speaking another language. Language loss occurs when the language has no more native speakers and becomes a "dead language".

26 endangered Turkic languages exist in World. The number of speakers derived from statistics or estimates (2019) and were rounded:

Number	Name	Status	Speakers	Main Country
1	Bashkir language	Vulnerable	1,500,000	Russia
2	Chuvash language	Vulnerable	1,200,000	Russia
3	Khorasani Turkic language	Vulnerable	1,000,000	Iran
4	Crimean Tatar language	Vulnerable	600,000	Ukraine
5	Kumyk language	Vulnerable	450,000	Russia
6	Yakut language	Vulnerable	400,000	Russia
7	Karachay-Balkar language	Vulnerable	400,000	Russia
8	Tuvan language	Vulnerable	300,000	Russia
9	Urum language	Definitely endangered	200,000	Ukraine
10	Gagauz language	Critically endangered	150,000	Moldova
11	Siberian Tatar language	Definitely endangered	100,000	Russia
12	Nogai language	Definitely endangered	100,000	Russia
13	Dobrujan Tatar language	Severely endangered	70,000	Romania
14	Salar language	Vulnerable	70,000	China
15	Altai language	Severely endangered	60,000	Russia
16	Khakas language	Definitely endangered	50,000	Russia
17	Khalaj language	Vulnerable	20,000	Iran
18	Äynu language	Critically endangered	6,000	China
19	Western Yugur language	Severely endangered	5,000	China
20	Shor language	Severely endangered	3,000	Russia
21	Dolgan language	Definitely endangered	1,000	Russia
22	Krymchak language	Critically endangered	200	Israel
23	Tofa language	Critically endangered	100	Russia
24	Karaim language	Critically endangered	100	Ukraine
25	Ili Turki language	Severely endangered	100	China
26	Chulym language	Critically endangered	50	Russia

== Extinct Turkic languages ==
Number	Name	Time of Extinct
-	Proto Turkic	Reconstructed language
1	Old Turkic	8th century
2	Old Anatolian Turkish	11th century
3	Pecheneg	12th century
4	Orkhon Turkic	13th century
5	Khazar	13th century
6	Old Uyghur	14th century
7	Khorezmian	14th century
8	Bulgar	14th century
9	Middle Turkic	15th century
10	Mamluk-Kipchak	16th century
11	Cuman	1770
12	Volga Türki	19th century
13	Fergana Kipchak	1920s
14	Chagatai	1921
15	Ottoman Turkish	1928
16	Fuyu Girgis	20th century
17	Soyot	20th century
18	Dukhan	21st century

== Well-known Turkic Dialects ==
Number	Dialect	Main Language
1	Rumelian dialect	Turkish language
2	Cypriot dialect	Turkish language
3	Afshar dialect	Azerbaijani language
4	Sonqori dialect	Azerbaijani language
5	Lop dialect	Uyghur language
6	Baraba dialect	Siberian Tatar language

== Ancestral ==
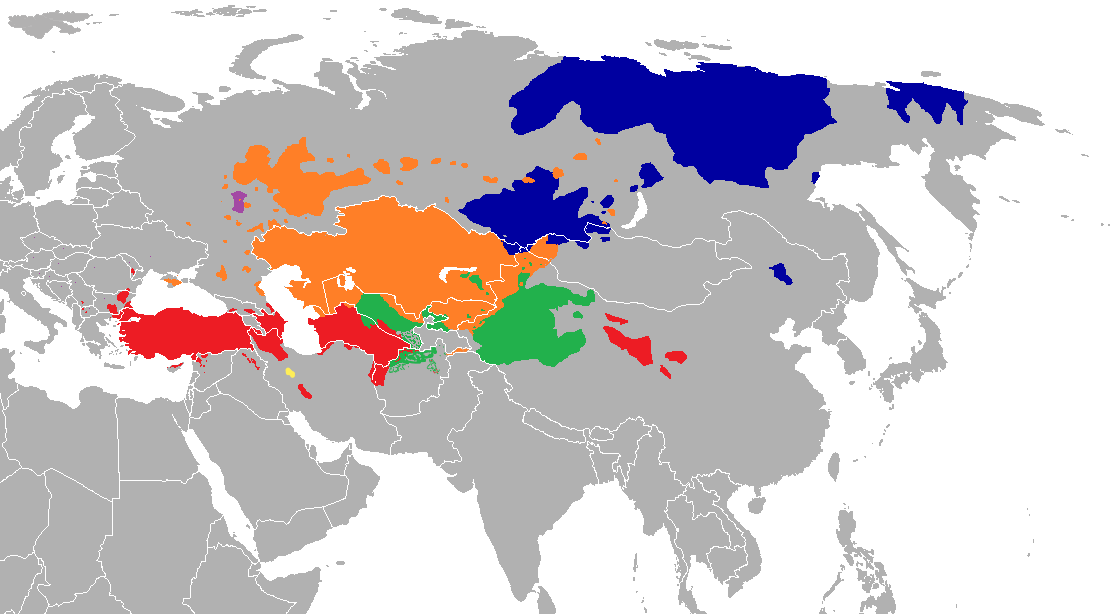
Geographical distribution of the Turkic languages. Dark Blue: Northeastern Common Turkic (Siberian Turkic languages); Green: Southeastern Common Turkic (Karluk languages); Orange: Northwestern Common Turkic (Kipchak languages); Red: Southwestern Common Turkic (Oghuz languages); Purple: Oghur languages

- Proto-Turkic

== Common Turkic (Shaz Turkic / Z Turkic) ==
=== Siberian Turkic ===
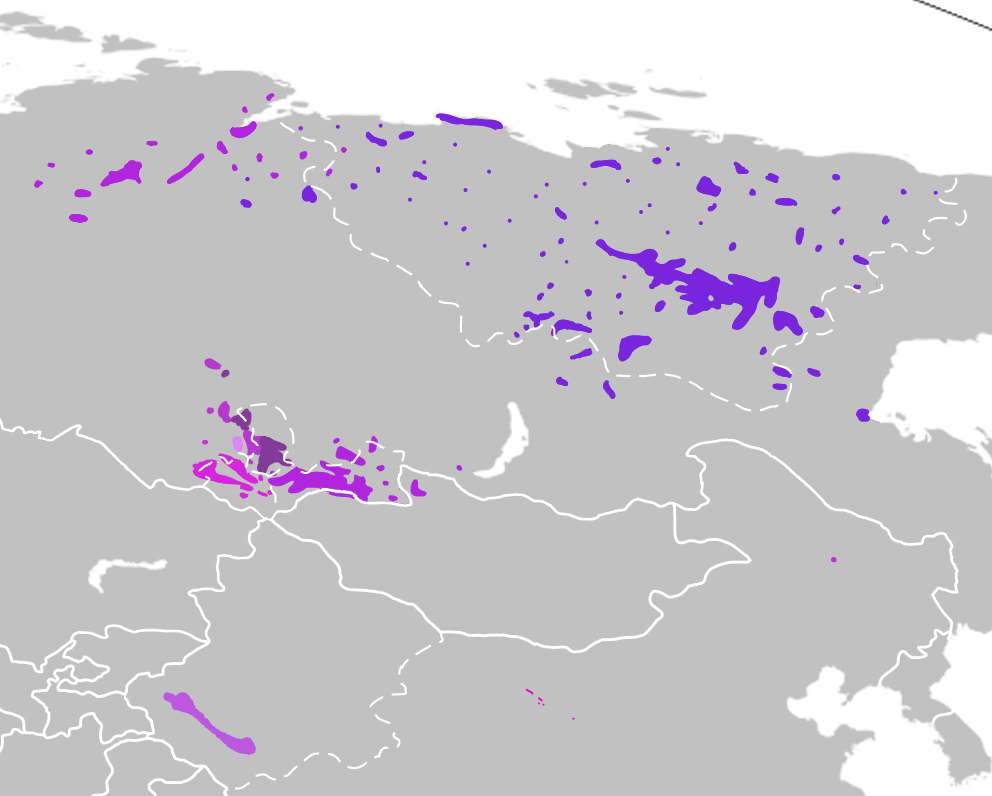
Siberian Turkic languages

    - South Siberian
      - Altai Turkic
        - Northern Altai
          - Tubalar
          - Kumandin/Qumanda
            - Turachak
            - Solton
            - Starobardinian
          - Chelkan (Kuu/Qu, Lebedin)
      - Chulym Turkic
        - Chulym
          - Lower Chulym (Küerik) (now believed extinct)
          - Middle Chulym
          - Upper Chulym
      - Sayan Turkic (dialect continuum)
        - Tofa
          - Tuha
          - Tsengel Tuvan
        - Tuvan
          - Western/Khemchik River (It is influenced by Altai)
          - Central (the geographical centrality of this dialect meant it was similar to the language spoken by most Tuvans, whether or not exactly the same). Forms the basis of the standard and literary language and includes:
            - Ovyur
            - Bii-Khem
          - Northeastern/Todzhi (it is spoken near the upper course of the Bii-Khem River by the Tozhu Tuvans. The speakers of this dialect utilize nasalization. It contains a large vocabulary related to hunting and reindeer breeding not found in the other dialects).
          - Southeastern (shows the most influence from the Mongolian language).
        - Taiga
          - Dukha or Tsaatan - spoken by the Dukha people of Tsagaan-Nuur county of Khövsgöl Province (nearly extinct)
          - Soyot-Tsaatan language spoken in the Okinsky District in Buryatia; now they speak the Buryat language) (Samoyedic Uralic substrate; people shifted first to a Turkic language and after to a Mongolian one - Buryat) (extinct)
      - Orkhon Turkic / Old Turkic / Old Uyghur (extinct) (not a direct ancestor of Uyghur, that descends from Karluk) (not synonymous with Proto-Turkic)
        - Yenisei Turkic
          - Khakas (Xakas tili)
            - Sagay/Saghay
            - Kacha/Qaça
            - Kamas Turk (Samoyedic Uralic substrate; people shifted to a Turkic language)
              - Koibal
              - Kamas (extinct)
            - Beltir
            - Kyzyl/Qizil
            - Fuyu Kyrgyz (could be a dialect of Khakas)
          - Shor
            - Mrassu (basis for literary and standard Shor)
              - Upper Mrassu
            - Kondoma
              - Upper-Kondoma
          - Western Yugur or "Yellow Uighur" (direct descendant of Old Uyghur)
    - North Siberian
      - Yakut
        - Central
          - Western Lena
          - Eastern Lena
          - Aldan
        - Peripheral
          - Northwestern
          - Northeastern
      - Dolgan (Dulğan) (Samoyed Uralic and Evenki Tungusic substrates)
        - Eastern – Khatanga
        - Central – Avam
        - Western – Yenisei, Norilsk

=== Karluk (Southeastern) ===
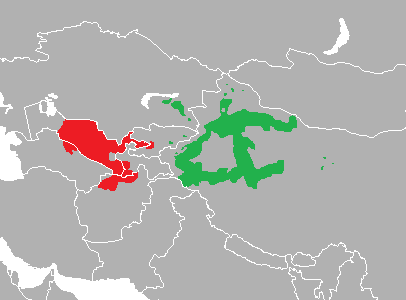
Karluk languages. Green: East Karluk; Red: West Karluk

Historically in Central Asia there was a distinction between sedentary, called Sart or Taranchi, and nomadic peoples (regardless of the ethnic group and language). Many times it was used confusingly because it was a generic word for several peoples and their languages (mainly Iranians or Turkics) and also because it had different meanings at different historical times (had shifting meanings over the centuries). Strictly it was not an ethnic or linguistic definition but one of a lifestyle. (strong Iranian substrate)

    - Chagatai or Turki (Jağatāy) (literary language of medieval Golden Horde in much of Central Asia) (extinct)
      - Pre-classical Chagatai (1400–1465)
        - Classical Chagatai (1465–1600)
          - Post-classical Chagatai (1600–1921)
        - Khorezmian Turkic (it was a literary language of the medieval Golden Horde of Central Asia and parts of Eastern Europe) (extinct)
      - East
        - Uyghur (not a direct descendant of the language called Old Uyghur, Old Turkic or Orkhon Turkic)
          - Eastern: Spoken in an area stretching from Qarkilik towards north to Qongköl
          - Central: Spoken in an area stretching from Kumul towards south to Yarkand
          - Southern: Spoken in an area stretching from Guma towards east to Qarkilik
          - Lop (Ľor télé) (could be a distinct language)
          - Khoton (extinct)
        - Ili Turki (Kipchak substrate)
      - West
        - Uzbek (Karluk Uzbek, Sart Uzbek – Sedentary and Urban Uzbek, “Modern Uzbek”) (strong Iranian substrate from Sogdian and Persian languages)
          - Northern Uzbek (Oʻzbekcha / Oʻzbek tili)
            - Ferghana Uzbek (not the same as Kipchak Uzbek)
            - Tashkent Uzbek
            - Chimkent/Shymkent-Turkestan Uzbek
            - Surkhandarya Uzbek
            - Khorezm Uzbek
          - Southern Uzbek / Afghan Uzbek (strong Iranian substrate from Bactrian language and heavily Persianized) (many are bilingual in Dari / Dari Persian / East Persian / Afghan Persian)

=== Kipchak (Northwestern) ===
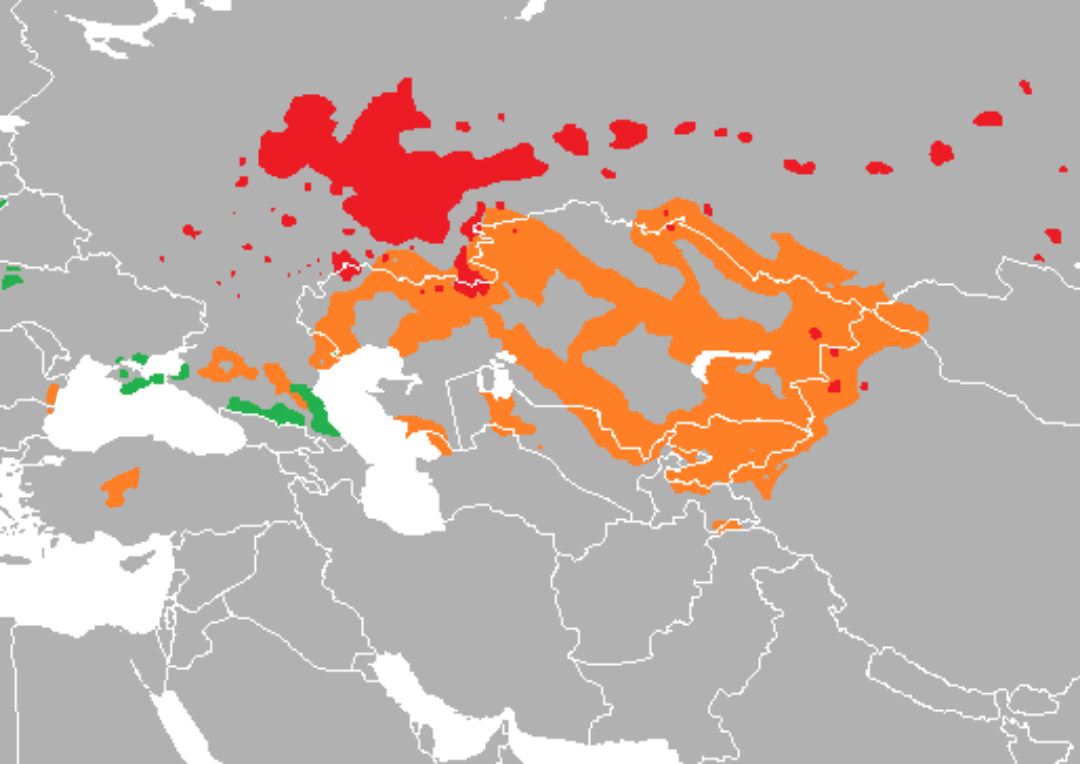
Orange: South Kipchak (Aralo-Caspian); Red: North Kipchak (Uralo-Caspian); Green: West Kipchak (Ponto-Caspian)

    - Kipchak (extinct)
      - South Kipchak (Aralo-Caspian Turkic)
        - Kipchak-Nogai
          - Steppe dialect of Crimean Tatar
            - Dobrujan Tatar (Tatarşa / Tatar tílí)
          - Fergana Kipchak (Kipchak Uzbek / ”Old Uzbek”) (nomadic and semi-nomadic Turkic of the regions of Fergana, Samarkand, Bukhara and Turkistan) (extinct)
          - Kazakh (Qazaqsha / Qazaq tili)
            - Eastern Kazakh
            - Southern Kazakh
            - Northern Kazakh
            - Western Kazakh
          - Karakalpak (Qaraqalpaq tili) (closer to Kazakh) (Iranian Kwarazmian and Turkic Kwarazmian substrates)
            - Northeastern Karakalpak
            - Southwestern Karakalpak
            - Fergana Valley Karakalpak?
          - Nogai
            - Karanogay-Nogai Proper
              - Karanogay or Qara-Nogai (literally "Black Nogai"; "Northern Nogai"), spoken in Dagestan
              - Central Nogai or Nogai Proper, in Stavropol
            - Aqnogai (White or Western Nogai), by the Kuban River, its tributaries in Karachay–Cherkessia, and in the Mineralnye Vody District. Qara-Nogai and Nogai Proper are very close linguistically, whereas Aqnogai is more different.
        - Kyrgyz-Kypchak
          - Kyrgyz (Kyrgyzcha / Kyrgyz tili)
            - Northern Kyrgyz (basis of standard Kyrgyz)
            - Southern Kyrgyz
              - Pamir Kyrgyz
          - Southern Altai
            - Altai proper
              - Mayma
            - Telengit
              - Tölös
              - Chuy
            - Teleut
          - Siberian Tatar
            - Eastern Siberian Tatar
              - Tom Tatar
              - Baraba Tatar
            - Western Siberian Tatar
              - Tobol-Irtysh Tatar
      - North Kipchak (Uralo-Caspian/Volga-Ural Turkic) (has some Uralic substrate)
        - Old Tatar / Old Bashkir (Volga Turki) (extinct)
          - Bashkir (Bashqortsa / Bashqort tele)
            - Southern
              - Dim
              - Egän (Zigan)
              - Eyek-Haqmar
              - Middle
              - Örşäk (Urshak)
            - Eastern
              - Arğayaş
              - Qyźyl
              - Meyäs
              - Halyot (Salyoğot)
            - Northwestern
              - Tanyp
              - Ğäynä (dialect of Perm Bashkirs)
              - Qariźel
              - Lower Ağiźel
              - Middle Ural
          - Tatar (Tatarça / Tatar Tele)
            - Central/Middle (Kazan) (basis of the standard literary Tatar)
            - Nagaibak
            - Western (Mişär or Mishar)
      - West Kipchak (Kipchak-Cuman/Ponto-Caspian Turkic)
        - Cuman (Polovtsian/Folban/Vallany/Kun) (extinct)
          - Armeno-Kipchak (extinct)
          - Mamluk-Kipchak (extinct)
          - Karachay-Balkar - Kumyk
            - Karachay-Balkar (Qaraçay-Malqar til / Tawlu til)
              - Karachay-Baksan-Chegem (basis of the standard language)
              - Balkar (Malqar)
            - Kumyk (“Caucasian Tatar”) (Qumuq til) (Oghur Turkic substrate – Khazar and Bulgar)
              - Terek
              - Khasavyurt
              - Buynaksk
              - Khaitag
              - Podgorniy
          - Mountain dialect of Crimean Tatar
          - Krymchak (Judeo-Crimean Tatar) (Qrımçah tılyı) (a different language from Karaim, not confuse with Karaim)
          - Urum (closely related to Crimean Tatar and spoken by Turkish-speaking Greeks of Southeastern Ukraine and Georgia, etymological related to the Turkish name for Rome - Rûm / Urum, associated with the name of the East Roman Empire, mainly Greek in language) (Greek substrate)
              - North Azovian (in Ukraine)
              - Tsalka (in Georgia)
          - Karaim (Judeo-Crimean) (Qaray tili / Karaj tili) (a different language from Krymchak, not confuse with Krymchak)
            - Crimean (in Crimea)
            - Trakai-Vilnius (in Lithuania)
            - Lutsk-Halych (in Ukraine)

=== Oghuz (Southwestern Turkic) ===
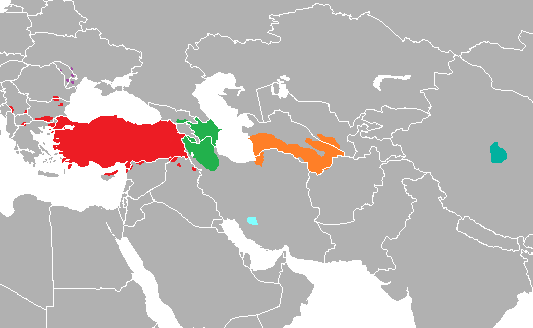
Orange: East Oghuz; Green; Azerbaijani; Red: Turkish; Purple: Gagauz; Light Blue: Qashqai; Greenish Blue: Salar

    - East Oghuz (Eastern)
      - Salar, an Oghuz language outlier strongly influenced by Karluk and Kipchak languages and also by non-Turkic languages like Tibetan and Chinese
        - Qinghai (Amdo) Salar
        - Ili Salar
      - Turkmen
        - Teke (Tekke) (basis of the standard Turkmen)
        - Nohurly
        - Ýomud
        - Änewli
        - Hasarly
        - Nerezim
        - Gökleň
        - Salyr
        - Saryk
        - Ärsary
        - Çowdur
        - Trukhmen
    - Transitional East-West Oghuz
      - Khorasani Turkic
        - North
        - South/Razavi
        - West
    - West Oghuz (Western)
        - Azerbaijani (Azeri Turkic, has an Iranian substrate from the Old Azeri language, an Indo-European language
          - South Azerbaijani
            - Ardabil
            - Qarapapaq
            - Shahsavani (Shahseven)
            - Muqaddam
            - Baharlu (Kamesh)
            - Nafar
            - Qaragözlü
            - Pishaqchi
            - Bayatlu
            - Qajar
            - Tabrizi (basis of Standard South Azerbaijani but not identical)
            - Iraqi Turkmen (South Turkmen)
          - North Azerbaijani
            - Salyan
            - Lenkaran
            - Qazakh
            - Airym
            - Borcala
            - Terekeme
            - Qyzylbash
            - Nukha
            - Zaqatala (Mugaly)
            - Qabala
            - Yerevan
            - Ordubad
            - Ganja
            - Shusha (Karabakh)
            - Karapapakh (extinct)
            - Shirvan dialect
              - Baku dialect (basis of Standard North Azerbaijani, but not identical)
            - Shamakhi
            - Quba
            - Derbend
            - Nakhchivan
        - Transitional Turkish Azerbaijani-Turkish
          - Eastern Anatolian Turkish
            - Meskhetian Turkish
            - Hemshen Turkish
            - Eastern Anatolian Turkish Proper (Kars, Erzurum, other regions)
            - Zaza Turkish (Turkish spoken by Zazas, not to be confused with Zaza, which is an Iranian language, Zaza substrate)
            - Kurdish Turkish (Turkish spoken by Kurds, not to be confused with Kurdish which is an Iranian language, Kurdish substrate)
          - Northeastern Anatolian Turkish (Kuzeydoğu Anadolu Ağızları)
            - Laz Turkish (Turkish spoken by Laz, do not confuse with Laz which is a Kartvelian language)
            - Trebizond (Trabzon) Turkish
      - Old Anatolian Turkish (extinct)
        - Turkish
          - Anatolian dialects (Anadolu Ağızları)
            - Western Anatolian (Batı Anadolu Ağızları)
              - Central (Orta Anadolu)
                - East central
                - West Central
              - Mediterranean (Akdeniz)/South (Güney)
                - Southwest (Güneybatı)
                - Southeast (Güneydoğu)
              - Black Sea (Karadeniz)/North (Kuzey)
                - Çorum, Çankırı
                - East Black Sea Coast
                - West Black Sea Coast
                - Sakarya-Izmit
              - Aegean (Ege)/West (Batı)
              - Yörük (Nomadic Anatolian Turkish)
          - Istanbul dialect (İstanbul Türkçesi) (basis of Modern Standard Turkish but not identical)
          - Syrian Turkmen (Syrian Turkish)
          - Cypriot Turkish
          - Balkanic/Rumelian/Danubian
            - East Balkanic/East Rumelian/East Danubian
              - Edirne
            - West Balkanic/West Rumelian/West Danubian
          - Karamanli Turkish (Turkish of the Karamanlides, Turkish-speaking Greeks, Greek language substrate, not confuse with Cappadocian Greek, a mixed language, or the Cappadocian Greeks, although they are related) (almost extinct)
        - Balkan Gagauz Turkish (Balkan Turkic) (Rumeli Türkçesi)
          - Gajal
          - Gerlovo Turk
          - Karamanli
          - Kyzylbash
          - Surguch
          - Tozluk Turk
          - Yuruk
          - Macedonian Gagauz
          - Gagauz
            - Bulgar Gagauzi
            - Maritime Gagauzi
        - Ottoman Turkish(extinct) (not a direct ancestor of Anatolian Turkish but a heavily Persianized and Arabized Turkic language)
          - Fasih Türkçe (Eloquent Turkish): the language of poetry and administration, Ottoman Turkish in its strict sense
          - Orta Türkçe (Middle Turkish): the language of higher classes and trade
          - Kaba Türkçe (Rough Turkish): the language of lower classes.
    - South Oghuz
      - Afshar (could be a dialect of South Azerbaijani language)
      - Aynallu (could be a dialect of South Azerbaijani language)
      - Qashqai (closely related to Azerbaijani)
      - Sonqori (could be a dialect of South Azerbaijani)
  - Pecheneg
    - Pecheneg (Peçenek) (extinct)

=== Arghu ===
    - Khalaj (a divergent member of the Common Turkic languages, not an Oghuz language) (heavily Persianized) (many are bilingual in Persian / Iranian Persian / Western Persian)
      - Northern
      - Southern

== Oghur (Lir Turkic / R Turkic) ==
- Proto-Oghur
  - Bulgar/Bolgar (extinct) (had a Uralic substrate)
    - Volga Bulgar (extinct)
      - Chuvash (Căvašla / Çovaşla)
        - Anatri, or Lower
        - Viryal, or Upper
    - Danube Bulgar (extinct in the 10th c. AD assimilated by the Slavic language of the Seven Slavic Tribes, that was close to Old Church Slavonic, but they chose the name Bulgarian as an ethnonym and also for their language because of the origins of much of their ruling class or political elite that was Turkic)
  - Khazar (extinct) (the language of the Khazars)

== Possible Turkic languages (all extinct) ==
Unclassified languages that may have been Turkic or members of other language families

- Hunnic / Xiongnu (?)
  - Hunnic / Hunnish - the language or languages of the Huns (there are several hypotheses about their language)
  - Xiongnu - the language or languages of the Xiongnu (may be the same as the Hunnic language, a closely related one, or not related at all) (there are several hypotheses about their language)
- Jie - the language of the Jie (in today's Northern China), might be a dialect of the Xiongnu language. (possibly the earliest attested Turkic language, or a Yeniseian language)
- Keraite - the language or languages of the Keraites (in today's Central Mongolia) (Mongolized after Temüjin, called Chinggis Khan, conquest in the 13th century) (Qarai Turks, the Kerey Kazakh group of the middle zhuz Argyns, the Kireis, a group of the Kyrgyz and many Torghut may descend from them) (there are several hypotheses about their language)
- Old Naiman - the language or languages of the old Naimans (in today's Western and Southwestern Mongolia) (Mongolized after Temüjin, called Chinggis Khan, conquest in the 13th century) (Naiman, however, is the Mongol name for the numeral eight) (there are several hypotheses about their language)
- Pannonian Avar - the language or languages of the Pannonian Avars (there are several hypotheses about their language)
- Tuoba - the language of Tuoba and possible related to Turkic languages.

== Possible Mixed languages ==
- Äynu / Aini (Äynú) (could be a mixed language) (Turkic cryptolect with a mainly Iranian vocabulary and Turkic grammar, spoken by the Äynu people, a different people from the Uyghur)
- Hezhou / Linxia (Uyghur-based creole, or Uyghur–Mandarin mixed language)

== Constructed languages ==
- Jalpi Türk language (crh) is a constructed language created by Ismail Gasprinsky in the 19th century.
- Ortatürk is a constructed language created by Baxtiyar Kärimov between 1993-2008.
- Öztürkçe is a semi-constructed, purified and controlled version of Turkish language.

== See also ==
- Turkic languages

By ISO 639-3 code
Enter an ISO code to find the corresponding language article.
