= The Children with the Golden Locks =

Folktale from the country of Georgia

The Children with the Golden Locks (German: Die Kinder mit dem Goldschopf; Russian: О златокудрых юноше и девушке, romanized: O zlatokudrykh yunoshe i devushke, lit. 'About the golden-haired boy and girl') is a Georgian folktale. It is classified in the international Aarne-Thompson-Uther Index as type ATU 707, "The Three Golden Children". These tales refer to stories where a girl promises a king she will bear a child or children with wonderful attributes, but her jealous relatives or the king's wives plot against the babies and their mother.

== Summary ==
A widowed man remarries. His new wife convinces him to abandon his three daughters. The father draws the three girls to the woods under the pretence of gathering apples. The man digs up a hole in the ground and covers it with a sheet. He climbs up the tree and beckons his daughters to come near the apple tree. The three sisters fall into the hole, and their father returns home.

Deep in the hole, they begin to feel hungry and the elder and middle sisters offer themselves to the others. The youngest, however, prays to God for an answer and her hands turn into a pickaxe and a spade. She excavates an exit out of the hole and reaches the king's stables. She steals the horses' fodder of almonds and raisins and takes them back to her sisters. One day, the horse groom notices that the horses are looking emaciated and investigates the matter. He discovers the girl stealing the horses' food and alerts the king.

The horse groom takes the three sisters to the king's court, who inquires them about their skills: the eldest claims she can weave a large carpet to accommodate the whole kingdom and then some; the middle one that she can cook a meal in an egg-shell for the whole kingdom, and the third sister promises to give birth to twin children, a boy and a girl with golden locks ("Goldschopf", in Dirr's text). The king marries the third sister and she gives birth to twins, but her jealous sisters replace the children for puppies and cast them in the sea in a box. The king then orders his wife to be bound in the castle gates, and for citizens to spit at and throw soot at her.

The box with the twins is found by a miller, who adopts and raises them as his own. Years later, when the boy and the girl are grown up, the king invites the mothers and matrons of his kingdom for a feast. The miller takes the children to the feast and pass by the woman at the gate. The boy and the girl give her roses, wipe the soot off her body and kiss her. They join the feast and tell the guests that the woman at the gate is their mother. The king refuses to believe the two, until the boy produces a branch of dried vine. The boy then proclaims that the dried vine will spring to life and yield grapes, and that a roasted pheasant will come to life, perch on the branch and spread its wings. It happens so, thus proving their parentage. The king embraces his children, reinstates his wife and punishes the sisters-in-law.

== Sources ==
Adolf Dirr stated that the source of this tale was the publication "Thedo Razikašvili, Xalxuri zγaprebi, Kaxet'sa da P'šavši šekrebuli", published in Tiflis in 1909.

== Analysis ==
=== Tale type ===
The tale is classified in the Georgian folktale index as tale type ATU 707, "Wonderful Children" (or "The Three Golden Children", in the international index). According to the Georgian folktale index, the children are born with golden hair and, years later, a "beautiful maiden" reveals the truth to the king.

Georgian scholarship also states that the "starting episode" of Georgian variants is another tale type, indexed as -480G*, "Stepmother and Stepdaughter": a man remarries and his new wife orders him to abandon his daughters in the woods; they fall into a hole, but dig a way out to the king's stables.

== Variants ==
=== Georgia ===
In The Three Sisters and their Stepmother, published by author Marjory Scott Wardrop, a widowed man with three daughters remarries. His new wife orders her husband to get rid of them. The man goes to the forest and digs a hole under an apple tree. He lures his daughters and they fall in the hole. Down in the hole, the youngest sister prays to God for a way out and her hands become a shovel and pickaxe. They dig an exit to the king's stables and eat almonds and raisins. The horse groom catches them one day and takes them to the king. The king inquires each of them about their skills: the youngest says she will bear two golden-haired boys. The truth is told by one of the brothers during a banquet with the king.

In a Georgian tale translated into Russian with the title "Три сестры" ("Three Sisters"), a widower has three daughters and remarries. His new wife hates her stepdaughters, and orders her husband to get rid of them. The man then goes to the woods, digs up a hole near an apple tree, and brings some apples with him back home. The man's daughters accompany him to the woods to pick up fruits and fall into the hole. Their father buries them and returns home. However, the girls pray to God for their hands to become shovels and pickaxes, and they excavate an exit to a king's stables. The girls steal the horses' fodder (almonds and raisins), which causes the horses to grow emaciated. The prince wonders about it and places a watchman: after three nights, the watchman discovers the three sisters. The prince then inquires the three sisters about their abilities: the elder boasts she can cook food for the whole army inside an eggshell, and there would be half left; the middle one that she can weave a carpet large enough for the people to sit on, and there would be space left; and the youngest promises to bear children with golden locks. The prince chooses the third sister as wife, and marries the other two to his personal servants. For the next three years, the prince's wife gives birth to three golden-haired children in three consecutive pregnancies, which the elder sisters replace for puppies (the two boys) and a stone (the girl) and throw each of them in the water in a box. The prince returns and, on finding no human children, orders his wife to be wrapped in animal's skin, tied to a door and spat on by the people. Back to the children, a miller finds the siblings and raises them by the mill. One day, the prince rides near the mill and spots the three children playing together, resigning himself to the animals born by his wife. The prince keeps visiting the miller's children (unaware they are his own sons), gifiting them gems and coins, and one day invites them to his palace. The prince's sisters-in-law, fearing their deception will be discovered, go to the miller's house and convince the girl to send her brothers on quests: first, for a golden shirt she can wear to be even more beautiful. The elder brother goes to fetch it, and an old woman says the shirt is nailed to a church door, guarded by lions and tigers. He brings back the shirt, and the prince's sisters-in-law talk about another quest: for a singing nightingale. The elder brother goes to fetch the bird, and becomes petrified. The middle brother goes next and also falls before the bird. Lastly, their young sister manages to find the bird, rescues her brothers, and they return home. The prince notices their absence, but the siblings explain their sister was sick, thus they could not fulfill his invitation. The nightingale, who can sing and speak, advise the children to bring bouquets to the woman nailed at the church door. It happens thus, and the elder sister try to poison their dish during the meal, but the bird warns them to throw the food to the dogs. The animals eat it and die. The next day, they invite the prince for another meal, where he learns the whole truth. The prince then orders his wife to be taken off the door, given a nice bath and clothes, and brought to him. The family is reunited at last.

=== Azerbaijan ===
Azerbaijani scholarship classifies tale type 707 in Azerbaijan as two Azeri types. In the first type, 707A, "Uşağın dəyişdirilməsi" ("Replacing Children"), the king overhears three sisters talking, the youngest of whom promising to bear children with hair of gold and hair of silver; the king marries the third sister and she gives birth to twins, a golden-haired daughter and a silver-haired son, who are replaced for puppies; the twins' mother is punished in a harsh way, while the children are rescued by a miller. The children reunite with their father years later. In the second type, indexed as 707B, the twins are sent on quests for extravagant objects by a witch; the male twin fulfills the quests with the help of a horse.

In an Azeri tale published by Azeri folklorist Hanafi Zeynalli with the title "Продавец шиповника" ("The Wild Rose Seller"), an old man sells wild roses for a living for him and his three daughters. He remarries. One day, his new wife tells him that his earnings are not enough for the whole family, and issues an ultimatum for him: either he stays with his three daughters and she leaves, or he stays with her and abandons his three daughters. He chooses the second option. The man goes to the market to buy some apples, while the stepmother covers up a well with grass. The man brings home the apples and the daughters ask where he got them. The stepmother tricks the girls to go outside. They fall into the well and the man leaves them there. Some time later, the girls begin to feel hungry and decide to eat the one who jumps the lowest. Every time, it is the youngest sister who does. However, they find some raisins on the ground to sate their hunger. After three days, they decide to excavate their way out of the well and discover where the raisins are coming from: the king's stables. They enter it to forage for more food from the horses. The king notices something wrong with the horses and investigates. He discovers the three girls and inquires about their skills: the eldest promises to weave a large carpet where the royal army would sit and there would still be space left; the middle sister that she can cook food for the while army in an egg shell; the youngest that she can bear twins, a boy and a girl with hair with a half of gold and a half of silver. The king marries all three sisters; the elder two fail in their boasts, while the youngest bears the twins, who are cast in the water and saved by a miller. Years later, the king meets his twins and takes them to dinner, where the whole truth is revealed.

In an Azeri Turkish tale collected from a source in Erdebil with the title Xoruz-u Neqel-xu, a padishah has forty wives, and still no child from any of them, thus he sends his vizier and his vekil to find a new bride for him. The duo find a shepherd's beautiful daughter and pay her brideprice to marry the padishah, and marries the monarch. Some months later, she is pregnant, and the sultan sends for a midwife. However, the mother of one of his co-wives offers to help in the delivery of the children. The padishah's new wife gives birth to twins, a boy and a girl with a mark on their cheeks, whom the woman replaces for two puppies and casts in the river in a basket. The padishah falls for the trick and banishes his wife to a deep well. Back to the children, a merchant finds the basket and rescues the twins, whom he raises with his wife and names Mehemmed (the boy) and Zerintac (the girl). The twins go to the madrassa to learn, but their colleagues mock them for being foundlings. The merchant and his wife confirm the story, and the twins decide to look for their birth parents. The merchant gives them a horse and a rifle, and advises them to establish themselves where the horse stops. Thus they leave home and establish themselves near a hill, Mehemmed hunting and Zerintac taking care of the house. Some time later, farmers pass by their house and marvel at Zerintac's beauty. The padishah learns of this and goes to investigate, falling in love with the strange girl. The padishah wishes to marry the girl and sends a person to inform the twins of his decision. Mehemmed, her brother, says he will give an answer in a few days' time. The padishah's mother-in-law gets word of the event and goes to meet this girl at her house: she realizes by the birthmark on her cheek she is the monarch's daughter, and so is her twin, so she decides to get rid of them. The woman tells Zerintac her house could be even more beautiful if her brother finds her an apple that cries and an apple that laughs from the orchard of Ağlar-güler - a trap, since the place is home to giants and thieves. Mehemmed goes to fulfill his sister's request and meets a dervish on the road, who advises him to buy some wooden clothes before he enters the orchard. He steals the apples from under the thieves' noses and returns home. Next, the padishah's mother-in-law convices the girl to search for an "el-dașı" or "eltaș" (a type of stone) that produces gold from one side and silver on the other when it rolls around. Mehemmed also fetches it. Lastly, the woman sends the twins for a talking rooster that lives in the orchard and tells of the past and the future. The man on the road warns Mehemmed about the petrifying powers of the rooster, and advises him to shoot at the bird. Mehemmed captures the bird and brings it home with him, since it can reveal the truth about their parents. The twins listen to the rooster's tale as it recalls their story up to a certain point, then everyone leaves to the padishah's court for his upcoming marriage. Mehemmed talks to the rooster and it continues the tale, revealing the twins are the padishah's children. The padishah is aghast at the idea of almost marrying his own daughter, and asks the bird where is his wife, to which the rooster answers she is still alive in the well and more beautiful than ever. The monarch rescues his wife from the well, beheads his mother-in-law and her daughter, and marries Mehemmed to the vekil's daughter and Zerintac to his vizier's son.

=== Dagestan ===
In a variant from Dagestan, "Три сестры" ("Three Sisters"), a man loses his wife. His three daughters convince their father to marry their neighbour. The woman becomes their step-mother, but, after some time, she convinces her husband to abandon the girls in the woods. The man goes to the market, buys some amber beads and goes to the woods to dig an up hole. He throws the beads into the hole and draws his daughters to the hole. They fall into the hole and the father covers the hole with a large rock. The sisters wish for their hands to become a shovel, a pickaxe and a spade, and begin excavating an exit. They reach the king's stable and hide under its roof, while one of them descends to get dates for the others. Time passes, and the king notices that his horses haven't been eating properly and sends his three sons to investigate. The two elders sleep on the job, but the youngest prince discovers the third girl, the prettiest of the sisters, who has been stealing the food. The king marries his three sons to the three women. The youngest gives birth to twins, a boy and a girl, with golden hair, but her sisters cast them in a box in the water. The twins are saved by an old woman. Years later, she takes them to a king's celebration. He notices the children and asks the old woman about them, then discovers they are his son and daughter.

=== Ossetia ===
In an Ossetian variant published by Ossetian-Russian folklorist Grigory A. Dzagurov with the title "Своевольная кривобокая девица Каскатина" (German: Das eigensinnige krumme Mädchen Kaskatina; English: "Maiden Kaskatina"), on her deathbed, a wife warns her husband not to marry a woman of certain aspect. He becomes a widower and his three daughters insist he remarries. He finds a woman just like his late wife warned him about and declines her proposal. The woman dyes her hair and tricks the man into marrying her. After the wedding, she begins to poison the father against the daughters. One day, he comes home with fine looking apples and their daughters ask where he found them. The man takes the three girls to the woods and draws them to a hole with a pile of apples. The girls fall into the hole and their father goes home. The three sisters pray to their deities for their fingers to become shovels and spades, so that they can excavate an exit out of the hole. They dig a way to the khan's mill, where they begin to live, sing and dance. Their activities draw the court and the khan's attention, who finds the trio. He inquires about their skills: the eldest claims to be able to weave a hundred felts from one bundle of wool, the middle that she can cook a meal for a hundred people with a single egg, and the youngest says she will bear him golden-haired twins, a boy and a girl. The khan marries the youngest and she gives birth to the golden-haired twin, but her sisters place them in a box and cast them in the river. The box washes ashore and the children live by themselves by the river bank. When they are older, their aunts convince the female twin to ask her brother to build an iron tower deep within the dark forest. After the tower is built, the midwife visits them and tells the girl to get a music-producing fur coat, a magical mirror (looking glass) and a girl named Kaskatina, who possesses magical petrifying powers. The brother fails to get Kaskatina; the sister saves him and brings Kaskatina with them. Kaskatina marries the male twin.

In another Ossetian tale, "Ӕрхуы мӕсыджы бадӕг бурчызг" or "Бронзовая девушка Медной башни" (French: "La fille blonde qui se tient dans la tour de cuivre", English: "The blond girl at the tower of copper"), a widowed man marries a woman that wants his three daughters to be abandoned in the woods. He leads them to a tree with bright red fruits and throws them in a pit. The three girls pray for salvation, and three shovels and pickaxes appear. They use the tools to excavate an exit to the prince's mill, where they rest and eat food. One day, the prince finds the three sisters and inquires about their abilities: the elder says she can stitch many types of footwear with only a quarter of leather; the second that she can prepare a great meal with a handful of flour, and the last that she can bear twins, a boy with golden hair and a girl with silver tresses. The king chooses the third girl as his wife, and takes the other two to live at the castle with them. Jealousy burning at their hearts, the two elder sisters take the children as soon as they are born and abandon them in the woods, to be suckled by a she-dog. As they grow up, they build a makeshift hut to house themselves and the she-dog; the sister stays at home and the brother hunts. One day, the two aunts visit them and convince the pair to seek a woman with blond hair that lives in a tower of copper. The boy takes his talking horse and gets the girl. The next day, their hut becomes a mansion of copper, with a tower of copper. Next, the two aunts convince them to look for a fur coat ("pelisse") stamped with a sun on the plastron and a moon on the back, and that produces music and sings.

In another Ossetian tale collected by philologist Bernhard Munkácsi, Ärtʼä čəˈzʒə āˈrɤau, and translated as Märchen von den drei Töchter (Russian: "Сказка о трёх сёстрах"; "The Tale of Three Daughters"), an old man loses his wife and remarries. His new spouse forces him to abandon his three daughters in the woods. He does just that; the girls fall into a hole. The youngest prays to God to give them shovels and pickaxes to excavate an exit. They dig a way out of the hole and into the king's stables, where they find food. The king's horses are getting thinner and he orders a night watch. His servants find the three maidens, and the king ('aldar') inquires them about their skills: the elder sister boasts she can sew shirts for then men; the middle one that, with a single cup of araki, she can make ten man drink from it; and the youngest promises golden-haired twins, a boy and a girl. Some time later, she bears the children, which are abandoned with a she-dog and replaced for puppies to disgrace her. The twins survive and are nursed by the she-dog, who hunts hares to feed them with. Years later, the aunts learn the twins are alive and send them for the jowl of a swine in the "Milchsees" ('sea lake') and for a wife for the Brother, a "golden maiden" that lives in a mountain beyond seven mountains. In the second quest, the male twin arrives at the golden maiden's place and is petrified by the maiden's powers. The female twin goes after him and forces the maiden to restore her brother, then the three of them return home. At the end of the tale, the golden maiden directs the twins to their father's house, where she reveals the twins are his children, showing him their golden curls.

=== Adyghe people ===
Tale type ATU 707 is also attested among the Adyghe people. In tale type 707, "Чудесные дети" ("Wonderful Children"), of the Adyghe Folktale Corpus, an old man abandons his three daughters in a hole in the forest, but the sisters are rescued by a khan and his retinue. The khan inquires them about their abilities: the elder two describe domestic skills, like sewing and cooking, and the third sister promises to bear wonderful children. The khan marries the youngest, to the elder sisters' envy, who take the children as soon as they are born and cast them in the water. Fortunately, a female water spirit named Псыхо - Гуаша ("Psykho-Guasha") rescues the children and raises them. Years later, the jealous aunts learn of their survival and send the twins on a quest for miraculous objects: for a golden bird, a magic mirror and for their owner, beautiful maiden Суисурет ("Suisuret"). At the end of the tale, the whole truth is revealed and the aunts are punished.

In a variant from the Adyghe people with the title "Три дочери старика" ("The old man's three daughters"), first collected in the mid-19th century and published in 1872, an old man brings some apples home and his daughters want to go with him the next time he picks up fruits. The man goes to the woods, digs up a hole near an apple tree and covers it with a carpet. He lures his daughters to the hole, they fall into it and he abandons them there. The three girls pray to God to save them and to provide them with food. With God's help, they climb out the hole and take shelter atop a tree. The khan passes by the forest and finds the three girls on the tree. He then inquires about their skills: the eldest says she can sew clothes for his army in one day; the middle one that she can sew clothes for 50 horsemen, and the youngest saying she will bear twins (a boy and a girl), both with a half of white gold and a half of yellow gold. The khan chooses the youngest as his wife. She gives birth to her twins, who are taken by her jealous sisters and cast in a box. The box with the children wash ashore and is found by a lady of the river, (Note: The compiler suggested that this character was related to a figure of Circassian mythology.) who raises the twins by the river bank, while their biological mother, as punishment, is tied to the khan's palace's gates. An old woman passes by the disgraced queen and asks for some flour, and bakes two cakes with her breastmilk. The old woman goes to the river bank and gives the children the cakes. They taste it; the boy recognizes their mother's milk, while the girl complains that hers was baked with water. They tell their adoptive mother the event and she says she has to let them go into the world. The boy then builds a house for him and his sister. A passing old man convinces the female twin to find them a dove and a maiden named Ayrish-Ayrishakan. The Brother gets the bird, but becomes stone due to the maiden's powers, and is rescued by his Sister.

=== Ingush people ===
In a tale from the Ingush people, collected in 1963 with the title "Мальчик с солнцем во лбу и месяцем между лопаток" ("The Boy with the Sun in his Mouth and the Moon between his shoulders"), a man remarries. His new wife wants him to get rid of his three daughters, so he abandons them in the woods under the pretence of picking up apples. The girls climb a tree to shelter themselves. A prince passes by with his retinue and finds them. He then inquires them about their skills: the oldest says she can weave clothes for 60 men in one night; the middle sister says she can cook a meal for 60 men with the quantity of wheat in a copper thimble, and the youngest that she can bear a son with a shining sun on the front and a moon between the shoulders. The prince marries the youngest sister and she gives birth to a boy just as she described. The boy is cast in the water by his aunts, but is saved and grows up. He is then sent to tame a red stallion, [wild] like a tiger, and to bring back a girl who can petrify people.

=== Abaza people ===
In a tale from the Abaza people, collected from a 48-year-old teller with the title "Златоволосая и Среброволосый" ("Goldenhair and Silverhair"), an old man has three daughters. He remarries, and his new wife orders him to get rid of the girls, else she will leave him. He leads the girls to the forest under the pretense of picking pears, and abandons them in a hole. The girls manage to excavate an exit through the walls of the hole and find a cellar that belongs to the khan. The king notices some food missing and discovers the girls. The khan inquires them about their skills: the eldest boasts that she can sew clothes for a hundred people in a day; the middle one that she can feed a hundred people in a day, the youngest promises to bear him twins, a girl with golden hair and a boy with silver hair. The khan marries the youngest sister and she gives birth to her children. The jealous elder sisters replace the twins with puppies and throws them into the sea in a barrel, while the khan orders his wife to be sewn in a bull's hide and banished to the crossroads with her puppies. The children break free of the barrel and build a house by the shore. One day, the khan meets the silver-haired twin when going to the mosque. The jealous aunts, knowing that their deceit may be discovered, send a messenger to the twins' house. While the silver-haired brother goes hunting, the golden-haired sister stays at home. The messenger tell her about the shining golden comb of the maiden Dshakhyaki, her mirror that can see everything its owner wishes to see in it, and her golden apple. The brother obtains the items, then goes for Dshakhyaki herself. With the mirror, the golden-haired girl sees her mother abandoned in a road with the two puppies, and feels sorry for them; their golden apple fructifies into a garden of golden apple trees. The Brother turns to stone when facing Dshakhyaki, and his sister rescues him. The maiden marries the Brother and reveals the truth to the king and the entire court at her wedding.

=== Balkar people ===
In a tale from the Balkars with the Balkar title "Бир кишини юц къызы" (Bir kiṡini üc qızı; Russian: "Три дочери одного человека"; German: Die drei Töchter eines Mannes, English: "Three Daughters of One Man"), a father loses his wife, but remarries a woman that mistreats his three daughters. One day, he comes back from the woods with some pears and apples to feed them, and they tell him they wish to join him next time. The next day, he prepares a trap for his daughters: he digs up a hole near an apple tree and covers it with some branches; he draws the girls to the hole and they fall inside. The man abandons the girls in the hole and returns home. The three girls escape from the hole by using a pickaxe their father forgot there. They climb out of the hole and live in woods, gathering fruits form themselves and climbing up trees to rest. The khan's retinue passes by the same tree one night and the youngest girl climbs down the tree and mends the torn garments from the khan's retinue. The next day, the retinue notice their mended clothes and think that the tree brought luck for them. After two nights of this, a night guard discovers the girls and reports the finding to the khan. The khan asks them about their skills: the eldest promises that she can make garments for her husband and his friends on the same night they return form a hunt; the middle one that she can prepare food in a single night that will feed them during a whole hunt; and the youngest promises to bear twins like the world has never seen. The khan marries all three women, and before he goes on a hunt, orders his wives to fulfill their boasts. The youngest wife gives birth to a boy and a girl, who are replaced for puppies and thrown in the sea by the jealous sisters. Learning of this, the khan orders his third wife to be banished with the puppies to the deepest part of the woods. The twins survive and are adopted by an old couple. The boy becomes a fine hunter. However, their adoptive parents suggest they move out to a nearby house, but to keep visiting them. So, the twins build a hut for themselves with animal hides and live in the forest. One night, the fire is put out, and the female twin goes to a neighbour's house to borrow some coals for her fire, and meets two women - her aunts. The aunts notice that the girl is their niece. The next day, while the male twin is on a hunt, they visit the twins' house and tells about a lake whose water, if sprinkled on four trees, will create a house of gold and precious gems. The brother gets the water and sprinkles on their humble hut and a palace appears overnight. The next time, the aunts visit her to tell the girl about a magical fur coat: its lapels play the fiddle; its sleeves applaud to a rhythm, and its coattails dance. The third object is a magic mirror from somewhere that shows the world. Lastly, the aunts send the twins for a maiden with golden hair and silver teeth as a wife for the male twin. The brother rides his horse to the maiden's tower and is petrified. The sister sees her brother in the mirror, dresses in man's clothes and rides a horse to the maiden's tower to rescue her brother and bring the maiden back with them. Some time later, the brother goes on a hunt and ventures deep in the woods. He sees two dogs run behind a tree. He follows the animals and finds its master: a person that looked like an animal. He brings the person with him and feeds them with bone marrow; after some time, the person regains some semblance of humanity: it is their mother. One day, the twins' father, the khan, announces he will make a parade, and orders his two elder wives to prepare food and garments. A woman in the crowd tells him about a beautiful maiden that lives with a pair of twins that live nearby, and he agrees to invite her. The maiden goes to the khan's palace and joins the other women in telling stories. She begins her tale from the beginning: the father who remarried; the abandonment of his daughters; the khan in the forest; the promises of the three sisters; the birth of the twins. The khan notices it is the story of his wife's family. The maiden takes the khan to the twins' palace and meets his children and wife.

=== Karachay-Balkar people ===
In a tale from the Karachay-Balkar language, translated into Russian with the title "Женщина с серыми глазами" ("Wife with Gray Eyes"), a man loses his wife, and does not wish to leave his three daughters motherless. His elder daughter suggests he marries a woman with red hair and gray eyes. One day, he goes looking for a woman that matched the description, when he meets a witch ('obur') that suggests he takes her as his wife. The man declines, saying he is looking for the red-haired woman with gray eyes. The witch then goes back home, dyes her hair and eyes with potions, and goes to meet the man again, this time in her disguise. The man takes the witch as his wife, who begins to mistreat the three girls with hard work, and even beats them. She also poisons her husband against the girls, and convinces him to get rid of them. The man agrees, and the witch tells him their plan: he is to draw them to the forest with an excuse to pick apples, and let them fall into a hole, so they will never come out. The next day, the man hides some apples in his clothes, and the girls become interested in going with their father to gather some. The man takes them to the woods and shakes an apple tree so the fruits fall to the ground; the girls go to gather them and fall into the hole. Their father covers the hole with earth and returns home. Meanwhile, the khan and a retinue are hunting in the area, and his dogs begin to dig out the hole. The khan orders his soldiers to keep digging and they find the girls, barely alive. The khan brings them all home with him and marries the oldest sister. After a while, he inquires them about their abilities: the elder sister promises to bear him twins with golden teeth and golden hair; the middle one that she can sew clothes for his servants in a night; and the youngest that she can weave him a golden saddle. Some time later, the khan has to depart and leaves his wife in his sisters-in-law's care, and gives her a silver rein with bells on so she can warn him after the children are born. The witch, her stepmother, takes notice of this, goes to the castle to muffle the bells and, when the twins are born, she replaces them for puppies and casts them in the river. When the khan returns, he sees the puppies and orders his wife to be sewn in an ox hide and places in a crossroads for the people to spit and trample her. Back to the children, they are rescued from death by a creature named су-анасы ('Su-Anasy', 'water mother'), and raised by the river: sometimes they come out of the water and play by a rock in the middle of the river. One day, their mother sees the children and asks a passing woman to squeeze her breasts for some milk to gush forth; the woman bakes two cakes with her breastmilk, then gives them to the children. The twins eat the cakes with relish, and Su-anasy explains they were baked with their real mother's milk, telling them the whole truth. The twins leave the river and go to their father's city, but their step-grandmother scares them away. Later, the male twin kills some deer in the woods and fashions a tent for themselves. The khan, their father, learns of the beautiful twins living in the woods and invites them for a feast. During the meal, the male twin tries to give some boza for a ram, and the khan asks if an animal can drink such a beverage, to which the male twin replies if a human woman can bear animals. The witch, their step-grandmother, tries to dismiss his words, but the twins reveal their golden hair and teeth, proving their claims. The khan restores his wife and kills the witch.

=== Tatar people ===
Author James Riordan translated a tale from the Tatar people with the title Altynchech and the Padishah's Wife. In this tale, a man has a wife and three daughters. The man's wife dies and he remarries. His second wife orders him to get rid of his daughters. The man digs out a hole in the forest, covers it and draws his daughters to the trap by telling them they will gather berries. He guides them to an apple tree and the girls walk over the hole and fall into it. The man abandons the trio there and goes back home. The girls stay in the hole for days, and survive by eating apples, until the tree has no more fruits. After a while, the youngest orders her sisters to climb on top of each other, so she can leave the hole and look for help. The youngest daughter climbs out of the hole and happens to find a padishah's hunting party. The padishah orders the other girls to be rescued from the hole and inquires each one about their skills: the eldest promises to sew clothes for the entire army with a single thread of linen; the middle one promises to feed the entire army with a single loaf of bread, and the youngest promises she will give birth to a boy and a girl "fairer than the sky at dawn". The elder sisters fulfill their boasts, but the padishah chooses the youngest sister as his wife. Spurred by envy of their cadette's good fortune, they conspire to replace her: while the padishah is away at war, she gives birth to her promised twins, which the sisters replace for two black skunks and take to the forest to a hermit woman's hut. The padishah returns from war and, finding out about his "children", orders his wife to be banished to a hut and to be spat on by the people. Meanwhile, the twins are raised by the hermit woman in her hut, the boy becoming a skilled hunter that brings home animal furs for his sister. The twins' jealous aunts go to the hermit woman's hut and forces her to cast a spell on the female twin, so she may desire impossible things: first, the wild black stallion; second, the milky lake where the golden duck swims with her ducklings; lastly, for a golden-haired maiden named Altynchech, who lives beyond the Mountains of Heaven. The male twin rides the stallion he tamed to Altynchech's palace and shouts for her to come out, warned by the horse of her petrifying powers. After three shouts, the palace crumbles and the maiden comes with him to his house. During a hunt, the padishah sees the boy showing his great hunting prowess and comments with his sisters-in-law, who fear they will be discovered. The male twin falls in love with Altynchech, who agrees to marry him after he avenges his mother's shame. The boy asks the maiden about their mother, and she reveals the whole truth to the twins.

=== Kumyk people ===
In a variant from the Kumyks, collected in Dagestan with the Kumyk title "Къарачач" (Russian: Карачач, romanized: Karachach), a widowed old man sets a test before he remarries: he will only marry if a pair of leather boots rot under the roof. A neighbour woman finds the boots and accelerates their decay, to allow her to marry him. Time passes; she begins to despise her three step-daughters, and orders her husband to get rid of them in the woods. The man digs up a hole next to a tree and draws his daughters there; they fall in the hole, and their father abandons them. The girls manage to excavate an exit to the king's stables, where they live on the horses' ration. The king discovers them and inquires about their abilities: the elder girl claims she can sew garments for 40 men, the middle one that she can cook a large meal only with a handful of rice in an eggshell, and the youngest that she will bear him twins, a boy with golden curls and a girl with the moon on the forehead. The elder two fail to deliver, but their sister is pregnant with the twins. Spurred by envy, they take the twins, cast them in the water in a box and replace them for puppies. The twins are saved by a fisherman named Dazhanhuvat, and are given the names Suvsar ("Сувсар", the girl) and Tabuldu ("Табулду", the boy). Years later, the twins' aunts discover their nephews have survived and send the "enem" to their house. The enem convinces Suvsar to send her twin for the branch of a magical dancing tree and some water from a magical singing fountain. Tabuldu goes to a palace, breaks off a branch from the tree and fetches some water from the spring, and returns home to use them in their garden. He plants the branch and waters it with the magical water, and suddenly the same spring appears and the branch turns into a tree with clapping leaves and dancing branches. Knowing the twins succeeded in their first quest, the aunts and enem send them on another quest, for Karachach herself, a maiden with petrifying powers.
