= Mamluk-Kipchak language =

Medieval Turkic language of the Mamluk Sultanate

Mamluk-Kipchak
- Mameluk-Kipchak
- Native to: Mamluk Sultanate
- Region: Egypt and Syria
- Ethnicity: Mamluks
- Extinct: after 1516
- Language family: Turkic: Common Turkic; Kipchak; Kipchak-Cuman; Mamluk-Kipchak
- Writing system: Ottoman Turkish

Language codes
- ISO 639-3: None (mis)
- Glottolog: None

Mamluk-Kipchak was a Kipchak language that was spoken in Egypt and Syria during the Mamluk Sultanate period.

== Classification ==
The Mamluk-Kipchak language belongs to the Cuman-Kipchak group of Kipchak languages. Other Cuman-Kipchak languages include Kumyk, Karachai-Balkar, Crimean Tatar.

== History ==
Since most of the Mamluk rulers were monolingual Turkic speakers, several dictionaries were compiled to enable communication between the Arabic speaking population of the empire and its rulers. The language was also used as a literary language and several Arabic and Persian works have been translated to Kipchak by Mamluks. It was written in the Arabic script.

Mamluk-Kipchak lost its ground as the dominant Turkic language to Oghuz Turkic among the ruling Burji dynasty.

== Literature ==
- Kitab al-'idrak li-lisan al-'atrak (كتاب الإدراك للسان الأتراك) 'Aspects of the Turkic language' archive (in Arabic), Ibn Hayyan.
- «At-Tufhat-uz-zakiya fil-lugat-it-Turkiyya» «Valuable gift to Turkish language»
