= Khalaj language =

Turkic language spoken in western Iran

Khalaj
- خلج
- Khalaj in the Persian Nasta'liq form
- Native to: Iran
- Region: Distributed throughout a number of villages in the Markazi Province from Qom to Ashtian and Tafresh
- Ethnicity: Khalaj
- Native speakers: 19,000 (2018)
- Language family: Turkic: Common Turkic; Arghu; Khalaj
- Early form: Arghu
- Dialects: Talx-āb; Xarrāb; Dāγān

Language codes
- ISO 639-3: klj
- Glottolog: turk1303
- ELP: Khalaj
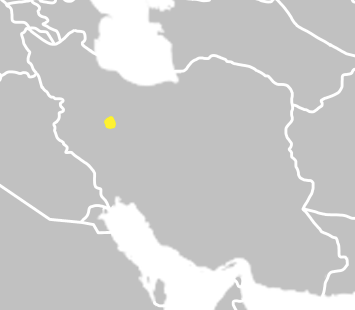
- Map of the location of the Khalaj Language.

Khalaj is a Turkic language spoken in Iran. Although it contains many old Turkic elements, it has become widely Persianized. Khalaj has about 150 words of uncertain origin.

Surveys have found that most young Khalaj parents do not pass the language on to their children; only 5% of families teach their children the language.

The Khalaj language is a descendant of an old Turkic language called Arghu. The 11th-century Turkic lexicographer Mahmud al-Kashgari was the first person to give written examples of the Khalaj language, which are mostly interchangeable with modern Khalaj.

Gerhard Doerfer, who first scientifically described Khalaj, demonstrated that it was an independent branch from Common Turkic.

== Classification ==
The Turkic languages are a language family of at least 35 documented languages spoken by the Turkic peoples.

While initially thought to be closely related to Azerbaijani, linguistic studies, particularly those done by Gerhard Doerfer, led to the reclassification of Khalaj as a distinct non-Oghuz branch of the Turkic language family. Evidence for the reassignment includes the preservation of the vowel length contrasts found in Proto-Turkic (PT), word-initial *h, and the lack of the sound change *d > y characteristic of Oghuz languages.

The conservative character of Khalaj can be seen by comparing the same words across different Turkic varieties. For example, in Khalaj, the word for 'foot' is hadaq, while the cognate word in nearby Oghuz languages is ayaq (compare Turkish ayak). Because of the preservation of these archaic features, some scholars have speculated that the Khalaj people are the descendants of the Arghu Turks.

Ethnologue and ISO formerly listed a Northwestern Iranian language named "Khalaj" with the same population figure as the Turkic language. The Khalaj speak their Turkic language and Persian, and the supposed Iranian language of the Khalaj is spurious.

== Geographical distribution ==
Khalaj is spoken mainly in Markazi Province in Iran distributed throughout a number of villages from Qom to Ashtian and Tafresh. Doerfer cites the number of speakers as approximately 17,000 in 1968, and 20,000 in 1978. Ethnologue reports that the population of speakers grew to 42,107 by 2000; however, in 2018 Khalaj poet and researcher Ali Asghar Jamrasi estimated the number of speakers to be 19,000.

=== Dialects ===
The main dialects of Khalaj are Northern and Southern. Within the dialect groupings, individual villages and groupings of speakers have distinct speech patterns.

The linguistic difference between the most distant dialects is not smaller (or even bigger) than Kazan Tatar and Bashkir or between Rumelian Turkish and Azerbaijani.

== Phonology ==
=== Consonants ===
Consonant phonemes
		Labial	Alveolar	Post- alveolar	Velar	Uvular	Glottal
Nasal		m	n		ŋ		
Stop/ Affricate	voiceless	p	t	ç [t͡ʃ]	k	q	
Stop/ Affricate	voiced	b	d	c [d͡ʒ]	ɡ	ɢ	
Fricative	voiceless	f	s	ş [ʃ]	x		h
Fricative	voiced	v	z	ʒ	ğ [ɣ]		
Approximant			l		j		
Rhotic			r				

=== Vowels ===
Vowel phonemes
	Front		Back	
	unrounded	rounded	unrounded	rounded
Close	i [i] í [iː]	ü [y] ű [yː]	ı [ɯ] ì [ɯː]	u [u] ú [uː]
Mid	e [e] é [eː]	ö [ø] ő [øː]		o [o] ó [oː]
Open	ə [æ] ə́ [æː]		a [a] á [aː]	

Doerfer claims that Khalaj retains three vowel lengths postulated for Proto-Turkic: long (e.g. qán [qaːn] 'blood'), half-long (e.g. bàş [baˑʃ] 'head') and short (e.g. hat [hat] 'horse'). However, Alexis Manaster Ramer challenges both the interpretation that Khalaj features three vowel lengths and that Proto-Turkic had the same three-way contrast. Some vowels of Proto-Turkic are realized as falling diphthongs, as in [quo̯l] 'arm'.

== Grammar ==
=== Morphology ===
==== Nouns ====
Nouns in Khalaj might receive a plural marker or possessive marker. Cases in Khalaj include genitive, accusative, dative, locative, ablative, instrumental, and equative.

Forms of case suffixes change based on vowel harmony and the consonants they follow. Case endings also interact with possessive suffixes. A table of basic case endings is provided below:

Case	Suffix
Nominative	∅ (unmarked)
Genitive	-Un, -u:y, -i:, -i:n
Dative	-A, -KA
Accusative	-I, -NI
Locative	-čA
Ablative	-dA
Instrumental	-lAn, -lA, -nA
Equative	-vāra

The equative can also be expressed by the words təkin, təki (compare to Uzbek -dek) and other forms.

==== Verbs ====
Verbs in Khalaj are inflected for voice, tense, aspect, and negation. Verbs consist of long strings of morphemes in the following array:

Stem + Voice + Negation + Tense/Aspect + Agreement

Due to Persian influence, Khalaj has, like Qashqai, lost converb constructions of the form -Ib/-Ip.

=== Syntax ===
Khalaj employs subject–object–verb word order. Adjectives precede nouns.

== Vocabulary ==
The core of Khalaj vocabulary is Turkic, but many words have been borrowed from Persian. Words from neighboring Turkic languages (namely Azerbaijani), have also made their way into Khalaj.

For example, Khalaj numbers are Turkic in form, but some speakers replace the forms for "80" and "90" with Persian terms.

== Examples ==
Excerpt from Doerfer & Tezcan 1994, transliterated by Doerfer:

Translation	IPA	In Latin alphabet	In Arabic script
Once, Mullah Nasreddin had a son.	biː ki.niː mol.laː nas.ɾæd.diː.niːn oɣ.lu vaːɾ-aɾ.ti	Bí kiní mollá nasrəddínín oğlu vár-arti.	بیٚ کوٚنیٚ موْللا نصرالدیٚنینْ اوْغلو وار اَرتی.
He said, "Oh Father, I want a wife."	hay.dɨ ki "æj baː.ba, mæŋ ki.ʃi ʃæj.jo.ɾum"	Haüdı ki "Əy bába, məñ kişi şəyyorum."	هاوْدیٛ کی «ای بابا، من کیشی شَی‌یوْروم.»
He said, "My dear, we have a cow; take this cow and sell it. Come with the proceeds, we shall buy you a wife!"	hay.dɨ ki "bɒː.ba bi.zym biː sɨ.ɣɨ.ɾɨ.myz vaːɾ, je.tip bo sɨ.ɣɨ.ɾɨ saː.tɨ, naɣd ʃæj.i puˑ.lĩn, jæk biz sæ̃ ki.ʃi al.duq"	Haüdı ki "Bába bizüm bí sığırımüz vár, yetip bo sığırı sátı. Nağd şəyi púlín, yək biz sə̃ kişi alduq!"	هاوْدیٛ کی «بابا بیزوٚم بیٚ سیٛغیری‌موٚز وار، یئتیپ بوْ سیٛغیری ساتی. نقد شی‌یی پوُلینْ، یک بیز سن کیشی آلدوُق.

A piece of folk poetry by Abdullah Vasheqani, transcribed in the Common Turkic alphabet and translated into English by Hasan Güzel:

Khalaj

Vaşqan baluqum xeleç teq var tilim
canumda yiter baluqum o tilim
til o baluqumu dunyalan teyişmem
Vaşqan turpaqum o xeleç teq tilim

English

Vasheqan my village, Khalaj my language
Better than my life, my language and village
I wouldn’t change my language and village for the world
Vasheqan is my land, and Khalaj is my language

== Sources ==
- Cheung, Johnny; Aydemir, Hakan (2015). "Turco-Afghanica: On East Iranian *amarnā and Turkic alma, alïmla, almïla 'apple'". In Pelevin, Mikhail (ed.). Turco-Afghanica "На Пастбище Мысли Благой". Сборник статей к юбилею И. М. Стеблин-Каменского ["On the Pasture of Good Thoughts": Collected Articles for the Anniversary of I. M. Steblin-Kamensky] (in Russian and English). Saint Petersburg: Kontrast. pp. 73–94. ISBN 9785438001256. OCLC 1038607183.
- Doerfer, Gerhard (1971). Khalaj Materials. Bloomington: Indiana University Publications. ISBN 9780877501503. OCLC 240052.
- Doerfer, Gerhard (1978). "Khalaj and its relation to the other Turkic languages". Yearbook of Turkic Studies – Belleten 1977. 25: 17–32. ISSN 0564-5050. Archived from the original on 2021-09-24.
- Doerfer, Gerhard; Tezcan, Semih (1980). Wörterbuch des Chaladsch (Dialekt von Charrab) [Khalaj Dictionary (Charrab Dialect)]. Bibliotheca Orientalis Hungarica (in German and Khalaj). Vol. 26. Budapest: Akadémiai Kiadó. ISBN 9789630518420. OCLC 8095415.
- Doerfer, Gerhard; Tezcan, Semih (1994). Folklore-Texte der Chaladsch [Folklore Texts of the Khalaj] (in German and Khalaj). Wiesbaden: Harrassowitz. ISBN 9783447034845. OCLC 32612731.
- Dybo, Anna (2006). Хронология тюркских языков и лингвистические контакты ранних тюрков [Chronology of Turkic languages and linguistic contacts of early Turks]. In Tenišev, E. R.; Dybo, A. V. (eds.). Пратюркский язык-основа. Картина мира пратюркского этноса по данным языка [Proto-Turkic Base Language: A Picture of the World of the Proto-Turks According to Their Language] (PDF). Сравнительно-историческая грамматика тюркских языков [Comparative-Historical Grammar of Turkic Languages] (in Russian). Vol. 6. Moscow: Nauka. pp. 766–817. ISBN 9785020327108. OCLC 13008487. Archived (PDF) from the original on 2018-12-17.
- Güzel, Hasan (Winter 2022). "Khalaj Literary Production in an Electronic Cultural Environment in the Context of Cultural Sustainability". Millî Folklor. 17 (136): 94–108. doi:10.58242/millifolklor.1038429. ISSN 2146-8087.
- Kıral, Filiz (2000). "Reflections on –miš in Khalaj". In Johanson, Lars; Utas, Bo (eds.). Evidentials: Turkic, Iranian and Neighbouring Languages. The Hague: Walter de Gruyter. pp. 89–102. ISBN 9783110805284. OCLC 868974004.
- Knüppel, Michael (2010). "ḴALAJ ii. Ḵalaji Language". In Yarshater, Ehsan (ed.). Encyclopædia Iranica (Online ed.). Encyclopædia Iranica Foundation. Archived from the original on 2019-12-11.
- Kuribayashi, Yuu (2021). "Turkish and Uyghur verb-verb complexes in contrast". In Kageyama, Taro; Hook, Peter E.; Pardeshi, Prashant (eds.). Verb-Verb Complexes in Asian Languages. Oxford Linguistics. Oxford: Oxford University Press. pp. 455–470. doi:10.1093/oso/9780198759508.003.0017. ISBN 9780191077432. OCLC 1245491300.
- Johanson, Lars; Csató, Éva Ágnes (1998). The Turkic Languages. London: Routledge. ISBN 9780415082006. OCLC 40980286.
- Manaster Ramer, Alexis (1995). "Khalaj (and Turkic) vowel lengths revisited". Wiener Zeitschrift für die Kunde des Morgenlandes. 85: 187–197. JSTOR 23866156.
- Ölmez, Mehmet (February 1995). "Halaçlar ve Halaçça" [Khalajis and Khalaj] (PDF). Çağdaş Türk Dili (in Turkish). 7 (84): 15–22. ISSN 1300-1345. OCLC 222016380. Archived (PDF) from the original on 2011-11-12.
- Ragagnin, E. (August 2020). "Major and Minor Turkic Language Islands in Iran with a Special Focus on Khalaj". Iranian Studies. 53 (3–4): 573–588. doi:10.1080/00210862.2020.1740881. S2CID 218924277.
- Robbeets, Martine (2015). Diachrony of Verb Morphology: Japanese and the Transeurasian Languages. Trends in Linguistics. Studies and Monographs. Berlin & Boston: De Gruyter Mouton. doi:10.1515/9783110399943. ISBN 9783110378238. ISSN 1861-4302. OCLC 945754396.
- Shcherbak, A. M. (1997). Xaлaджcкий язык [Khalaj language]. In Tenišev, E. R. (ed.). Тюркские языки [Turkic Languages]. Языки мира [Languages of the World] (in Russian). Vol. 2. Moscow: Indrik. pp. 470–476. ISBN 9785857590614. OCLC 68040217.
