= Fergana Kipchak language =

Extinct Kipchak Turkic language

Fergana Kipchak
- Färğona tili Фәрғона тили
- Native to: Uzbekistan
- Region: Fergana Valley
- Ethnicity: Fergana Kipchak
- Extinct: after 1920s
- Language family: Turkic: Common Turkic; Kipchak; Kipchak-Kyrgyz/Kipchak-Nogai; Fergana Kipchak

Language codes
- ISO 639-3: None (mis)
- Linguist List: qwm Kipchak Uzbek
- Glottolog: None

Fergana Kipchak, also Kipchak Uzbek, Qomanian, Fergana Valley Kirghiz is an extinct Kipchak Turkic language of the Kipchak-Nogai branch formerly spoken in the Fergana Valley of Central Asia. In some districts of the Fergana Region, linguistic features of Fergana Kipchak are seen, especially in phonetics. These districts are Bagʻdod, Buvayda, Uchkoʻprik and parts of neighboring districts. Many idioms spoken in Uzbekistan that are now considered part of the Kyrgyz language are actually Fergana Kipchak. According to E. D. Polivanov, the Fergana Kipchak language existed as a separate idiom as late as in the 1920s. According to Yevgeny Polivanov, it is close to Kyrgyz. According to A. N. Samoilovich, some descendants of Fergana Kipchak-speakers identify as a separate people from the Uzbeks, Kazakhs or Kyrgyz, although closely related to the latter. Some dialects of Fergana Kipchak seem closely related to the Kipchak–Nogay languages.

Fergana Kipchak may still be alive today in the form of southern dialect of Kyrgyz language, albeit under significant influence of the standard language within Kyrgyzstan borders. Pamir Kyrgyz dialect might either be the Fergana Kipchak language itself, or its direct descendant.

== See also ==
- Kipchaks
- Kipchak languages
- Cumans
- Cuman language
