= Kyrgyz in Pakistan =

Total population
- 6,000 (2023)

Regions with significant populations
- Chitral (Broghil Valley); Gilgit-Baltistan (Gojal)

Languages
- Kyrgyz (Pamir Kyrgyz) · Urdu

Religion
- Sunni Islam

The Kyrgyz in Pakistan number around 6,000, most of whom reside in the far north of the country, specifically in the Broghil Valley of Chitral and Gojal in Gilgit-Baltistan. Kyrgyz is the only Turkic language native to Pakistan. The Kyrgyz in Pakistan speak the Pamiri Kyrgyz dialect, also known as Black Kyrgyz (قاره قیرغیز). Historically, they have been a dominant group in the Gojal Valley of Gilgit-Baltistan.

Pakistan's Broghil Pass, located between Chitral and the Wakhan Corridor, has been an important route for the Kyrgyz people. Some Kyrgyz in Pakistan trace their origins to Uzgen in western Kyrgyzstan. Additionally, many who had previously settled in the Little Pamir valley of the Wakhan Corridor in Afghanistan fled to Pakistan following the Saur Revolution in 1978, leaving behind much of their wealth and livestock.

== History ==
Kyrgyz have had a long history in Pakistan. Historically, Kyrgyz nomads dominated the Gojal Valley of Pakistan. During the 1980s, as many as 1,129 Kyrgyz refugees in Pakistan were subsequently allowed asylum and resettlement in eastern Turkey.

Up to this day, Kyrgyz farmers and herders from Pamir (Afghanistan) frequently visit the bordering Hunza valley of Pakistan to engage in livestock breeding and limited barter trade with entrepreneurs.

Like other Central Asian expatriates, many Kyrgyz migrants apply for Pakistani nationality and identity cards, often deliberately losing or hiding their passports in the process. According to Pakistani interior officials, they take advantage of their cultural assimilation by introducing themselves as Pakistan-based Pashtuns living in other countries who came to the country to spend vacation and "lost their credentials."

The Kyrgyz in Pakistan have an active involvement in trade and maintain a broad network of business companies in various states, including neighbouring China. They also have played an extensive role in promoting and assisting the development of tourism in Kyrgyzstan.

Many of the Pakistanis in Kyrgyzstan who fled the 2010 South Kyrgyzstan riots brought back Kyrgyz spouses and families to Pakistan with them. One of the obstacles faced by their Kyrgyz relatives included registration of travel documents; most did not have proper documentation and some were issued visas by the Federal Investigation Agency for only three days, resulting in people being declared illegal immigrants.

In October 2010, several dozen Kyrgyz nationals, mostly diplomats living in Islamabad and other cities, took part in voting for the parliamentary elections running in Kyrgyzstan. The polling was organised at the local embassy.

== Wakhan Kyrgyz refugees ==
Kyrgyz from Wakhan region of Afghanistan moved to Pakistan in the 1970s. Nearly 1,100 of these were accepted by Turkey to settle in Ulupamir (or “Great Pamir” in Kyrgyz), their resettlement village in Van Province.

== See also ==
- Kyrgyzstan–Pakistan relations
- Pakistanis in Kyrgyzstan
- Kyrgyz people#In Afghanistan
