= Pecheneg language =

Extinct Turkic language of Eastern Europe

Pecheneg
- Patzinak
- Native to: Pecheneg khanates
- Region: Central Europe, Eastern Europe, Southeast Europe and Central Asia
- Ethnicity: Pechenegs
- Era: 7th-12th century
- Language family: Turkic: Common Turkic; (classification disputed); Pecheneg

Language codes
- ISO 639-3: xpc
- Glottolog: pech1242

Pecheneg is an extinct Turkic language spoken by the Pechenegs in Eastern Europe (parts of Southern Ukraine, Southern Russia, Moldova, Romania and Hungary) in the 7th–12th centuries. However, names in this language (Beke, Wochun, Lechk, etc.) are reported from Hatvan until 1290.

== Classification ==
Due to poor documentation and the absence of any descendant languages, linguists have been prevented from making an accurate classification. It is placed as unclassified in the Kipchak language family in Glottolog and in the Kipchak–Cuman language family in Linguist List.

Byzantine princess Anna Komnene asserts that the Pechenegs and Cumans spoke the same language, while Mahmud al-Kashgari considered their language to be a corrupted form of Turkic. Most contemporary researchers conclude that they spoke a Common Turkic language.
