= Trukhmen dialect =

Turkmen dialect spoken in Stavropol region, Russia

Trukhmen
- Native to: Russia
- Region: Stavropol krai
- Ethnicity: Trukhmens
- Native speakers: 9,357 in Stavropol (2021)
- Language family: Turkic: Oghuz; Eastern Oghuz; Turkmen; Trukhmen

Language codes
- ISO 639-3: –
- Glottolog: None

Trukhmen (Russian: Трухме́нский язык, romanized: Trukhmensky yazyk), is a dialect of the Turkmen language spoken amongst the North Caucasus Turkmen of Russia's Stavropol krai.

Trukhmen preserves many characteristic Turkmen features, while also showing influence from by the Nogai language (especially in phonetics, grammatical structures and, to some extent, in vocabulary) as well as from Russian. The main cause of dialectal differences in Trukhmen is the contact of its speakers with other ethnic groups, such as Nogais, Tatars and Kalmyks. Members of the North Caucasus Turkmen community have published works in the Turkmen language since at least the early 20th century.

== Sources ==
- Condill, Kit. "Comparative Nationalisms and Bibliographic Black Holes: The Case of the Turkmen of the North Caucasus" (PDF). Cambridge Core. Cambridge University Press.
