= Argu languages =

Language family

Argu
- Geographic distribution: Central Asia, South-central Asia, Iran
- Ethnicity: Arghu, Khalaj people
- Linguistic classification: Turkic: Common Turkic; Argu
- Subdivisions: Khalaj

Language codes
- ISO 639-3: klj Khalaj
- Glottolog: turk1303 (Khalaj Turkic)

Argu, or the Arghu languages, are a branch of Common Turkic languages along with Oghuz, Kipchak, Karluk and Siberian Turkic. Unlike other branches, this group is not multilingual, and the historical Argu language and its descendant Khalaj are the only languages of this group.

The Arghu (اَرْغوُ), were a bilingual group of Turkic tribes in the 11th century. The first and only mention of the Argu tribes and Argu language was by Al-Kashgari. He wrote that they lived among the mountains and that is why they were called Argu, meaning "in between". In the same period (9th/10th century), the name Khalaj was also recorded by travelers. With the discovery of modern Khalajs, it is found that language of Khalajs is the same language as Argu language in the Dīwān Lughāt al-Turk.

Some of the linguistic reasons demonstrate that Khalaj is a descendant of Arghu:

1. The Old Turkic -ny(-) sound is preserved as -n(-) in both Arghu and Khalaj.
2. There is labialization in both. (E.g. bardum, käldüm instead of bardïm, keldim)
3. According to Al-Kashgarî, Argu tribes use the word 'dag' to mean 'not'. The only Turkic language that uses the word 'dag' to mean 'not' today is Khalaj. The Oghuz use the words from *degül, and others *ermeŕ.
4. Arghu has δ instead of z. This is also seen in Khalaj.

Mahmud Al-Kashgarî also mentioned the Khalaj (Karakhanid: خَلَج) in his Divan, but he did not record them as Argu. In the Turkmen article, it is recorded that Khalajs are Turkmen but that they do not consider themselves such. "The Turkmens are actually twenty-four tribes, but the Khalajs, which are made up of two tribes, are not considered Oghuz themselves, as they are sometimes separated from them[.]" Argu tribes lived in Talas, Balasagun and Sayram regions. They were adjacent to the Turkmen. According to al-Kashgari, the Turkmen and Argu were influenced by each other's languages.

The name Khalaj was recorded by Arab geographers around the Syr Darya in Afghanistan in the 9-10th centuries. Their winter quarters remained in the Talas Region. This is the area where the Argu were located in the 11th century. Al-Khwarizmi, along with Kancina, shows the Khalaj as the remaining tribes from the Hephthalites. The Khalaj must have migrated to Iran later. Their homeland, where they were first recorded, is south Central Asia.
