= Armeno-Kipchak language =

Extinct Turkic language of Crimea

Armeno-Kipchak
- Xıpçaχ tili, bizim til, Tatarça
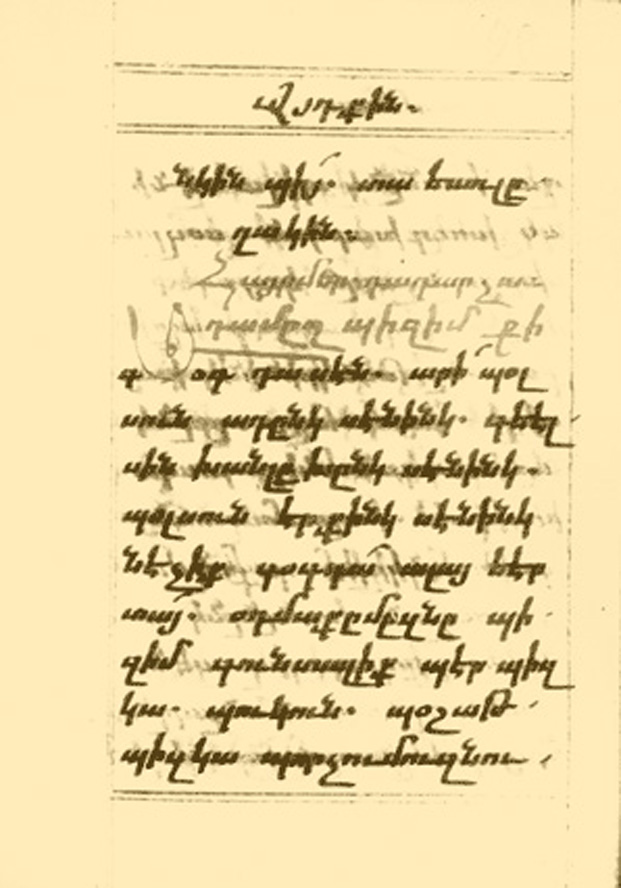
- 17th century manuscript of a prayer in Armeno-Kipchak.
- Native to: Polish-Lithuanian Commonwealth
- Region: Crimea
- Ethnicity: Armenians (Armeno–Kipchaks)
- Extinct: 17th century
- Language family: Turkic: Common Turkic; Kipchak; Kipchak–Cuman; Armeno-Kipchak
- Writing system: Armenian script

Language codes
- ISO 639-3: None (mis)
- Glottolog: None

Armeno-Kipchak (Xıpçaχ tili, Tatarça) was a Turkic language belonging to the Kipchak branch of the family that was spoken among Armenians in Crimea during the 14th–15th centuries and later in Armenian communities in the Polish-Lithuanian Commonwealth. The language is documented in a number of texts dating to the 16th–17th centuries, written in the Polish-Lithuanian Commonwealth in the Armenian script. Armeno-Kipchak resembles the language of Codex Cumanicus, which was compiled in the 13th century.

Speakers of the Armeno-Kipchak were Armenians who adopted the Kipchak language considered to be linguistically assimilated Armenians. Armeno-Kipchak-speakers generally identified as Armenian.

== History ==
Armenians began settling in Crimea in the 11th century and adopted the Kipchak language in the 14th and 15th centuries.

From Crimea, mainly the city of Feodosia, they resettled to parts of modern-day Ukraine, Poland, Romania, and Moldova. Written monuments from Armenian Apostolic Church centres located in these regions are the reason the Armeno-Kipchak language is known.

The Armenians of Crimea maintained Armenian as their liturgical language only. In Galicia and Podolia, Armenians wrote their legal documents in Armeno-Kipchak, using the Armenian script. These Armenians continued to use Armeno-Kipchak when writing letters until the end of the 17th century, when they adopted Polish.

In these monuments, the language refers to itself in three ways: with the older term хыпчах тили (en: Kipchak language), the possessive construction бизим тил (en: our language), and the later comparative terminological combination татарча (en: in Tatar), which became widespread thanks to translators familiar with Crimean Tatar.

== Linguistic Features ==
Armeno-Kipchak has 9 vowels: а, ӓ, е, ы, и, о, ӧ, у, ӱ.

It contained many loanwords from Ukrainian, Polish and Latin, especially in translated texts, as well as Iranian and Arabic influences.

The grammatical system was greatly affected by in the influence of Slavonic languages.

== Literature ==
The surviving Armeno-Kipchak texts (112 texts in total) were written in the Armenian script between 1521 and 1669. They consist of tens of thousands of pages. These texts include:

- 28 registry books for the Voytov Armenian law court of Kamentsa-Podol'skovo (1572-1663)
- Financial and metrical books for the Lviv Armenian clerical courts (1572-1663)
- The Kamianets Chronicle which describes the Battle of Cecora and the Battle of Khotyn
- The Venetian Chronicle
- The Polish Chronicle
- A translation of The Lawcode (Datastanagirk') of Mkhitar Gosh which had been approved by the Polish king Sigismund I the Old in 1519 and contains a large amount of additional files and commentaries
- 5 Armenian-Kipchak dictionaries and a few glossaries
- 'Secrets of the Philosopher's Stone' by Andrei Torosovich (1626)

== See also ==
- Crimean Tatar language
- Karaim language
- Krymchak language
- Urum language
- Armenians in Ukraine
- Armenians in Poland
