= Ortatürk =

Pan-Turkic auxiliary language with statistical vocabulary

- Öztürk tili/Öztürkçe
- Ortatürk tili
- Created by: Baxtiyar Kärimov (Бахтияр Каримов), Shoahmad Mutalov (Ш. Муталов)
- Date: 1992 (first version), 2005 (second version), 2008 (simplified version)
- Purpose: Constructed language: Ortatürk
- Sources: Turkic languages

Language codes
- ISO 639-3: –

Ortatürk (lit. 'Middle Turkic') or Öztürkçe (lit. 'Core Turkic') is a pan-Turkic auxiliary language. It is described as an averaged language. It employs a statistical approach to construct a common lexicon.

In 1992, Karimov and Mutalov devised a formula to create an averaged word from the words used in a language family. They demonstrated this for Turkic, Slavonic, Iranian and Romance languages, but it is applicable to any group of related languages.

They used 5 Turkic languages; Azerbaijani, Kazakh, Tatar, Turkish and Uzbek. In 2005, they added Kyrgyz, Turkmen and Uyghur languages to the comparison algorithm. The original proposal omitted distant Turkic branches, i.e., the Oghuric, Siberian Turkic or Argu branches.

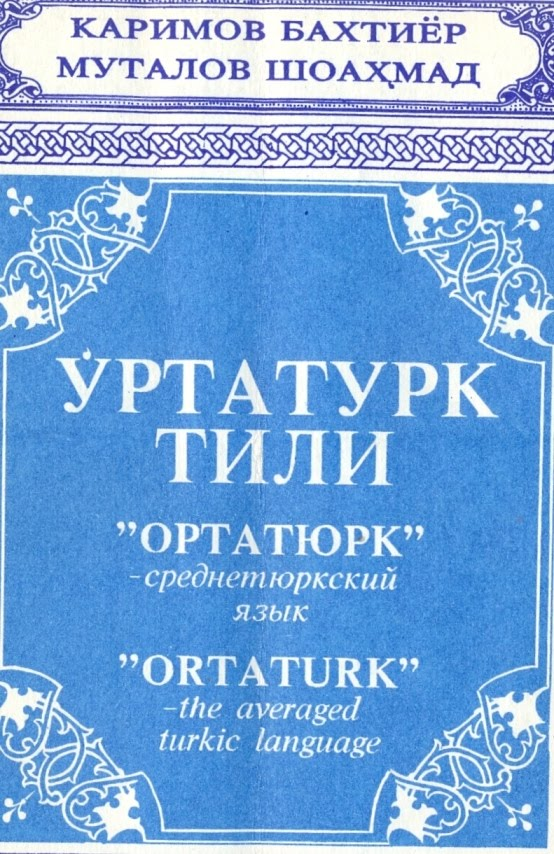
1992 edition of Ortatürk Tili

On 18 March 2008, during 5th Kurultai, the World Assembly of Turkic Peoples decided to found International Institute of the Language Ortaturk (Anatürk). VATN created an online program to calculate median words for Ortatürk. It is a simplified version of Karimov and Mutalov's proposal. It generates words based on the "double majority" principle (by total number of native speakers and by number of languages). It uses data representing 25 Turkic languages with a total of 160 million speakers.

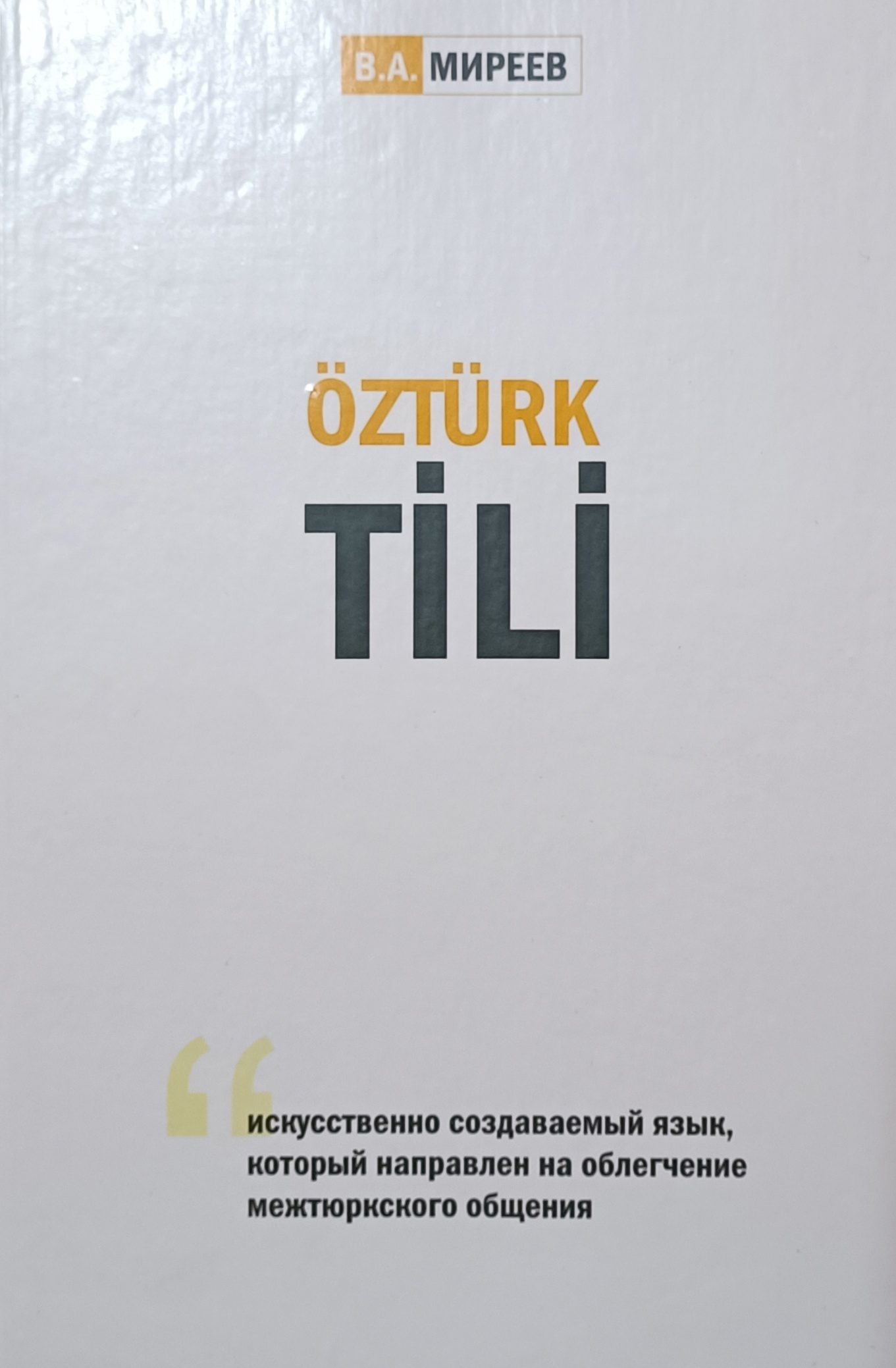
Öztürk Tili

In 2020s, Turkic speakers created an online group on VK to promote Ortatürk amongst Turkic speakers. Later, they changed the project's name to "Öztürkçe". In 2023, V.A. Mireev published "Öztürk Tili" with grammar, dictionary and translations. It has more than 16,000 words in the dictionary section. An online dictionary is created in Glosbe platform with "mis_ort" code.
