= Lop dialect =

Dialect of the Uyghur language

Lop
- ليوپ تېلې / Lyop tëlë / Лёп теле
- Native to: China
- Region: Xinjiang Uyghur Autonomous Region
- Native speakers: (undated figure of 25,000)
- Language family: Turkic: Common Turkic; Karluk; Uyghur; Lop

Language codes
- ISO 639-3: –
- Glottolog: lopn1238 Lopnor
- ELP: Lopnor Uighur

Lop, also known as Lopnor or Lopnur, is a Turkic dialect spoken in the Lopnor region of Xinjiang, China. Lop speakers are officially classified as ethnic Uyghurs by the Chinese government.

== Classification ==
Lop belongs to the Karluk branch of Turkic languages, along with Uyghur and Uzbek. Its status as a distinct language from Uyghur is disputed. Although it has some features that differentiate it from standard Uyghur, it is considered by some linguists to be one of its dialects.

== Phonology ==
Consonants:
| | | Labial | Alveolar | Palato- alveolar | Palatal | Velar | Uvular | Glottal |
|---|---|---|---|---|---|---|---|---|
| Nasal | | m | n | | | ŋ | | |
| Plosive | unvoiced | p | t | | | k | q | |
| Plosive | voiced | b | d | | | g | | |
| Fricative | unvoiced | | s | ʃ | ç | x~χ | | h |
| Fricative | voiced | v | z | ʒ | ʝ | ɣ~ʁ | | h |
| Approximant | | | l | | j | | | h |
| Tap | | | ɾ | | | | | |

Vowels:
| | Front | | Back |
| | unrounded | rounded | Back |
|---|---|---|---|
| High | i | y | u |
| Mid | e | ø | o |
| Low | æ | | a |
