= Ardabil dialect =

Dialect of Azerbaijani spoken in Aradabil

Ardabili dialect
- Native to: Ardabil, Iran; Azerbaijan
- Region: Ardabil, Iran
- Language family: Turkic: Common Turkic; Oghuz; Western Oghuz; Azerbaijani; South Azerbaijani; Ardabili dialect

Language codes
- ISO 639-3: –

Ardabil dialect is a dialect of Azerbaijani that is used by people from and around the Iranian city of Ardabil. The dialect has also been recorded in Alni, Astara, Germi, Hir, Irdemousa, Khalkhal, Kiwi, Meshginshahr, Namin, and Sareyn.

The speakers of Ardabili dialect are estimated to be more than one million people, most of whom live in Ardabil or its surrounding areas.

== Accents ==
Ardabili dialect in the city of Ardabil itself is also divided into three categories, which are distinguished from each other by a slight difference:

The accent of the six neighborhoods includes the local context of the people of Ardabil city who have been living in this city since ancient times, mostly living in Gazran, Towi, Ochdekan, Pir Abdul Malik, Sarcheshme and Ali Qapo neighborhoods.

Northern accent: It includes the context of Ardabil immigrants who mainly migrated to Ardabil from the northern areas of the province and settled in this city.

Dialect of the surrounding neighborhoods: It includes the population structure that mainly migrated to the city from different areas of Ardabil county.

The Ardabil dialect is mostly similar to the dialect of the southern regions of Azerbaijan, and during the Safavid rule in the Middle Ages, it had the greatest impact on all the Azeri dialects of the Caucasus and Azerbaijan.

== Linguistic grouping ==
Azerbaijani is one of the Turkic languages and the language of most of the Azeri regions of Iran, including Azerbaijan. This language is placed next to Istanbul Turkish and Gagauz in the western branch of the Oghuz language group. Khorasani Turkish and Turkmen form the eastern sub-branch and Qashqai language under the southern branch of the Oghuz languages.
