= Peter E. Hook =

American linguist (born 1942)

Peter E. Hook (born 1942) is professor emeritus in the Department of Asian Languages and Cultures at the University of Michigan.

== Biography ==
Hook was born in southwestern Connecticut and attended public and private school in northeastern Ohio. He graduated from Harvard College in 1964 and went to India as a member of the American Peace Corps before earning his PhD in Indo-Aryan linguistics at the University of Pennsylvania. He is married to Prof. Hsin-hsin Liang who directs the Chinese language program at the University of Virginia. They have a daughter Leise and a son Lawrence.

== Academic work ==
Hook's academic interest has been in the linguistic description of languages belonging to the Indo-Aryan family in South Asia, and more broadly in their place in Masica's Indo-Turanian linguistic area. At Michigan, he taught Hindi at all levels, occasionally other South Asian languages, along with courses in linguistics and South Asian literature for three and a half decades, and published on both Indo-Aryan languages and linguistics.

His chief contributions are The Compound Verb in Hindi and numerous articles on the compound verb and other syntactic and semantic phenomena in western Indo-Aryan languages and dialects spoken in North India, West India, and Pakistan: Kashmiri, Marathi, Gujarati, Rajasthani, Shina, and Sanskrit. After Jules Bloch in his La Formation de la Langue Marathe, Hook was the first to realize that Kashmiri, not unlike German, has V2 word order. More recent publications have refined the notion of South Asia as a linguistic area as first adumbrated by Murray Emeneau and - with the addition of Central Asia and Eastern Asia - expanded by Colin Masica.

== Publications ==
- Semantic neutrality in complex predicates in East and South Asian languages. (with Prashant Pardeshi and Hsin-Hsin Liang). In Linguistics 50: 605–632.
- Searching for the Goddess: A study of sensory and other impersonal causative expressions in the Shina of Gilgit. (with Muhammad Amin Zia). Yearbook of South Asian Languages and Linguistics 2005. Berlin: Mouton de Gruyter. pp 165–188. ISBN 978-3110186185
- Where do Compound Verbs Come from? And where are they Going?. In Bhaskararao, P., and K.V. Subbarao, Eds. South Asia yearbook 2001: Papers from the symposium on South Asian languages: contact, convergence and typology. Delhi: SAGE Publications. Pp. 101–30.
- The compound verb in Chinese and Hindi-Urdu and the plausibility of macro linguistic areas. (with Hsin-hsin Liang). In Old and New Perspectives on South Asian Languages: Grammar and Semantics, Colin Masica, Ed. Delhi: Motilal Banarsidass. pp. 105–126. ISBN 978-8120832084
- Kesar of Layul: A Central Asian Epic in the Shina of Gultari. In Studies in Pakistani Popular Culture. Wm. Hanaway and Wilma Heston, Eds. Lahore: Sang-e-Meel and Lok Virsa. pp. 121–183. ISBN 978-9693507027
- The Emergence of Perfective Aspect in Indo-Aryan. In Approaches to Grammaticalization. Vol. 2. B. Heine and E. Traugott, Eds. Amsterdam and Philadelphia: John Benjamins. pp. 59–89. ISBN 902722899X, 9789027228994
- A Note on Expressions of Involuntary Experience in the Shina of Skardu. Bulletin of the School of Oriental and African Studies 53:77-82.
- The Marriage of Heroines and the Definition of a Literary Area in South and Central Asia. In Aryan and Non-Aryan in India, M. M. Deshpande and P. E. Hook, Eds., Karoma. 1979. pp. 35–54. ISBN 978-0891480457
- Linguistic Areas: Getting at the Grain of History. In Festschrift for Henry Hoenigswald, On the Occasion of his Seventieth Birthday. George Cardona and Norman H. Zide, Eds. Tuebingen: Gunter Narr Verlag. pp. 155–168. ISBN 3878083653, 9783878083658
- Hindi Structures: Intermediate Level. Ann Arbor: Center for South and Southeast Asian Studies, University of Michigan. 1979. ISBN 9780891480167
- The Compound Verb in Hindi. Ann Arbor: Center for South and Southeast Asian Studies, University of Michigan. 1974. ISBN 978-0891480518
