= Pamir Kyrgyz dialect =

Kyrgyz dialect spoken in Pakistan and Afghanistan

Pamir Kyrgyz
- پامیری قیرغیز
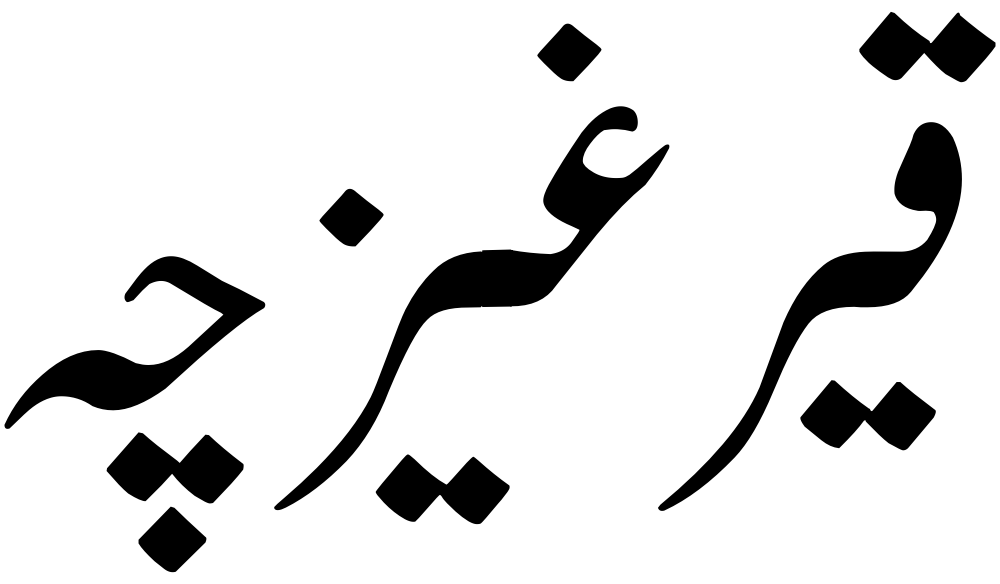
- Pamiri Kyrgyz in Nastaliq
- Native to: Pakistan, Afghanistan
- Region: Chitral, Gojal, Wakhan
- Native speakers: 6,000 (in Pakistan) (2023)
- Language family: Turkic: Common Turkic; Kipchak; Kyrgyz–Kipchak; Kyrgyz; Pamir Kyrgyz

Language codes
- ISO 639-3: –
- Glottolog: None

Pamir Kyrgyz (Note: Kyrgyz: پامیر قیرغیزچه, romanized: Pamir Kyrgyzcha, cyrillized: Памир Кыргызча, locally [paˈmiɾ qɯɾˈɢɯz.tʃa]) is a dialect of the Kyrgyz language natively spoken in the Chitral district and Gojal Valley of Pakistan and Wakhan Corridor of Afghanistan. It has been evolving into a distinct dialect of Kyrgyz due to its isolation. The dialect is known by its speakers as Black Kyrgyz (قاره قیرغیز, Kara Kyrgyz).

== Loanwords ==
Pamir Kyrgyz uses many loanwords from Dari Persian, which unlike Kyrgyz from Kyrgyzstan, makes it hard to understand the language due to Kyrgyz from Kyrgyzstan using Russian loanwords.

== Literacy ==
Literacy rate from the Kyrgyz of Pamir has increased, with many proposing an alphabet for it. The Agha Khan has started funding schools for the Pamir Kyrgyz in Afghanistan for Dari Persian, Pashto, and their native Pamir Kyrgyz language.

== Phonology ==
The Pamiri Kyrgyz dialect uses long and hard vowels unlike the Kyrgyz in Kyrgyzstan.

=== Vowels ===
	Front		Back	
	unr.	rnd.	unr.	rnd.
Close	i	y	ɯ	u
Mid	e	ø		o
Open	æ		ɑ	

=== Consonants ===
Kyrgyz consonants
		Labial	Dental/ alveolar	Post- alveolar	Dorsal	Uvular
Nasal		m	n		ŋ	
Plosive	voiceless	p	t		k	q
Plosive	voiced	b	d		ɡ	ɢ
Affricate	voiceless			t͡ʃ		
Affricate	voiced			d͡ʒ		
Fricative	voiceless	f	s	ʃ	x	
Fricative	voiced	v	z			
Approximant			l		j	
Trill			r			
