= Karachay-Balkar =

Kipchak Turkic language of the North Caucasus

Karachay–Balkar
- Mountain Turkic
- къарачай-малкъар тил qaraçay-malqar til таулу тил tawlu til
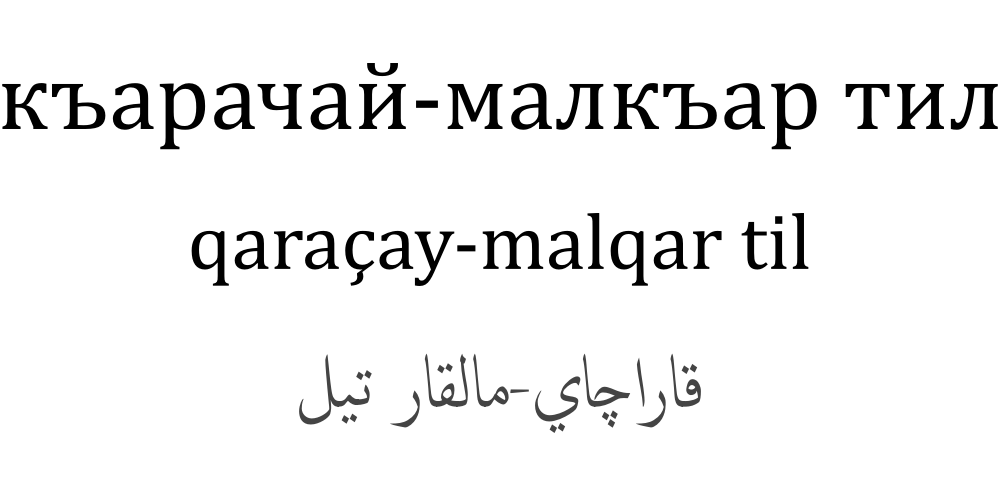
- Native to: North Caucasus
- Region: Kabardino-Balkaria, Karachay–Cherkessia, Turkey
- Ethnicity: Karachays, Balkars
- Native speakers: 340,000 in Russia (2021 census)
- Language family: Turkic: Common Turkic; Kipchak; Kipchak–Cuman; Karachay–Balkar
- Dialects: Karachay; Balkar
- Writing system: Cyrillic; Latin in diaspora Arabic historically

Official status
- Official language in: Kabardino-Balkaria (Russia); Karachay-Cherkessia (Russia)

Language codes
- ISO 639-2: krc
- ISO 639-3: krc
- Glottolog: kara1465
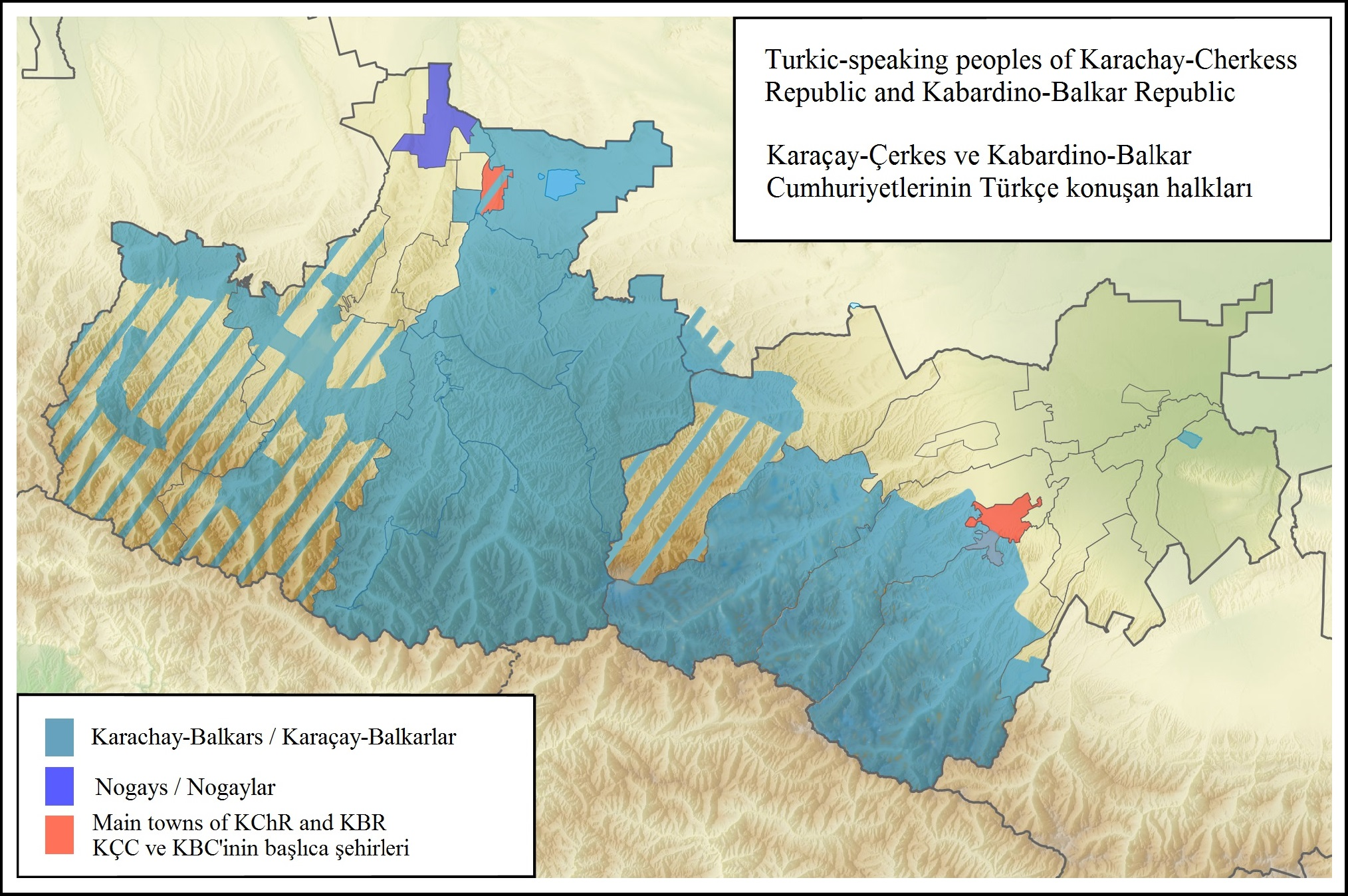
- Map of Turkic-speaking groups in Kabardino-Balkaria

- Karachay-Balkar is classified as Vulnerable by the UNESCO Atlas of the World's Languages in Danger

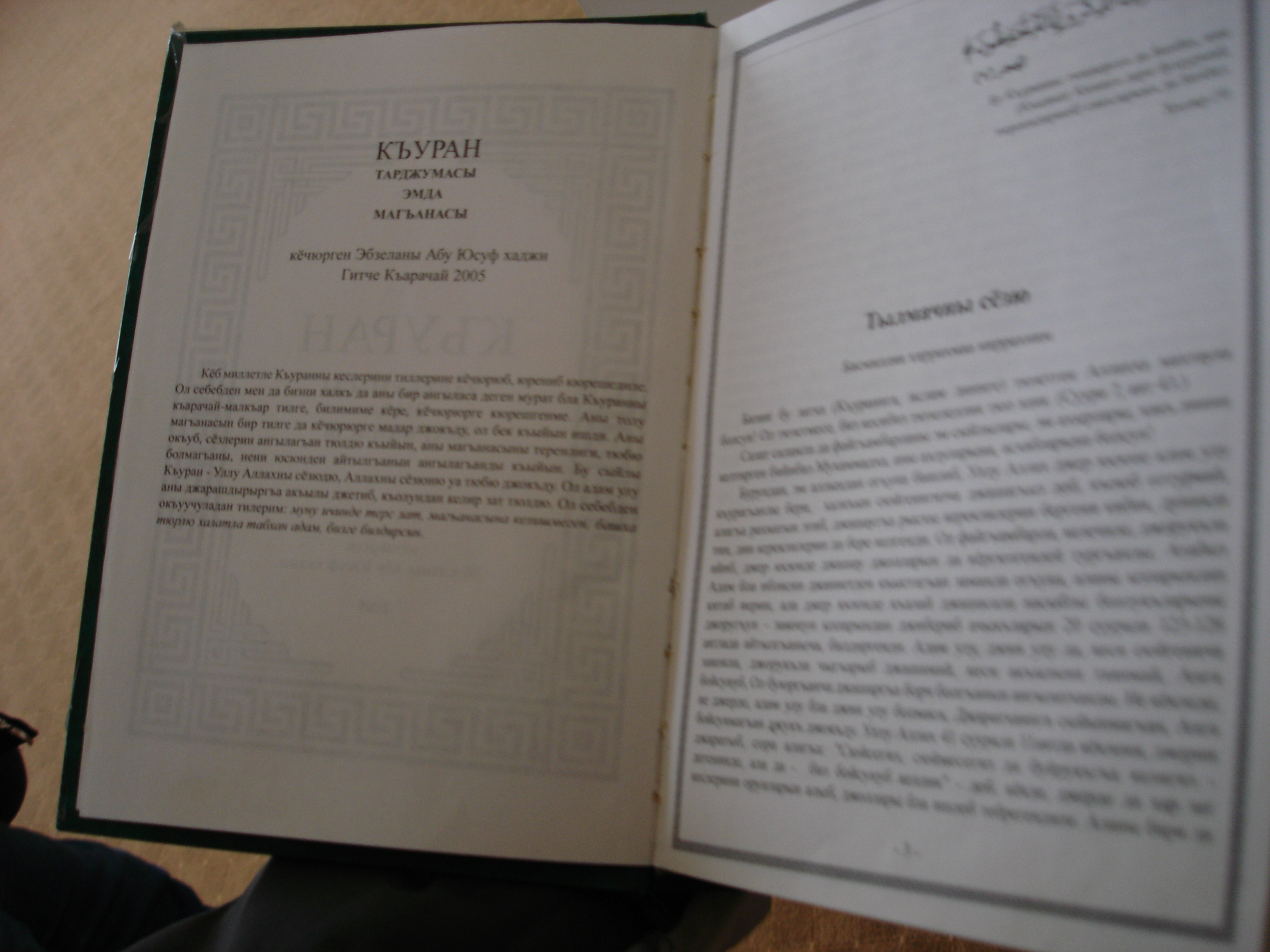
Karachay–Balkar-language version of the Koran

Karachay–Balkar (къарачай-малкъар тил, qaraçay-malqar til), often referred to as the "mountaineer language" (таулу тил, tawlu til) by its speakers, is a Turkic language spoken by the Karachays and Balkars in Kabardino-Balkaria and Karachay-Cherkessia, European Russia, as well as by an immigrant population in Afyonkarahisar Province, Turkey. It is divided into two dialects: Karachay-Baksan-Chegem, which pronounces two phonemes as /tʃ/ and /dʒ/ and Malkar, which pronounces the corresponding phonemes as /ts/ and /z/. The modern Karachay–Balkar written language is based on the Karachay–Baksan–Chegem dialect. The language is closely related to Kumyk.

== Phonology ==
Vowels
	Front	Back
Close	i y	ɯ u
Mid	e ø	o
Open		ɑ

Consonants
	Labial	Alveolar	Palatal	Velar	Uvular	Glottal
Plosive	p b	t d		k ɡ	(q) (ɢ)	
Fricative	[f]	s z	ʃ	x (ɣ)		h
Affricate		[ts]	tʃ dʒ			
Nasal	m	n		ŋ		
Liquid		l r				
Approximant	w		j			

Parentheses indicate allophones, brackets indicate phonemes from loanwords.

== Orthography ==
Historically, the Arabic alphabet had been used by first writers until 1924. Handwritten manuscripts of the Balkar poet Kazim Mechiev and other examples of literature have been preserved to this day. The first printed books in Karachay–Balkar were published in the beginning of the 20th century. In 1910, the prominent educator and the father of literary Karachay-Balkar, Ismail Akbaev, based in Temir-Khan-Shura (Buynaksk), first standardized the Karachay-Balkar Arabic alphabet and published a book titled "A teaching aid for initial teaching of children to write and read". In 1915, a syndicate of teachers from the religious and secular schools of Karachay commissioned Akbaev to develop a national script. The result of this was a primer published in 1916, titled "Ana tili" (آنا تیلی).

After the October Revolution, initially as part of the soviet policy of standardization of school curriculum and public education, the standard Arabic alphabet for Karachay-Balkar was refined once more, in the 2nd edition of "Ana tili" (آنا تیلی) being published by Ismail Akbaev in 1921.

Later, as part of a new state campaign of Latinization Karachay and Balkar educators developed a new alphabet based on Latin letters, being officially adopted in 1924.

In the 1930s, the official Soviet policy was revised and the process of Cyrillization of Soviet languages was started. In 1937–38 the new alphabet based on Cyrillic letters was officially adopted, which remains the official alphabet for Karachay-Balkar up till today.

=== Cyrillic alphabet ===
Modern Karachay–Balkar Cyrillic alphabet:

А а [a]	Б б [b]	В в [v]	Г г [g]	Гъ гъ [ʁ]	Д д [d]	Дж дж ^{(1)} [dʒ]	Е е ^{(2)} [je]/[e]
Ё ё ^{(3)} [ø]/[jo]	Ж ж ^{(1)} [ʒ]	З з [z]	И и [i]	Й й [j]	К к [k]	Къ къ [q]/[ɢ]	Л л [l]
М м [m]	Н н [n]	Нг нг ^{(4)} [ŋ]	О о [o]	П п [p]	Р р [r]	С с [s]	Т т [t]
У у ^{(5)} [u]/[w]	Ф ф [f]	Х х ^{(6)} [x]/[χ]/[h]	Ц ц [ts]	Ч ч [tʃ]	Ш ш [ʃ]	Щ щ [ɕː]	Ъ ъ [∅]
Ы ы [ɯ]	Ь ь [◌ʲ]	Э э ^{(2)} [e]	Ю ю ^{(3)} [y]/[ju]	Я я ^{(3)} [æ]/[ja]			

==== Notes ====
1. In Kabardino-Balkaria, ж is written instead of дж, corresponding to the dialectical variation in the pronunciation.
2. Word-initially, the letter е would be pronounced as [je], whereas the letter э would be pronounced as e. The letter э is not used in the middle or end of words, in native Karachay-Balkar words.
3. The letters ё, ю, and я are pronounced as vowels [ø], [y], and [æ] respectively in native Karachay-Balkar words, but are pronounced as [jo], [ju], and [ja] in Russian loanwords.
4. Karachay-Cherkessia, they write нъ instead of нг.
5. In some publications, especially during the Soviet period, the letter у́ or ў is used for the sound [w].
6. The letter х can have a variety of pronunciations. In native Karachay-Balkar words, it is pronounced as [χ]. In Russian loanwords, as [x], and in loanwords of Arabic or Persian origin, as either [x] or [h].

In a new project approved in May 1961, the alphabet was modified to reduce the use of digraphs and non-orthodox usage of Russian letters, featuring the unique letters Ғ ғ, Җ җ, Қ қ, Ң ң, Ө ө, Ў ў, Ү ү. It was nullified and the normal Cyrillic alphabet was restored in 1964.

=== Latin alphabet ===
Karachay–Balkar Latin alphabet:

A a [a]	B ʙ [b]	C c [dʒ]	Ç ç [tʃ]	D d [d]	E e [e]	F f [f]	G g [g]
Ƣ ƣ [ʁ]	H h ^{(1)} [h]	I i [i]	J j [j]	K k [k]	Q q [q]/[ɢ]	L l [l]	M m [m]
N n [n]	Ꞑ ꞑ [ŋ]	O o [o]	Ɵ ɵ ^{(2)} [ø]	P p [p]	R r [r]	S s [s]	Ş ş ^{(3)} [ʃ]
Ꞩ ꞩ ^{(4)} [ts]	T t [t]	Ь ь [ɯ]	U u [u]	V v [v]	W w ^{(4)} [w]	Y y [y]	X x ^{(1)} [x]/[χ]/[h]
Xh xh ^{(1)} [χ]	Z z [z]	Ƶ ƶ [ʒ]					

==== Notes ====
1. The letter h was included at first to represent loanwords of Arabic and Persian origin containing the letters 'ھ and ح, having the sound [h]. The letter x initially represented the sound [x], either Arabic and Persian loanwords containing the letter خ or Russian loanwords containing the letter х. The digraph xh was included to represent native Karachay-Balkar sound [χ], which was occasionally written in Karachay Arabic alphabet as حۤ. These letters were merged into the single letter x in 1924. The letter h was added again in 1924, but removed again in 1934.
2. The letter ɵ was initially proposed to be œ.
3. The sound [ʃ] was initially to be written as sh.
4. The letters ꞩ and w were added in 1934.

In the 1990s, with the fall of the Soviet Union, efforts were made to revert Karachay-Balkar to the Latin alphabet. Specifically, a newspaper named "Üyge igikik" was published during the 1990s. The alphabet of the publication was very similar to modern Turkish and it contained the following letters:

- A a, B b, C c, Ç ç, D d, E e, F f, G g, Ğ ğ, H h, İ i, I ı, J j, K k, L l, M m, N n, O o, Ö ö, P p, Q q, R r, S s, Ş ş, T t, U u, Ü ü, V v, W w, X x, Y y, Z z

=== Arabic alphabet ===
Prior to 1925, for centuries, the Perso-Arabic script was the basis of the literary language among Karachay-Balkar. Be it in he form of Ottoman Turkish in the Caucasus and among the diaspora in Turkey, or be it the Cuman language, the Turkic lingua franca of the Caucasus and Southern Russia for a few centuries, and more closely related to Karachay-Balkar itself.

From the early 20th century, there was attempts to bring the writing closer to the spoken dialects and languages among the Karachay and Balkar. As mentioned, the first successful national attempt at standardization of the alphabet was done in 1916. The second and final attempt was done in 1921, in a published primer, both done by Islael Akbaev.

In the first iteration, Arabic maintained the original spelling, with homophone letters continued being used and vowels not fully shown, just as in Arabic orthography. In the second attempt, the use of vowels became more consistent and fully-encompassing, the initial alef letter was dropped (similar to Kazakh Arabic alphabet in the same era. Furthermore, the Arabic letters that had the same pronunciation in Karachay-Balkar were dropped and consolidated (For example the letters ث and ص were dropped in favour of the letter س);with the exception of the letter ع representing a glottal stop [ʔ], and the letters that represent the sounds [h~χ].

The table below lists the 1921 iteration of the Karachay-Balkar Arabic Alphabet, containing 34 letters.

ا ـا [a]	ب [b]	پ [p]	ت [t]	ج [dʒ]	ح ^{(1)} [h]	خ [x]
چ [tʃ]	حۤ ^{(1)} [χ]	د [d]	ر [r]	ز [z]	ژ [ʒ]	س [s]
ش [ʃ]	ع [ʔ]	غ [ʁ]	ف [f]	ق [q]/[ɢ]	ك [k]	ڭ [ŋ]
گ [g]	ل [l]	م [m]	ن [n]	و [v]/[w]/[u]	وٓ [o]	ۆ [ø]
ۉ [y]	یـ ی [j]/[i]	ىٕـ ىٕ [ɯ]	ھ ^{(1)} [h]	ئە ـە ە [e]	ئ [ʔ]	

==== Note ====
1. In this iteration of the Arabic alphabet, the letter ح was split into two, an unmarked letter, and one that is marked with maddah or tilde, حۤ. The letter ح was to be used for writing Arabic loanwords and the letter ھ for writing foreign loanwords (Arabic, and also Persian and other foreign languages), representing the sound [h]. The letter حۤ was used for writing of native Karachay-Balkar words, and it was to distinguish the [χ] pronunciation of the letter ح in these words with the pronunciation of this letter in Arabic loanwords.

=== Comparison chart ===
Perso-Arabic (1920–1924)	Latin (1924–1938)	Cyrillic (1961–1964)	Cyrillic (1937–1961), (1964–present)
ا	A a	А а	А а
ب	B ʙ	Б б	Б б
و	V v	В в	В в
گ	G g	Г г	Г г
غ	Ƣ ƣ	Ғ ғ	Гъ гъ
د	D d	Д д	Д д
ە	E e	Е е	Е е
ۆ	Ɵ ɵ	Ө ө, Ё ё	Ё ё
ژ	Ƶ ƶ	Ж ж	Ж ж
ج	Ç ç	Җ җ	Дж дж (Ж ж)
ز	Z z	З з	З з
ی	I i	И и	И и
ی	J j	Й й	Й й
ك, ک	K k	К к	К к
ق	Q q	Қ қ	Къ къ
ل	L l	Л л	Л л
م	M m	М м	М м
ن	N n	Н н	Н н
ڭ, ݣ	Ꞑ ꞑ	Ң ң	Нг нг (Нъ нъ)
وٓ	O o	О о	О о
پ	P p	П п	П п
ر	R r	Р р	Р р
س	S s	С с	С с
ت	T t	Т т	Т т
و	U u	У у	У у
و	W w	Ў ў	У у (Ў ў, У́ у́)
ف	F f	Ф ф	Ф ф
خ	X x	Х х	Х х
ح	H h	Һ һ	-
—	S̷ s̷	Ц ц	Ц ц
چ	C c	Ч ч	Ч ч
ش	Ş ş	Ш ш	Ш ш
—	—	Щ щ	Щ щ
—	—	ъ	ъ
ىٕ	Ь ь	Ы ы	Ы ы
—	—	ь	ь
ئە (اە)	E e	Э э	Э э
ۉ	Y y	Ү ү, Ю ю	Ю ю
-	-	Я я	Я я

== Grammar ==
=== Nominals ===
==== Cases ====
Case	Suffix
Nominative	-ø
Accusative	-НИ
Genitive	-НИ
Dative	-ГА
Locative	-ДА
Ablative	-дан

==== Possessive suffixes ====
	Singular	Plural
1st person	-им	-ибиз
2nd person	-инг	-игиз
3rd person	-(s)I(n)	-(s)I(n)

== Vocabulary ==
=== Numerals ===
Numeral	Karachay–Balkar	Kumyk	Nogay
0	ноль	ноль	ноль
1	бир	бир	бир
2	эки	эки	эки
3	юч	уьч	уьш
4	тёрт	дёрт	доьрт
5	беш	беш	бес
6	алты	алты	алты
7	джети	етти	йети
8	сегиз	сегиз	сегиз
9	тогъуз	тогъуз	тогыз
10	он	он	он
100	бир джюз	бир юз	бир юз

=== Loanwords ===
Loanwords from Russian, Ossetian, Kabardian, Arabic, and Persian are fairly numerous.

== In popular culture ==
Russian filmmaker Andrei Proshkin used Karachay–Balkar for The Horde, believing that it might be the closest language to the original Kipchak language which was spoken during the Golden Horde.

== Sample text ==
Article 1 of the Universal Declaration of Human Rights in Karachay–Balkar:

In Cyrillic	Transliteration	Translation
Бютеу адамла эркин болуб эмда сыйлары бла хакълары тенг болуб тууадыла. Алагъа акъыл бла намыс берилгенди эмда бир-бирлерине къарнашлыкъ халда къараргъа керекдиле.	Bütew adamla erkin bolub emda sıyları bla haqları teñ bolub tuwadıla. Alağa aqıl bla namıs berilgendi emda bir-birlerine qarnaşlıq halda qararğa kerekdile.	All human beings are born free and equal in dignity and rights. They are endowed with reason and conscience and should act towards one another in a spirit of brotherhood.
In Cyrillic (1961-1964)	Yañalif	Perso-Arabic script(Before 1926)
Бүтеу адамла эркин болуб эмда сыйлары бла хақлары тең болуб туўадыла. Алаға ақыл бла намыс берилгенди эмда бир-бирлерине қарнашлық халда қарарға керекдиле.	Byteu adamla erkin ʙoluʙ emda sьjlarь ʙla xalqlarь teꞑ ʙoluʙ tuuadьla. Alaƣa aqьl ʙla namьs ʙerilgendi emda ʙir-ʙirlerine qarnaşlьq xalda qararƣa kerekdile.	بۉتەو اداملا‌ ئەركین بوۤلوب ئەمدا سىٕیلارىٕ بلا حاقلارىٕ تەڭ بوۤلوب تووادىٕلا. الاغا عاقىٕل بلا نامىٕس بەریلگەندی ئەمدا بیر-بیرلەرینە قارناشلىٕق حالدا قارارغا كەرەكدیلە.

== Bibliography ==
- Chodiyor Doniyorov and Saodat Doniyorova. Parlons Karatchay-Balkar. Paris: Harmattan, 2005. ISBN 2-7475-9577-3.
- Steve Seegmiller (1996) Karachay (LINCOM)
