= Oghuz languages =

Sub-branch of the Turkic language family

Oghuz
- Southwestern Turkic
- Geographic distribution: Middle East, Central Asia, Southeast Europe
- Ethnicity: Oghuz Turkic people
- Linguistic classification: Turkic: Common Turkic; Oghuz
- Subdivisions: Western Oghuz; Central Oghuz; Eastern Oghuz

Language codes
- Glottolog: oghu1243 Oghuz
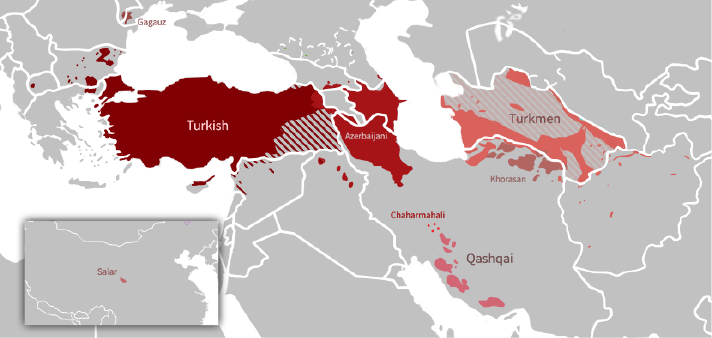
- Turkish Gagauz Azerbaijani Qashqai Chaharmahali Turkmen Khorasani Salar

The Oghuz languages are a sub-branch of the Turkic language family, spoken by approximately 108 million people. The three languages with the largest number of speakers are Turkish, Azerbaijani, and Turkmen which, combined, account for more than 95% of speakers of this sub-branch.

Kara-Khanid scholar Mahmud al-Kashgari, who lived in the 11th century, stated that the Oghuz language was the simplest among all Turkic languages.

Swedish turcologist and linguist Lars Johanson notes that Oghuz languages form a clearly discernible and closely related bloc within the Turkic language family as the cultural and political history of the speakers of Oghuz languages has linked them more closely up to the modern age. Western Oghuz languages are highly mutually intelligible with each other and the Crimean Tatar language, which, though Kipchak Turkic rather than Oghuz, has been heavily influenced by Turkish over several centuries.

== History and terminology ==
The ancestor of Oghuz languages is a matter of debate. The language of the oldest stone monuments such as Orkhon inscriptions, and documents such as Old Uyghur manuscripts are rather the ancestor of Central Asiatic Turkic languages (including Karluk and Kipchak). Oghuz languages apparently originate from the language of the people known as "Western Türküt" in Chinese annals. Old Anatolian and Old Ottoman languages, known as Middle Turkic, would be the most ancient within the Oghuz group of Turkic languages.

The term "Oghuz" is applied to the southwestern branch of the Common Turkic languages. It is in reference to the Oghuz Turks, who migrated from the Altay Mountains to Central Asia in the 8th century and further expanded to the Middle East and to the Balkans as separate tribes.

== Classification ==
The Oghuz languages currently spoken have been classified into three categories based on their features and geography: Western, Eastern, and Central.

Glottolog proposes the following linguistic classification and subgrouping of the Oghuz languages.

Turkic	Common Turkic	Oghuz			
Turkic	Common Turkic	Oghuz	Salar	Salar	
Turkic	Common Turkic	Oghuz	Nuclear Oghuz	Qashqa'i	Qashqa'i
Turkic	Common Turkic	Oghuz	Nuclear Oghuz	Central Oghuz	North Azerbaijani; South Azerbaijani
Turkic	Common Turkic	Oghuz	Nuclear Oghuz	East Oghuz	Khorasan Turkic; Turkmen
Turkic	Common Turkic	Oghuz	Nuclear Oghuz	West Oghuz	Turkish; Gagauz; Rumelian Turkish

Proto-Turkic	Common Turkic	Oghuz		
Proto-Turkic	Common Turkic	Oghuz	Western	Turkish; Azerbaijani; Gagauz; Balkan Turkish; Karapapakh †; Ottoman Turkish †; Old Anatolian Turkish †; Pecheneg? †; Ajem-Turkic †; Crimean Ottoman †
Proto-Turkic	Common Turkic	Oghuz	Eastern	Turkmen; Khorasani Turkic; Salar
Proto-Turkic	Common Turkic	Oghuz	Central	Qashqai; Chaharmahali Turkic; Afshari Turkic; Sonqori Turkic

Two further languages, Crimean Tatar and Urum, are Kipchak languages, but have been heavily influenced by the Oghuz languages. The extinct Crimean Ottoman language, commonly referred to as the "southern dialect" of Crimean Tatar, was an Oghuz language.

The extinct Pecheneg language was probably Oghuz, but as it is poorly documented, it is difficult to further classify it within the Oghuz family; it is therefore usually excluded from classification.

== Features ==
The Oghuz languages share a number of features that have led linguists to classify them together. Some of the features are shared with other Turkic languages, and others are unique to the Oghuz family.

Swedish turcologist and linguist Lars Johanson notes that Oghuz languages form a clearly discernible and closely related bloc within the Turkic language family as the cultural and political history of Oghuz Turks has linked them more closely up to the modern age when compared to other Turkic subgroups.

=== Shared features ===
- Loss of initial *h sound (shared with all Turkic languages but Khalaj)
- Loss of productivity of the original Turkic instrumental case -n (shared with all Turkic languages but Yakut and Khalaj)

=== Unique features ===
- Voicing of stops (e.g. Anatolian Turkish gök < Ottoman گوك gök < Proto-Turkic kȫk, "sky"; Anatolian dağ < Ottoman طاغ dağ < Proto-Turkic tāg "mountain")
- Loss of q/ɣ after ɯ/u (e.g. quru < quruq, "dry", sarɯ < sarɯɣ, "yellow")
- Change in form of participial from -gan to -an

== Comparison ==
The remarkable similarity between Oghuz languages may be demonstrated through a sentence, which employs a verbal noun in the dative as a link between the main verb and auxiliary. This feature is universally shared by all Oghuz languages. Turcologist Julian Rentzsch uses this particular sentence in his work titled "Uniformity and diversity in Turkic inceptive constructions":

English: ‘The dead man rose, sat down and began to speak.’

- Turkish: Ölü doğrulup oturdu ve konuşmaya başladı.
- Turkmen: Öli ýerinden galyp oturdy-da, geplemäge başlady.
- Azerbaijani: Ölü durub oturdu və danışmağa başladı.
- Khorezmian: Öli turıp otırdı dan, gəpləməyə başladı.
- Gagauz: Ölü oturdu da bašladï lafetmää.

== See also ==
- Oghuz Turks
- Turkic languages
- Turkic peoples
- Turkomans
