= Kipchak languages =

Sub-branch of the Turkic language family

Kipchak
- Northwestern Turkic
- Geographic distribution: Central Asia, Russia, Northern Caucasus, Balkans, Lithuania, Romania, Ukraine, China
- Ethnicity: Kipchaks
- Linguistic classification: Turkic: Common Turkic; Kipchak
- Subdivisions: Kipchak–Cuman; Kipchak–Bulgar; Kipchak–Nogai; Kipchak–Kyrgyz

Language codes
- Glottolog: kipc1239
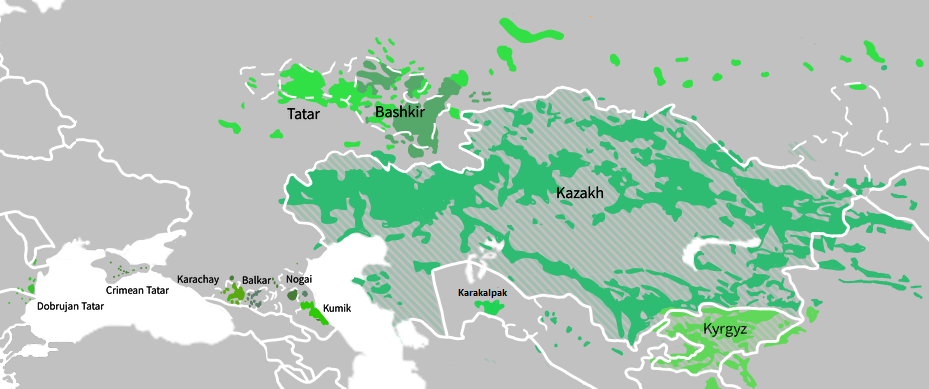

The Kipchak languages (also known as the Kypchak, Qypchaq, Qypshaq or the Northwestern Turkic languages) are a sub-branch of the Turkic language family spoken by approximately 30 million people in much of Central Asia and Eastern Europe, spanning from Bulgaria and Romania in Southeastern Europe to China in East Asia. Some of the most widely spoken languages in this group are Kazakh, Kyrgyz, and Tatar.

== Linguistic features ==
The Kipchak languages share a number of features that have led linguists to classify them together. Some of these features are shared with other Common Turkic languages; others are unique to the Kipchak family.

=== Shared features ===
- Change of Proto-Turkic *d to /j/ (e.g. *hadaq > ajaq "foot")
- Loss of initial *h, see above example

=== Unique features ===
==== Family-specific ====
- Frequent fortition (in the form of assibilation) of initial */j/ (e.g. *jetti > ʒetti "seven")
- Diphthongs from syllable-final */ɡ/ and */b/ (e.g. *taɡ > taw "mountain", *sub > suw "water")

==== Language-specific ====
- In both Tatar and Bashkir, the original mid and high vowels are swapped in position by vowel raising and lowering:

Old Turkic		Tatar (for example)	
Mid → high
*e	/e/	i	/i/
*o	/o/	u	/u/
*ö	/ø/	ü	/y/
High → Mid
*i	/i/	e	/ɪ/
*ı	/ɯ/	î	/ɤ/
*u	/u/	o	/ʊ/
*ü	/y/	ö	/ø/

== Classification ==
The Kipchak languages may be broken down into four groups based on geography and shared features (languages in bold are still spoken today):

Proto-Turkic	Common Turkic	Kipchak	**Kipchak–Bulgar** (Uralian, Uralo-Caspian)	**Bashkir**; **Tatar**; † Old Tatar (Volga-Ural Turki, literary language)
Proto-Turkic	Common Turkic	Kipchak	**Kipchak–Cuman** (Ponto-Caspian)	**Mountain dialect of Crimean Tatar**; **Tatar** (Mishar Dialects); **Karachay-Balkar** (Mountain Turkic); **Kumyk**; **Karaim**; **Krymchak**; **Urum**; † Cuman; † Mamluk-Kipchak; † Armeno-Kipchak
Proto-Turkic	Common Turkic	Kipchak	**Kipchak–Nogai** (Aralo-Caspian)	**Steppe dialect of Crimean Tatar**; **Dobrujan Tatar**; **Kazakh**; **Karakalpak**; **Nogai**; **Western Siberian Tatar**; **Tobol-Irtysh Tatar**; **Uzbek Kipchak** (ru: Кыпчакские диалекты узбекского языка)
Proto-Turkic	Common Turkic	Kipchak	**Kipchak–Kyrgyz** (Kyrgyz)	**Southern Altai**; **Teleut**; **Telengit**; **Kyrgyz**; **Eastern Siberian Tatar**; **Baraba Tatar**; **Tom Tatar**; † Fergana Kipchak

== See also ==
- Kipchaks
- Kipchaks in Georgia
- Cuman people
- Cuman language
- Cumania
- Kalpak

== Bibliography ==
- Johanson, Lars; Csató, Éva Ágnes (1998). The Turkic Languages. London: Routledge. ISBN 0-415-08200-5.
- Menges, Karl H. (1995). The Turkic Languages and Peoples (2nd ed.). Wiesbaden: Harrassowitz. ISBN 3-447-03533-1.
