= Common Turkic languages =

Classification of the Turkic language family

Common Turkic
- Shaz Turkic
- Geographic distribution: Southern Europe, Eastern Europe, Western Asia, Central Asia, North Asia, East Asia
- Linguistic classification: Turkic: Common Turkic
- Subdivisions: Oghuz; Kipchak; Karluk; Siberian Turkic; Arghu

Language codes
- Glottolog: comm1245
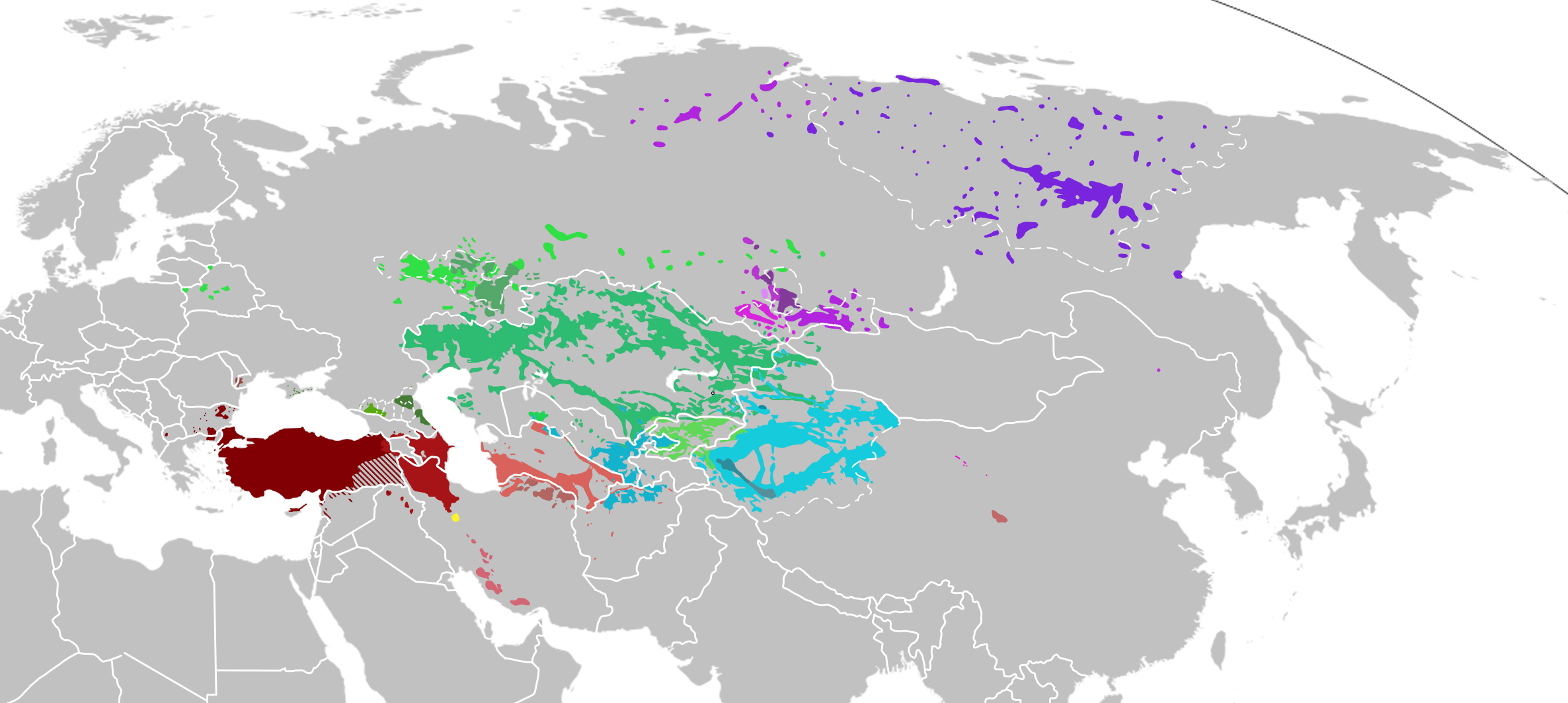
- Map of the distribution of Common Turkic Languages across Eurasia

Common Turkic or Shaz Turkic is a proposed genetic unit in some classifications of the Turkic languages, a sub-branch that includes all of them except the Oghuric languages, which had diverged earlier.

== Classification ==
Lars Johanson's proposal contains the following subgroups:

- Southwestern Common Turkic (Oghuz)
- Northwestern Common Turkic (Kipchak)
- Southeastern Common Turkic (Karluk)
- Northeastern Common Turkic (Siberian)
- Arghu (Khalaj)

In that classification scheme, Common Turkic is opposed to the Oghuric languages (Lir-Turkic). The Common Turkic languages are characterized by sound correspondences such as Common Turkic š versus Oghuric l and Common Turkic z versus Oghuric r.

Siberian Turkic is split into a "Central Siberian Turkic" and "North Siberian Turkic" branch within the classification presented in Glottolog v4.8.

In other classification schemes (such as those of Alexander Samoylovich and Nikolay Baskakov), the internal classification is different.

== Literature ==
- Johanson, Lars & Éva Agnes Csató (ed.). 1998. The Turkic languages. London: Routledge. ISBN 0-415-08200-5.
