= Middle Turkic languages =

900s–1500s phase of the Turkic languages

Middle Turkic
- Region: Central Asia
- Era: c. 900–1500 CE
- Language family: Turkic: Common Turkic; Middle Turkic

Language codes
- ISO 639-3: xqa Karakhanid
- Glottolog: None

Middle Turkic is a phase in the development of the Turkic language family, covering much of the Middle Ages (c. 900–1500 CE). In particular the term is used by linguists to refer to a group of Karluk, Oghuz and Kipchak and related languages spoken during this period in Central Asia, Iran, and other parts of the Middle East controlled by the Seljuk Turks. Middle Turkish is also a dialect of Common Turkic.

== Classification ==
Middle Turkic can be divided into eastern and western branches.

Eastern Middle Turkic consists of Karakhanid (also called Khaqani Turkic), a literary language which was spoken in Kashgar, Balasaghun and other cities along the Silk Road and its later descendants such as Khorezmian Turkic and Chagatai.

The western branch consists of Kipchak languages documented in Codex Cumanicus and various Mamluk Kipchak texts from Egypt and Syria, and Oghuz Turkic represented by Old Anatolian Turkish. Old Anatolian Turkish was noted to be initially influenced by Eastern Middle Turkic traditions.

Karluk and Oghuz "Middle Turkic" period overlaps with the East Old Turkic period, which covers the 8th to 13th centuries, thus sometimes Karakhanid language is categorized under the "Old Turkic" period.

== Literary works ==
- Book of Wisdom (ديوان حكمت) (Dīvān-i Ḥikmet) by Khoja Akhmet Yassawi. (in Karakhanid)
- Mahmud al-Kashgari's Divânü Lügati't-Türk (in Karakhanid and Arabic)
- Yusuf Balasaghuni's Kutadgu Bilig (in Karakhanid)
- Ahmad bin Mahmud Yukenaki (Ahmed bin Mahmud Yükneki) (Ahmet ibn Mahmut Yükneki) (Yazan Edib Ahmed b. Mahmud Yükneki) (w:tr:Edip Ahmet Yükneki) wrote the Hibet-ül hakayik (Hibet ül-hakayık) (Hibbetü'l-Hakaik) (Atebetüʼl-hakayik) (Hibat al-ḥaqāyiq) (هبة الحقايق) (w:tr:Atabetü'l-Hakayık)
- The works of Ali-Shir Nava'i (in Chagatai), including (titles in Arabic)
  - Gharā’ib al-Ṣighār ("Wonders of Childhood")
  - Nawādir al-Shabāb ("Witticisms of Youth")
  - Badā’i‘ al-Wasaṭ ("Marvels of Middle Age")
  - Fawā’id al-Kibār ("Advantages of Old Age")
  - Muḥākamat al-Lughatayn ("Judgment between the Two Languages")
- The Mughal Emperor Babur's Baburnama (in Chagatai)
- The ‘Pagan’ Oɣuz-namä — date and place of composition is unknown.

== See also ==
- Karluk languages
- Proto-Turkic
- Turkic literature
