= Southern Uzbek language =

Uzbek dialect spoken in Afghanistan and Pakistan

Southern Uzbek
- اوزبیک تیلی، اوزبیکچه، اوزبیک تورکچه‌سی، اوزبیکی özbek tili, özbekça, özbek turkçasi, özbekiy
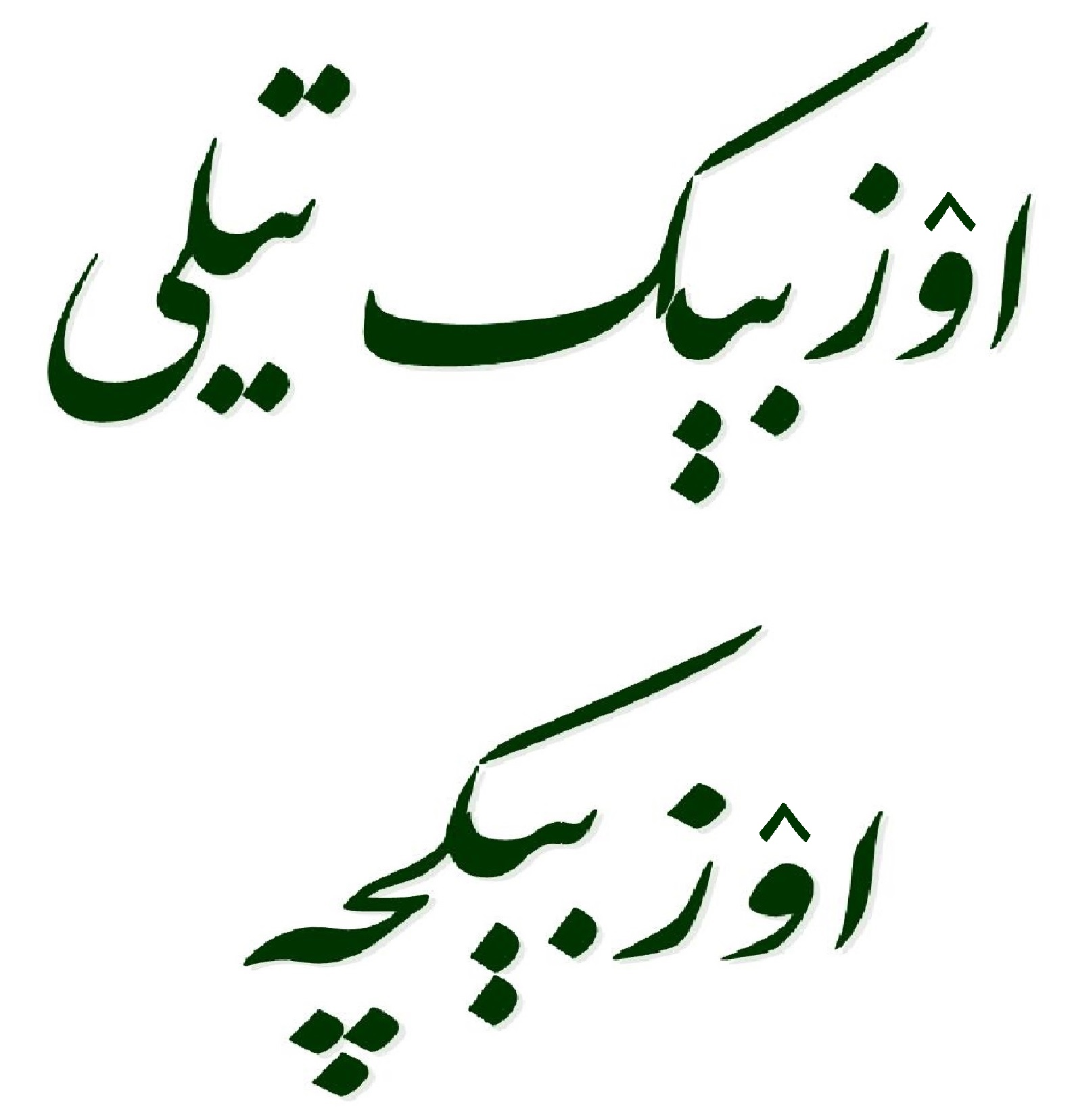
- Native to: Afghanistan; Pakistan
- Ethnicity: Uzbeks (Uzbeks in Afghanistan and Uzbeks in Pakistan)
- Native speakers: 4.6 million (2023)
- Language family: Turkic: Common Turkic; Karluk; Uzbek; Southern Uzbek
- Early forms: Middle Turkic: Khorezmian Turkic; Chagatai
- Writing system: Perso-Arabic

Official status
- Recognised minority language in: China; Afghanistan (3rd most spoken language)
- Regulated by: Afghan Ministry of Education

Language codes
- ISO 639-3: uzs
- Glottolog: sout2699
- Linguasphere: 44-AAB-da,

Southern Uzbek, also known as Afghan Uzbek, is the southern variant of the Uzbek language, spoken chiefly in Afghanistan and Pakistan with up to 4.6 million native speakers. It uses the Perso-Arabic writing system in contrast to the Uzbek spoken in Uzbekistan and other former Soviet countries in Central Asia. It is written in the Nastaliq hand of calligraphy.

Southern Uzbek is intelligible with the Northern Uzbek spoken in Uzbekistan to a certain degree. However, it has differences in grammar and also many more loan words from Dari, the local New Persian variety, in which many Southern Uzbek speakers are proficient; on the other hand, Northern Uzbeks have absorbed loanwords from Russian (in which many Northern Uzbeks are proficient) since their integration to the Russian Empire and then the Soviet Union.

== Southern Uzbek Alphabet ==
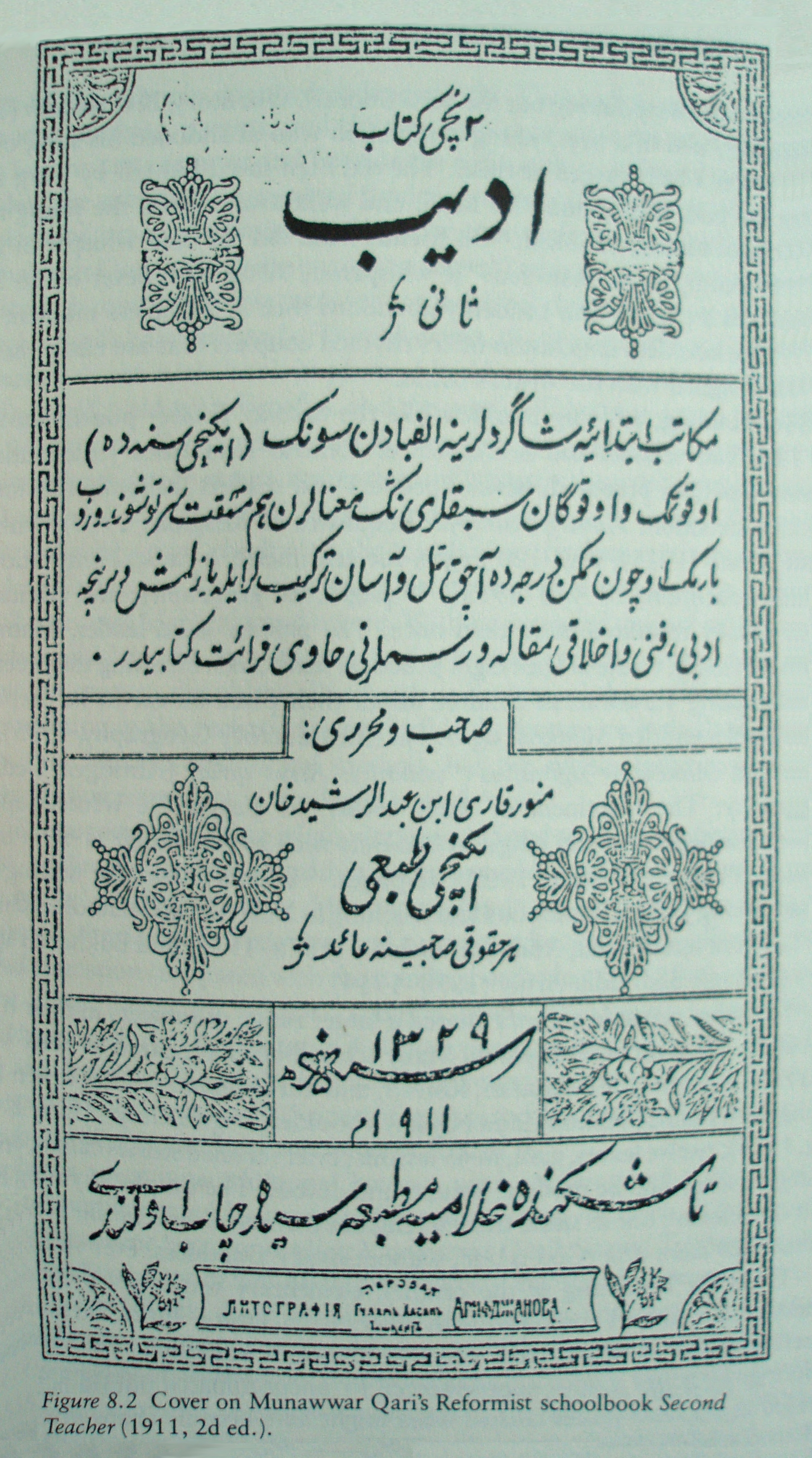
A 1911 text in Southern Uzbek

Southern Uzbek is written using the Arabic writing system called Arab Yozuv عرب یازوو ("Arab Script"). The writing system is for the most part identical to Perso-Arabic alphabet, with three additional letters. These include two vowels, "اۉ / ۉ" and "اې / ې" (optional in writing, and substitutable in practice by "او / و" and "ای / ی" respectively), which are meant to represent the sounds represented in Uzbek Latin Script with "E e" and "Ö ö". The alphabet also includes a combined consonant letter "نگ", formerly (and currently in writing systems such as Uyghur) shown with the letter "ڭ". This letter represents the sound /ŋ/, and represented in the Latin writing system with "-ng". This letter makes the Voiced velar nasal sound, where in English one can for example hear when pronouncing the word "king (کینگ) sing (سینگ) thing (ثینگ)".

Uzbek has six vowels, and it has lost its vowel harmony rules, unlike other Turkic languages.

Table of Vowels in Uzbek Arabic Alphabet (with alif at the beginning of words)
Arabic			Latin	IPA	Notes
Final	Medial	Initial	Latin	IPA	Notes
ـَه	ـَ	اَ	A a	/a/	
ـا		آ	‌ O o	/ɔ/	
ـِی	ـِیـ	اِیـ	I i	/i/	
ـې	ـېـ	اېـ	E e	/e/	In unvocalized spelling, it may be substituted by ی. Final -e is limited to Persian loanwords.
ـِه	N/A	N/A	E e	/e/	Final -e is limited to Persian loanwords. For loanwords from other languages than Persian and Arabic, ـِه is preferred to transliterate -e.
N/A	ـِ	اِ	I i E e	/i, e/	
ـُو		اُو	‌ U u	/u/	
ـۉ		اۉ	Ö ö	/o/	In unvocalized spelling, it may be substituted by و.
N/A	ـُ	اُ	U u Ö ö	/u, o/	Only used in Persian and Arabic loanwords.

Other than the additional combined letter "نگ / -ng", the consonants of Uzbek Arabic Alphabet are identical to that of Persian. Thus, there indeed is a case of various letters representing the same sound, as is the case in Persian. But the letters "ث، ح، ذ، ژ، ص، ض، ط، ظ، ع" are not used for writing of native Uzbek words. They are solely used for writing of loanwords from Arabic, Persian, or any of the European languages.

Letter				Latin	IPA
Final	Medial	Initial	Isolated	Latin	IPA
ـب	ـبـ	بـ	ب	B b	/b/
ـپ	ـپـ	پـ	پ	P p	/p/
ـت	ـتـ	تـ	ت	T t	/t/
ـث	ـثـ	ثـ	ث	S s	/s/
ـج	ـجـ	جـ	ج	J j	/dʒ/
ـچ	ـچـ	چـ	چ	Ç ç	/tʃ/
ـح	ـحـ	حـ	ح	H h	/h/
ـخ	ـخـ	خـ	خ	X x	/x~χ/
ـد		د		D d	/d/
ـذ		ذ		Z z	/z/
ـر		ر		R r	/r/
ـز		ز		Z z	/z/
ـژ		ژ		J j	/ʒ/
ـس	ـسـ	سـ	س	S s	/s/
ـش	ـشـ	شـ	ش	Ş ş	/ʃ/
ـص	ـصـ	صـ	ص	S s	/s/
ـض	ـضـ	ضـ	ض	Z z	/z/
ـط	ـطـ	طـ	ط	T t	/t/
ـظ	ـظـ	ظـ	ظ	Z z	/z/
ـع	ـعـ	عـ	ع	ʼ	/ʔ/
ـغ	ـغـ	غـ	غ	Ğ ğ	/ɣ~ʁ/
ـف	ـفـ	فـ	ف	F f	/f/
ـق	ـقـ	قـ	ق	Q q	/q/
ـک	ـکـ	کـ	ک	K k	/k/
ـگ	ـگـ	گـ	گ	G g	/ɡ/
ـل	ـلـ	لـ	ل	L l	/l/
ـم	ـمـ	مـ	م	M m	/m/
ـن	ـنـ	نـ	ن	N n	/n/
ـنگ	ـنگـ	نگـ	نگ	-ng	/ŋ/
ـو		و		V v	/v~w/
ـه	ـهـ	هـ	ه	H h	/h/
ـی	ـیـ	یـ	ی	‌ Y y	/j/
-	ـئـ / ـأ / ـؤ	ئـ / أ / ؤ	ء	ʼ	/ʔ/

== See also ==
- Chagatai language
- Uzbek literature
