= Mahmud ibn 'Ali al-Sarai =

Islamic scholar

Maḥmūd ibn ʿAlī al-Sarāī was a fourteenth-century CE scholar, known from one of the main surviving works composed in Khwārazm Turkish, namely نهج الفراديس (Nahjatü l-Farādīs).

== Nahjatü l-Farādīs ==
Nahjatü l-Farādīs is known in Turkish today as Nehcü’l-Ferâdîs or Nehcü'l-Feradis, and has also been known as Fezâilü’l-Mu‘cizât. It appears to have been composed in 1358 and is similar in both language and content to the more widely attested Qiṣaṣ-i Rabghūzī by Nāṣir al-Dīn Rabghūzī. The text contains four sections, each divided into ten chapters. The first section describes the life of Muḥammad; the second gives information about founding figures of Islam, including four caliphs and Fāṭima; the thirds discusses good deeds; and the fourth discusses bad deeds. As of 2006, over ten manuscripts were known.

== Editions of the Nahjatü l-Farādīs ==
- Nehcü’l-Ferdis (Tıpkıbasım), ed. by János Eckmann (Ankara 1956). Facsimile of a manuscript of the text. The introduction promises further volumes, but none appeared.
