= Yūsuf Balasaguni =

11th-century Central Asian Turkic poet, statesman, vizier and philosopher

Yusuf Balasaguni: Khass Khajib; Tayangu
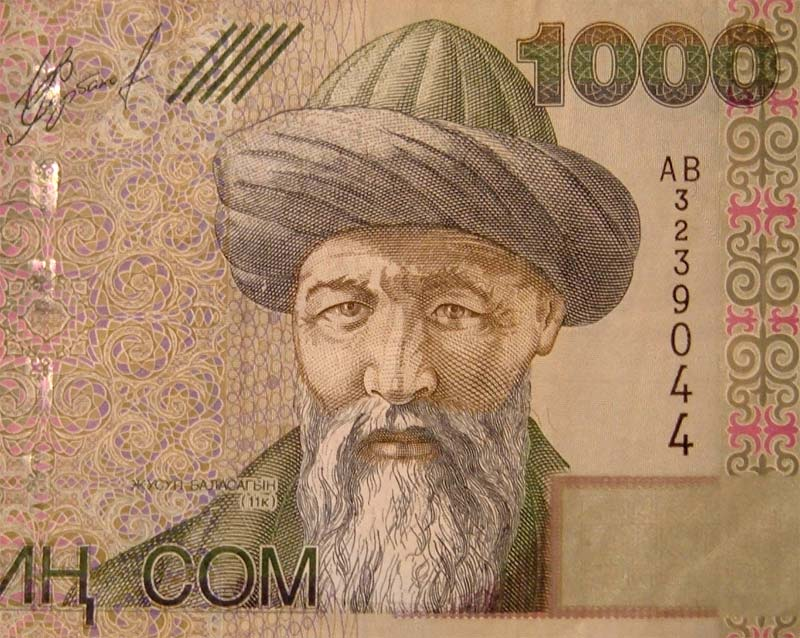
- As shown on the Kyrgyz 1000 som note
- Born: Yusuf c. 1019; Balasagun, Kara-Khanid Khanate
- Died: 1077 (aged 57–58); Kashgar, Kara-Khanid Khanate
- Occupations: Philosopher, Theologian, Vizier, Statesman
- Notable work: Kutadgu Bilig

Yusuf Khass Hajib (Note: Persian: یوسف خاصّ حاجب, romanized: Yūsuf Khāṣṣ Ḥājib; Kazakh: Жүсіп Баласағұни, romanized: Jüsip Balasağunï; Uyghur: يۈسۈپ خاس ھاجىپ; Kyrgyz: Жусуп Баласагын, romanized: Jusup Balasagın; Uzbek: Yusuf Xos Hojib) was an 11th-century Central Asian Turkic poet, statesman, vizier, Maturidi theologian and philosopher from the city of Balasaghun, the capital of the Kara-Khanid Khanate in modern-day Kyrgyzstan. He wrote the Kutadgu Bilig and most of what is known about him, comes from his own writings in this work. He is mostly referred to as Yūsuf Balasaguni, derived from his city of origin.

== Background ==
Balasaguni's birthplace Balasagun was located at the Burana archaeological site near the present-day city of Tokmok in Northern Kyrgyzstan. His birthdate is estimated to be 1018 or 1019. His father was one of the prominent and wealthy people of that time. The young poet received his primary education in his hometown.

At the age of 54 (either in 1069 or 1070), Yusuf completed his work, Kutadgu Bilig ("Blessed Knowledge"). He wrote, as he called it himself, in the Turkic language of the Karakhanid era.

Kutadgu Bilig was the first work written in the language of the Muslim Turks during the Muslim Renaissance, as evidenced by the words of the poet at the beginning of the poem:

Middle Turkic:

arabça tejikçe kitâblar üküş,
biziñ tilimizçe bu yumğı ukuş.
biliglig bilür ol munıñ hürmeti,
ukuşluğ ukar ol bilig kıymeti...

Translation:

Yes, the Arabs, Tajiks have a lot of books,
As for our speech, this is only the beginning.
Who is wise will appreciate this book with respect,
Who has matured with reason, appreciates knowledge...

Many Turkic-speaking peoples can rightfully consider this work as the source or the first masterpiece of their written literature of the Muslim era.

Some authors believe that Yusuf allegedly died at the age of 55 and was buried in the southern part of the city of Kashgar. However, there are no direct historical sources about the date and place of death of Balasaguni.

== Kutadgu Bilig ==
Balasaguni started to work on the Kutadgu Bilig (Middle Turkic: Wisdom of Royal Glory) in Balasagun and was about 50 years old when he completed it in Kashgar. After presenting the completed work to the Karakhanid Hasan ibn Sulayman (father of Ali-Tegin) - Prince of Kashgar he was awarded the title Khāṣṣ Ḥājib, an honorific similar to "Privy Chamberlain" or "Chancellor". Some scholars suspect that the prologue to the Kutadgu Bilig, which is much more overtly Islamic than the rest of the text, was not written by Yūsuf, particularly the first prologue, which is in prose, unlike the rest of the text. He died and was buried in Kashgar, 1077.

The following is the excerpt from the Kutadgu Bilig; the first column is the text in the original (Karluk or Middle Turkic) language, but transliterated into Turkish (Latin) letters. Second column is the text's Turkish translation, while the third one is its English translation.

Text in original Turkic language:
Bayat atı birle sözüg başladım, törütgen egidgen keçürgen idim
Üküş ögdi birle tümen miŋ senâ, uğan bir bayatka aŋar yok fenâ
Yağız yer yaşıl kök kün ay birle tün, törütti halâyık öd üdlek bu kün
Tiledi törütti bu bolmış kamuğ, bir ök bol tedi boldı kolmış kamuğ
Kamuğ barça muŋluğ törütülmişi, muŋı yok idi bir aŋar yok eşi
Ay erklig uğan meŋü muŋsuz bayat, yaramaz seniŋdin adınka bu at
Uluğluk saŋa ol bedüklük saŋa, seniŋdin adın yok saŋa tuş teŋe
Aya ber birikmez saŋa bir adın, kamuğ aşnuda sen sen öŋdün kedin

Turkish translation:
Yaratan, yetiştiren ve göçüren rabbim olan Tanrının adı ile söze başladım.
Kadir ve bir olan Tanrıya çok hamd ve binlerce sena olsun; Onun için fânilik yoktur.
Kara yer ile mâvî göğü, güneş ile ayı, gece ile gündüzü, zaman ile zamaneyi ve mahlûkları O yarattı.
İstedi ve bütün bu varlıkları yarattı; bir kere :— "ol!"—dedi, bütün diledikleri oldu.
Bütün bu yaratılmış olanlar Ona muhtacdır; muhtaç olmayan yalnız Tanrıdır; Onun eşi yoktur.
Ey kuvvetli, kadir, ebedî ve müstağni olan Tanrı, Senden başkasına bu ad yakışmaz.
Ululuk ve büyüklük Sana mahsustur; Sana eş ve denk olan başka biri yoktur.
Ey bir olan Tanrı, bir başkası Sana şerik koşulamaz; başta her şeyden evvel ve sonda her şeyden sonra Sensin.

English translation:
I started with the name of God, my Lord, who created, cultivated and moved.
Praise be to God, who is Powerful, as well as one and only; there is no fraud for Him.
He created the dark earth and the blue sky, the sun and the moon, the night and the day, the time and all creatures.
He wanted and created all these beings; Once: - "Be!" - He said, everything He wanted came into being.
All these creatures need Him; the only one who does not need anything is God; He has no equal.
God, You are mighty, powerful, eternal and our master; this name does not suit anyone else than You.
Greatness belongs to you; There is no one who can match you or be equal with you.
Oh, the only God, no one can reach You; You are at the beginning of everything and also at the end.

== Memory ==
- A monument in Bishkek, Kyrgyzstan
- Kyrgyz National University was named after Yusuf Balasaguni in 2002.
- A number of streets in Kyrgyzstan bears his name.
- The image of Balasaguni is present on the banknote of the Kyrgyz national currency of 1000 soms. Also, the National Bank of Kyrgyzstan issued commemorative coins for the anniversary (1000 years since the birth) of the poet.
- Streets in Tashkent, Andijan, Samarkand in Uzbekistan bear the name Yusuf Hass Hajib.
- 2016 was declared "Yusuf Hass Hajib Year" by International Organization of Turkic Culture.

== Tomb of Yusuf Balasaguni ==
The mausoleum of the poet in Tainap, Kashgar was erected in 1865 by Yakub Beg of Yettishar but it was destroyed in 1972 during the Cultural Revolution and a school was built in its place. After the death of Mao Zedong, the mausoleum was restored to its former location, and the school was transferred to another building. When restoring the mausoleum, several more unknown burials were discovered on its territory. The grave of Yusuf Balasaguni is decorated with inscriptions in Chinese, Arabic and Uyghur.

== Gallery ==
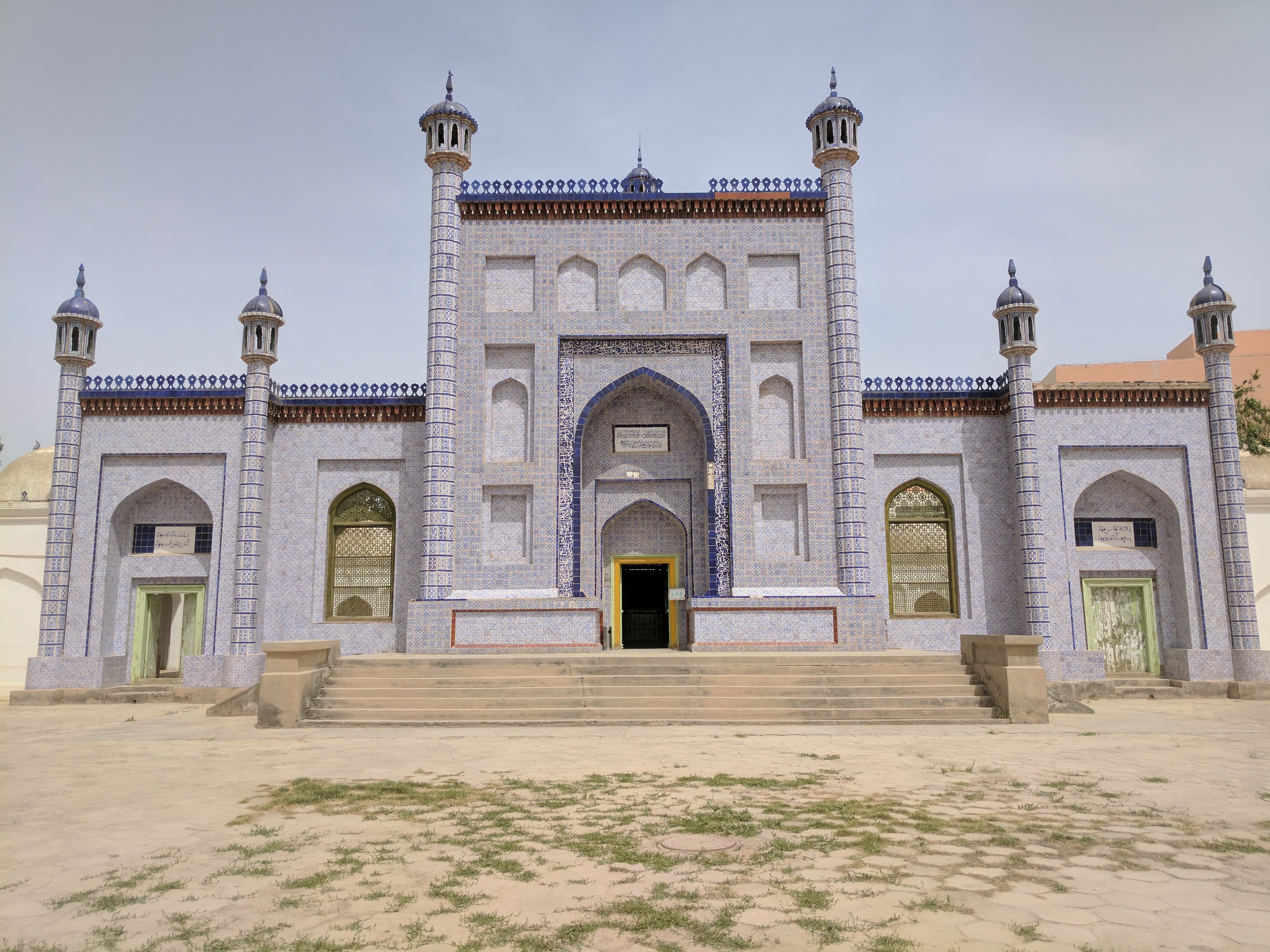
Mausoleum in Kashgar that was constructed for his alleged grave site

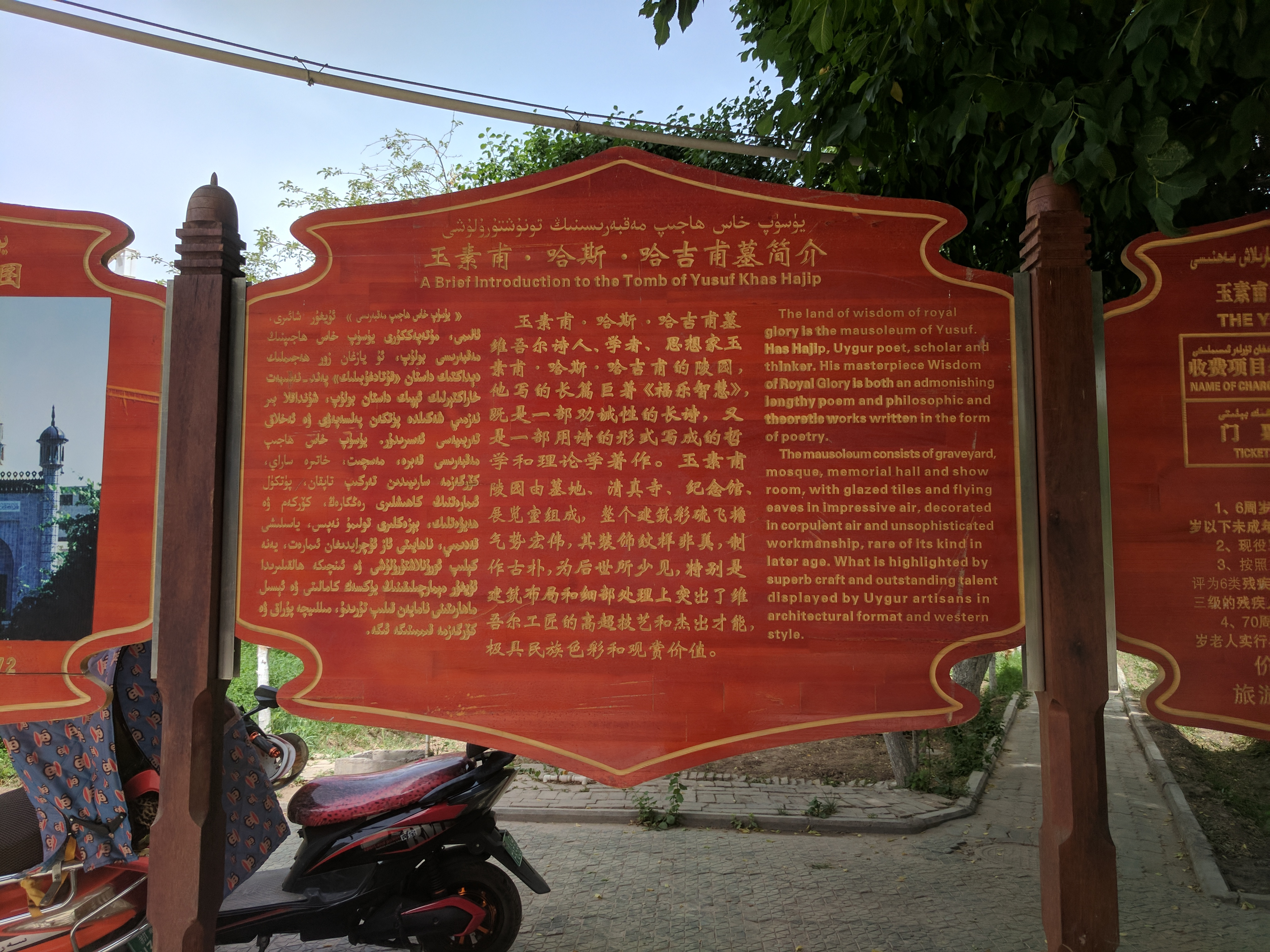
Introduction Board at Mausoleum

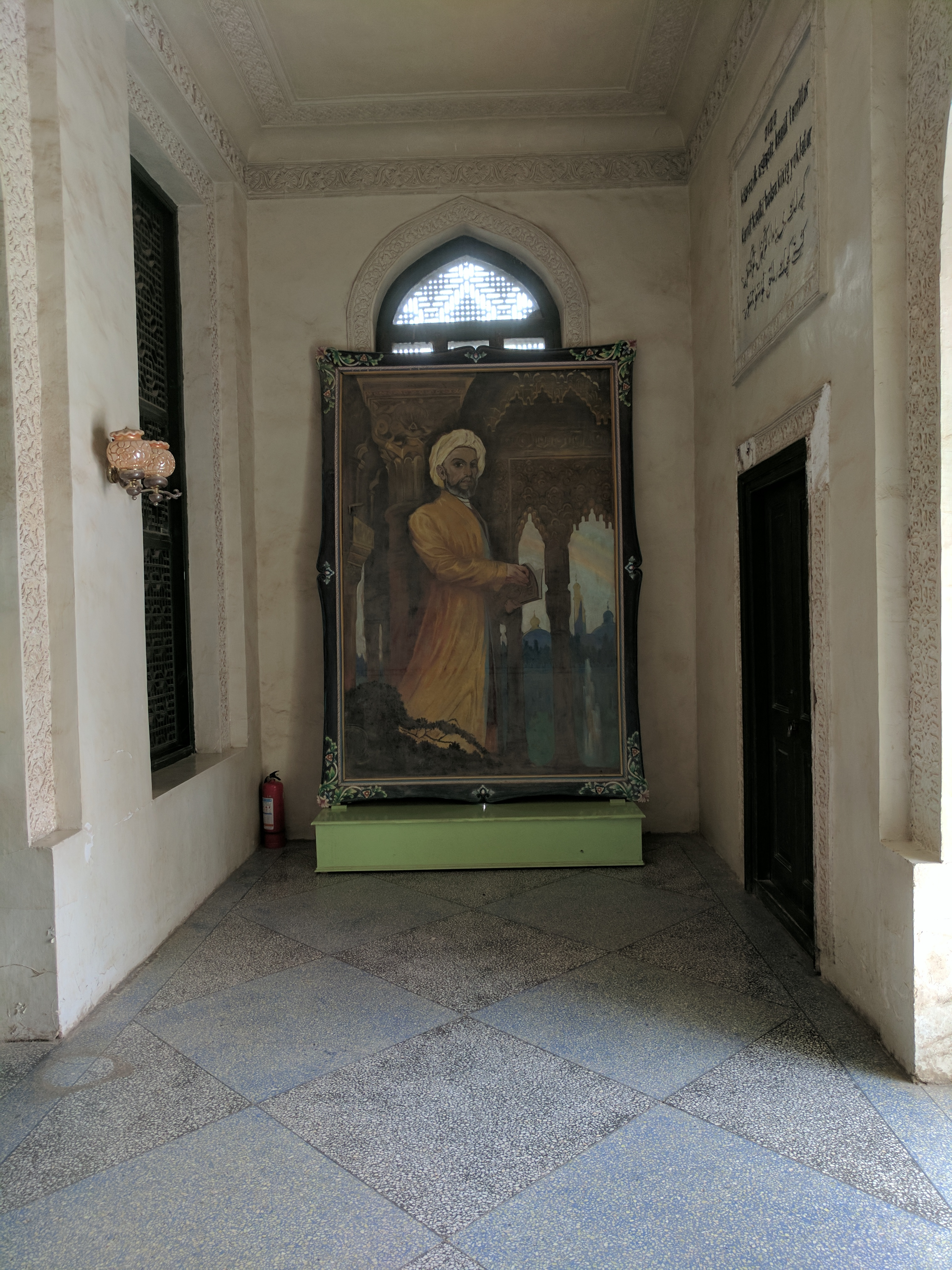
Portrait of Yusuf Khass Hajib at Mausoleum

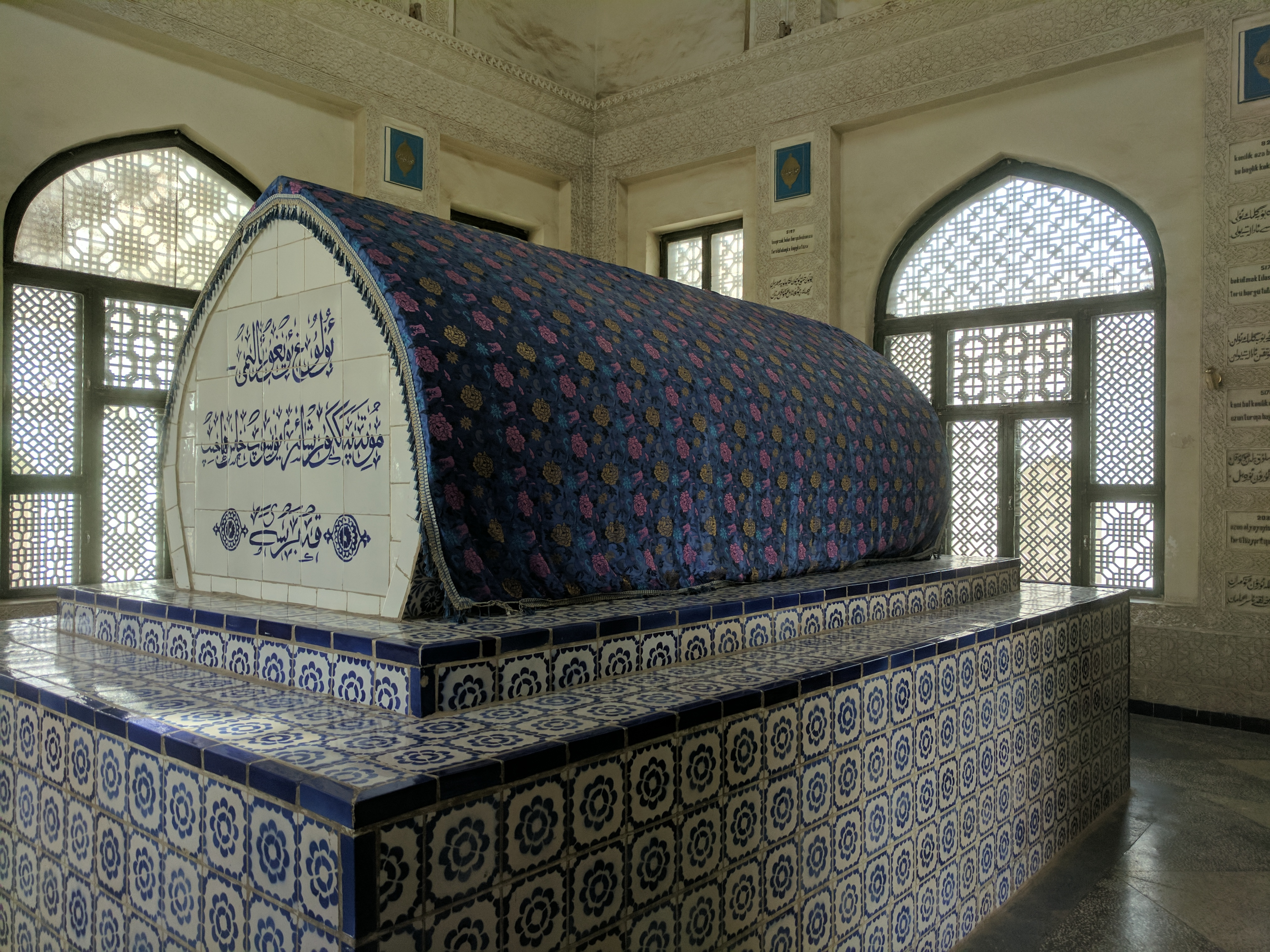
Tomb of Yusuf Khass Hajib
