= Khorezmian language =

Khorezmian may be:

- Khorezmian dialect (Uzbek) - considered either a dialect of Uzbek, or an independent Turkic language of the Oghuz group
- Khorezmian language (Turkic) - medieval, to be distinguished from the above
- Khorezmian language (Iranian)
