= Ili Turki language =

Endangered Karluk Turkic language

Ili Turki
- İlı turkeşi Илы туркеши ي̇لي تۋركەسي
- Native to: Xinjiang, China; Kazakhstan
- Ethnicity: Ili Turks
- Native speakers: 30 families (2007, China) moribund in Kazakhstan
- Language family: Turkic: Common Turkic; Karluk; Eastern Karluk; Ili Turki

Language codes
- ISO 639-3: ili
- Glottolog: ilit1241
- ELP: Ili Turki
- Ili Turki is classified as Severely Endangered by the UNESCO Atlas of the World's Languages in Danger.

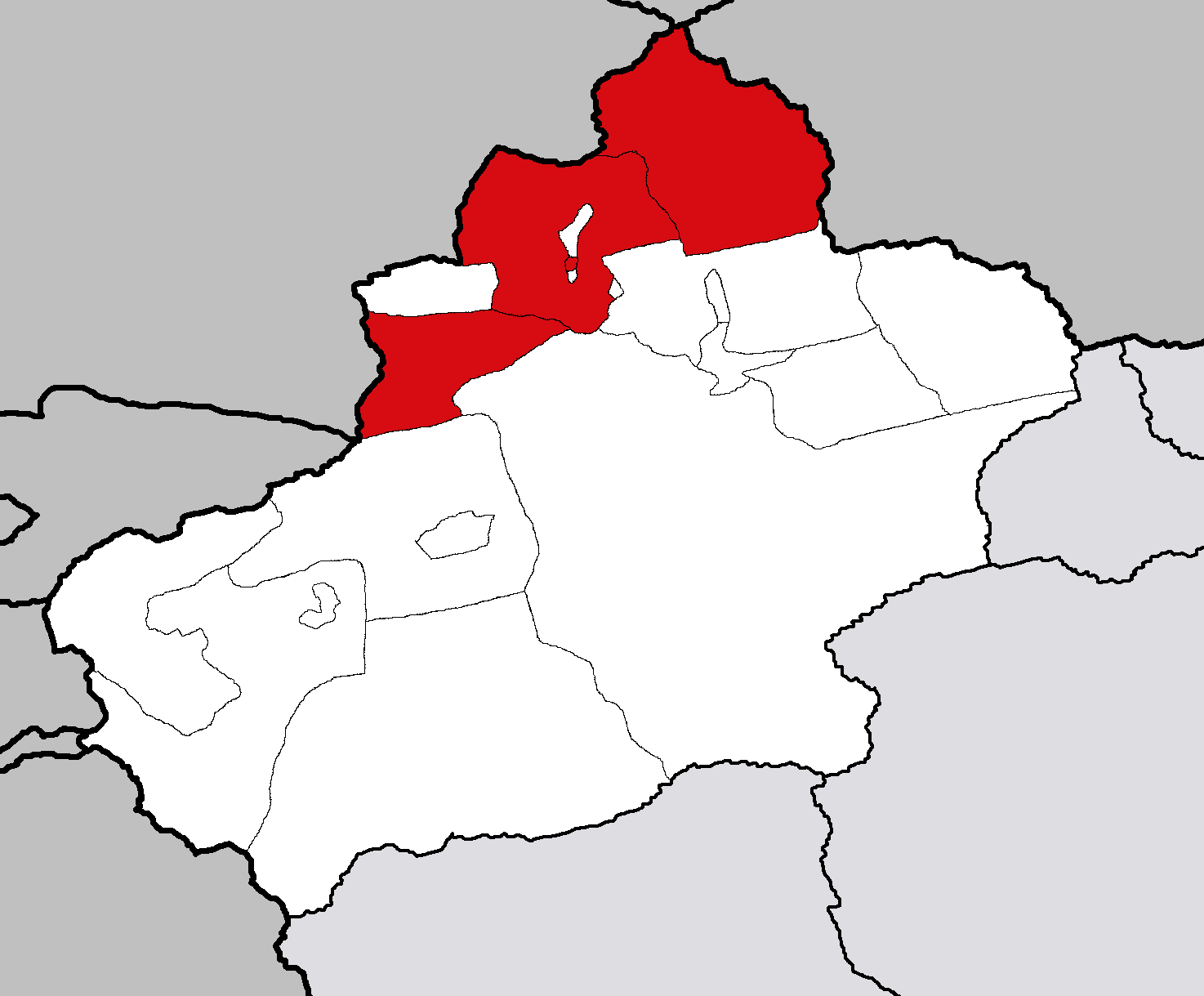
Ili Kazakh Autonomous Prefecture in China

Ili Turki is an endangered Turkic language spoken primarily in China, of the Karluk branch of Turkic. In 2007, it was reported that there were around 30 families using it in China. Speakers are shifting to Kazakh or Uyghur.

== Geographic distribution ==
Ili Turki is spoken in China's Ili Kazakh Autonomous Prefecture along the Ili River and its tributaries and in Yining. There may be some speakers in Kazakhstan. Ili Turki has no official status in either country.

== Classification ==
Ili Turki appears to belong to the Karluk group of Turkic languages, although it exhibits a number of features that suggest a Kipchak substratum.

A comparison of Ili Turki's Karluk and Kipchak features is shown below:

Kipchak & Chagatay features in Ili Turki
	Kazakh (Kipchak)	Ili Turki	Uzbek (Karluk)	English
*G > w after low vowels	taw	taw	tɒɣ	mountain
Genitive assimilation	tyje+niŋ / et+tiŋ	tʉjæ+nin / et+tin	tʉjæ+niŋ / et+niŋ	of the camel / of the meat
*G > w > Ø after high vowels	sarɨ	sarɨq	sarɨq	yellow
Loss of geminate consonants	seɡiz	sekkiz	sækkiz	eight

== Phonology ==
=== Consonants ===
Consonants of Ili Turki
		Bilabial	Alveolar	Palatal	Velar	Uvular	Glottal
Nasal		m	n		ŋ		
Plosive	voiceless	p	t	tʃ	k	q	
Plosive	voiced	b	d	dʒ	ɡ		
Fricative	voiceless		s	ʃ		χ	h
Fricative	voiced		z			ʁ	
Tap			ɾ				
Approximant			l	j	w		

=== Vowels ===
Vowels of Ili Turki
	Front	Central/Back	
	Front	unrounded	rounded
Close	i	ɨ	ʉ
Mid	e		ɵ
Open	æ	ɑ	

== Vocabulary ==
No.	Ili Turki
1	bir
2	ekki
3	üç
4	tört
5	beş
6	altı
7	yetti
8	sekkiz
9	töqqüz
10	ön

== See also ==
- Taranchi
