= Kutadgu Bilig =

11th-century work by Yūsuf Balasaguni

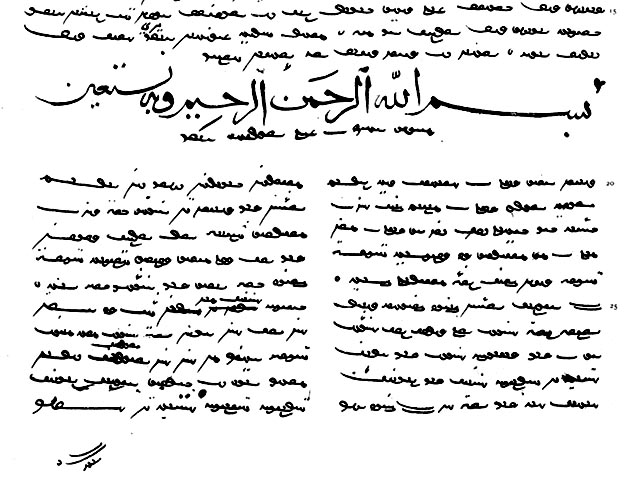
- Kutadgu Bilig written in the Old Uyghur script (15th century, on the 4th line, the basmala is written in the Arabic script)
- Author: Yusuf Khass Hajib
- Language: Khaqani Turkic
- Genre: Poetry, Mirrors for princes
- Publication date: 11th century

The Kutadgu Bilig (Note: Translated as the Wisdom which brings Happiness, the Wisdom that Conduces to Royal Glory or Fortune or more concisely the Wisdom Which Brings Good Fortune) or Qutadğu Bilig (/kuːˈtɑːdɡuː ˈbɪlɪk/; Khaqani Turkic: [qʊtɑðˈɢʊ bɪˈlɪɡ]) is an 11th-century work written by Yusuf Khass Hajib for the prince of Kashgar. The text reflects the author's and his society's beliefs, feelings and practices with regard to quite a few topics and depicts interesting facets of various aspects of life in the Kara-Khanid Khanate.

== Author ==
At several points throughout the Kutadgu Bilig, the author talks some about himself; from this we know a certain amount about him.

The author of the Kutadgu Bilig was named Yūsuf and was born in Balasagun, which at the time was the winter capital of the Karakhanid empire and was located near present-day Tokmok in Kyrgyzstan. He was about 50 years old when he completed the Kutadgu Bilig and upon presenting the completed work to the prince of Kashgar, was awarded the title Khāṣṣ Ḥājib (خاص حاجب), translating roughly as "Privy Chamberlain" or "Privy Councilor". He is often referred to as Yūsuf Khāṣṣ Ḥājib.

Some scholars suspect that the prologue to the Kutadgu Bilig, which is much more overtly Islamic than the rest of the text, was written by a different author—particularly the first prologue, which is in prose, unlike the rest of the text.

== Text ==
=== History ===
The Kutadgu Bilig was written in 1069-1070 and presented to Tavghach Bughra Khan, the prince of Kashgar. It was well known through the Timurid era (Dankoff, 3), but only three manuscripts—referred to by the name of the city they were discovered in—survived to give us our modern knowledge of the text:

- The Vienna manuscript, written in the 8th century. TURK DIL KURUMU，(I. N. Dilman)，Kutadgu Bilig Tipkibasim，Viyana Nushasi，Alaeddin Kiral Basimevi，Istanbul，1942.
- The Fergana manuscript. TURK DIL KURUMU, Kutadgu Bilig Tipkibasim, Fergana Nushasi, Istanbul, Alaeddin Kiral Basimevi, 1943.
- The Egypt manuscript. TURK DIL KURUMU, Kutadgu Bilig Tipkibasim, Misir Nushasi, Istanbul, Alaeddin Kiral Basimevi, 1943.

=== Language ===
The Kutadgu Bilig is written in a Karluk language known as the "Karakhanid language" but often simply referred to as "Middle Turkic". It's similar to the language of the Orkhon inscriptions, in Old Turkic, but in addition to the Turkic base, has a large influx of Persian vocabulary. Dankoff mentions a good number of calques in the language of the Kutadgu Bilig from Arabic and Persian.

One of the features of the language of Karakhanid is that its 3rd person imperative always has /s/ instead of /z/ and around half of the Brahmi instances are not -zUn but -sUn. This is often rendered as sU in Kutadgu Bilig:

kutadsu atı bersü iki cihân
May he be happy, may his name spread to the two worlds
——Kutadgu Bilig 88

bayat ok bolu bersü arka yölek
May Allah become your pillar
——Kutadgu Bilig 90

tuta bersü teŋri bu taht birle baht
May God bring you happiness too
——Kutadgu Bilig 92

The following is the excerpt from the Kutadgu Bilig; the first column is the text in the original (Karluk or Middle Turkic) language, but transliterated into Turkish (Latin) letters. Second column is the text's Turkish translation, while the third one is its English translation.

Text in original Turkic language:
Bayat atı birle sözüg başladım, törütgen egidgen keçürgen idim
Üküş ögdi birle tümen miŋ senâ, uğan bir bayatka aŋar yok fenâ
Yağız yer yaşıl kök kün ay birle tün, törütti halâyık öd üdlek bu kün
Tiledi törütti bu bolmış kamuğ, bir ök bol tedi boldı kolmış kamuğ
Kamuğ barça muŋluğ törütülmişi, muŋı yok idi bir aŋar yok eşi
Ay erklig uğan meŋü muŋsuz bayat, yaramaz seniŋdin adınka bu at
Uluğluk saŋa ol bedüklük saŋa, seniŋdin adın yok saŋa tuş teŋe
Aya ber birikmez saŋa bir adın, kamuğ aşnuda sen sen öŋdün kedin

Turkish translation:
Yaratan, yetiştiren ve göçüren rabbim olan Tanrının adı ile söze başladım.
Kâdir ve bir olan Tanrıya çok hamd ve binlerce sena olsun; Onun için fânilik yoktur.
Kara yer ile mavi göğü, Güneş ile Ayı, gece ile gündüzü, zaman ile zamaneyi ve mahlûkları O yarattı.
İstedi ve bütün bu varlıkları yarattı; bir kere: — "ol!"— dedi, bütün diledikleri oldu.
Bütün bu yaratılmış olanlar Ona muhtaçtır; muhtaç olmayan yalnız Tanrıdır; Onun eşi yoktur.
Ey kuvvetli, kâdir, ebedî ve müstağni olan Tanrı, Senden başkasına bu ad yakışmaz.
Ululuk ve büyüklük Sana mahsustur; Sana eş ve denk olan başka biri yoktur.
Ey bir olan Tanrı, bir başkası Sana şirk koşulamaz; başta her şeyden evvel ve sonda her şeyden sonra Sensin.

English translation:
I started with the name of God, my Lord, who created, cultivated and moved.
Praise be to God, who is Powerful and one and only; there is no fraud for Him.
He created the dark earth and the blue sky, the Sun and the Moon, the night and the day, the time and all creatures.
He wanted and created all these beings; Once: - "Be!" - He said, everything He wanted came to fruition.
All these creatures need Him; the only one who does not need anything is God; He has no equal.
God, who is mighty, powerful, eternal and our master, this name does not suit anyone else than You.
Greatness belongs to You; There is no one who can match You or be equal to You.
O only God, no one can reach You; You are the first ahead of everything and last behind everything.

Despite the prevalence of Islamic wisdom from hadiths and the Qurʻān, Persian calques and Arabic and Persian vocabulary, there are no specific references to Islamic texts, nor are Arabic and Persian words used for Islamic concepts. This strengthens the argument that Islam came into Central Asia through wandering Sufis.

=== Style ===
The author of the Kutadgu Bilig used the Arabic mutaqārib metre, consisting of couplets of two rhyming 11-syllable lines, often broken down further—the first six syllables forming the first group in each line and the last five syllables forming another group. This is the earliest known application of this metre to a Turkic language. The original metre is composed of preceding short and long vowels:

Vowel 1	Vowel 2	Vowel 3
short	long	long
short	long	long
short	long	long
short	long	

Since Turkic language did not differentiate between short and long vowels, he transformed them to open and close syllables, for example:

Vowel 1	Vowel 2	Vowel 3
ya(open)	ġiz (close)	yir(close)
yı(open)	par(close)	tol(close)
dı(open)	kaf(close)	ur(close)
ki(open)	tip(close)	
be(open)	zen(close)	mek(close)
ti(open)	ler(close)	dun(close)
ya(open)	kör(close)	kin(close)
i(open)	tip(close)	

(The snow molten, the earth full of fragrance, taking off the winter clothes, the world is in new elegance.

——Kutadgu Bilig·Volume 4·2)

=== Content ===
The Kutadgu Bilig is structured around the relations between four main characters, each representing an abstract principle (overtly stated by the author). Dankoff summarises the specifics nicely in the form of a chart (Dankoff, 3):

Name	Translation	Occupation	Principle
küntoğdı	"the sun has risen" / Rising Sun	king	Justice
aytoldı	"the moon is full" / Full Moon	vizier	Fortune
ögdülmiş	"praised" / Highly Praised	sage	Intellect (or Wisdom)
oðğurmış	"awakened" / Wide Awake	Dervish	Man's Last End

=== Influences ===
Dankoff suggests that the author of the Kutadgu Bilig was attempting to reconcile the Islamic and Turkic wisdom traditions present among the Karakhanids, the former with urban roots and the latter with nomadic roots. Certainly the recent move from a more nomadic way of life changed the requirements for a good leader; the Kutadgu Bilig's agenda does appear to include instruction for how to be a good leader.

- Islamic and pre-Islamic strife poems, found in Arabic and Persian literature,
- Aytış, responsive song competition between two opponents found today among the Kazakhs and the Kyrgyz,
- Askiya, a similar style of song competition found today among the Uzbeks,
- Songs between boys and girls, such as Uzbek lapar and Kazakh bedil songs,
- Wedding songs such as Uzbek yor-yor and Kazakh jar-jar

Aside from the Islamic and Turkic influences, Dankoff posits some amount of Greek and Buddhist influence on the text.

== Selected Online Resources ==
- Kutadgu Bilig Complete Text
- Robert Dankoff — includes bibliography
- http://aton.ttu.edu/kilavuzlar.asp at the Uysal–Walker Archive of Turkish Oral Narrative — includes scanned copies of the Kutadgu Bilig in various languages
- Kutluk Veren Bilgi ve Ağustos'a Giden Yol, H. B. Paksoy, D.Phil., Ottoman Studies, posted by Anonym, 26 August
- 文化精粹之福乐智慧
- Gokmen Durmus — Upenn Master's Thesis on Turkish Wisdom

== See also ==
- Turkish literature
- Mirrors for princes
- Kut (mythology)
