= Ili Turks =

Turkic ethnic group in Xinjiang, China

Regions with significant populations
- China: Ili Kazakh Autonomous Prefecture: 120 (2019)
- Kazakhstan: 57 (2009)

Languages
- Ili Turki, Kazakh, Lanyin Mandarin

Religion
- Sunni Islam

Related ethnic groups
- Uyghurs, Äynus, Uzbeks, Kazakhs

The Ili Turks (Chinese: 土尔克人; pinyin: Tǔ'ěrkè rén; lit. 'Turk people') are a Turkic ethnic group native to Ili Kazakh Autonomous Prefecture of northern Xinjiang, China. They speak the Ili Turki language, which belongs to the Karluk branch of the Turkic languages. The oral history of the Ili Turks says that they came from the Ferghana Valley of Uzbekistan. The Chinese government does not recognize the Ili Turks as a distinct ethnic group in censuses.

The Ili Turks are nomadic herders. There are many unique animal husbandry words in their language.
