= Karakhanid language =

Extinct Karluk Turkic language

Karakhanid
- Khaqani
- Türki, Türkçe
- Native to: Kara-Khanid Khanate
- Region: Central Asia
- Era: 11th century
- Language family: Turkic: Common Turkic; Middle Turkic; Karluk; Karakhanid
- Writing system: Arabic

Language codes
- ISO 639-3: xqa
- Glottolog: qara1244

Karakhanid, also known as Khaqani Turkic (lit. meaning 'imperial' or 'royal', self referring to as 'Türki' or 'Türkçe'), was a Turkic language developed in the 11th century during the Middle Turkic period under the Kara-Khanid Khanate. It has been described as the first literary Islamic Turkic language. It is sometimes classified under the Old Turkic category, rather than Middle Turkic, as it is contemporary to the East Old Turkic languages of Orkhon Turkic and Old Uyghur. Eastern Middle Turkic languages, namely Khorezmian Turkic and later Chagatai are descendants of the Karakhanid language.

Karakhanid vocabulary was influenced by Arabic and Persian loanwords, but the language itself was still noted to be similar to the Old Uyghur language. The language was written using the Arabic script. Mahmud al-Kashgari's Dīwān Lughāt al-Turk and Yūsuf Balasaguni's Kutadgu Bilig are considered to be important literary works written in Karakhanid language.

== History ==
It was spoken between the 5th-15th centuries. It is one of the three parts of the Old Turkic period. According to Ligeti's classification, it is divided into three periods:

1. Translations of texts regarding (as well as) Mani and Buddha, and the foundation period of Uyghur written language
2. Chagatai writing language period
3. Kipchak and Oghuz language relics period

Ḥāqāni Turkic (Xāɣānī/Xāqānī Türkī) can also be called the Old Kashgar language. It was the literary language used by the Turks in this area until the beginning of the 14th century. Karakhanid Turkic and Khwarazmian Turkic in the west were replaced by Chaghatai Turkic in the Timurid period.

== Alphabet ==
| Plain | End | Middle | Start | Name | ALA-LC Transcription | Modern Turkish |
|---|---|---|---|---|---|---|
| ﺍ | ﺎ | — | | elif | a, â | a, e, â |
| ﺀ | — | | | hemze | ˀ | ', a, e, i, u, ü |
| ﺏ | ﺐ | ﺒ | ﺑ | be | b, p | b |
| ﭖ | ﭗ | ﭙ | ﭘ | pe | p | p |
| ﺕ | ﺖ | ﺘ | ﺗ | te | t | t |
| ﺙ | ﺚ | ﺜ | ﺛ | se | s | s |
| ﺝ | ﺞ | ﺠ | ﺟ | cim | c, ç | c |
| ﭺ | ﭻ | ﭽ | ﭼ | çim | ç | ç |
| ﺡ | ﺢ | ﺤ | ﺣ | ha | ḥ | h |
| ﺥ | ﺦ | ﺨ | ﺧ | hı | ẖ, x | h |
| ﺩ | ﺪ | — | | dal | d | d |
| ﺫ | ﺬ | — | | zel | z | z |
| ﺭ | ﺮ | — | | re | r | r |
| ﺯ | ﺰ | — | | ze | z | z |
| ﮊ | ﮋ | — | | je | j | j |
| ﺱ | ﺲ | ﺴ | ﺳ | sin | s | s |
| ﺵ | ﺶ | ﺸ | ﺷ | şın | ş | ş |
| ﺹ | ﺺ | ﺼ | ﺻ | sad | ṣ | s |
| ﺽ | ﺾ | ﻀ | ﺿ | dad | ż, ḍ | d, z |
| ﻁ | ﻂ | ﻄ | ﻃ | tı | ṭ | t |
| ﻅ | ﻆ | ﻈ | ﻇ | zı | ẓ | z |
| ﻉ | ﻊ | ﻌ | ﻋ | ayın | | ', h |
| ﻍ | ﻎ | ﻐ | ﻏ | gayın | ġ | g, ğ |
| ﻑ | ﻒ | ﻔ | ﻓ | fe | f | f |
| ﻕ | ﻖ | ﻘ | ﻗ | kaf | ḳ, q | k |
| ﻙ | ﻚ | ﻜ | ﻛ | kef | k, g, ŋ | k, g, ğ, n |
| ﮒ | ﮓ | ﮕ | ﮔ | gef¹ | g | g, ğ |
| ﯓ | ﯔ | ﯖ | ﯕ | nef, sağır kef | ŋ | n |
| ﻝ | ﻞ | ﻠ | ﻟ | lam | l | l |
| ﻡ | ﻢ | ﻤ | ﻣ | mim | m | m |
| ﻥ | ﻦ | ﻨ | ﻧ | nun | n | n |
| ﻭ | ﻮ | — | | vav | v, w, o, ô, ö, u, û, ü | v, o, ö, u, ü, û |
| ﻩ | ﻪ | ﻬ | ﻫ | he | h, e, a | h, e, a |
| ﻻ | ﻼ | — | | lamelif | lâ | la |
| ﻯ | ﻰ | ﻴ | ﻳ | ye | y, ı, i, î | y, ı, i, î |

== Literary works ==
Turkic elders valued the native language and left 21 works. The most important and valuable of these that have reached our hands are: the famous work Kutadgu Bilig written by Yusuf Khass Hajib, which was written in Karakhanid Turkic for the first time during the Karakhanid State, and the famous work Dīwān Lughāt al-Turk written in the same century by Mahmud al-Kashgari. Other works of Karakhanid literature are mentioned by contemporary authors but have not survived to the present. There was also a Turkic poet named Çuçu during the Karakhanid period.

== Phonology ==
Vowels are found in Karakhanid Turkic, as in all periods of Turkic language.

| Front Vowels | Back Vowels |
|---|---|
| /i/ | /ɯ/ |
| /y/ | /u/ |
| /ø/ | /o/ |
| /e/ | /a/ |
