= Uzbek language =

Karluk Turkic language

Uzbek
- Northern Uzbek, Western Karluk
- özbekça, özbek tili, ўзбекча, ўзбек тили, اوزبیکچه، اوزبیک تیلی
- Uzbek in Latin, Perso-Arabic Nastaliq, and Cyrillic scripts
- Pronunciation: Uzbek pronunciation: [ɵzˈbektʃʰæ, ɵzˈbek tʰɪˈlɪ]
- Native to: Uzbekistan, Afghanistan, Tajikistan, Kyrgyzstan, Turkmenistan, and China
- Region: Central Asia
- Ethnicity: Uzbeks
- Native speakers: 36 million (incl. both Northern Uzbek & Southern Uzbek (2020–2024)
- Language family: Turkic: Common Turkic; Karluk; Uzbek
- Early forms: Karakhanid: Khorezmian Turkic; Chagatai
- Dialects: Northern Uzbek; Southern Uzbek
- Writing system: Latin (Uzbek alphabet); Cyrillic; Perso-Arabic (Note: Used in Afghanistan, Pakistan and China); Uzbek Braille; (Uzbek alphabets)

Official status
- Official language in: Uzbekistan; Organization of Turkic States
- Recognised minority language in: China; Tajikistan; Kazakhstan; Turkmenistan; Kyrgyzstan; Russia
- Regulated by: Tashkent State University of Uzbek Language and Literature named after Navoi

Language codes
- ISO 639-1: uz
- ISO 639-2: uzb
- ISO 639-3: uzb – inclusive code Individual codes: uzn – Northern uzs – Southern
- Glottolog: uzbe1247
- Linguasphere: 44-AAB-da,
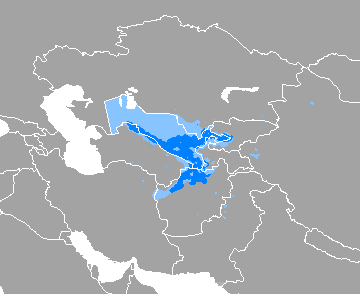
- Dark blue = majority; light blue = minority

Uzbek (Note: Cyrillic script: Ўзбекча / Ўзбек тили; Latin script: Özbekça / Özbek tili; Arabic script: اۉزبېکچه / اۉزبېک تیلی; IPA: [ɵzˈbektʃʰæ] / [ɵzˈbek tʰɪˈlɪ]) is a Karluk Turkic language spoken by Uzbeks. It is the official and national language of the Republic of Uzbekistan and formally succeeded Chagatai, an earlier Karluk language endonymically called Türki or Türkçe, as the literary language of Uzbekistan in the 1920s.

According to the Ethnologue, Southern Uzbek and Standard Uzbek are spoken as a native language by more than 36 million people around the world, making Uzbek the second-most widely spoken Turkic language after Turkish. In addition to these native speakers, there are members of many other ethnic groups such as Tajiks, Kazakhs, and Russians who live in Uzbekistan and speak Uzbek as their second language.

There are two major variants of the Uzbek language: Northern Uzbek, or simply "Uzbek", spoken in Uzbekistan, Kyrgyzstan, Kazakhstan, Tajikistan, Turkmenistan and China; and Southern Uzbek, spoken in Afghanistan and Pakistan. Both Northern and Southern Uzbek are divided into many dialects. Uzbek and Uyghur are sister languages and they constitute the Karluk or "Southeastern" branch of Turkic.

External influences on Uzbek include Persian, Russian, and Arabic. One of the most noticeable distinctions of Uzbek from other Turkic languages is the rounding of the vowel /ɑ/ to /ɒ/ under the influence of Persian. Unlike other Turkic languages, vowel harmony is almost completely lost in modern Standard Uzbek due to extensive linguistic contact with Persian, though it is still observed to some small degree in its dialects, as well as in its sister Karluk language Uyghur.

Different dialects of Uzbek show varying degrees of influence from other languages such as Kipchak and Oghuz Turkic (for example, in grammar) as well as Persian (in phonology), which gives literary Uzbek the impression of being a mixed language.

In February 2021, the Uzbek government announced that Uzbekistan plans to fully transition the Uzbek language from the Cyrillic script to a Latin-based alphabet by 1 January 2023. Similar deadlines had been extended several times. As of 2024, most institutions still use both alphabets.

== Classification ==
Uzbek is the western member of the Karluk branch of the Turkic language family, the eastern member of which is Uyghur. Karluk is classified as a dialect continuum. Northern Uzbek has been determined to be the variety most readily understood by the greatest number of speakers of Turkic languages as a whole – excluding the Siberian Turkic languages – despite its heavy Persianised character. The high degree of mutual intelligibility that exists among certain Turkic languages enables Uzbek speakers to comprehend various other, more distantly related Turkic languages with relative ease.

== Number of speakers ==
Uzbek, being the most widely spoken indigenous language in Central Asia, is as well spoken by smaller ethnic groups in Uzbekistan and in neighbouring countries.

The language is spoken by other ethnic groups outside Uzbekistan. The popularity of Uzbek media, including Uzbekfilm and RizanovaUz, has spread among the post-Soviet states, particularly in Central Asia in recent years. Since Uzbek is the dominant language in the Osh Region of Kyrgyzstan (and mothertongue of the city Osh), like the rest of Eastern, Southern and South-Eastern Kyrgyzstan (Jalal-Abad Region), the ethnic Kyrgyz are, too, exposed to Uzbek, and some speak it fluently. This is a common situation in the rest of Central Asian republics, including: the Turkistan region of Kazakhstan, northern Daşoguz Welaýat of Turkmenistan, Sughd region and other regions of Tajikistan.

The Uzbek language has a special status in countries that are common destination for immigration for Uzbekistani citizens. Other than Uzbekistan and other Central Asian Republics, the ethnic Uzbeks most commonly choose the Russian Federation in search of work. Most of them however, are seasonal workers, whose numbers vary greatly among residency within the Russian Federation. According to Russian government statistics, 4.5 million workers from Uzbekistan, 2.4 million from Tajikistan, and 920,000 from Kyrgyzstan were working in Russia in 2021, with around 5 million being ethnic Uzbeks.

Estimates of the number of native speakers of Uzbek vary widely, from 35 up to 40 million. Ethnologue estimates put the number of native speakers at 33 million across all the recognized dialects. The Swedish national encyclopedia, Nationalencyklopedin, estimates the number of native speakers to be 38 million, and the CIA World Factbook estimates 30 million. Other sources estimate the number of speakers of Uzbek to be 34 million in Uzbekistan, 4.5 million in Afghanistan, 1.63 million in Pakistan, 1.5 million in Tajikistan, about 1 million in Kyrgyzstan, 600,000 in Kazakhstan, 600,000 in Turkmenistan, and 300,000 in Russia.

The Uzbek language is taught in more than fifty higher education institutions around the world.

== Etymology ==
Historically, the language under the name Uzbek referred to a totally different language of Kipchak origin. The language was generally similar to the neighbouring Kazakh, more or less identical lexically, phonetically and grammatically. It was dissimilar to the area's indigenous and native language, known as Turki, until it was changed to Chagatai by western scholars due to its origins from the Chagatai Khanate. The ethnonym of the language itself now means "a language spoken by the Uzbeks."

== History ==
Turkic speakers probably settled the Amu Darya, Syr Darya, and Zarafshon river basins from at least 600–650 AD, gradually ousting or assimilating the speakers of the Eastern Iranian languages who had previously inhabited Sogdia, Bactria, and Khwarazm. The first Turkic dynasty in the region was the Kara-Khanid Khanate from the 9th to the 12th centuries, a confederation of Karluks, Chigils, Yagma, and other tribes.

Uzbek (along with Uyghur) can be considered the direct descendant of Chagatai, the language of great Turkic Central Asian literary development in the realm of Chagatai Khan, Timur (Tamerlane), and the Timurid dynasty (including the early Mughal rulers of the Mughal Empire). Chagatai contained a large number of Persian and Arabic loanwords. By the 19th century, it was rarely used for literary composition and had disappeared by the early 20th century.

Muhammad Shaybani (c. 1451 – 2 December 1510), the first Khan of Bukhara, wrote poetry under the pseudonym 'Shibani'. A collection of Chagatai poems by Muhammad Shaybani is currently held in the Topkapı Palace Museum manuscript collection in Istanbul. The manuscript of his philosophical and religious work, Bahr al-Khudā, written in 1508, is located in London.

Shaybani's nephew Ubaydullah Khan (1486–1540) recited the Quran skilfully and provided it with commentaries in Chagatai. Ubaydullah himself wrote poetry in Chagatai, Classical Persian, and Arabic under the literary pseudonym Ubaydiy.

For the Uzbek political elite of the 16th century, Chagatai was their native language. For example, the leader of the semi‑nomadic Uzbeks, Sheibani Khan (1451–1510), wrote poems in Chagatai.

The poet Turdiy (17th century) in his poems called for the unification of the divided Uzbek tribes: "Although our people are divided, these are all Uzbeks of ninety‑two tribes. We have different names – we all have the same blood. We are one people, and we should have one law. Sleeves, collars, and floors – it is all one robe. So the Uzbek people are united, may they be at peace."

Sufi Allayar (1633–1721) was an outstanding theologian and one of the Sufi leaders of the Khanate of Bukhara. He demonstrated his level of knowledge by writing a book entitled Sebâtü'l-Âcizîn. Sufi Allayar was widely read and highly appreciated in Central Asia.

The term Uzbek as applied to language has meant different things at different times:

- Uzbek was a vowel‑harmonised Kipchak language spoken by descendants of those who arrived in Transoxiana and who lived mainly around Bukhara and Samarkand.
- Chagatai was a Karluk language spoken by the older settled Turkic populations ('Sarts') of the region in the Fergana Valley and the Qashqadaryo Region, and in some parts of what is now the Samarqand Region; it contained a heavier admixture of Persian and Arabic and did not have vowel harmony.

During the 18th and 19th centuries, Chagatai remained the main literary language in most of Central Asia, but it underwent a period of decline. Eventually, Chagatai was mostly referred to as the language of the Sarts, the settled Turkic‑speaking populations of the Fergana Valley, although the definition of this term shifted over the decades. According to the Kazakh scholar Serali Lapin, who lived at the end of the 19th and beginning of the 20th century, "there is no special Sart language different from Uzbek". Russian researchers of the second half of the 19th century, such as L. N. Sobolev, believed that "Sart is not a special tribe, as many have tried to prove. Sart is indifferently applied to both Uzbeks and Tajiks who live in the city and are engaged in trade".

As part of the preparations for the 1924 establishment of the Soviet Republic of Uzbekistan, Chagatai was officially renamed 'Old Uzbek', which Edward A. Allworth argued "badly distorted the literary history of the region" and was used to give authors such as Ali-Shir Nava'i an Uzbek identity.

After Uzbekistan's independence, the Uzbek government opted to reform Northern Uzbek by changing its alphabet from Cyrillic to Latin in an attempt to stimulate the growth of Uzbek in the new independent state. However, the reform was never fully implemented, and as of 2025, both alphabets are widely used, from daily life to government publications and television news. Uzbek has not eclipsed Russian in the governmental sector, as Russian remains widely used in science, politics, and by the upper class of the country. However, the Uzbek internet, including the Uzbek Wikipedia, is growing rapidly.

== Writing systems ==
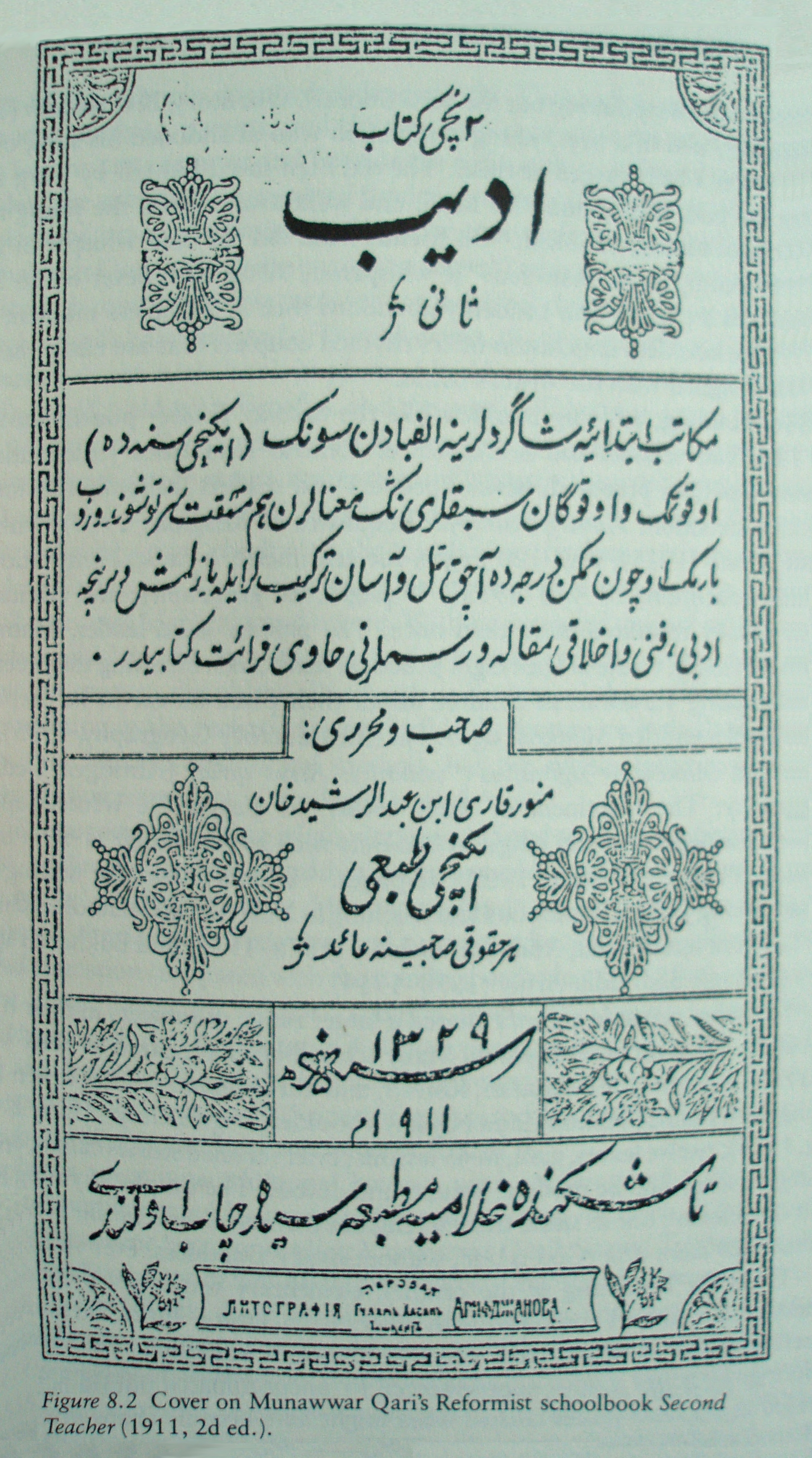
A 1911 text in the Arabic alphabet

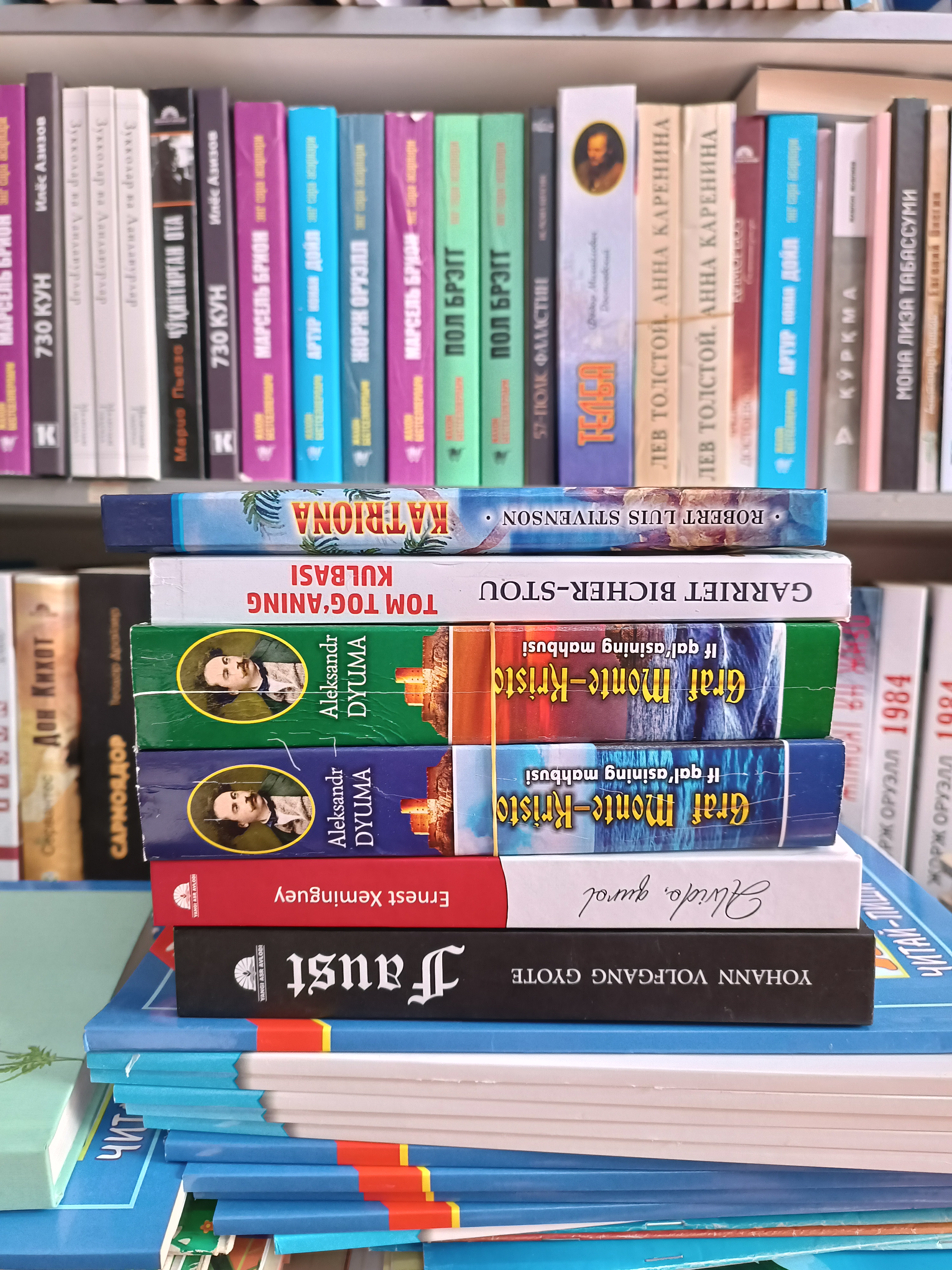
Covers of translated books in Uzbek. As can be seen, both Latin and Cyrillic scripts are widely used in the country. Most names are also transliterated, for example Yohann Volfgang Gyote is equivalent to Johann Wolfgang Goethe.

Uzbek has been written in a variety of scripts throughout history:

- 1000–1920s: The traditional Arabic script, first in the Qarakhanid standard and next in the Chagatai standard. This is seen as the golden age of the Uzbek language and literary history.
- 1920–1928: the Arabic-based Yaña imlâ alphabet.
- 1928–1940: the Latin-based Yañalif was imposed officially.
- 1940–1992: the Cyrillic script was used officially.
- Since 1992: Switch to Latin script, with heavy holdover usage of Cyrillic.

The Senate approved the amendments to the alphabet on 10 September 2026; intended to simplify the writing and digital processing of Uzbek by replacing digraphs with individual letters (Oʻ oʻ, Gʻ gʻ, Sh sh, Ch ch are replaced by Ö ö, Ğ ğ, Ş ş, Ç ç, in addition to the inclusion of the apostrophe ʼ). The reform also provides for a gradual transition in order to avoid the immediate replacement of existing documents, signs and other materials. Documents, national currency and securities issued under the previous alphabet retain their validity during the transition period.

Modern Latin alphabet
А а	B b	D d	Е е	F f	G g
Ğ ğ	H h	I i	J j	K k	L l
M m	N n	О о	Ö ö	P p	Q q
R r	S s	Ş ş	Ç ç	T t	U u
V v	X x	Y y	Z z	ʼ

Despite the official status of the Latin script in Uzbekistan, the use of Cyrillic is still widespread, especially in advertisements and signs. In newspapers, scripts may be mixed, with headlines in Latin and articles in Cyrillic.

Cyrillic alphabet
А а	Б б	В в	Г г	Д д	Е е	Ё ё
Ж ж	З з	И и	Й й	К к	Л л	М м
Н н	О о	П п	Р р	С с	Т т	У у
Ф ф	Х х	Ц ц	Ч ч	Ш ш	Ъ ъ	Ь ь
Э э	Ю ю	Я я	Ў ў	Қ қ	Ғ ғ	Ҳ ҳ

In regions with Uzbek minority presence like the western Chinese region of Xinjiang, in northern Afghanistan and in Pakistan, the Arabic-based script used since the 11th century is still in use. Agencies websites like BBC and TRT continue to publish in the Arabic script.

However, the Arabic script is no longer used in Uzbekistan except symbolically in limited texts or for the academic studies of Chagatai (the ancestor of both Uzbek and Uyghur).

Modern Arabic alphabet
ا	ب	پ	ت	ث	ج	چ	ح
خ	د	ذ	ر	ز	ژ	س	ش
ص	ض	ط	ظ	ع	غ	ف	ق
ک	گ	ل	م	ن	و	ه	ی

== Phonology ==
Words are usually stressed on the last syllable with the exception of some suffixal particles, which are not stressed. Consonants in brackets are only attested in loanwords.

=== Vowels ===
Standard Uzbek is widely taught as having six vowel phonemes. However, scholars differ in how they phonemicize [i] and [ɜ], both spelt i, since near-minimal pairs such as iz اِیز [iz] 'trace' vs. biz بِیز [bɜz] 'we' and bit بِیت [bit] 'louse' vs. bir بِیر [bɜɾ] 'one' suggest a contrast. Uzbek language has many dialects: contrary to many Turkic languages, Standard Uzbek has completely lost vowel harmony due to Persian influence, but other dialects (Kipchak Uzbek and Oghuz Uzbek) retain it.

	Front	Central	Back
Close	i ~ ɨ		u
Mid	e		o
Open	æ ~ ɑ		ɔ ~ ɒ

- Around uvular consonants:
  - /a/ goes back to [ɑ].
  - /i/ goes back to [ɨ̞].
  - /u/ goes back to [ʉ].
- Elsewhere:
  - /a/ is pronounced [æ].
  - /i/ may be shortened to [ɪ].
  - /u/ may be shortened to [ʊ].
- Despite the Uzbek language no longer having vowel harmony, some local varieties geographically close to other Turkic languages who do (like Kazakh, Turkmen and Kyrgyz) may display it:
  - /a/ goes back to [ɑ] around back vowels or uvular consonants, e.g., soya سایَه 'shadow' [sɒˈjɑ] ~ [sɒˈjæ].
  - /i/ goes back to [ɨ] around back vowels or uvular consonants, e.g., yaxşı یَخْشِی 'good' [jɑχˈʃɨ].
  - /u/ may be fronted to [y] around front vowels or [j], e.g., salom alaykum سَلام عَلَیْکُم 'Peace be upon you' [sɑˌlɒm‿ælæjˈkym].
  - /o/ may be fronted to [œ] around front vowels or [j], e.g., Özbekiston اۉزْبېکِسْتان 'Uzbekistan' [œzbekɪstɒn].

=== Consonants ===
		Labial	Dental	Alveolar	Palatal	Velar	Uvular	Glottal
Nasal		m		n		ŋ		
Plosive/ Affricate	voiceless	p	t̪	(t͡s)	t͡ʃ	k	q^{1}	(ʔ)
Plosive/ Affricate	voiced	b	d̪		d͡ʒ	ɡ		
Fricative	voiceless	ɸ		s	ʃ		χ	h
Fricative	voiced	w~v		z	(ʒ)		ʁ	
Approximant		w~v		l	j			
Tap / Flap			ɾ					

1. In word-final position and preconsonantally, /q/ is an affricate [q͡χ˖]; elsewhere, it is a pre-uvular plosive [q˖].

== Grammar ==
As a Turkic language, Uzbek is null subject, agglutinative and has no noun classes (gender or otherwise). Although Uzbek has no definite articles, it has indefinite articles bir بِیر and bitta بِیتَّه. Like other Turkic languages, nouns only conjugate as "definite" in the accusative case. An indefinite direct object is conjugated in the nominative case. The word order is subject–object–verb (SOV).

In Uzbek, there are two main categories of words: nominals (equivalent to nouns, pronouns, adjectives and some adverbs) and verbals (equivalent to verbs and some adverbs).

=== Nouns ===
Plurals are formed by suffix -lar ـلر. Nouns take the -ni ـنی suffix as a definite article when they are direct objects; unsuffixed nouns are understood as indefinite. The dative case ending -ga ـگه changes to -ka ـکه when the noun ends in -k ـک, -g ـگ, or -qa ـقه when the noun ends in -q ـق, -ğ ـغ (note *tâğqa > toqqa تاغقَّه). The possessive suffixes change the final consonants -k ـک and -q ـق to voiced -g ـگ and -ğ ـغ, respectively (yurak یُورَک > yuragim یُورَه‌گِیم). Unlike neighbouring Turkmen and Kazakh languages, due to the loss of "pronominal -n-" there is no irregularity in forming cases after possessive cases (uyida اُویِی‌دَه "in his/her/its house", as opposed to Turkmen öýünde اؤیۆنده, though saying uyinda اُویِینْدَه is also correct, but such style is mainly used in literary contexts).

Cases
Case	Suffix	Example
nominative	-∅	uy اُوی house
nominative	ـ	uy اُوی house
genitive	-ning	uyning اُوی‌نِینْگ house-GEN of (the) house
genitive	ـنِینْگ	uyning اُوی‌نِینْگ house-GEN of (the) house
dative	-ga	uyga اُوی‌گَه house-DAT to the house
dative	ـگَه	uyga اُوی‌گَه house-DAT to the house
definite accusative	-ni	uyni اُوی‌نِی house-DEF.ACC the house
definite accusative	ـنِی	uyni اُوی‌نِی house-DEF.ACC the house
locative	-da	uyda اُوی‌دَه house-LOC in the house
locative	ـدَه	uyda اُوی‌دَه house-LOC in the house
ablative	-dan	uydan اُوی‌دَن house-ABL from the house
ablative	ـدَن	uydan اُوی‌دَن house-ABL from the house
instrumental (literary)	-la	uyla اُوی‌لَه house-INS with the house
instrumental (literary)	ـلَه	uyla اُوی‌لَه house-INS with the house
similative	-day, -dek, -daqa	uyday اُوی‌دَی / uydek اُوی‌دېک / uydaqa اُوی‌دَقَه house-SIM like (a) house (in appearance)
similative	ـدَی / ـدېک / ـدَقَه	uyday اُوی‌دَی / uydek اُوی‌دېک / uydaqa اُوی‌دَقَه house-SIM like (a) house (in appearance)
equative / approximative	-ça (Note: Not to be confused with an identical diminutive suffix -cha.)	uyça اُوی‌چَه house-EQ/APRX similar to OR equal to (a) house (in amount or height)
equative / approximative	ـچَه	uyça اُوی‌چَه house-EQ/APRX similar to OR equal to (a) house (in amount or height)

Possessive cases
Possessor number	Singular	Plural
1st	-(i)m	-(i)miz
1st	ـم / ـِیم	ـمِیز / ـِیمِیز
2nd	-(i)ng	-(i)ngiz
2nd	ـنْگ / ـِینْگ	ـنْگِیز / ـِینْگِیز
3rd	-(s)i	
3rd	ـِی / ـسِی	

=== Verbs ===
Uzbek verbs are also inflected for number and person of the subject, and it has more periphrases. Uzbek uses some of the inflectional (simple) verbal tenses:

Verb conjugation system
Function	Suffix	Example
Infinitive	-moq	körmoq کۉرْماق to see
Infinitive	ـماق	körmoq کۉرْماق to see
Present-future	-a / -y	köra کۉرَه see/will see
Present-future	ـَه / ـَه‌ی	köra کۉرَه see/will see
Focal present	-yap	köryap کۉرْیَپ (currently) seeing
Focal present	ـیَپ	köryap کۉرْیَپ (currently) seeing
Momentary present	-yotir (Note: Cognate with Turkish present continuous suffix -(i)yor ـِیار)	köryotir کۉرْیاتِیر seeing (at the moment)
Momentary present	ـیاتِیر (Note: Cognate with Turkish present continuous suffix -(i)yor ـِیار)	köryotir کۉرْیاتِیر seeing (at the moment)
Present progressive	-moqda	körmoqda کۉرْماقْدَه am seeing
Present progressive	ـماقْدَه	körmoqda کۉرْماقْدَه am seeing
Present perfect	-gan	körgan کۉرْگَن have seen
Present perfect	ـگَن	körgan کۉرْگَن have seen
Simple past	-di	kördi کۉرْدِی saw
Simple past	ـدِی	kördi کۉرْدِی saw
Indirective past	-ib	körib keldi کۉرِیب کیلْدِی came (to see)
Indirective past	ـِیب	körib keldi کۉرِیب کیلْدِی came (to see)
Definite future	-(y)ajak (Note: This suffix is likely a borrowing from Ottoman Turkish, but is usually used as a noun gerund)	köracak کۉرَه‌جَک will see (at a defined point in the future)
Definite future	ـَه‌جَک / ـیَه‌جَک (Note: This suffix is likely a borrowing from Ottoman Turkish, but is usually used as a noun gerund)	köracak کۉرَه‌جَک will see (at a defined point in the future)
Obligatory future	-adigan / -ydigan	köradigan کورَه‌دِیگَن (shall) see
Obligatory future	ـَه‌دِیگَن / ـیْدِیگَن	köradigan کورَه‌دِیگَن (shall) see
Conditional	-sa ـسَه	körsa کۉرْسَه if (it) sees
Intentional	-moqçi	körmoqçi کۉرْماقْچِی (want to) see
Intentional	ـماقْچِی	körmoqçi کۉرْماقْچِی (want to) see
Imperative	-(a)y (men) -(a)ylik (biz) -∅ (sen) -(i)ng (siz) -(i)nglar (sizlar) -sin (u) -sinlar (ular)	köray! کۉرَه‌ی (1st person singular) köraylik! کۉرَه‌یْلِیک (1st person plural) kör! کۉر (2nd person informal singular) köring! کۉرِینْگ (2nd person formal singular/plural) köringlar! کۉرِینْگْلَر (2nd person formal plural) körsin! کۉرْسِین (3rd person singular) körsinlar! کۉرْسِینْلَر (3rd person plural)
Imperative	ـَه‌ی (مین) ـَه‌یْلِیک (بِیز) ـ (سین) ـِینْگ (سِیز) ـِینْگْلَر (سِیزْلَر) ـسِین (اُو) ـسِینْلَر (اُولَر)	köray! کۉرَه‌ی (1st person singular) köraylik! کۉرَه‌یْلِیک (1st person plural) kör! کۉر (2nd person informal singular) köring! کۉرِینْگ (2nd person formal singular/plural) köringlar! کۉرِینْگْلَر (2nd person formal plural) körsin! کۉرْسِین (3rd person singular) körsinlar! کۉرْسِینْلَر (3rd person plural)

==== Notes ====
Vowels marked with parentheses in suffixes are dropped if the verb root already ends in a vowel (e.g. Qara قَرَه‌ + -(i)ng ـِینْگ = Qarang! قَرَه‌نْگ "Look!").

The third‑person plural is commonly replaced by the third‑person singular.

In the simple past and conditional tenses, possessive suffixes are used at the end of the verb. Otherwise, the full pronoun suffix is used, except in the imperative. The third person is usually not marked.

=== Copula verb ===
Conjugations of the verb ermoq ('to be'), with the exception of the future tense, serve as copula verbs. The future conjugation of ermoq (Old Turkic ergäy) is not present in Uzbek.

=== Negation ===
Negative is expressed by adding -ma after the verb root, or with auxiliary verb emas. Examples:

Körmay(man) کۉرْمَی(مَن) "(I) don't see"

Körmoqçi emas(man) کۉرْماقْچِی اېمَس(مَن) "(I) don't want to see"

The particle yöq ـیۉق is used to mark the absence or prohibition of a noun or action.

=== Gerund ===
The gerund is formed with the verb root + -iş ـِیش.

Çekiş mumkin emas چېکِیش مُمْکِن اېمَس "Smoking is not allowed"

=== Pronouns ===
Pronoun	Suffix	Translation
men	-man	I
مېن	ـمَن	I
biz	-miz	we
بِيز	ـمِيز	we
sen	-san	you (formal singular and informal singular without respect)
سېن	ـسَن	you (formal singular and informal singular without respect)
senlar	-sanlar	you (informal plural without respect)
سېنْلَر	ـسَنْلَر	you (informal plural without respect)
siz	-siz	you (formal plural and informal singular with respect)
سِيز	ـسِيز	you (formal plural and informal singular with respect)
sizlar	-sizlar	you (informal plural with respect)
سِيزْلَر	ـسِيزْلَر	you (informal plural with respect)
u	-∅	he/she/it
اُو	ـ	he/she/it
ular	-lar	they
اُولَر	ـلَر	they

=== Word order ===
The word order in the Uzbek language is subject–object–verb (SOV), like all other Turkic languages. Unlike in English, the object comes before the verb and the verb is the last element of the sentence.

Men kitobni kördim
مېن کِتاب‌نِی کۉرْدِیم
1SG book-DO.SG.ACC see-PAST.IND.1SG
I saw the book

== Influences ==
The influence of Islam, and by extension Arabic, is evident in Uzbek loanwords. There is also a residual influence of Russian, dating from the period when Uzbeks were under the rule of the Russian Empire and the Soviet Union. A large number of Russian loanwords exist in Uzbek, particularly in relation to technical and modern terms, as well as everyday and sociopolitical vocabulary. Most importantly, Uzbek vocabulary, phraseology, and pronunciation have been heavily influenced by Persian through its historic roots. It is estimated that Uzbek contains about 60 Mongolian loanwords, scattered among the names of birds and other animals, household items, chemical elements, and especially military terms.

== Dialects ==
A man speaking Uzbek

Uzbek can be roughly divided into three dialect groups. The Karluk dialects, centred on Tashkent, Samarkand, Bukhara, and the Ferghana Valley, form the basis of the standard Uzbek language. This dialect group shows the greatest influence of Persian vocabulary, particularly in the Tajik‑dominated cities of Bukhara and Samarkand. The Kipchak dialect, spoken from the Surxondaryo region through north‑central Uzbekistan into Karakalpakstan, shows significant influence from the Kipchak Turkic languages, particularly in the mutation of [j] to [ʑ] as in Kazakh and Kyrgyz. The Oghuz dialect, spoken mainly in Khorezm along the Turkmenistan border, is notable for the mutation of word‑initial [k] to [g].

== By country ==
=== Turkmenistan ===
In Turkmenistan, since the 2000s, the government has conducted a forced 'Turkmenisation' of ethnic Uzbeks living in the country. During the Soviet era and in the 1990s, the Uzbek language was used freely in Turkmenistan. There were several hundred Uzbek‑language schools, and many newspapers were published in the language. Currently, however, there are only a few Uzbek schools in the country, as well as a small number of Uzbek‑language newspapers. Despite this, Uzbek is still considered one of the recognised languages of national minorities in Turkmenistan. Approximately 300,000–600,000 Uzbeks live in Turkmenistan. Most Uzbek speakers reside in Dashoghuz Velayat, as well as in Lebap Velayat, and partly in Ashghabad.

=== Russia ===
Uzbek is one of the many recognised languages of national minorities in Russia. More than 400,000 Uzbeks are citizens of the Russian Federation and reside in the country. In addition, there are between 2 and 6 million Uzbeks from the Central Asian republics (mainly Uzbekistan, Kyrgyzstan, and Tajikistan) who live in Russia as immigrants or migrants. Large Uzbek diasporas are found in major Russian cities such as Saint Petersburg, where signs in Uzbek are often visible, particularly at restaurants, eateries, barbershops, and shops selling fruit, vegetables, and textiles. There is also a small clinic with signage and labels in Uzbek.

Uzbeks in Russia tend to use the Cyrillic Uzbek alphabet, although in recent years Uzbek youth in Russia have also been actively using the Latin Uzbek alphabet. Small newspapers in Uzbek are published in large Russian cities. Some instructions for immigrants are also provided in Uzbek.

Uzbek is studied by Russian students in faculties of Turkology throughout Russia. The largest centres for Uzbek language learning in Russia are located at universities in Moscow and Saint Petersburg. There are also many Russians who have a personal interest in and love for the Uzbek language and culture, and who study the language for their own enrichment. Uzbek is one of the most studied languages among the many post‑Soviet languages in Russia.

=== Uzbek language researchers ===
Scientific interest in the history of the Uzbek language arose in the 19th century among European and Russian orientalists. Á. Vámbéry, V. Bartold, Sh. Lapin, and others wrote on the history of the Uzbek language. Considerable attention was devoted to the study of the language's history during the Soviet period. Prominent linguists who wrote on the subject include E. Polivanov, N. Baskakov, A. Kononov, U. Tursunov, A. Mukhtarov, and Sh. Rakhmatullaev.

== Sample text ==
The following is a sample text in Uzbek Arabic script of Article 1 of the Universal Declaration of Human Rights (with English version in the bottom), contrasted with a version of the text in Uzbek written in Latin script.

Uzbek Arabic	بَرْچَه آدَم‌لَر اېرْکِین، قَدْر‌قِیمَّت وَ حُقُوق‌لَرْدَه تېنْگ بۉلِیب تُوغِیلَه‌دِیلَر. اُولَر عَقْل وَ وِجْدان صاحِبِی‌دِیرْلَر وَ بَیر‌بَیرْلَرِی اِیلَه بِرادَرلَرچَه مُعامَلَه قِیلِیش‌لَرِی ضَرُور.
Uzbek Latin	Barça odamlar erkin, qadr-qimmat va huquqlarda teng bölib tuğiladilar. Ular aql va vijdon sohibidirlar va bir-birlari ila birodarlarça muomala qilişlari zarur.
Uzbek Cyrillic	Барча одамлар эркин, қадр-қиммат ва ҳуқуқларда тенг бўлиб туғиладилар. Улар ақл ва виждон соҳибидирлар ва бир-бирлари ила биродарларча муомала қилишлари зарур.
IPA	[bæ̞ɾˈt͡ʃʰæ̞ ɒd̪æ̞mˈlæ̞ɾ eɾˈkʰɪ̞n qäˈd̪ɨ̞ɾ qɨ̞mˈmät̪ ʋæ̞ hŭquqläɾˈd̪æ̞ t̪ʰeŋ bɵˈlɪ̞p t̪ʰuʁɨ̞läd̪ɪ̞ˈlæ̞ɾ ‖ uˈlæ̞ɾ äˈqɨ̞l ʋæ̞ ʋɪ̞d͡ʒˈd̪ɒn sɒhɪ̞bɪ̞dɪ̞ɾˈlæ̞ɾ ʋæ̞ bɪ̞ɾ bɪ̞ɾlæ̞ˈɾɪ̞ iˈlæ̞ bɪ̞ɾɒdæ̞ɾlæ̞ɾˈt͡ʃʰæ̞ muɒmæ̞ˈlæ̞ qɨ̞lɨ̞ʃlæ̞ˈɾɪ̞ zæ̞ˈɾuɾ ‖]
English original	All human beings are born free and equal in dignity and rights. They are endowed with reason and conscience and should act towards one another in a spirit of brotherhood.

== See also ==
- Chagatai language
- Southern Uzbek language
- Uzbek literature
- The 35th Anniversary of Independence of the Republic of Uzbekistan

== Sources ==
- Mamatov, Jahangir; Kadirova, Karamat (2008). Comprehensive Uzbek-English Dictionary. Hyattsville, Maryland: Dunwoody Press. ISBN 978-1-931546-83-6. OCLC 300453555.
- Ido, Shinji (2026). "The elusive vowel inventory of standard Uzbek". Turkic Languages. 30 (1). Harrassowitz: 80–102. doi:10.13173/TL.30.1.080. hdl:2237/0002015473. ISSN 1431-4983.
- Csató, Éva Ágnes; Johanson, Lars (1936). The Turkic Languages. London: Routledge. ISBN 0-415-41261-7. OCLC 40980286.
- Bregel, Yu (1978). "The Sarts in The Khanate of Khiva". Journal of Asian History. 12 (2): 120–151. JSTOR 41930294.
- Bodrogligeti, András J. E. (2002). Modern Literary Uzbek: A Manual for Intensive Elementary, Intermediate, and Advanced Courses. München: Lincom Europa. ISBN 3-89586-695-4. OCLC 51061526.
- Fierman, William (1991). Language Planning and National Development: The Uzbek Experience. Berlin: Mouton de Gruyter. ISBN 3-11-085338-8. OCLC 815507595.
- Ismatullaev, Khaĭrulla (1995). Modern literary Uzbek I. Bloomington, Indiana: Indiana University, Research Institute for Inner Asian Studies. ISBN 0-933070-36-5. OCLC 34576336.
- Karl, A. Krippes (1996). Uzbek-English Dictionary (Rev ed.). Kensington: Dunwoody Press. ISBN 1-881265-45-5. OCLC 35822650.
- Sjoberg, Andrée Frances (1997). Uzbek Structural Grammar. Richmond: Curzon Press. ISBN 0-7007-0818-9. OCLC 468438031.
- Waterson, Natalie (1980). Uzbek-English Dictionary. Oxford: Oxford University Press. ISBN 0-19-713597-8. OCLC 5100980.
- Republic of Uzbekistan, Ministry of Higher and Middle Eductation. Lotin yozuviga asoslangan oʻzbek alifbosi va imlosi (Latin writing based Uzbek alphabet and orthography), Tashkent Finance Institute: Tashkent, 2004.
- A. Shermatov. "A New Stage in the Development of Uzbek Dialectology" in Essays on Uzbek History, Culture and Language. Ed. Bakhtiyar A. Nazarov & Denis Sinor. Bloomington, Indiana, 1993, pp. 101–9.
