= Tokmok =

Tokmok Kyrgyz: Токмок Russian: Токмак
- City
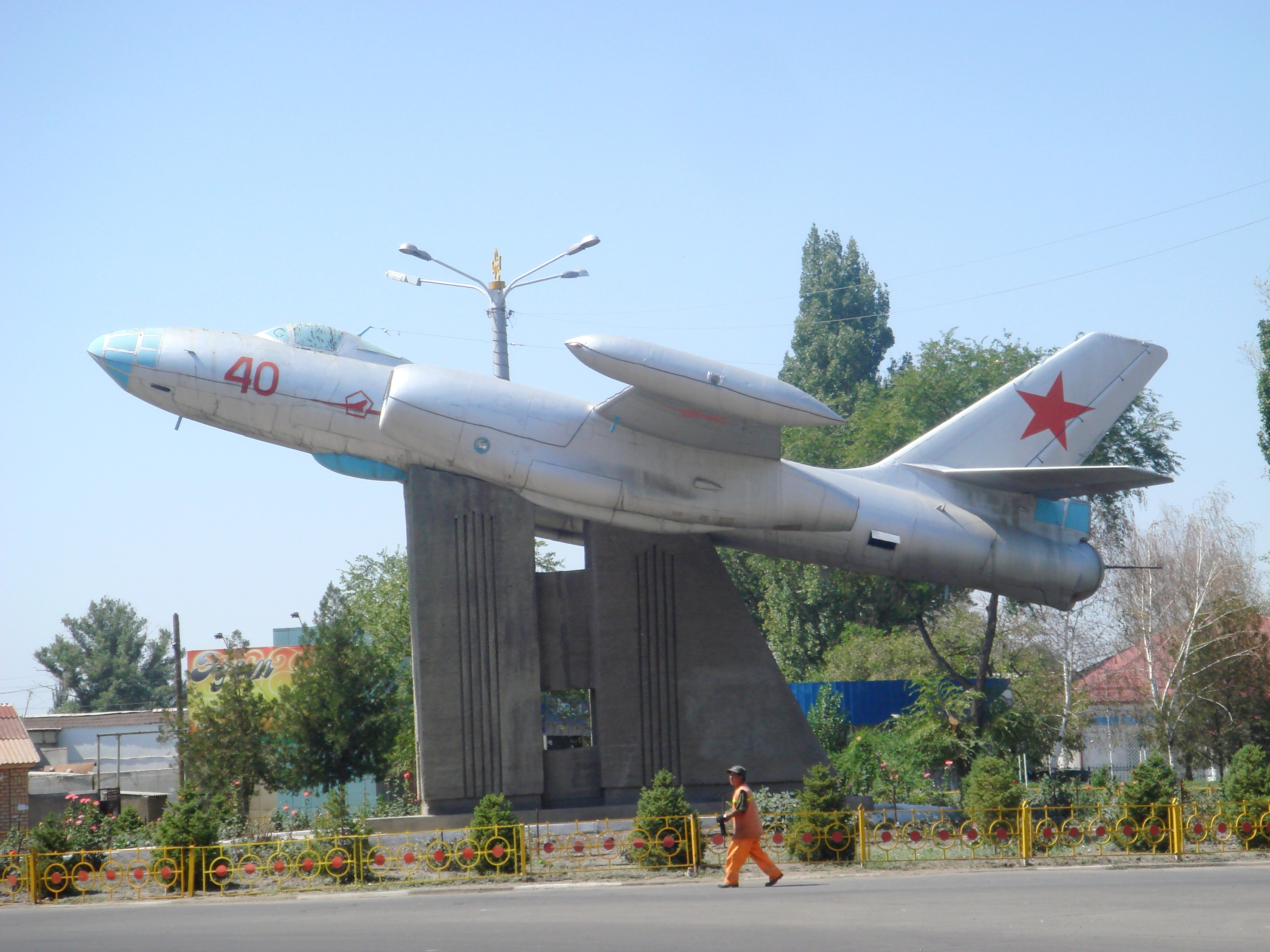
- Airplane monument in Tokmok

- Flag Seal

- Location in Kyrgyzstan
- Coordinates: 42°50′N 75°17′E
- Country: Kyrgyzstan
- Region: Chüy Region

Government
  - Mayor: Altynbek Ergeshov

Area
  - Total: 41 km^{2} (16 sq mi)
- Elevation: 816 m (2,677 ft)

Population (2024)
  - Total: 76 200
  - Density: 1.9/km^{2} (4.8/sq mi)
- Time zone: UTC+06:00 (KGT)
- Website: tokmok.org

Tokmok (Kyrgyz: Токмок, lit. 'hammer'; Russian: Токмак, romanized: Tokmak) is a city in the Chüy Valley, northern Kyrgyzstan, east of the country's capital of Bishkek, with a population of 71,443 in 2021. Its elevation is 816 m above sea level. From 2003 to 2006, it was the administrative seat of Chüy Region. Just to the north is the river Chu and the border with Kazakhstan.

Tokmok was established as a northern military outpost of the Khanate of Kokand c. 1830. Thirty years later, it fell to the Russians who demolished the fort. The modern town was founded in 1864 by Major-General Mikhail Chernyayev.

Tokmok is a district-level city of regional significance within Chüy Region. Although the city is surrounded by the region's Chüy District, it is not a part of it. Its total area is 41 km^{2} (16 sq mi).

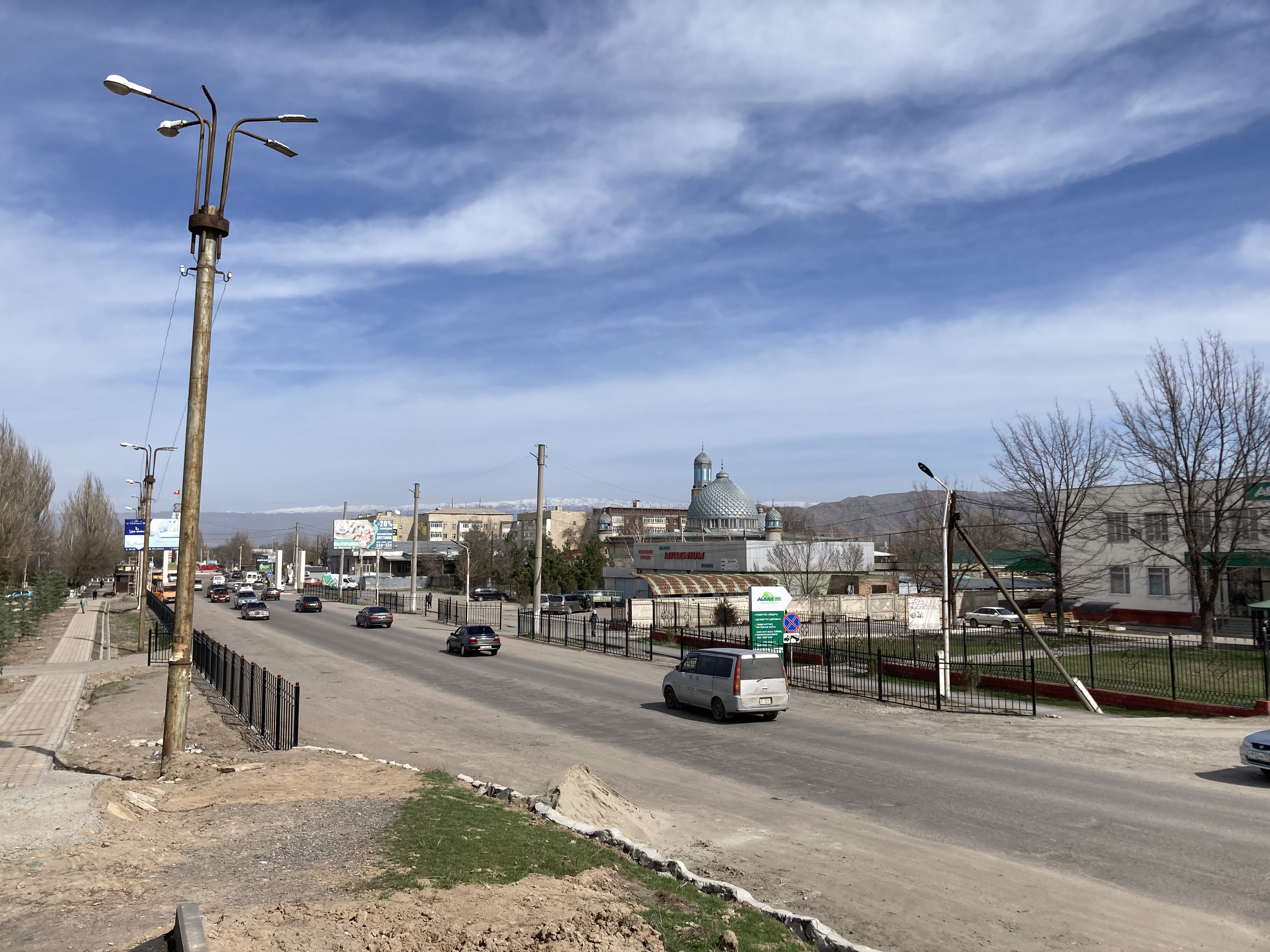
General view of Tokmok

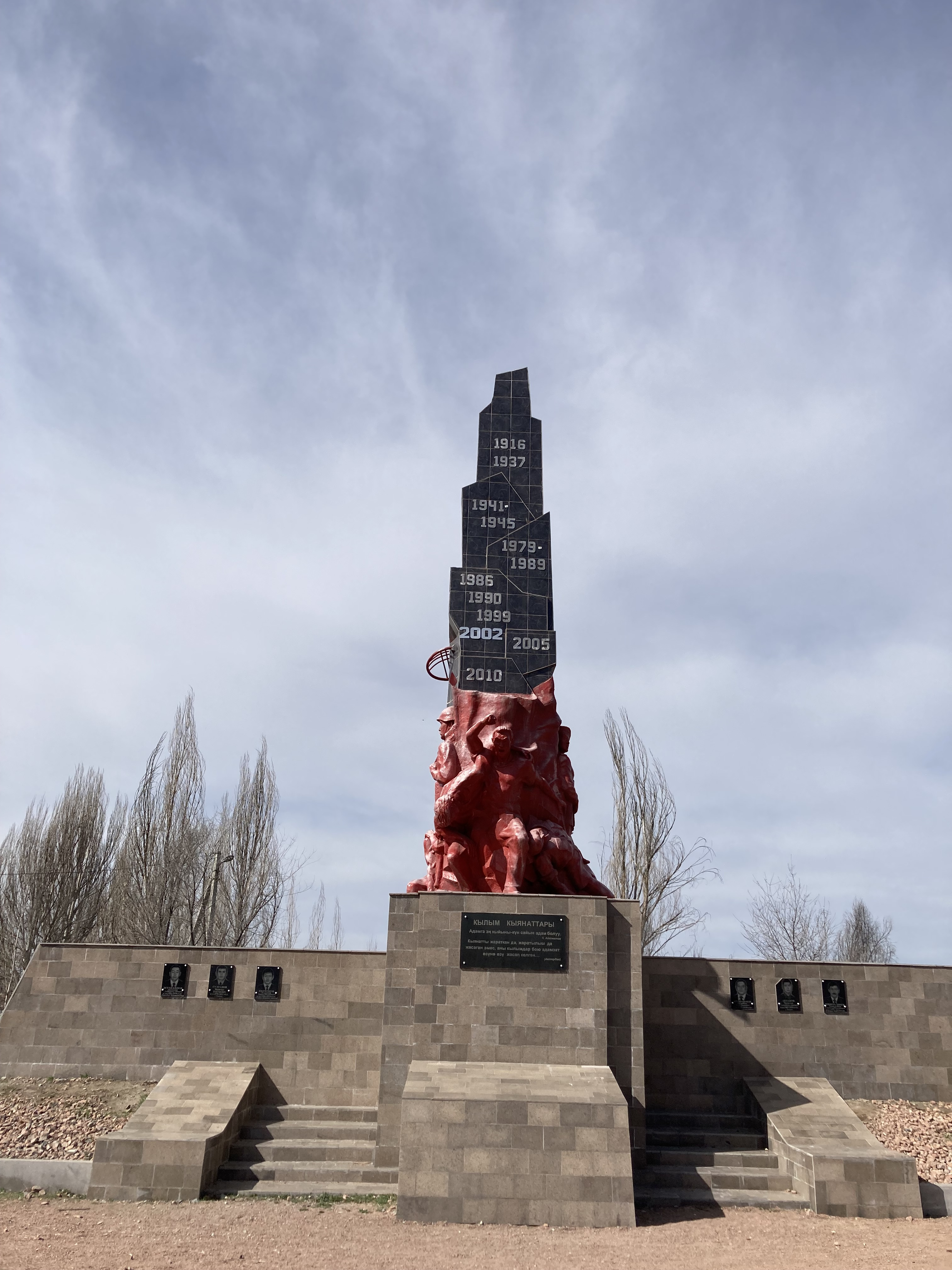
Monument in central Tokmok; the years indicate significant events in Kyrgyz history - 1916 (Central Asian Revolt), 1937 (Great Terror), 1941-1945 (Great Patriotic War), 1979-1989 (Soviet-Afghan War), 1986 (events surrounding Jeltoqsan), 1990 (declaration of Kyrgyz independence), 1999 (Batken conflict), 2002 (Aksy Tragedy), 2005 (Tulip Revolution), 2010 (2010 Kyrgyz Revolution)

== Medieval heritage ==
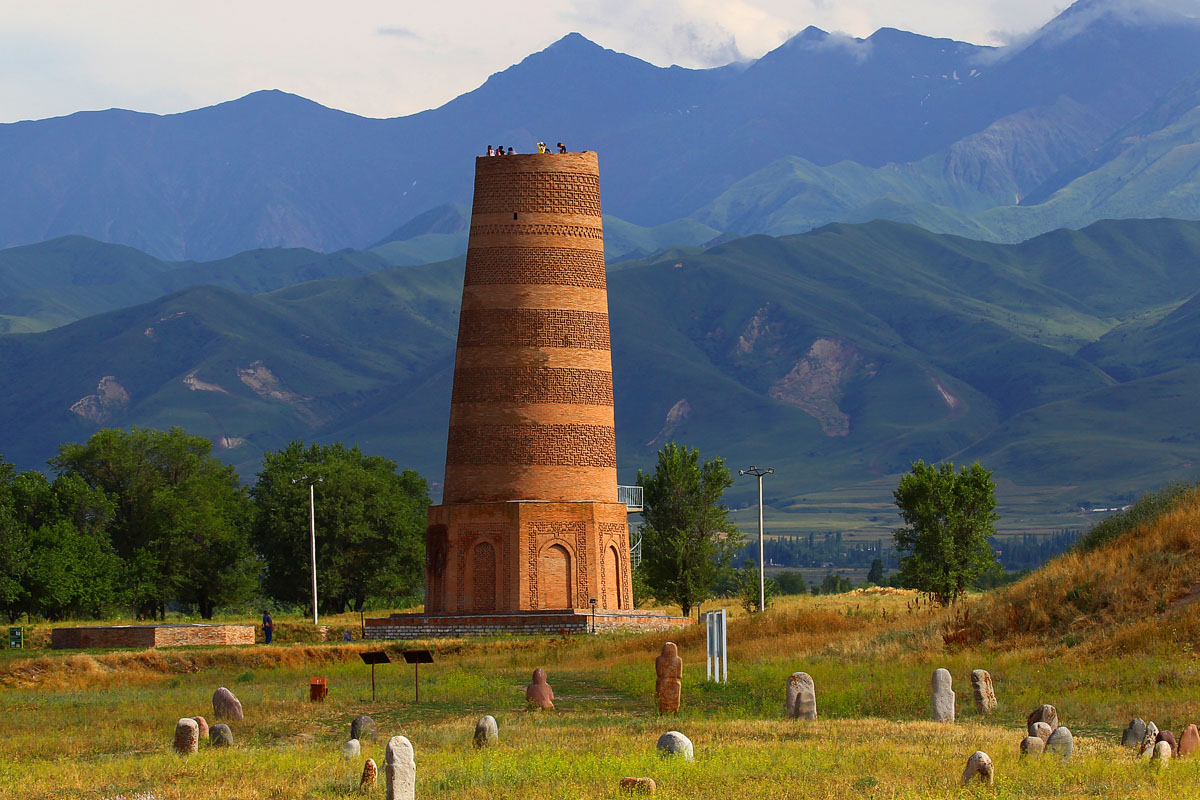
The Burana Tower

Despite its relatively modern origin, Tokmok stands in the middle of the Chüy Valley, which was a prize sought by many medieval conquerors. The ruins of Ak-Beshim, the capital of the Western Turkic Khaganate, are situated 8 km southwest from Tokmok. Yusuf Has Hajib Balasaguni, author of the Kutadgu Bilig is said to have been born in this area.

About 15 km south of Tokmok is the 11th-century Burana Tower, located on the grounds of an ancient citadel of which today only a large earthen mound remains. This is believed to be the site of the ancient city of Balasagun, founded by the Sogdians and later for some time the capital of the Kara-Khanid empire. A large collection of ancient gravestones and bal-bals is nearby. Excavated Scythian artifacts have been moved to museums in St. Petersburg and Bishkek.

== Demographics ==
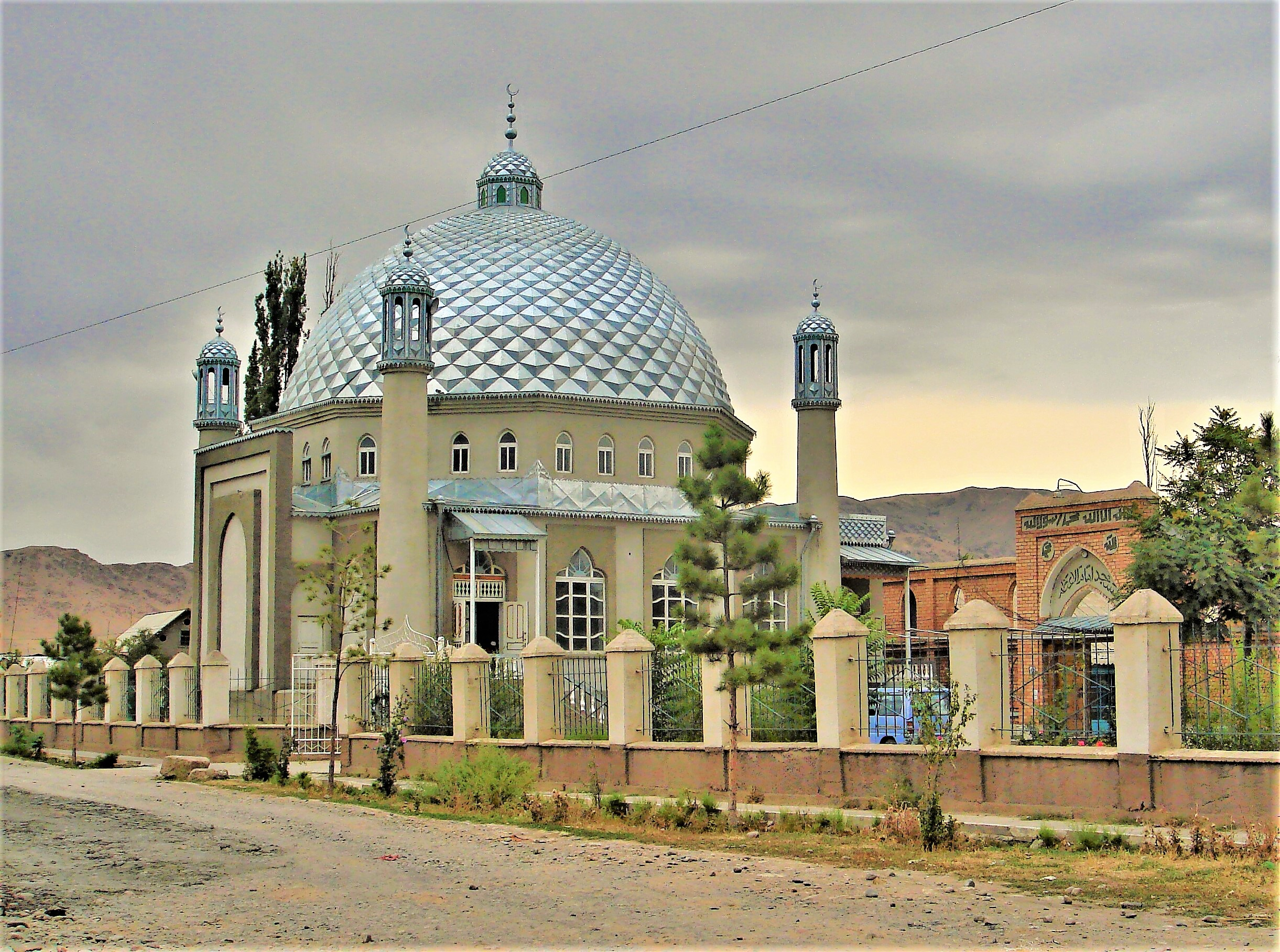
A mosque in Tokmok

According to the Population and Housing Census of 2009, the population of Tokmok was 53,231. The largest ethnic groups in Tokmok are Kyrgyz (46.8%, 2009 census), Russians (20.5%), Dungans (16.5%) and Uzbeks (8.6%).

Historical populations in Tokmok
Year	Pop.	±% p.a.
1926	15,269	—
1939	19,431	+1.87%
1959	26,559	+1.57%
1970	42,116	+4.28%
1979	58,003	+3.62%
1989	72,927	+2.32%
1999	59,409	−2.03%
2009	53,231	−1.09%
2021	71,443	+2.48%
Note: resident population; Sources:

== Geography ==
=== Climate ===
Tokmok has a hot summer Mediterranean continental climate (Köppen climate classification Dsa). The average annual temperature is 9.5 °C (49.1 °F). The warmest month is July with an average temperature of 23.3 °C (73.9 °F) and the coolest month is January with an average temperature of −5.3 °C (22.5 °F). The average annual precipitation is 434.2mm (17") and has an average of 108.3 days with precipitation. The wettest month is April with an average of 70mm (2.8") of precipitation and the driest month is August with an average of 12.1mm (0.5") of precipitation.

Climate data for Tokmok (1991-2020)
Month	Jan	Feb	Mar	Apr	May	Jun	Jul	Aug	Sep	Oct	Nov	Dec	Year
Daily mean °C (°F)	−2.3 (27.9)	−0.2 (31.6)	6.4 (43.5)	12.9 (55.2)	17.6 (63.7)	22.2 (72.0)	24.5 (76.1)	23.2 (73.8)	17.7 (63.9)	10.9 (51.6)	4.3 (39.7)	−0.7 (30.7)	11.4 (52.5)
Average precipitation mm (inches)	25.2 (0.99)	27.3 (1.07)	49.6 (1.95)	70.0 (2.76)	68.1 (2.68)	37.3 (1.47)	20.2 (0.80)	12.1 (0.48)	16.3 (0.64)	39.7 (1.56)	41.5 (1.63)	26.9 (1.06)	434.2 (17.09)
Average precipitation days (≥ 0.1 mm)	9.0	9.3	12.0	11.8	12.4	10.2	7.6	5.5	4.9	7.7	9.2	8.7	108.3
Average relative humidity (%)	74.0	75.1	68.5	55.4	53.3	46.9	44.1	43.7	46.2	56.2	67.1	75.3	58.8
Source 1: NOAA
Source 2: "The Climate of Tokmok". Weatherbase.

== Industry ==
The glass manufacturer Interglass LLC is based in Tokmok. The Tokmok plant produces about 2,800 tons of liquid glass per day and 600 tons of glass is produced of the mass per day. Annual production is 200 000 tons. At present, raw materials for glass production are mainly provided by Russia and Kazakhstan.

== Notable residents ==
- Dmitry Bivol, Russian professional boxer
- Alexander Kosenkow, Olympic German sprinter
- Maiya Maneza, Olympic Kazakh weightlifter
- Jengishbek Nazaraliev, drug rehabilitation professional and politician
- Athanasius Schneider, Kazakh Roman Catholic bishop
- Elihan Tore, president of the First Eastern Turkistan Islamic Republic
- Mátyás Rákosi, Hungary's exiled Stalinist dictator
- Dzhokhar Tsarnaev and Tamerlan Tsarnaev, perpetrators of the Boston Marathon bombing
- Dennis Wolf, German professional bodybuilder

== Twin town ==
- Érd, Hungary

== See also ==
- Suyab
