= Nāṣir al-Dīn ibn Burhān al-Dīn Rabghūzī =

Turkic judge

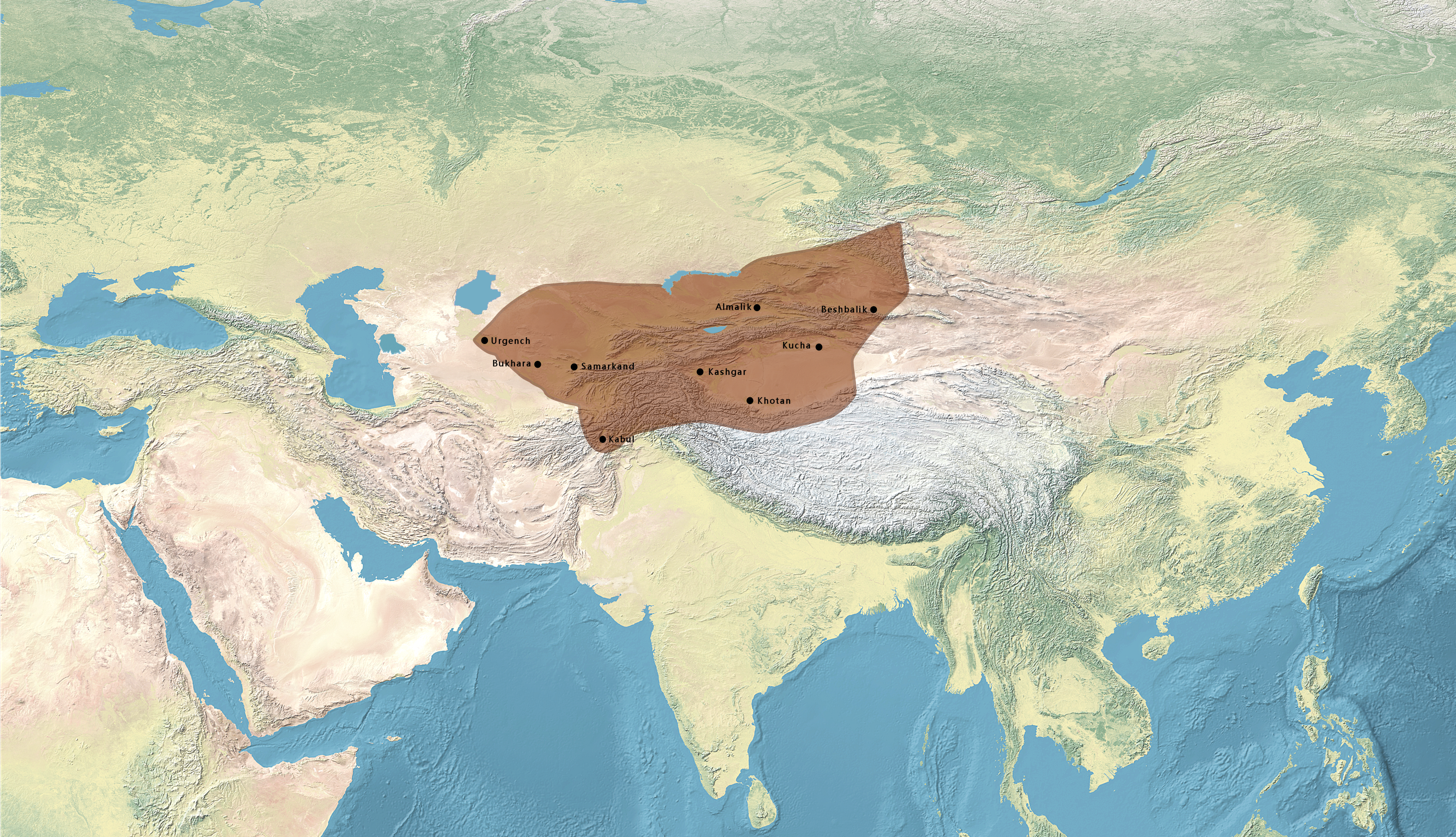
The Chagatai Khanate, with contemporary polities circa 1300, before the expansion of the Timurid Empire into Transoxonia from 1363.

Nāṣir al-Dīn ibn Burhān al-Dīn Rabghūzī was a Turkic judge living under the Chaghatay Khanate (perhaps in Transoxiana, in Ribāṭ Oghuz) around 1310 CE. He is known for translating a text generally known as Qiṣaṣ-i Rabg̲h̲ūzī into Khwārazm Turkish, affording one of the main sources for that language.

== Qiṣaṣ-i Rabghūzī ==
The only source for Rabghūzī is his Qiṣaṣ-i Rabghūzī, a text in the Islamic religious genre known as Qiṣaṣ al-Anbiyāʾ (stories about the prophets), including around seventy poems, some in Khwārazm Turkish and others in Arabic. The text was commissioned by an otherwise unknown Mongol prince called Nāṣir al-Dīn Tuḳ Bugha and completed in 1310/1311 CE. In the assessment of H. E. Boeschoten and J. O'Kane,

though inspired by Arabic and Persian predecessors, Rabghūzī's compilation of The Stories of the Prophets has a distinctly original quality with regard to its content and style. It is true that the Qurʾanic material on the prophets and Qurʾanic exegisis form the basis for the work, and Rabghūzī certainly had a firm command over the subject matter. But popular stories, epic themes and a fair amount of poetry have been integrated into the text as well. In view of the directness and the relatively simple structure of the work's language, one can well imagine that Rabghūzī's Qiṣaṣ must have been useful as a source book for preachers.

=== Sources ===
As of 2015, much work remained to be done to identify the sources of Qiṣaṣ-i Rabghūzī, but they are known to have been numerous. According to Boeschoten and O'Kane, 'no known version of the Qiṣaṣ in Arabic or Persian is very close to Rabghāuzī's version'. The most similar text in both content and language is the Nahdjatü l-farādīs by Maḥmūd ibn ʿAlī, composed sometime before 1358. Qiṣaṣ-i Rabghūzī includes around 1200 Arabic quotations from the ḥadīth and Qurʾān. It seems to have used a Persian qiṣaṣ al-anbiyāʾ by Isḥāq ibn Ibrāhīm ibn Mansūr ibn Khalafi al-Nīshābūrī, and Arabic sources include al-Ṭabarī's Tarīkh al-rusul wa-l-mulūk, ibn ʾIsḥāq's Sīrat Rasūl Allāh, al-Thaʿlabī's ʿArāʾis al-madjālis fī ḳiṣaṣ al-anbiyāʾ, and al-Kisāʾī's qiṣaṣ al-anbiyāʾ. However, Rabghūzī explains that he also used Turkic-language qiṣaṣ, little or none of which material survives in the present.

=== Manuscripts ===
The text survives in five manuscripts from the thirteenth to the sixteenth centuries CE, along with what M. van Damme has called "a host of new mss" copied from the eighteenth century to the twentieth, updating the language to then more current forms of Turkic.

=== Editions and translations ===
- Rabghuzi, Narrationes de Prophetis. Cod. Mus. Brit. Add. 7851, reproduced in facsimile, ed. by K. Grønbech (Copenhagen 1948)
- Al-Rabghūzī, Stories of the Prophets. Qiṣaṣ al-Anbiyāʾ: An Eastern Turkish Version, ed. by H. E. Boeschoten and J. O’Kane, 2nd edn, 2 vols (Leiden: Brill, 2015), ISBN 9789004294837
