= Balasagun =

Ancient Sogdian city in modern-day Kyrgyzstan

- Баласагын (Kyrgyz)
- Gobalik
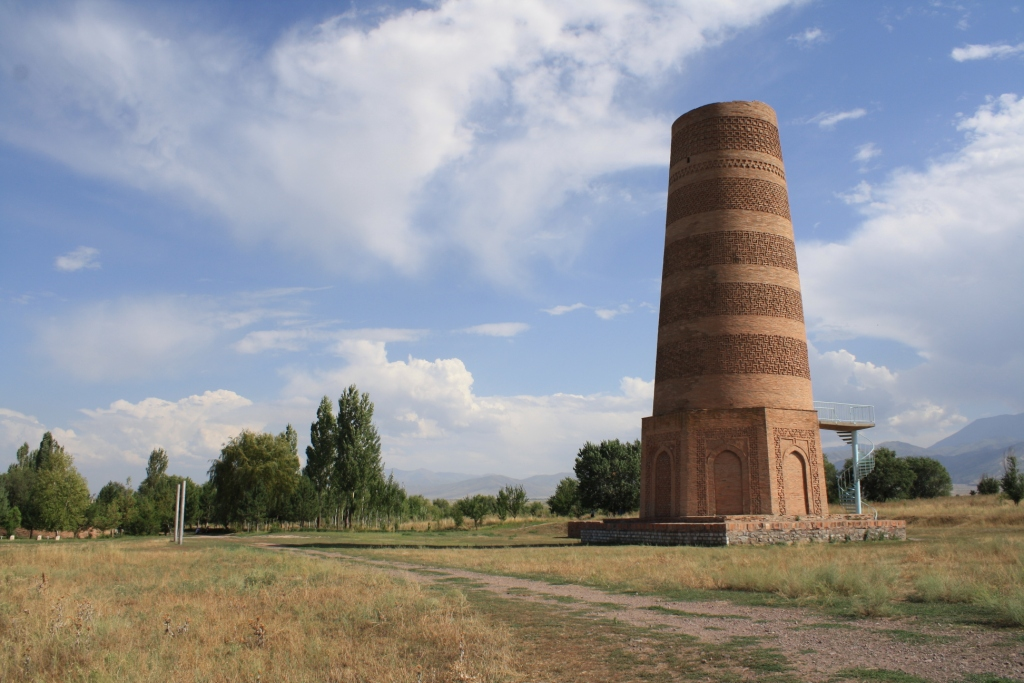
- The Burana Tower, at the site of what was once Balasagun

- Location within Kyrgyzstan Location within West and Central Asia
- 42°44′49″N 75°14′55″E
- Type: Settlement
- Location: Chüy Region, Kyrgyzstan

History
- Built: 9th century

UNESCO World Heritage Site
- Official name: City of Balasagun (Site of Burana)
- Part of: Silk Roads: the Routes Network of Chang'an-Tianshan Corridor
- Criteria: Cultural: (ii), (iii), (vi)
- Reference: 1442
- Inscription: 2014 (38th Session)

Balasagun (Kyrgyz: Баласагун or Баласагын Balasagyn; simplified Chinese: 八剌沙衮; traditional Chinese: 八剌沙袞; pinyin: Bā là shā gǔn) was an ancient city in modern-day Kyrgyzstan, located in the Chüy Valley between Bishkek and the Issyk-Kul lake. Located along the Silk Road, the ruins of the city were inscribed in 2014 on the UNESCO World Heritage List as part of the Silk Roads: the Routes Network of Chang'an-Tianshan Corridor World Heritage Site.

It was the capital of the Kara-Khanid Khanate from the 10th century until it was taken by the Qara Khitai (Western Liao dynasty) in 1134. It was then captured by the Mongols in 1218. The Mongols called it Gobalik "Pretty City". It should not be confused with Karabalghasun, now Ordu-Baliq in Mongolia, which was the capital of the Uyghur Khaganate.

Founded by the Kara-Khanid Khanate in the ninth century, Balasagun soon supplanted Suyab as the main political and economical centre of the Chüy Valley; its prosperity declined after the Mongol conquest. The poet Yūsuf Balasaguni, known for writing the Kutadgu Bilig, is thought to have been born in Balasagun in the 11th century. The city also had a sizable Nestorian Christian population; one graveyard was still in use in the 14th century. Since the 14th century, Balasagun is a village with plenty of ruins 12 kilometres (7.5 mi) southeast of Tokmok.

The Burana zone, located at the edge of Tokmok and 6 kilometres (3.7 mi) from the present village of Balasagun, was the west end of the ancient city. It includes the Burana Tower and a field of stone petroglyphs, the Kurgan stelae. The Burana Tower is a minaret built in the 11th century on the ruins of the ancient city Balasagun. It is 24 metres (79 ft) in height, though when it was first built it topped 46 metres (151 ft). Several earthquakes through the centuries caused much damage, and the current building represents a major renovation carried out in the 1970s.
