= Karluk languages =

Sub-branch of the Turkic language family

Karluk
- Qarluq, Southeastern Turkic, Turkestan Turkic
- Geographic distribution: Central Asia
- Linguistic classification: Turkic: Common Turkic; Karluk
- Early forms: Middle Turkic: Karakhanid; Khorezmian Turkic; Chagatai
- Subdivisions: Western Karluk • Northern Uzbek • Southern Uzbek; Eastern Karluk • Äynu • Ili Turki • Uyghur; Intermediate • Tor Tajik

Language codes
- Glottolog: uygh1241
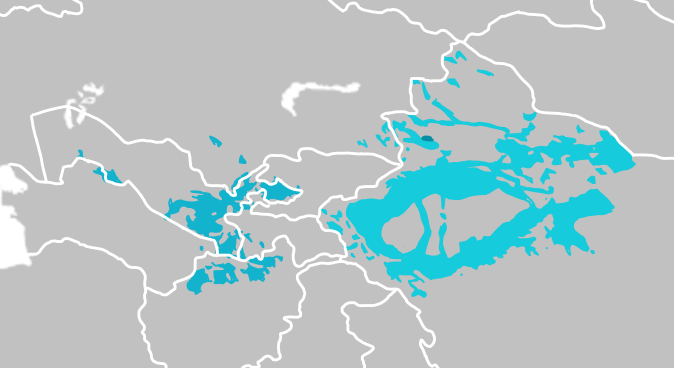
- Uzbek Uyghur Ili

The Karluk or Qarluq languages are a sub-branch of the Turkic language family that developed from the varieties spoken by Karluks, an ancient people present in Central Asia in the 5th-8th centuries CE. By far the largest languages of this branch are Uzbek and Uyghur.

Many Middle Turkic works were written in these languages. The language of the Kara-Khanid Khanate was known as Turki, Ferghani, Kashgari or Khaqani. The language of the Chagatai Khanate was the Chagatai language.

Karluk Turkic was once spoken in the Kara-Khanid Khanate, Chagatai Khanate, Timurid Empire, Mughal Empire, Yarkent Khanate and the Uzbek-speaking Khanate of Bukhara, Emirate of Bukhara, Kokand Khanate, Khiva Khanate, Maimana Khanate.

== Classification ==
=== Languages ===
- Uzbek – spoken by the Uzbeks; approximately 44 million speakers
- Uyghur – spoken by the Uyghurs; approximately 8–11 million speakers
- Ili Turki – moribund language spoken by Ili Turks, who are legally recognized as a subgroup of Uzbeks; 120 speakers and decreasing (1980)
- Chagatai – An extinct language which was once widely spoken in Central Asia, it remained a shared literary language across more than one culture there until the early 20th century.
- Karakhanid – A literary language of the Kara-Khanid Khanate (9th to the early 13th century), it is considered a standard form of Middle Turkic.
- Khorezmian Turkic – literary language of the Golden Horde that is considered a preliminary stage of the Chagatai language.

Proto-Turkic	Common Turkic	Karluk	Western	Uzbek
Proto-Turkic	Common Turkic	Karluk	Eastern	Uyghur; Ili Turki; Äynu
Proto-Turkic	Common Turkic	Karluk	Old	Chagatai †; Khorezmian Turkic †; Karakhanid †

Glottolog v.5.2 refers to the Karluk languages as "Turkestan" and classifies them as follows:

- Turkestan
  - Chagatai
  - Modern Turkestan
    - Uyghuric
      - Ainu (China)
      - Ili Turki
      - Uighur
    - Uzbek
      - Northern Uzbek
      - Southern Uzbek
