= Khorezmian Turkic =

Extinct Karluk Turkic language

- Early Chagatai
- Türki
- Region: Golden Horde, Khwarazm
- Era: 13th–14th century developed into Chagatai
- Language family: Turkic: Common Turkic; Karluk; Khorezmian Turkic
- Early form: Karakhanid

Language codes
- ISO 639-3: zkh
- Glottolog: None

Khorezmian Turkic or Khwārazm Turkish also known as Türki was a literary Turkic language of the medieval Golden Horde of Central Asia and Eastern Europe in the thirteenth and fourteenth centuries CE.

The Khwārazm region was devoid of Turkic commonality until the 11th century, when several conquests took place. In 13th century, with progressive Turkic settlements, the place became a Turkic-dominated territory.

== Relationship to other languages ==
Khorezmian Turkic is generally thought to have emerged from the Karakhanid language and to have transitioned into the Chagatai language, which would remain an important language of Central Asia until the twentieth century. Khorezmian was based on Old Turkic further to the east, though incorporating local Oghuz and Kipchak words.

== Texts in Khorezmian ==
- Gülistan bit-Türki
- Qiṣaṣ-i Rabghūzī
- Nahjatü l-Farādīs
