= Azerbaijani dialects =

Overview of dialects of Azerbaijani

Azerbaijani dialects reflect relatively minor language differences and are mutually intelligible. The Azerbaijani language has two distinct sublanguages: Northern and Southern. The International Organization for Standardization (ISO) considers Northern and Southern Azerbaijani, as two distinct languages.

Southern Azerbaijani contains many Persian and Arabic words that are not familiar to northern speakers. This began to increase in 1828. Likewise, Northern Azerbaijani contains a significant amount of Russian loanwords, which southern speakers are not familiar with. These differences have given rise to debate over whether the two are in fact the same language, or two completely separate languages.

== History ==
In his Seyahatnâme (travelogue), 17th-century Ottoman traveler Evliya Çelebi provided a detailed account of the Ajem-Turkic (or Azerbaijani) dialects in continuum with the Turkish dialects of the Armenian highlands: Diyarbekir, Bitlis, and few samples of Erzurum, Van, Hamadan, Mosul, and Tabriz. Evliya Çelebi specified the Tabrizi dialect as the speech of the Turkomans, Afshars, and "Gök-dolaq". Apart from formal samples, these dialects were further exemplified by his dialogue with the Safavid governors of Urmia, Tabriz, Shamakhi, and Yerevan.

== Dialect groups ==
The main dialect groups are Eastern (Derbent, Baku, Shamakhi, Mugan and Lankaran dialects), Western (Qazakh, Karabakh, Ganja and Ayrum dialects), Northern (Nukha, Zaqatala - Qakh dialects) and Southern (Yerevan, Nakhchivan, Ordubad and Tabriz dialects). The dialects are mutually intelligible but differ with regard to accent, syntax, and vocabulary. Eastern and northern groups of dialects were influenced by the Kypchak language.

According to Encyclopedia Iranica:

We may distinguish the following Azeri dialects: (1) eastern group: Derbent (Darband), Kuba, Shemakha (Šamāḵī), Baku, Salyani (Salyānī), and Lenkoran (Lankarān), (2) western group: Kazakh (not to be confounded with the Kipchak-Turkic language of the same name), the dialect of the Ayrïm (Āyrom) tribe (which, however, resembles Turkish), and the dialect spoken in the region of the Borchala river; (3) northern group: Zakataly, Nukha, and Kutkashen; (4) southern group: Yerevan (Īravān), Nakhichevan (Naḵjavān), and Ordubad (Ordūbād); (5) central group: Ganja (Kirovabad) and Shusha; (6) North Iraqi dialects; (7) Northwest Iranian dialects: Tabrīz, Reżāʾīya (Urmia), etc., extended east to about Qazvīn; (8) Southeast Caspian dialect (Galūgāh). Optionally, we may adjoin as Azeri (or “Azeroid”) dialects: (9) East Anatolian/Southeast Anatolian, (10) Qašqāʾī, (11) Aynallū, (12) Sonqorī, (13) dialects south of Qom, (14) Kabul Afšārī.

According to Ethnologue, North Azerbaijani has the following regional dialects, each of which is slightly different from the other: "Quba, Derbend, Baku, Shamakhi, Salyan, Lenkaran, Qazakh, Airym, Borcala, Terekeme, Qizilbash, Nukha, Zaqatala (Mugaly), Qabala, Nakhchivan, Ordubad, Ganja, Shusha (Karabakh), Karapapak, Kutkashen, Kuba". While South Azerbaijani has the following dialects: "Aynallu (Inallu, Inanlu), Karapapakh, Tabriz, Afshari (Afsar, Afshar), Shahsavani (Shahseven), Moqaddam, Baharlu (Kamesh), Nafar, Qaragozlu, Pishagchi, Bayat, Qajar".

According to the second edition of the Encyclopaedia of Islam, there are four main dialects of Azeri: 1) Baku-Shirvan, 2) Ganja-Karabakh, 3) Tabriz, and 4) Urmia.

== Dialectal features ==
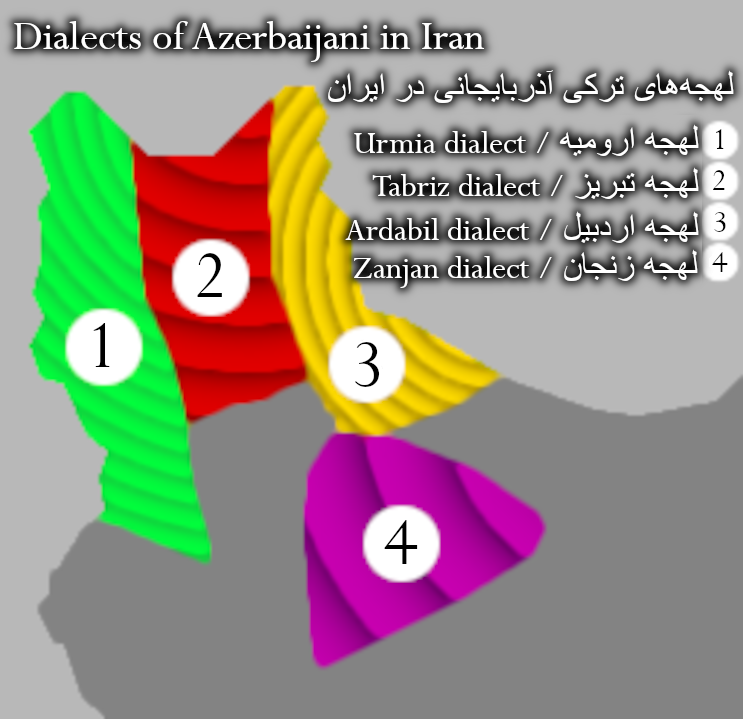
Dialects of Azerbaijani in Iranian Azerbaijan and surrounding regions, according to Yavar Dehghani

According to "A grammar of Iranian Azari" by Yavar Dehghani, dialects of South Azerbaijani in Iran are as follows: 1) Urmia, 2) Tabriz, 3) Ardabil, and 4) Zanjan. Each one of these has a set of unique features that distinguishes it.

=== Urmia dialect ===
The Urmia dialect stands out primarily by means of the fact that it, unlike the other dialects, does not have labial harmony applied to any suffix. As a result, every suffix has only two forms, one harmonized for back vowels and one for front vowels.

Suffix type	Urmia dialect		Baku Azerbaijani			
Suffix type	back	front	back rounded	back unrounded	front rounded	front unrounded
Suffix forming abstract nouns from adjectives or nouns	[-lɯx]	[-liç]	[-lux]	[-lɯx]	[-lyc]	[-lic]
Suffix forming adjectives from nouns	[-lu]	[-ly]	[-lu]	[-lɯ]	[-ly]	[-li]
Privative suffix	[-sɯz]	[-siz]	[-suz]	[-sɯz]	[-syz]	[-siz]
Suffix forming third-person singular imperative	[-sun]	[-syn]	[-sun]	[-sɯn]	[-syn]	[-sin]

=== Tabriz dialect ===
The Tabriz dialect is the most-spoken dialect of Azerbaijani in Iran. A feature distinguishing it from Baku Azerbaijani is the further fronting of palatal stops and postalveolar affricates. The voiceless postalveolar affricate and voiced postalveolar affricate are fronted to the voiceless alveolar affricate and voiced alveolar affricate, while the voiceless palatal plosive and voiced palatal plosive are fronted to the voiceless postalveolar affricate and voiced postalveolar affricate.

Baku Azerbaijani	Tabriz dialect
[tʃ]	[ts]
[dʒ]	[dz]
[c]	[tʃ]
[ɟ]	[dʒ]

Another one of the ways it differs from Baku Azerbaijani is the only partial observance of vowel harmony. One aspect of this is that the final vowel of a word does not need to harmonize with the preceding syllables in regards to either roundness or backness.

Meaning	Tabriz dialect	Baku Azerbaijani
'flock'	[syɾi]	[syɾy]
'fox'	[tyltʃi]	[tylcy]
'true'	[doɣɾi]	[doɣɾu]
'lamb'	[ɡuzi]	[ɡuzu]

Additionally, various suffixes simply ignore harmony altogether, always having a back vowel. Among others, the Baku Azerbaijani infinitive suffix [-mæc, -mɑx] is always [-mɑx], the future suffix [-ædʒæc, -ɑdʒɑx] is always [-ɑdzɑx], the first person plural imperative suffix [-æc, -ɑx] is always [-ɑx], the comparative suffix [-ɾæc, -ɾɑx] is always [-ɾɑx], the participle-deriving suffix [-ic, -yc, -ɯx, -ux] is always [-ux], and the abstract noun deriving suffix [-lic, -lyc, -lɯx, -lux] is always [-lɯx].

=== Ardabil dialect ===
The Ardabil dialect generally applies both labial and backness harmony to suffixes, but has a few exceptions to them as well, particularly the suffixes for the past tense, possessive aspect, and continuous aspect. While the possessive aspect and past tense suffixes have no labial harmonization, the continuous aspect suffix [-ej] (equivalent to Baku Azerbaijani [-iɾ, -ɯɾ, -yɾ, -uɾ]) has no harmonization of any kind. Suffixes following it ignore it and harmonize with the stem.

Meaning	Ardabil dialect	Baku Azerbaijani
'I throw'	[ɑtejɑm]	[ɑtɯɾɑm]
'I arrange'	[ɡoʃejɑm]	[ɡoʃuɾɑm]
'I come'	[dʒælejæm]	[ɟæliɾæm]
'I wait'	[dœzejæm]	[dœzyɾæm]

=== Zanjan dialect ===
In the Zanjan dialect, the second person singular suffix is [-æn, -ɑn] (as opposed to Baku Azerbaijani [-sæn, -sɑn]) and the second person plural suffix is [-iz, -ɯz, -yz, -uz] (as opposed to Baku Azerbaijani [-siz, -sɯz, -syz, -suz]).

Meaning	Zanjan dialect	Baku Azerbaijani
'You (singular) see'	[bɑxɯɾɑn]	[bɑxɯɾsɑn]
'You (plural) see'	[bɑxɯɾɯz]	[bɑxɯɾsɯz]

== Publications ==
The first comparative analysis of the Turkic (Azerbaijani) dialects was carried out by Mirza Kazimbey in his 1839 book The General Grammar of the Turkish – Tatar Language.

During 1924 - 1930, Soviet researchers collected some 60 thousand dialect words. The program was prepared to compile a comprehensive dictionary. N.I. Ashari led this program. The Academy of Sciences of the Azerbaijan SSR published a one-volume dictionary named Dialectological Dictionary of the Azerbaijani Language in 1964, which covered more than six thousand words.

At the end of the 20th century and the beginning of the 21st century, the Dictionary of the Dialects of the Azerbaijani language was published. The dictionary contained samples from Zangibasar, Sharur, Yardimli, Tebriz, Gubadli, Lachin, Kalbacar, Balakan, Qakh and Zagatala.

== See also ==
- Turkish dialects

== Bibliography ==
- Dankoff, Robert (2008). From Mahmud Kaşgari to Evliya Çelebi. Isis Press. ISBN 978-975-428-366-2. OCLC 263017665.
