= Turkomania (disambiguation) =

Turkomania is a historical geographic term for Eastern Anatolia and part of Central Anatolia as well as Azerbaijan (modern-day Turkey and parts of Azerbaijan)

Turkomania or Turcomania may also refer to:

- Two competing 14th–15th century confederations of primarily Oghuz Turkic tribes in Western Asia:
  - Kara Koyunlu, meaning "of the black sheep," who dominated northwestern Iran (modern-day Iranian Azerbaijan), Kurdistan, and South Caucasus
  - Ak Koyunlu, meaning "of the white sheep," who dominated southeastern Turkey, and later all of eastern Turkey, the Caucasus, modern-day Iraq, and Iran
- Turkmenistan, a country in Central Asia
- Turcomania, or Turkmeneli, a political term used to define the territory in which the Iraqi Turkmens historically have had a dominant population
- Turkophilia, a love of Turkey and Turkish culture

== See also ==
- Turkmenia (disambiguation)
