= Turkoman (ethnonym) =

Ethnohistorical term for Oghuz Turkic people

Turkomans
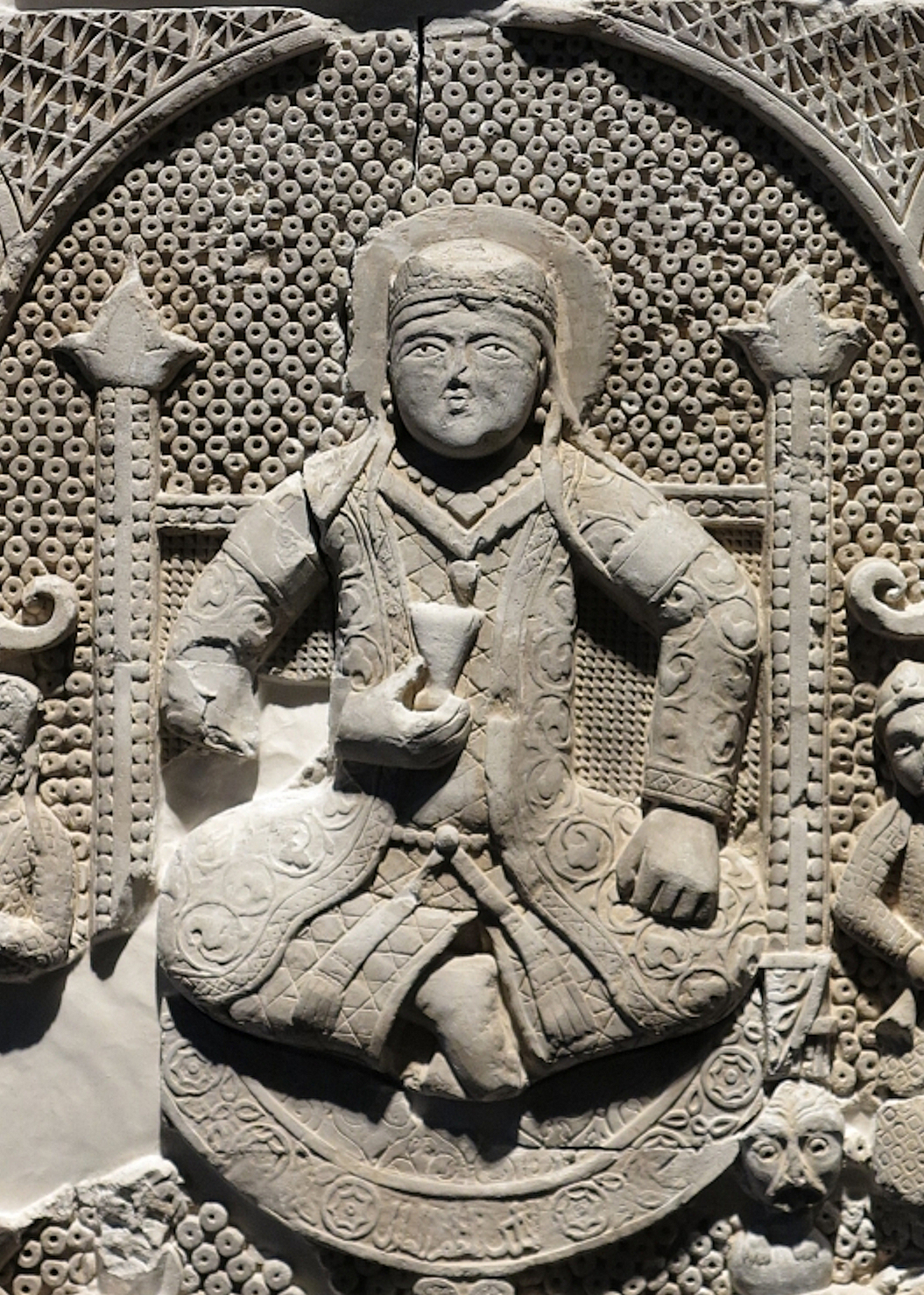
- Enthroned figure usually identified as the last Oghuz Turk Seljuk Empire ruler Tughril III (1176–1194), from Rayy, Iran. Philadelphia Museum of Art.

Regions with significant populations
- Central Asia, South Caucasus, Middle East

Languages
- Oghuz Turkic (Azerbaijani · Turkmen · Turkish)

Religion
- Islam (Sunni · Alevi · Bektashi · Twelver Shia)

Related ethnic groups
- Other Turkic people

Turkoman, also known as Turcoman (Note: also called Turkman; Middle Turkic: تُركْمانْ; Ottoman Turkish: sing. تركمن (Türkmen) or تركمان (Türkmân), pl. تراكمه (Terâkime); Azerbaijani: sing. Türkmən or Türkman, pl. Tərakimə; Turkish: Türkmen; Turkmen: Türkmen; Persian: sing. ترکمن (torkaman) or ترکمان (torkamân), pl. تراکمه (tarâkeme); Latin: Turcomannus) (English: /ˈtɜːrkəmən/), was a term for the people of Oghuz Turkic origin, widely used during the Middle Ages. Oghuz Turks were a western Turkic people that, in the 8th century A.D, formed a tribal confederation in an area between the Aral and Caspian seas in Central Asia, and spoke the Oghuz branch of the Turkic language family. Today, Turks, Azerbaijanis, and Turkmens are largely descended from the Oghuz Turks once called Turkomans.

Turkmen, originally an exonym, dates from the High Middle Ages, along with the ancient and familiar name "Turk" (türk), and tribal names such as "Bayat", "Bayandur", "Afshar", and "Kayi". By the 10th century, Islamic sources were referring to Oghuz Turks as Muslim Turkmens, as opposed to Tengrist or Buddhist Turks. The term entered into the usage of the Western world through the Byzantines in the 12th century, since by that time Oghuz Turks were overwhelmingly Muslim. Later, the term "Oghuz" was gradually supplanted by "Turkmen" among Oghuz Turks themselves, thus turning an exonym into an endonym, a process which was completed by the beginning of the 13th century.

In Anatolia, since the Late Middle Ages, "Turkmen" was superseded by the term "Ottoman", which came from the name of the Ottoman Empire and its ruling dynasty. It remains as an endonym of the semi-nomadic tribes of the Terekeme, a sub-ethnic group of the Azerbaijani people.

Today, a significant percentage of residents of Azerbaijan, Turkey, and Turkmenistan are descendants of Oghuz Turks (Turkmens), and the languages they speak belong to the Oghuz group of the Turkic language family. As of the early 21st century, this ethnonym is still used by the Turkmens of Central Asia, the main population of Turkmenistan, who have sizeable groups in Iran, Afghanistan and Russia, as well as Iraqi and Syrian Turkmens, the other descendants of Oghuz Turks.

== Etymology and history ==
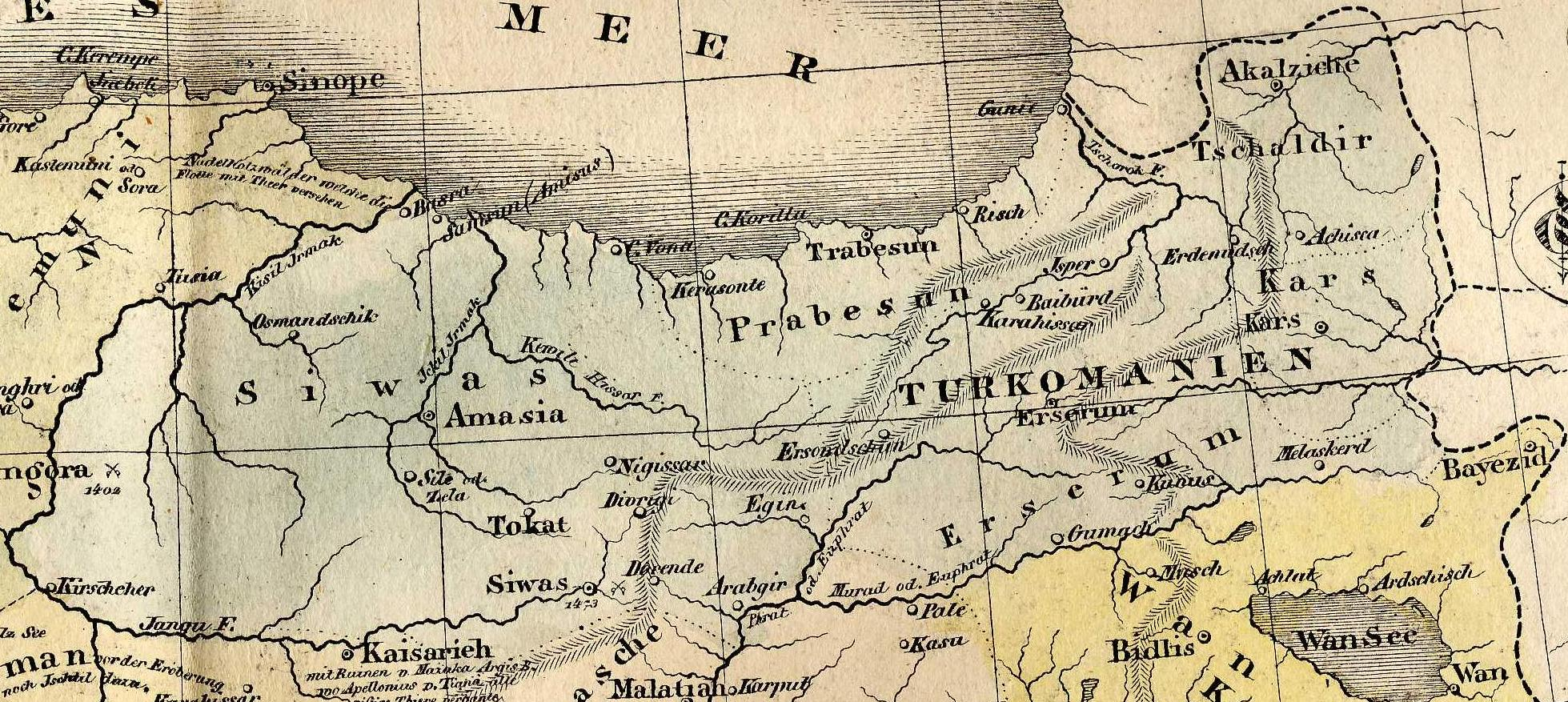
Turkomania of the Ottoman Empire

The current majority view for the etymology of the ethnonym Türkmen or Turcoman is that it comes from Türk and the Turkic emphatic suffix -men, meaning 'most Turkic of the Turks' or 'pure-blooded Turks'. A folk etymology, recorded by scholars active during the Oghuz Turkmen period, al-Biruni and Mahmud al-Kashgari, instead derives the suffix -men from the Persian suffix -mānind, with the resulting word meaning 'like a Turk'. While earlier scholarship often repeated the Persian-based derivation, more recent studies describe the Turkic suffix explanation as the more likely interpretation.

The first-known mention of the term "Turkmen", "Turkman" or "Turkoman" occurs near the end of the 10th century A.D in Islamic literature by the Arab geographer al-Muqaddasi in Ahsan Al-Taqasim Fi Ma'rifat Al-Aqalim. In his work, which was completed in 987 A.D, al-Muqaddasi writes about Turkmens twice while depicting the region as the frontier of the Muslim possessions in Central Asia. According to medieval Islamic authors Al-Biruni and al-Marwazi, the term Turkmen referred to the Oghuz who converted to Islam. There is evidence, however, that non-Oghuz Turks such as Karluks also have been called Turkomans and Turkmens; Kafesoğlu (1958) proposes that Türkmen might be the Karluks' equivalent of the Göktürks' political term Kök Türk. Later during the Middle Ages, the term was extensively employed for Oghuz Turks, a western Turkic people, who established a large tribal confederation called Oghuz Yabgu in the 8th century A.D. This polity, whose inhabitants spoke Oghuz Turkic, occupied an area between the Aral and Caspian seas in Central Asia.

The Seljuqs appeared in the beginning of the 11th century in Mawarannahr. Muslim Oghuz people, generally identified as Turkmens by then, rallied around the Qinik tribe that made up the core of the future Seljuq tribal union and the state they would create in the 11th century.

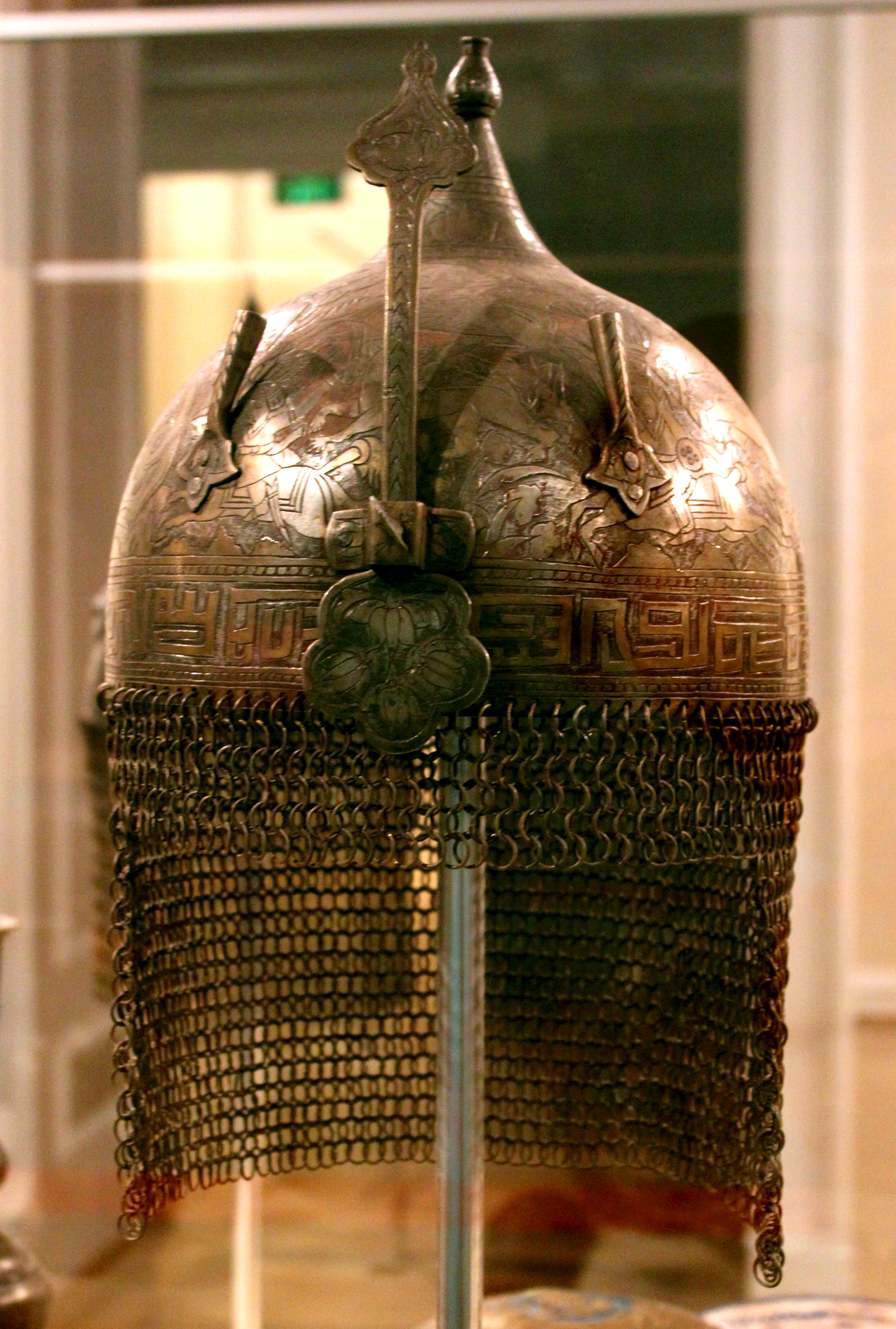
Medieval Qara Qoyunlu Turkoman helmet

Since the Seljuk era, the sultans of the dynasty created military settlements in parts of the Near and Middle East to strengthen their power; large Turkmen settlements were created in Syria, Iraq, and Eastern Anatolia. After the Battle of Manzikert, the Oghuz extensively settled throughout Anatolia and Azerbaijan. In the 11th century, Turkmens densely populated Arran. The 12th-century Persian writer al-Marwazi wrote about the arrival of Turkmens to Muslim lands, portraying them as people of noble character who are strong and persistent in battle because of their nomadic lifestyle, and calling them sultans (rulers).

"Turkoman" entered into the usage of the Western world through the Byzantines in the 12th century. By the beginning of 13th century, it became an endonym among Oghuz Turks themselves.

The Turkmens also included the Yiva and Bayandur tribes, from which the ruling clans of the states of Qara Qoyunlu and Aq Qoyunlu emerged. After the fall of Aq Qoyunlu, the Turkmen tribes—partly under their own name, for example Afshars, Hajilu, Pornak, Deger, and Mavsellu—united in a Turkmen Qizilbash tribal confederation.

== Culture ==
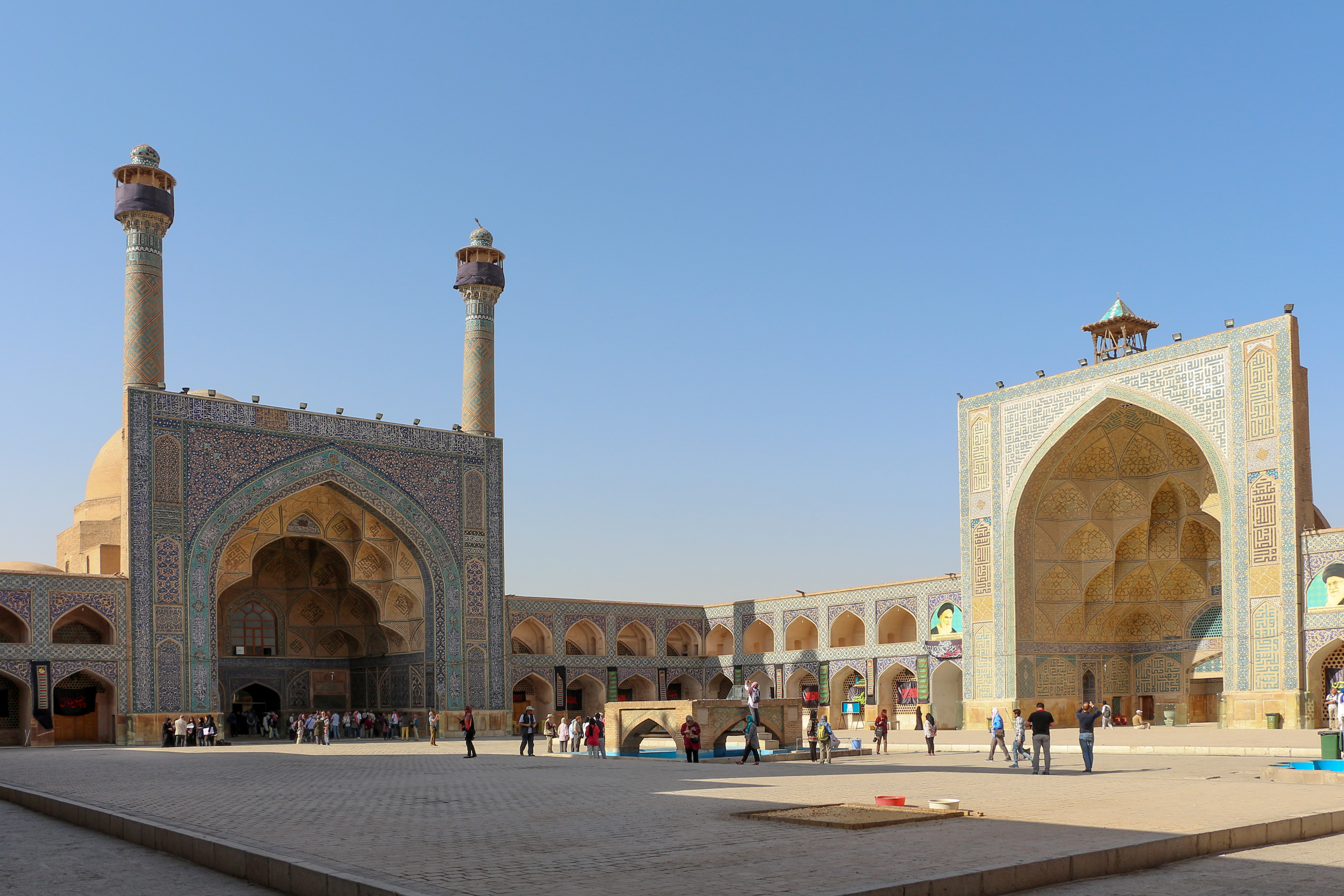
Jameh Mosque of Isfahan, modified during the Seljuq era (early 12th century)

By the 10th century A.D, Turkmens were predominantly Muslim. They later found themselves divided into Sunni and Shia branches of Islam. Medieval Turkmens markedly contributed to the expansion of Islam with their extensive conquests of previously Christian lands, specifically those of Byzantine Anatolia and the Caucasus.

=== Language ===
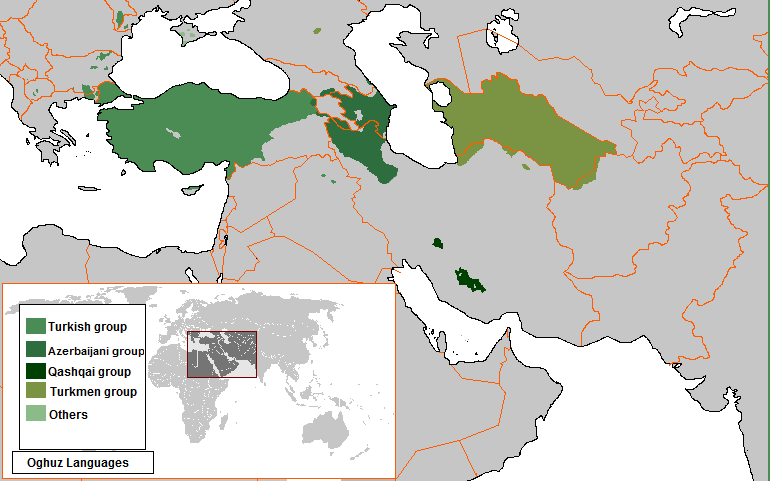
Territories where Oghuz languages are spoken today

Turkmens primarily spoke languages that belong or belonged to the Oghuz branch of Turkic languages, which included such languages and dialects as Seljuq, Old Anatolian Turkish, and old Ottoman Turkish. Kashgari had cited phonetic, lexical and grammatical features of the language of Oghuz-Turkmens; he also identified several dialects and presented a couple of examples displaying the differences.

Old Anatolian language, introduced to Anatolia by Seljuk Turkmens who migrated westward from Central Asia to Khorasan and further to Anatolia during the Seljuk expansion in the 11th century, was widely spoken by Turkmens of the area until the 15th century. It is also one of the known ancient languages within the Oghuz group of Turkic languages, along with old Ottoman. It displays certain characteristics peculiar to eastern Oghuz languages such as modern Turkmen and Khorasani Turkic languages, rather than western Oghuz languages such as Turkish or Azerbaijani. Such Old Anatolian Turkic features as bol- 'to be(come)', also present in modern Turkmen and Khorasani Turkic, is ol in modern Turkish.

=== Literature ===
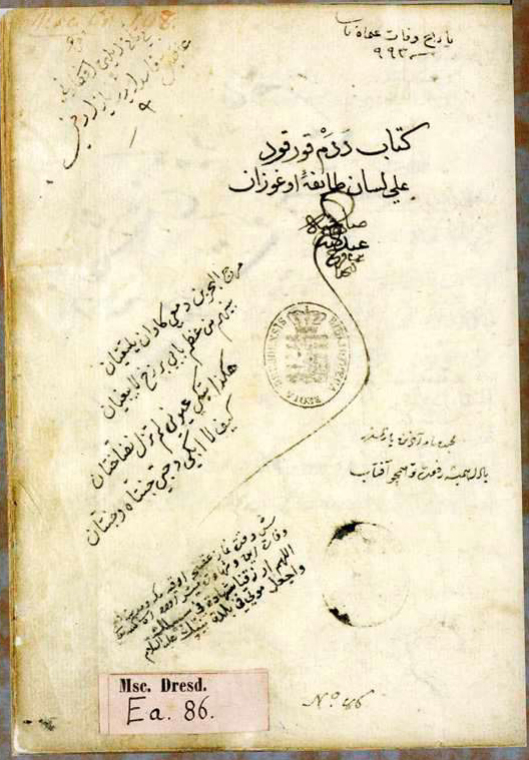
The cover of the Dresden manuscript of the Book of Dede Korkut, titled as the Book of my Grandfather Korkut according to the language of the tribe of the Oghuz

The Book of Dede Korkut is considered an Oghuz masterpiece. Other prominent works of literature produced during the High Middle Ages also include the Oghuzname, Battalname, Danishmendname, Köroğlu epics, which are part of the literary history of Azerbaijanis, Turks of Turkey, and Turkmens.

The Book of Dede Korkut is a collection of epics and stories bearing witness to the language, the way of life, religions, traditions and social norms of the Oghuz Turks.

=== Modern use ===
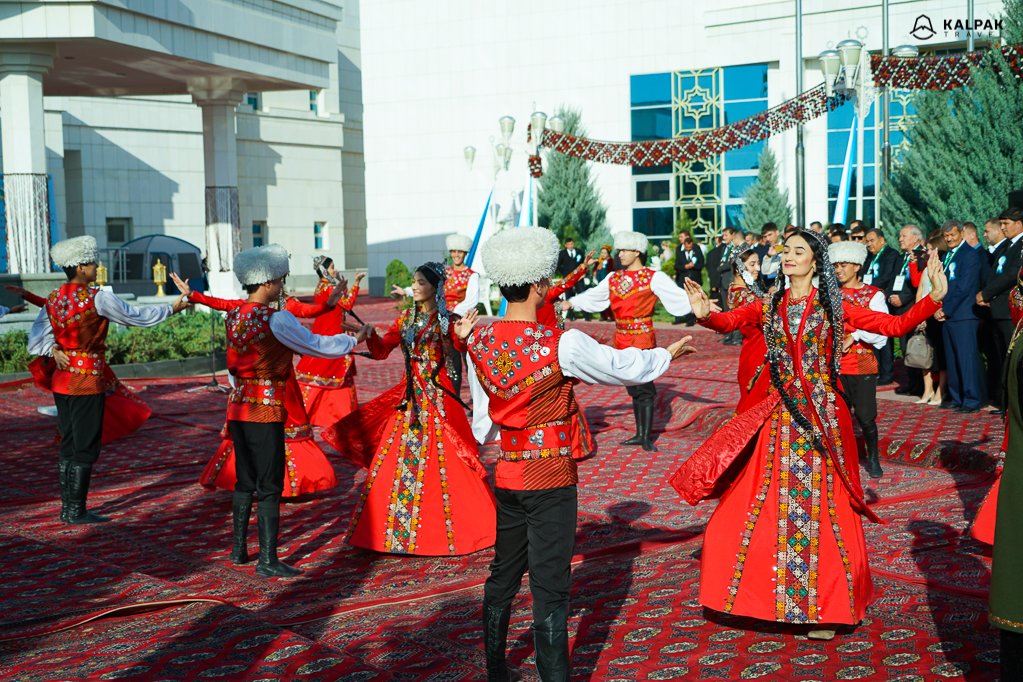
Turkmens in national costumes, Turkmenistan

In Anatolia in the late Middle Ages, the term "Turkmen" was gradually supplanted by the term "Ottomans". The Ottoman ruling class identified themselves as Ottomans until the 19th century. In the late 19th century, as the Ottomans adopted European ideas of nationalism, they preferred to return to a more common term Turk instead of Turkmen, whereas previously Turk was used to exclusively refer to Anatolian peasants.

The term continued to be used interchangeably with other ethnohistorical terms for the Turkic people of the area, including Turk, Tatar and Ajam, well into the early 20th century. In the early 21st century, "Turkmen" remains as the self-name for the semi-nomadic tribes of the Terekime, a sub-ethnic group of the Azerbaijani people.

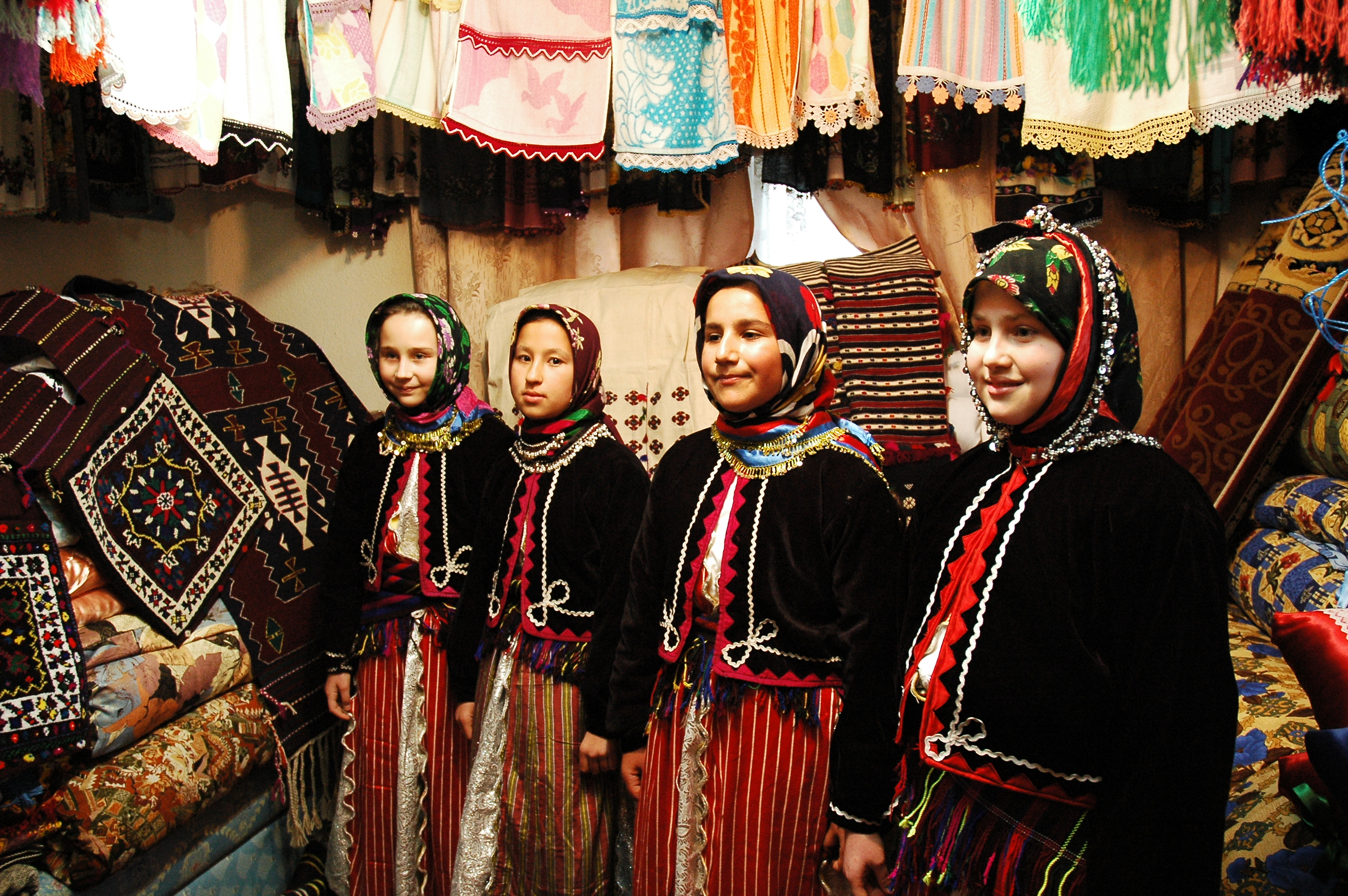
Traditional clothes of Balıkesir Yoruk villages

In the early 21st century, the ethnonyms "Turkoman" and "Turkmen" are still used by the Turkmens of Turkmenistan, who have sizeable groups in Iran, Afghanistan, Russia, Uzbekistan, Tajikistan and Pakistan, as well as Iraqi and Syrian Turkmens, descendants of the Oghuz Turks who mostly adhere to an Anatolian Turkish heritage and identity. Most Iraqi and Syrian Turkmens are descendants of Ottoman soldiers, traders, and civil servants who were taken into Iraq from Anatolia during the rule of the Ottoman Empire. Turks of Israel and Lebanon, Turkish sub-ethnic groups of Yoruks, Karapapaks (sub-ethnic group of Azerbaijanis) are also referred to as Turkmens.

"Turkoman", "Turkmen", "Turkman" and "Torkaman" were – and continue to be – used interchangeably.

== Use by non-Oghuz groups ==
Although the term has been mostly associated with Oghuz Turks, the term was also used by other non-Oghuz groups, most notably the Karluks, also renowned state builders of the Turkic world and the ancestors of modern Uzbeks and Uyghurs. The first Islamised Turkic state, the Karluk Kara-Khanid Khanate, comprised the first work called Dīwān Lughāt al-Turk, written by Mahmoud Al-Kashgari, mentioned the term and expression on some occasions, and the Karakhanid rulers also evoked themselves as "Turcomen" at some points, though infrequently; this practise continued during the Chagatai Khanate.

Timur, the Karluk ruler and founder of the Timurid Empire, in his heated exchange message with Bayezid I proclaimed himself as a Turcoman and threatened war against the Ottomans:

Believe me, you are but pismire ant: don't seek to fight the elephants for they'll crush you under their feet. Shall a petty prince such as you contend with us? But your rodomontades (braggadocio) are not extraordinary; for a Turcoman never spake with judgement. If you don't follow our counsels you will regret it.

Althoguh the Karluk descendants did not express the "Turcoman" feeling as prominently as the Oghuz, their use of "Turcoman" identity did persist, albeit via forms as "Turk" or "Turki", notably among the Uyghurs of Altishahr, the Karlukified Shaybanid Uzbeks of Transoxiana, and various South Asian Muslim groups inhabiting modern Afghanistan, Pakistan, Bangladesh and India (via the Mughal Empire); this link hung on even after the modern designations of identities of both Uzbek and Uyghur ones and played a crucial role in facilitating Oghuz–Karluk connection after the dissolution of the Soviet Union.

== List of states and dynasties of Turkoman origin ==
Name	Years	Map	Notes
Seljuq Empire	1037–1194		The ruling dynasty descended from the Qiniq tribe of the Oghuz Turks.
Ahmadilis	1122–1225	–	–
Salghurids	1148–1282	–	The ruling dynasty descended from the Salur tribe of the Oghuz Turks.
Zengids	1127–1250		–
Ottoman Empire	c. 1299–1922		Founded by Turkoman tribal leader Osman I.
Qara Qoyunlu	1374–1468		The ruling dynasty descended from the Yiwa tribe of the Oghuz Turks.
Aq Qoyunlu	1378–1508		The ruling dynasty descended from the Bayandur tribe of the Oghuz Turks.
Qutb Shahi dynasty	1518–1687		Descended from Qara Qoyunlu.
Afsharid Iran	1736–1796		The ruling Afsharid dynasty descended from the Afshar tribe of the Oghuz Turks.
Qajar Iran	1789-1925		The ruling dynasty descended from the Bayat tribe of the Oghuz Turks.

Turkomans also founded many small states in Anatolia and neighboring regions, originally one of them, the Ottomans, turned into an empire. See Anatolian beyliks.

== Sources ==
- Barthold, V., ed. (1962). The book of my grandfather Korkut. Moscow and Leningrad: USSR Academy of Sciences.
- Lee, Joo-Yup (2023). The Turkic Peoples in World History. Routledge. doi:10.4324/9781003256496. ISBN 978-1-000-90421-5.
