= Gerhard Doerfer =

German Turkologist and philologist (1920–2003)

- Born: March 8, 1920; Königsberg
- Died: December 27, 2003 (aged 83); Göttingen
- Spouse: Ingeborg Blüthner

Academic background
- Education: Free University of Berlin
- Thesis: Zur Syntax der Geheime Geschichte der Mongolen (1954)

Gerhard Doerfer (8 March 1920 – 27 December 2003) was a German Turkologist, Altaicist, and philologist best known for his studies of the Turkic languages, especially Khalaj.

== Biography ==
Doerfer was born on March 8, 1920, in Königsberg (present-day Kaliningrad) to postal official Franz Doerfer and Adina Doerfer (née Bruchmann). In 1928 his family relocated to Berlin.

Doerfer was forced to leave school in 1938 due to his opposition to the prevailing ideology. Following a period of unemployment he was conscripted into military service, where he served from 1938 to 1945. During this time he studied languages, including Samoan. Doerfer was captured as a prisoner of war, and eventually returned to Berlin in 1946.

After release from captivity in World War II, Doerfer studied off and on in Berlin, first at Humboldt University of Berlin, and later at the Free University of Berlin. He took courses in Turkic and Altaic languages under the guidance of Karl Heinrich Menges, as well as Islamic and Iranian Studies. He received his PhD on July 29, 1954, with the thesis Zur Syntax der Geheimen Geschichte der Mongolen (On the Syntax of the Secret History of the Mongols).

From 1955 to 1957 Doerfer was an assistant professor in Mainz University, where he performed editorial work on Philologiae turcicae fundamenta, a multivolume work on Turkic languages and philology. From 1957 to 1960 he worked on a post-doctoral thesis, Türkische und mongolische Elemente im Neupersischen (Turkic and Mongolic elements in Modern Persian), while also lecturing at the University of Göttingen. After the completion of this thesis he was qualified in the field of Turcology. This eventually expanded to Turkic and Altaic studies. In 1966 he became a non-tenured professor at the University of Göttingen.

Between 1968 and 1973, he conducted several expeditions to research the Turkic languages of Iran. This research led to one of the first descriptions of the Khalaj language. Other expeditions focused on the Oghuz languages of Persia, including the study of Azerbaijani and Southern Oghuz varieties (including Afshar), and the Turkic varieties of Khorasan.

In 1970 Doerfer was appointed a full professor of Turkic and Altaic Studies at the University of Göttingen.

Doerfer became an emeritus professor in 1988. During his career, he served as a visiting professor at a number of institutions, including Indiana University (1966-1969), Istanbul University (1975-1976), and the University of Mainz (1994).

in 1975–1976, Doerfer served a tour of a visiting professor at Istanbul University. In his extensive and multi-faceted studies, Doerfer investigated Mongolian and Turkic elements in Persian language, culture, and folklore, wrote his four-volume Türkische und mongolische Elemente im Neupersischen (1963–75), and contributed greatly to the study of Persian-Turkic language contacts (1967).

Doerfer served as the executive president of the Societas Uralo-Altaica from 1975 to 1979, as the president of the Deutsch-Türkische Gesellschaft until 1990.

Doerfer dismissed the validity of the Altaic language family concept. He argued that the words and features shared by Turkic, Mongolic, and Tungusic were cultural borrowings, and that any other similarities should be attributed to chance resemblances. He further states that if all three languages were genetically connected, the comparative language losses over time should be random instead of being limited to the geographical fringes of the family.

== Awards and honors ==
- Three Festchrifts in honor of his 65th, 70th, and 75th birthdays, including:
  - "Gerhard Doerfer Festschrift: essays presented to Gerhard Doerfer on his seventieth birthday by his colleagues and students". Journal of Turkish Studies. 13. 1989. ISSN 0743-0019.
  - Erdal, Marcel; Tezcan, Semih, eds. (1995). Beläk Bitig: Sprachstudien für Gerhard Doerfer zum 75. Geburtstag. Wiesbaden: Harrassowitz. ISBN 9783447036542. OCLC 37499771.
- Honorary member, Turkish Language Association
- Honorary member, Kőrösi Csoma Society
- Honorary member, Societas Uralo-Altaica, 1988
- Honorary doctorate, University of Szeged, 1992

== Selected works ==
- 1954 "Zur Syntax der Geheime Geschichte der Mongolen" (The syntax of the Secret History of the Mongols), ZDMG 113, 1963, S.87-111.
- 1963 "Der Numerus im Mandschu" (The number in the Manchu), Wiesbaden
- 1963 "Bemerkungen zur Verwandtschaft der sog. altaische Sprachen", (Remarks on the relationship of the so-called Altaic languages), In Gerhard Doerfer, Türkische und mongolische Elemente im Neupersischen, Bd. I: Mongolische Elemente im Neupersischen, 1963, 51–105, Wiesbaden, Franz Steiner Verlag.
- 1963–1975 "Türkische und mongolische Elemente im Neupersischen", Bd. I-IV, Wiesbaden, Franz Steiner Verlag, 1963–1975.
- 1967 "Türkische Lehnwörter im Tadschikischen" Wiesbaden [Abhandlungen für die Kunde des Morgenlandes XXXVII, 3].
- 1973 "Lautgesetze und Zufall: Betrachtungen zum Omnicomparativismus", Innsbrucker Beiträge zur Sprachwissenschaft 10.
- 1974 "Ist das Japanische mit den altaischen Sprachen verwandt?" Zeitschrift der Deutschen Morgenländischen Gesellschaft 114.1.
- 1985 "Mongolo-Tungusica"/Tungusica. 3, Wiesbaden, Otto Harrassowitz
- 1988 "Grundwort und Sprachmischung : eine Untersuchung an Hand von Körperteilbezeichnungen", Münchener ostasiatische Studien, vol.47, Stuttgart, Franz Steiner Verlag
- "Azeri Turkish" at Encyclopædia Iranica
