= Old Turkish language =

Old Turkish language may refer to:

- Old Anatolian Turkish language
- Old Turkic language
- Ottoman Turkish language
