= Yerevan dialect (Azerbaijani) =

Dialect of Azerbaijani

The Yerevan dialect or Īravān dialect (Azerbaijani: İrəvan dialekti) is one of the dialects of the Azerbaijani language, spoken near Yerevan.

== Classification ==
According to the German philologist Gerhard Doerfer, the Yerevan dialect belongs to Southern group of Azerbaijani language, along with the Nakhichevan and Ordubad dialects. The Azerbaijani philologist Memmedaghi Shiraliyev also places it in the Southern group to which he also adds the Tabriz dialect.

Soviet philologist Ninel Hajiyeva has concurred with Shiraliyev.

Swedish philologist Lars Johanson and Azerbaijani philologist Elbrus Azizov did not mention the Yerevan dialect in their classification of Azeri dialects.

== History ==
According to Shiraliyev, the formation of the Yerevan dialect dates back to the 18th century when the Iranian Khanates of the Caucasus were formed in the areas of modern-day Armenia and Azerbaijan.
