= Ajem-Turkic =

Early form of the Azerbaijani language

- Ajami Turkic, Middle Azeri, Middle Azerbaijanian
- ترکی عجمی Türkī-yi ʿacemī
- Region: Iran, Eastern Anatolia, Southern Caucasus, Dagestan
- Era: 15th—18th centuries Developed into Azerbaijani
- Language family: Turkic: Common Turkic; Oghuz; Western Oghuz; Ajem-Turkic
- Early form: Old Anatolian Turkish
- Writing system: Perso-Arabic alphabet

Language codes
- ISO 639-3: –
- Glottolog: None

Ajem-Turkic or Ajami Turkic (ترکی عجمی; Türkī-yi ʿacemī, lit. 'Persian Turkic' or 'Persian Turkish'), also known as Middle Azeri or Middle Azerbaijanian (Azerbaijani: Orta azərbaycanca), was the Turkic vernacular spoken in Iran between the 15th and 18th centuries. The modern Azerbaijani language is descended from this language.

== Name ==
The term is derived from earlier designations, such as lingua turcica agemica, or Turc Agemi, which was used in a grammar book composed by the French writer Capuchin Raphaël du Mans (died 1696) in 1684. Local texts simply called the language türkī. During "the Isfahan phase of the Safavids", it was called ḳızılbaşī in contrast to rūmī (Ottoman) and çaġatā’ī (Chagatai), due to its close relation to dialects spoken by the Qizilbash.

== History ==
Ajem-Turkic is descended from Old Anatolian Turkish, and is part of the southwestern branch of Oghuz languages. The language first appears during the 15th-century in Azerbaijan, eastern Anatolia, and Iran. It went through more development under the Turkic dynasties of the Aq Qoyunlu (1378–1503) and the Qara Qoyunlu (1374–1468), and also in Safavid Iran (1501–1736), whose ruling dynasty stemmed from Iranian Kurdistan, before migrating to Iranian Azerbaijan and alongside Persian, adopting the Turkic language of the region, using the qizilbash (Turkic tribes) in the military to come to power. Under them, Ajami Turkic, alongside Persian, Armenian, Georgian and Circassian, was used at the court and uniquely in the military which consisted of the qizilbash, and also was a lingua franca from northern to southern Iran according to some, while according to Stephen Dale, its use largely stayed confined to the Azerbaijan province and remained a tribal/qizilbash phenomenon. According to Swedish Turkologist Lars Johanson, Ajemi Turkic was an "Azerbaijanian koiné" that functioned as lingua franca in the Caucasus region and in southeastern Dagestan, and was widely spoken at the court and in the army.

According to É. Á. Csató et al.:

A specific Turkic language was attested in Safavid Persia during the 16th and 17th centuries, a language that Europeans often called Persian Turkish ("Turc Agemi", "lingua turcica agemica"), which was a favourite language at the court and in the army because of the Turkic origins of the Safavid dynasty. The original name was just turki, and so a convenient name might be Turki-yi Acemi. This variety of Persian Turkish must have been also spoken in the Caucasian and Transcaucasian regions, which during the 16th century belonged to both the Ottomans and the Safavids, and were not fully integrated into the Safavid empire until 1606. Though that language might generally be identified as Ajem-Turkic, it is not yet possible to define exactly the limits of this language, both in linguistic and territorial respects. It was certainly not homogenous—maybe it was an Azerbaijanian-Ottoman mixed language, as Beltadze (1967:161) states for a translation of the gospels in Georgian script from the 18th century.

Ajem-Turkic had already emerged as both a spoken and written language during the fifteenth century under the Aq Qoyunlu and Qara Qoyunlu states. Following 1500, however, the language evolved into a supraregional variety extending beyond Azerbaijan itself and functioning across a wider geographical area. This development took place within the broad region centered around political hubs such as Isfahan. Prominent representatives of early Ajem-Turkic literature include poets such as Jahan Shah, Imadaddin Nasimi, and Muhammad Fuzuli.

Ajem-Turkic functioned as a lingua franca in the Caucasus and southeastern Dagestan. It was widely used within governmental circles and the military. During the Safavid period, the majority of soldiers reportedly spoke only this language and had no knowledge of Persian. Recording his observations in 1617–1618, the Italian traveler Pietro della Valle noted that Ajem-Turkic differed from Ottoman Turkish and contained numerous “Tatar,” that is, eastern Turkic, lexical elements.

Nevertheless, scholarly knowledge of Ajem-Turkic or Middle Azerbaijani remains limited, as only a small number of texts have been subjected to linguistic analysis. Bellér-Hann examined the Tarikh-i Khatai, dating from 1494–1495. Within the broader context of Oghuz languages, the relationships between Ajami Turkic and Ottoman Turkish, the classification of Azerbaijani dialects in Iran, and the linguistic processes resulting from contact between Persian and Turkic have constituted major areas of research within the Iran–Turk Project at the University of Mainz. In the sixteenth century, several works were translated into Ajem-Turkic by Muhammad al-Katib, known as Nishati Shirazi. One of these was the Shuhadanama, a 1538 translation of Husayn Va'iz Kashifi’s Persian work Rawzat al-Shuhada, originally composed in 1502–1503. The work contains narratives and legends concerning Ali ibn Abi Talib and the martyrs of Karbala. Another important translation was the Kitab-i Tazkira-i Shaykh Safi, completed in 1542, which was based on Safvat al-Safa, written by Ibn Bazzaz in 1358. This work recounts the life of Shaykh Safi al-Din.

Both works are regarded as important Shiʿi texts. Nishati explained that the purpose of these translations was to benefit Turkic students, Sufis, mullahs belonging to Turkic tribes, and the people of Turkestan who lacked knowledge of Persian. Among the political figures who encouraged this undertaking during the reign of Shah Tahmasp I were the Qizilbash official Shahqulu Khalifa Zulkadar, who held high-ranking positions in Tabriz and Qazvin at the Safavid court, and Qazi Khan Takalu, governor of Shiraz.

== Literature ==
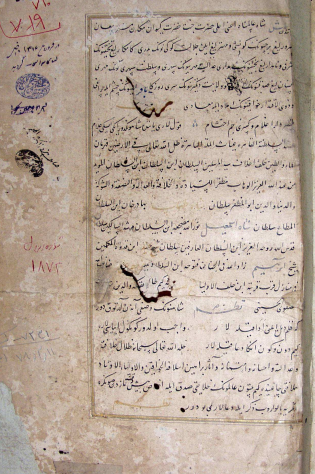
Tezkire-i Şeyh Safi

Since its appearance, Ajem-Turkic was heavily impacted by Persian, especially in its syntax. The Persian design of merging clauses which Ajem-Turkic had inherited from Old Anatolian Turkish was strengthened due to its continuous contact with Persian.

Sources for the study of Ajemi-Turkic include the prose texts of Nishati (fl. 1530–after 1557), the Tarih-i Hatai (Tārīkh-i Khatāʾī, 1494/95); Şühedaname (Şühedānāme, 1539); and Tezkire-i Şeyh Safi (Tedhkire-i Şeykh Ṣafī, 1542/43).

== Sources ==
- Stein, Heidi (2014). "Ajem-Turkic". In Fleet, Kate; Krämer, Gudrun; Matringe, Denis; Nawas, John; Rowson, Everett (eds.). Encyclopaedia of Islam (3rd ed.). Brill Online. ISSN 1873-9830.
