= Kesik Baş =

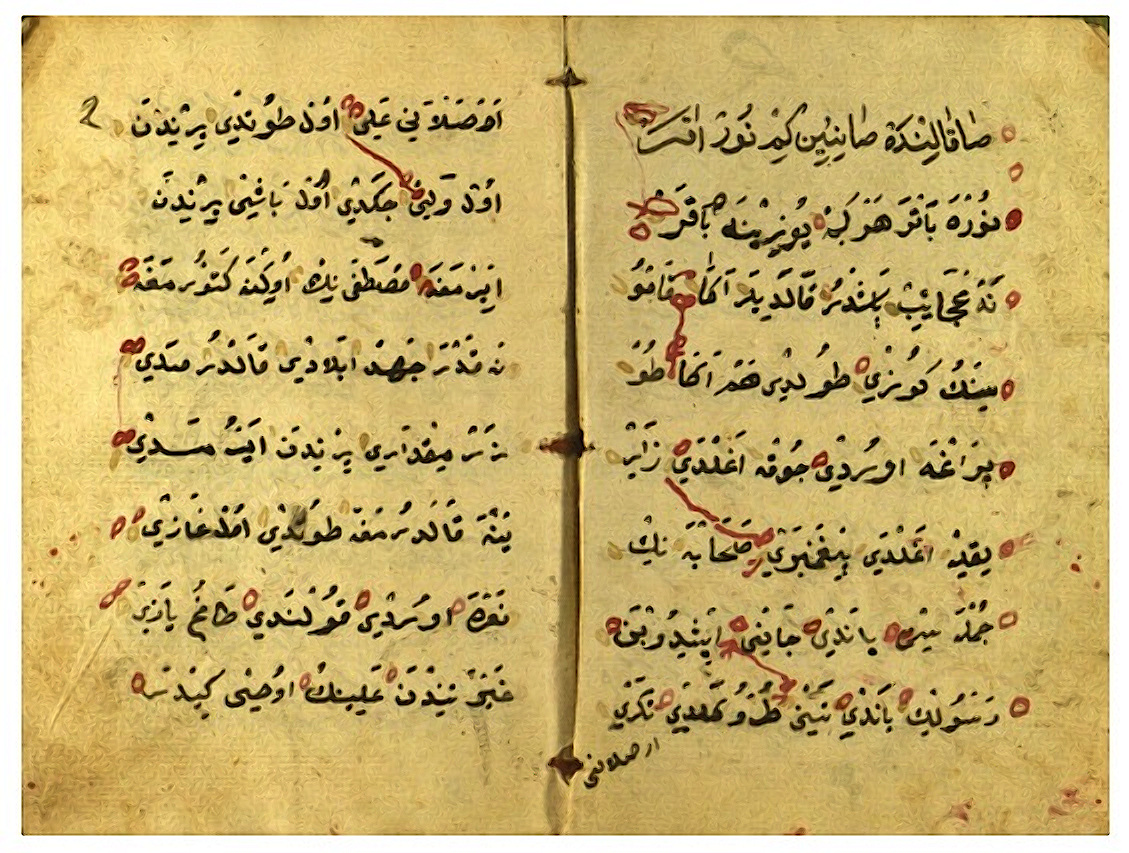
Folio from Ms. 06 Hk 3953/1. Stored in the National Library in Ankara

Kesik Baş is a mes̱nevī written in Old Anatolian Turkish. It tells the story of how Ali (the cousin, son-in-law and companion of the Islamic prophet Muhammad) battled against a giant so that the severed head of a devout Muslim would regain his body and thereby would be able to rescue his dear ones. The work spread in Anatolia in the Middle Ages, and it is generally attributed to Kirdeci Ali. The work is part of an array of works that were originally transmitted orally being read out in gatherings or during religious celebrations.

The work was first brought to awareness of scholars by Mehmet Fuat Köprülü in 1918.

The text is written in a register of spoken vernacular Turkish, marked by a limited and mostly Turkish vocabulary, except for words belonging to the world of religion, which are of Arabic origin. It also contains a large number of verbs and many instances of direct speech. It infrequently uses Persian syntactic constructs.

== Copies ==
Noteworthy copies of the work include:

- N. Y-462 of the Türk Tarih Kurumu’s Library datable to 1732–3
- A 3881 in the National Library of Ankara
- A copy printed in Istanbul in 1893 and included in the book entitled Hikāye- i Mevlidü’n Nebī
- No. 1344 in the Üsküp Gazi Hüsrev Bey Library dated to 1618
- Ms. 06 Hk 3953/1 located in the National Library in Ankara. The manuscript is undated, but may be dated to the 17th-18th century

== Sources ==
- Cazzato, Irene (2022). "The Kesik Baş: Some Remarks on a Medieval Turkish Legend". Eurasian Studies. 19 (2): 237–265. doi:10.1163/24685623-12340116.
