= Azerbaijani language =

Turkic language

Azerbaijani
- Azeri; Azerbaijani Turkic; Azerbaijani Turkish
- Azərbaycan dili; آذربایجان دیلی; Азәрбајҹан дили (Note: Former Cyrillic spelling used in the Azerbaijan Soviet Socialist Republic.)
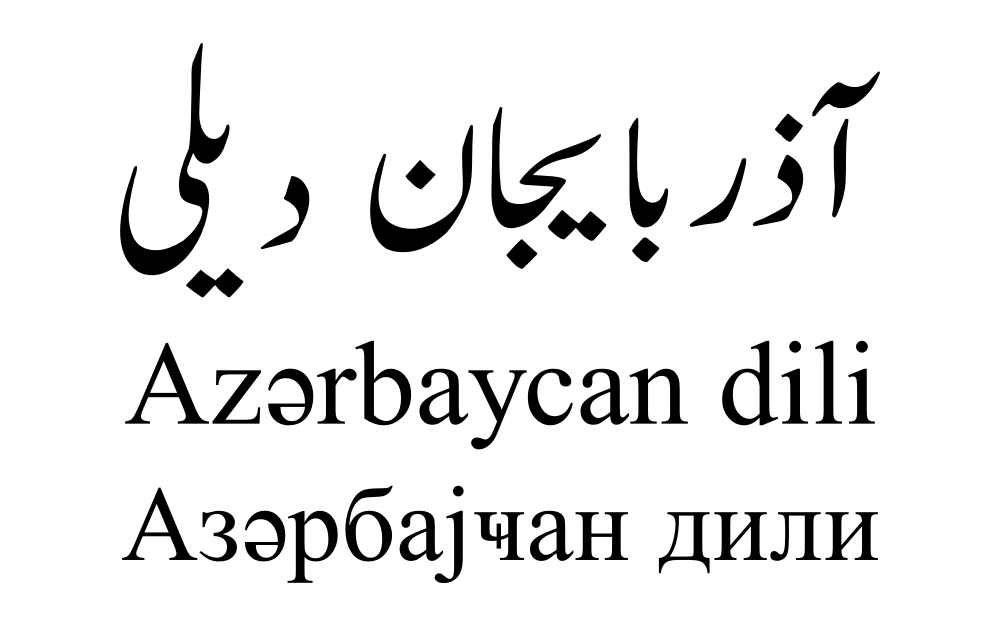
- Azerbaijani in Perso-Arabic Nastaliq (Iran), Latin (Azerbaijan), and Cyrillic (Russia).
- Pronunciation: [ɑːzæɾbɑjˈdʒɑn dɪˈli]
- Native to: Iran; Azerbaijan; Russia; Turkey; Iraq (Note: The written language of the Iraqi Turkmen is based on Istanbul Turkish using the modern Turkish alphabet.; Professor Christiane Bulut has argued that publications from Azerbaijan often use expressions such as "Azerbaijani (dialects) of Iraq" or "South Azerbaijani" to describe Iraqi Turkmen dialects "with political implications"; however, in Turcological literature, closely related dialects in Turkey and Iraq are generally referred to as "eastern Anatolian" or "Iraq-Turkic/-Turkman" dialects, respectively.); Georgia
- Region: Iranian Azerbaijan, South Caucasus
- Ethnicity: Azerbaijanis
- Native speakers: 24 million (2022)
- Language family: Turkic: Common Turkic; Oghuz; Central Oghuz/ Western Oghuz; Azerbaijani
- Early forms: Old Anatolian Turkish: Ajem-Turkic
- Standard forms: Shirvani (For North Azerbaijani variety in Republic of Azerbaijan); Tabrizi (For South Azerbaijani variety in Iranian Azerbaijan)
- Dialects: Various
- Writing system: In Azerbaijan: Latin script (Azerbaijani Latin alphabet); In Iran: Perso-Arabic script (Azerbaijani Arabic alphabet); In Russia: Cyrillic script

Official status
- Official language in: Azerbaijan; Dagestan (Russia); Organization of Turkic States
- Regulated by: Azerbaijan National Academy of Sciences (North Azerbaijani); No regulatory body (South Azerbaijani)

Language codes
- ISO 639-1: az
- ISO 639-2: aze
- ISO 639-3: aze – inclusive code Individual codes: azj – North Azerbaijani azb – South Azerbaijani
- Glottolog: azer1255 Central Oghuz
- Linguasphere: part of 44-AAB-a
- Areas that speak Azerbaijani The majority speaks Azerbaijani A sizable minority speaks Azerbaijani

Azerbaijani (Note: /ˌæzərbaɪˈdʒæni, -ɑːn-/ AZ-ər-by-JA(H)N-ee: آذربایجانجا; Azərbaycanca; Азәрбајҹанҹа) or Azeri (Note: /æˈzɛəri, ɑːˈ-, əˈ-/ a(h)-ZAIR-ee, ə-) (also referred to as Azerbaijani Turkic or Azerbaijani Turkish (Note: Azərbaycan türkcəsi; آذربایجان تۆرکچه‌سی; Азәрбајҹан түркҹәси)) is a Turkic language from the Oghuz sub-branch. It is spoken primarily by the Azerbaijani people, who are native to the Azerbaijan region of Iran, as well as the Republic of Azerbaijan. The Iranian Azerbaijanis speak South Azerbaijani, while the ones in the Republic speak North Azerbaijani; but it is unclear whether these two varieties form one language, as the International Organization for Standardization (ISO) considers Northern and Southern Azerbaijani to be distinct languages.

Azerbaijani is the only official language in the Republic of Azerbaijan and one of the 14 official languages of Dagestan (a federal subject of Russia), but it does not have official status in Iran, where the majority of Iranian Azerbaijani people live. Azerbaijani is also spoken to lesser varying degrees in Azerbaijani communities of Georgia and Turkey and by diaspora communities, primarily in Europe and North America.

Although there is a high degree of mutual intelligibility between both forms of Azerbaijani, there are significant differences in phonology, lexicon, morphology, syntax, and sources of loanwords. The standardized form of North Azerbaijani (spoken in the Republic of Azerbaijan and Russia) is based on the Shirvani dialect, while South Azerbaijani uses a variety of regional dialects. Since the Republic of Azerbaijan's independence from the Soviet Union in 1991, Northern Azerbaijani has used the Latin script. On the other hand, South Azerbaijani has always used and continues to use the Perso-Arabic script.

Azerbaijani is closely related to Turkmen, Turkish, Gagauz, and Qashqai, being mutually intelligible with each of these languages to varying degrees.

== Etymology and background ==
Historically, the language was referred to by its native speakers as türk dili or türkcə, meaning either "Turkish" or "Turkic". In the early years following the establishment of the Azerbaijan Soviet Socialist Republic, the language was still referred to as "Turkic" in official documents. However, in the 1930s, its name was officially changed to "Azerbaijani". The language is often still referred to as Turki or Torki (Turkish or Turkic) in Iranian Azerbaijan. The term "Azeri", generally interchangeable with "Azerbaijani", is from Turkish Azeri. The 17th century Capuchin missionary Raphael du Mans used the expression "Turk Ajami" in relation to the Azerbaijani language. This term is used by many modern authors to designate the direct historical predecessor of the modern Azerbaijani language (see Middle Azerbaijani language). The term is derived from earlier designations, such as lingua turcica agemica, or Turc Agemi, which was used in a grammar book composed by the French writer Capuchin Raphaël du Mans (died 1696) in 1684. Local texts simply called the language türkī. During "the Isfahan phase of the Safavids", it was called ḳızılbaşī in contrast to rūmī (Ottoman) and çaġatā’ī (Chagatai), due to its close relation to dialects spoken by the Qizilbash. Azerbaijani or Azeri is the term that is used interchangeably for the language throughout the 19th and 20th centuries.

== History and evolution ==
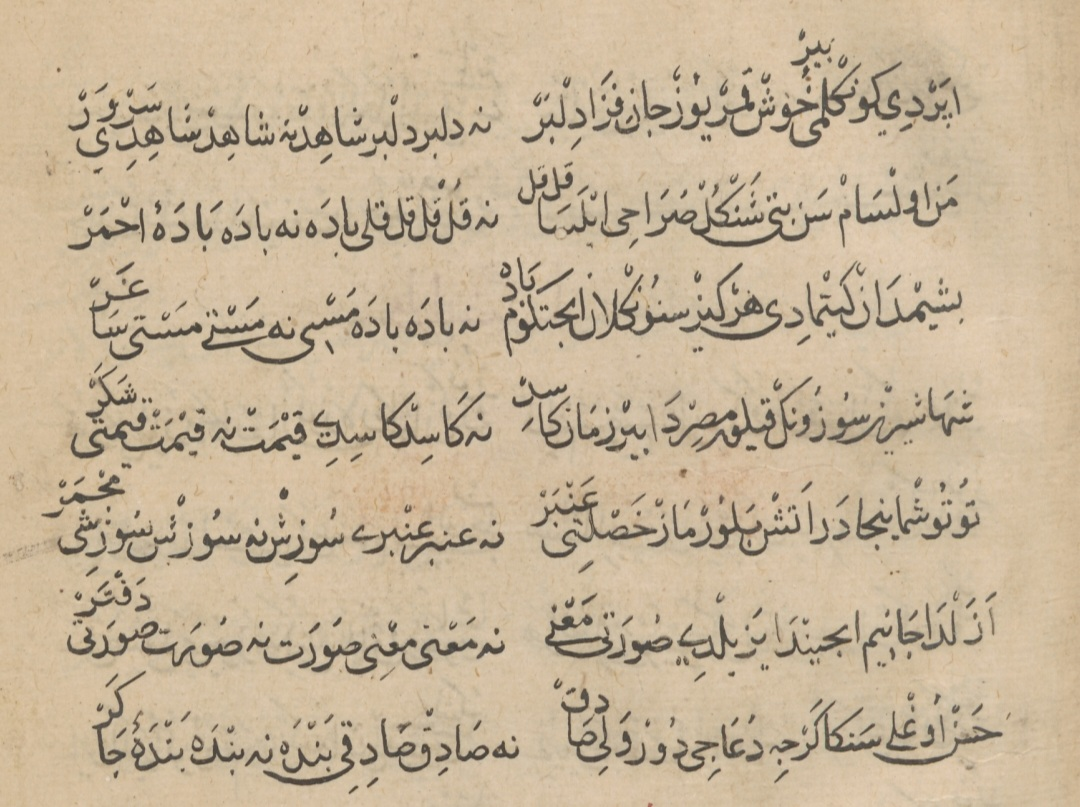
Ghazal commonly called "Apardı Könlümü" by Izzeddin Hasanoghlu which is considered the earliest known piece of literature in Azerbaijani Turkish by modern researchers, from the anthology Kitab-i Gulistan bil-Turki compiled by Seyfi Sarayi, published in 1391 and kept in the library of Leiden University

Azerbaijani evolved from the Eastern branch of Oghuz Turkic ("Western Turkic") which spread to the Caucasus in Eastern Europe and northern Iran in West Asia during the medieval Turkic migrations. Persian and Arabic influenced the language, but Arabic words were mainly transmitted through the intermediary of literary Persian. Azerbaijani is, perhaps after Uzbek, the Turkic language upon which Persian and other Iranian languages have exerted the strongest impact—mainly in phonology, syntax, and vocabulary, less in morphology.

During the period of the Qara Qoyunlu and Aq Qoyunlu states, Azerbaijani Turkic (in the sources of that period, "Turki") gradually began to emerge as a means of literary and poetic expression.

During this period, writing in Turkic became fashionable in the court and among poets. The ruler of the Qara Qoyunlu, Jahanshah, was known by his pen name "Haqiqi", and the ruler of the Aq Qoyunlu, Sultan Yaqub, was known for writing poems in Turkic.

The Sufi poet Qasim-i Anvar also used Turkic as a literary language and wrote poetry in this language.

The Turkic language of Azerbaijan gradually supplanted the Iranian languages in what is now northwestern Iran, and a variety of languages of the Caucasus and Iranian languages spoken in the Caucasus, particularly Udi and Old Azeri. By the beginning of the 16th century, it had become the dominant language of the region. It was one of the spoken languages in the court of the Safavids and Qajars.

The historical development of Azerbaijani can be divided into two major periods: early (c. 14th to 18th century) and modern (18th century to present). Early Azerbaijani differs from its descendant in that it contained a much larger number of Persian and Arabic loanwords, phrases and syntactic elements. Early writings in Azerbaijani also demonstrate linguistic interchangeability between Oghuz and Kypchak elements in many aspects (such as pronouns, case endings, participles, etc.). As Azerbaijani gradually moved from being merely a language of epic and lyric poetry to being also a language of journalism and scientific research, its literary version has become more or less unified and simplified with the loss of many archaic Turkic elements, stilted Iranisms and Ottomanisms, and other words, expressions, and rules that failed to gain popularity among the Azerbaijani masses.

The Russian annexation of Iran's territories in the Caucasus through the Russo-Iranian wars of 1804–1813 and 1826–1828 split the language community across two states. Afterwards, the Tsarist administration encouraged the spread of Azerbaijani in eastern Transcaucasia as a replacement for Persian spoken by the upper classes, and as a measure against Persian influence in the region.

Between c. 1900 and 1930, there were several competing approaches to the unification of the national language in what is now the Azerbaijan Republic, popularized by scholars such as Hasan bey Zardabi and Mammad agha Shahtakhtinski. Despite major differences, they all aimed primarily at making it easy for semi-literate masses to read and understand literature. They all criticized the overuse of Persian, Arabic, and European elements in both colloquial and literary language and called for a simpler and more popular style.

The Soviet Union promoted the development of the language but set it back considerably with two successive script changes – from the Persian to Latin and then to the Cyrillic script – while Iranian Azerbaijanis continued to use the Persian script as they always had. Despite the wide use of Azerbaijani in the Azerbaijan Soviet Socialist Republic, it became the official language of Azerbaijan only in 1956. After independence, the Republic of Azerbaijan decided to switch back to a modified Latin script.

== Azerbaijani literature ==
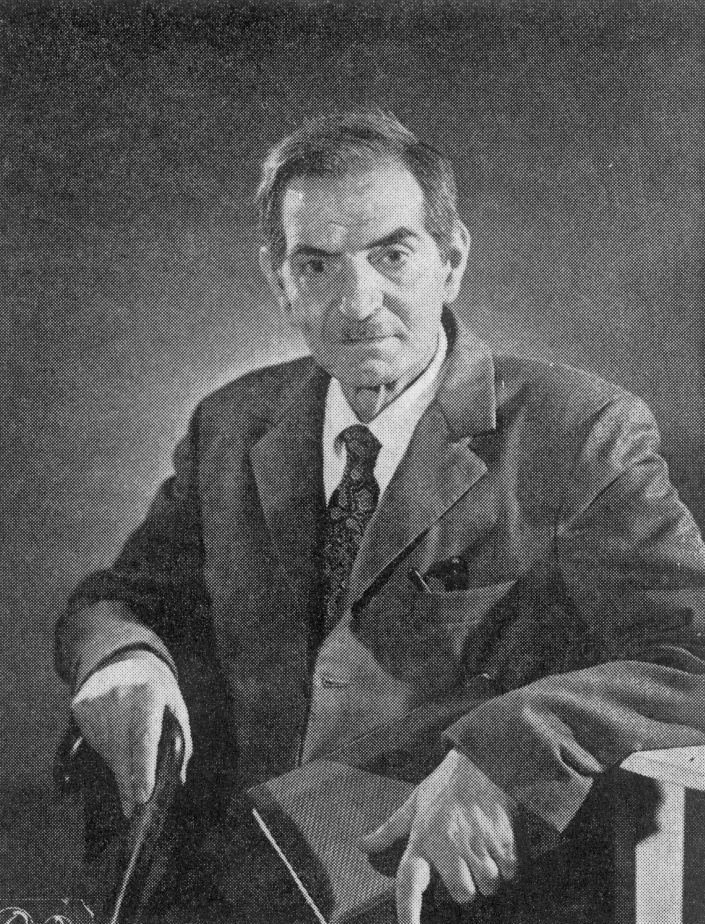
Mohammad-Hossein Shahriar, Iranian Azerbaijani poet, who wrote in Azerbaijani and Persian.

The development of Azerbaijani literature is closely associated with Anatolian Turkish, written in Perso-Arabic script. Examples of its detachment date to the 14th century or earlier. Kadi Burhan al-Din, Hasanoghlu, and Imadaddin Nasimi helped to establish Azerbaiijani as a literary language in the 14th century through poetry and other works. One ruler of the Qara Qoyunlu state, Jahanshah, wrote poems in Azerbaijani language under the pen name "Haqiqi". Sultan Yaqub, a ruler of the Aq Qoyunlu state, wrote poems in the Azerbaijani language. The ruler and poet Ismail I wrote under the pen name Khatā'ī (which means "sinner" in Persian) during the fifteenth century. During the 16th century, the poet, writer and thinker Fuzûlî wrote mainly in Azerbaijani but also translated his poems into Arabic and Persian.

Starting in the 1830s, several newspapers were published in Iran during the reign of the Qajar dynasty, but it is unknown whether any of these newspapers were written in Azerbaijani. In 1875, Akinchi (Əkinçi / اکينچی) ("The Ploughman") became the first Azerbaijani newspaper to be published in the Russian Empire. It was started by Hasan bey Zardabi, a journalist and education advocate.

Mohammad-Hossein Shahriar is an important figure in Azerbaijani poetry. His most important work is Heydar Babaya Salam and it is considered to be a pinnacle of Azerbaijani literature and gained popularity in the Turkic-speaking world. It was translated into more than 30 languages.

In the mid-19th century, Azerbaijani literature was taught at schools in Baku, Ganja, Shaki, Tbilisi, and Yerevan. Since 1845, it has also been taught in the Saint Petersburg State University in Russia. In 2018, Azerbaijani language and literature programs are offered in the United States at several universities, including Indiana University, UCLA, and University of Texas at Austin. The vast majority, if not all Azerbaijani language courses teach North Azerbaijani written in the Latin script and not South Azerbaijani written in the Perso-Arabic script.

Modern literature in the Republic of Azerbaijan is primarily based on the Shirvani dialect, while in the Iranian Azerbaijan region (historic Azerbaijan) it is based on the Tabrizi one.

== Lingua franca ==
Azerbaijani served as a koiné language throughout most parts of the South Caucasus and in southern Dagestan, and all over Iran from the 16th to the early 20th centuries, alongside cultural, administrative, court literature, and most importantly official language of all these regions, New Persian.

From the early 16th century up to the course of the 19th century, Safavid, Afsharid, Zand, and Qajar states of Iran ruled these regions and territories until the Russian conquest of the Caucasus lead to Qajar Iran ceded Transcaucasia and Dagestan to the Russian Empire in the 1813 Treaty of Gulistan and the 1828 Treaty of Turkmenchay. In the 1829 Caucasus School Statute, Russia established the teaching of Azerbaijani (Tatar) in all district schools of Ganja, Shusha, Nukha (now Shaki), Shamakhi, Quba, Baku, Derbent, Yerevan, Nakhchivan, Akhaltsikhe, and Lankaran.

== Dialects ==
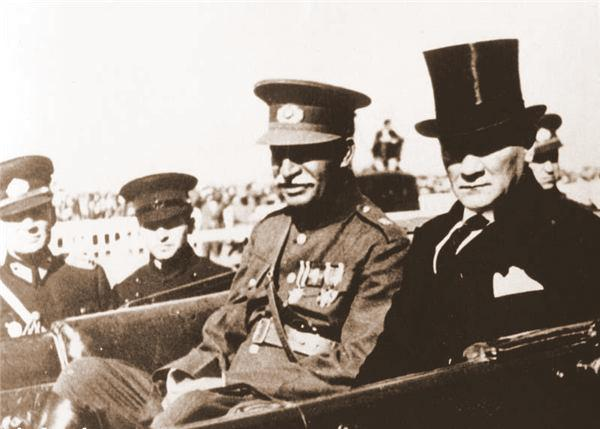
Reza Shah and Kemal Atatürk during the Shah's official visit to Turkey in 1934. Reza Shah spoke in South Azerbaijani while Atatürk spoke in Turkish, and the two leaders managed to communicate with each other quite effectively.

Azerbaijani is one of the Oghuz languages within the Turkic language family. Ethnologue lists North Azerbaijani (spoken mainly in the Republic of Azerbaijan and Russia) and South Azerbaijani (spoken in Iran, Iraq, and Syria) as two groups within the Azerbaijani macrolanguage with "significant differences in phonology, lexicon, morphology, syntax, and loanwords" between the two. The International Organization for Standardization (ISO) considers Northern and Southern Azerbaijani to be distinct languages. Linguists Mohammad Salehi and Aydin Neysani write that "there is a high degree of mutual intelligibility" between North and South Azerbaijani.

Svante Cornell wrote in his 2001 book Small Nations and Great Powers that "it is certain that Russian and Iranian words (sic), respectively, have entered the vocabulary on either side of the Araxes river, but this has not occurred to an extent that it could pose difficulties for communication". There are numerous dialects, with 21 North Azerbaijani dialects and 11 South Azerbaijani dialects identified by Ethnologue.

Three varieties have been accorded ISO 639-3 language codes: North Azerbaijani, South Azerbaijani and Qashqai. The Glottolog 4.1 database classifies North Azerbaijani, with 20 dialects, and South Azerbaijani, with 13 dialects, under the Modern Azeric family, a branch of Central Oghuz.

In the northern dialects of the Azerbaijani language, linguists find traces of the influence of the Khazar language.

According to Encyclopedia Iranica:

We may distinguish the following Azeri dialects: (1) eastern group: Derbent (Darband), Kuba, Shemakha (Šamāḵī), Baku, Salyani (Salyānī), and Lenkoran (Lankarān), (2) western group: Kazakh (not to be confounded with the Kipchak-Turkic language of the same name), the dialect of the Ayrïm (Āyrom) tribe (which, however, resembles Turkish), and the dialect spoken in the region of the Borchala river; (3) northern group: Zakataly, Nukha, and Kutkashen; (4) southern group: Yerevan (Īravān), Nakhichevan (Naḵjavān), and Ordubad (Ordūbād); (5) central group: Ganja (Kirovabad) and Shusha; (6) North Iraqi dialects; (7) Northwest Iranian dialects: Tabrīz, Reżāʾīya (Urmia), etc., extended east to about Qazvīn; (8) Southeast Caspian dialect (Galūgāh). Optionally, we may adjoin as Azeri (or "Azeroid") dialects: (9) East Anatolian, (10) Qašqāʾī, (11) Aynallū, (12) Sonqorī, (13) dialects south of Qom, (14) Kabul Afšārī.

=== North Azerbaijani ===
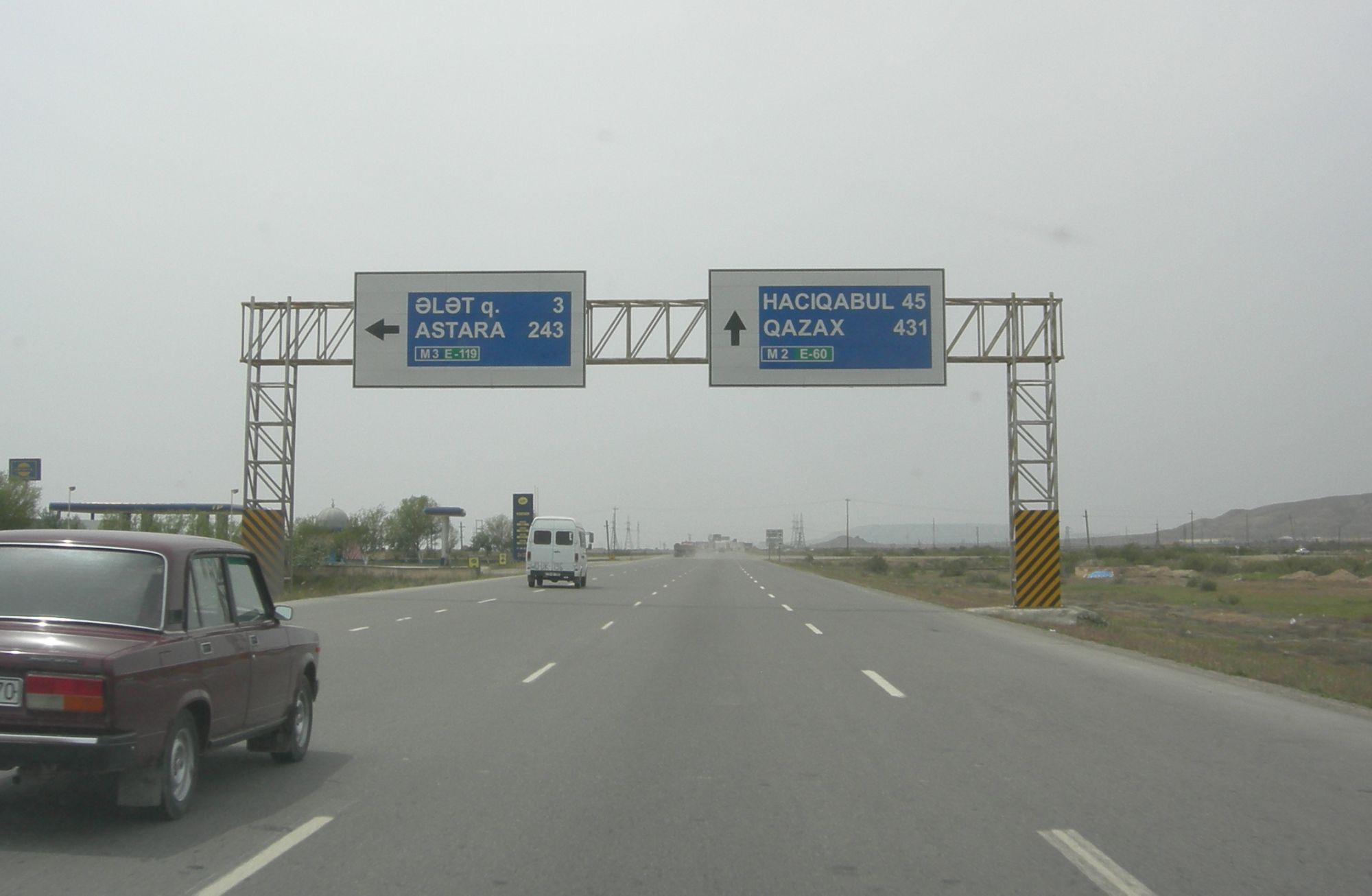
Azerbaijani-language road sign.

North Azerbaijani, or Northern Azerbaijani, is the official language of the Republic of Azerbaijan. It is closely related to modern-day Istanbul Turkish, the official language of Turkey. It is also spoken in southern Dagestan, along the Caspian coast in the southern Caucasus Mountains and in scattered regions throughout Central Asia. As of 2011, there are some 9.23 million speakers of North Azerbaijani including 4 million monolingual speakers (many North Azerbaijani speakers also speak Russian, as is common throughout former USSR countries).

The Shirvan dialect as spoken in Baku is the basis of standard Azerbaijani. Since 1992, it has been officially written with a Latin script in the Republic of Azerbaijan, but the older Cyrillic script was still widely used in the late 1990s.

Ethnologue lists 21 North Azerbaijani dialects: "Quba, Derbend, Baku, Shamakhi, Salyan, Lenkaran, Qazakh, Airym, Borcala, Nukha, Zaqatala (Mugaly), Qabala, Nakhchivan, Ordubad, Ganja, Shusha (Karabakh), Kutkashen, Kuba", and Karapapakh (often considered a separate language. The second edition of the Encyclopaedia of Islam mentions that it is close to both "Āzerī and the Turkish of Turkey". The historian George Bournoutian only mentions that it is close to present-day Azeri-Türki.).

=== South Azerbaijani ===
South Azerbaijani, or Iranian Azerbaijani, (Note: Since Azerbaijan's independence from the Soviet Union in 1991, northern Azerbaijani uses the Latin alphabet. Iranian Azerbaijani, on the other hand, has always used and continues to use Arabic script.) is widely spoken in Iranian Azerbaijan and, to a lesser extent, in neighboring regions of Turkey and Iraq, with smaller communities in Syria. In Iran, the Persian word for Azerbaijani is borrowed as Torki "Turkic". In Iran, it is spoken mainly in East Azerbaijan, West Azerbaijan, Ardabil and Zanjan. It is also spoken in Tehran and across the Tehran Province, as Azerbaijanis form by far the largest minority in the city and the wider province, comprising about 1/6 of its total population. The CIA World Factbook reports that in 2010, the percentage of Iranian Azerbaijani speakers was at around 16 percent of the Iranian population, or approximately 13 million people worldwide, and ethnic Azeris form by far the second largest ethnic group of Iran, thus making the language also the second most spoken language in the nation. Ethnologue reports 10.9 million Azerbaijani-speakers in Iran in 2016 and 13,823,350 worldwide.

Dialects of South Azerbaijani include:

- Aynallu (often considered a separate language)
- Karapapakh (often considered a separate language. The second edition of the Encyclopaedia of Islam mentions that it is close to both "Āzerī and the Turkish of Turkey". The historian George Bournoutian only mentions that it is close to present-day Azeri-Türki.)
- Afshari (often considered a separate language)
- Shahsavani (sometimes considered its own dialect, distinct from other Turkic languages of northwestern Iran)
- Baharlu (Kamesh)
- Moqaddam
- Nafar
- Qaragozlu
- Pishagchi
- Bayat
- Qajar
- Tabriz

== Classification ==
Russian comparatist Oleg Mudrak calls the Turkmen language the closest relative of Azerbaijani.

=== Azerbaijani and Turkish ===
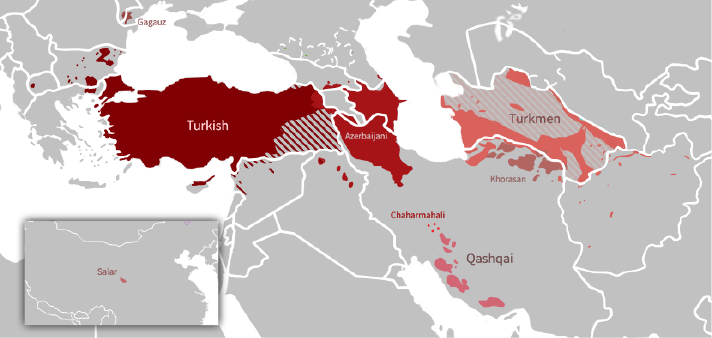
Turkish, Azerbaijani, and Turkmen are Oghuz languages

Speakers of Turkish and Azerbaijani can, to an extent, communicate with each other as both languages have substantial similarity. However, it is easier for many Azerbaijani speakers to understand Turkish than it is for Turkish speakers to understand Azerbaijani. Turkish soap operas are very popular with Azeris in both Iran and Azerbaijan. Reza Shah Pahlavi of Iran (who spoke South Azerbaijani) met with Mustafa Kemal Atatürk of Turkey (who spoke Turkish) in 1934; the two were filmed speaking their respective languages to each other and communicated effectively.

In a 2011 study, 30 Turkish participants were tested to determine how well they understood written and spoken Azerbaijani. It was found that even though Turkish and Azerbaijani are typologically similar languages, on the part of Turkish speakers the intelligibility is not as high as is estimated. In a 2017 study, Iranian Azerbaijanis scored in average 56% of receptive intelligibility in spoken Turkish.

Azerbaijani exhibits a similar stress pattern to Turkish but simpler in some respects. Azerbaijani is a strongly stressed and partially stress-timed language, unlike Turkish which is weakly stressed and syllable-timed.

Below are some cognates with different spelling in Azerbaijani and Turkish:

Azerbaijani	Turkish	English
ayaqqabı	ayakkabı	shoes
ayaq	ayak	foot
kitab	kitap	book
qan	kan	blood
qaz	kaz	goose
qaş	kaş	eyebrow
qar	kar	snow
daş	taş	stone

=== Azerbaijani and Turkmen ===
The 1st person personal pronoun is mən in Azerbaijani just as men in Turkmen, whereas it is ben in Turkish. The same is true for demonstrative pronouns bu, where sound b is replaced with sound m. For example: bunun>munun/mının, muna/mına, munu/munı, munda/mında, mundan/mından. This is observed in the Turkmen literary language as well, where the demonstrative pronoun bu undergoes some changes just as in: munuñ, munı, muña, munda, mundan, munça. b>m replacement is encountered in many dialects of the Turkmen language and may be observed in such words as: boyun>moyın in Yomut – Gunbatar dialect, büdüremek>müdüremek in Ersari and Stavropol Turkmens' dialects, bol>mol in Karakalpak Turkmens' dialects, buzav>mizov in Kirac dialects.

Here are some words from the Swadesh list to compare Azerbaijani with Turkmen:

Azerbaijani	Turkmen	English
mən	men	I, me
sən	sen	you
haçan	haçan	when
başqa	başga	other
it, köpək	it, köpek	dog
dəri	deri	skin, leather
yumurta	ýumurtga	egg
ürək	ýürek	heart
eşitmək	eşitmek	to hear

=== Oghuric ===
Azerbaijani dialects share paradigms of verbs in some tenses with the Chuvash language, on which linguists also rely in the study and reconstruction of the Khazar language.

== Phonology ==
=== Phonotactics ===
Azerbaijani phonotactics is similar to that of other Oghuz Turkic languages, except:

- Trimoraic syllables with long vowels are permissible.
- There is an ongoing metathesis of neighboring consonants in a word. Speakers tend to reorder consonants in the order of decreasing sonority and back-to-front (for example, iləri becomes irəli, köprü becomes körpü, topraq becomes torpaq). Some of the metatheses are so common in the educated speech that they are reflected in orthography (all the above examples are like that). This phenomenon is more common in rural dialects but observed even in educated young urban speakers, but noticeably absent from some Southern dialects.
- Intramorpheme q /g/ becomes /x/.

=== Consonants ===
Consonant phonemes of Standard Azerbaijani
	Labial		Dental/ Alveolar		Palato- alveolar		Palatal		Velar		Glottal
Nasal		m		n						(ŋ)	
Stop/Affricate	p	b	t	d	t͡ʃ	d͡ʒ	c	ɟ	(k)	ɡ	
Fricative	f	v	s	z	ʃ	ʒ			x	ɣ	h
Approximant				l				j			
Flap				ɾ							

1. Outside Iran, the sound [k] is used only in loanwords; the historical unpalatalized [k] became voiced to [ɡ], and was only preserved in Iran.
2. /t͡ʃ/ and /d͡ʒ/ are realised as [t͡s] and [d͡z] respectively in the areas around Tabriz and to the west, south and southwest of Tabriz (including Kirkuk in Iraq); in the Nakhchivan and Ayrum dialects, in Cəbrayil and some Caspian coastal dialects;.
3. Sounds /t͡s/ and /d͡z/ may also be recognized as separate phonemic sounds in the Tabrizi and southern dialects.
4. In most dialects of Azerbaijani, /c/ is realized as [ç] when it is found in the syllabic coda or is preceded by a voiceless consonant (as in çörək [t͡ʃœˈɾæç] 'bread'; səksən [sæçˈsæn] 'eighty').
5. /w/ exists in the Kirkuk dialect as an allophone of /v/ in Arabic loanwords.
6. In colloquial speech, /x/ (but not intramorpheme [x] transformed from /g/) is usually pronounced as [χ]

==== Dialectal consonants ====
Works on Azerbaijani dialectology use the following notations for dialectal consonants:

- Ⱪ ⱪ—[k]
- X' x'—[ç]
- Ŋ ŋ—[ŋ]
- Ц ц—[t͡s]
- Dz dz—[d͡z]
- Ž ž—[ð]
- W w—[w, ɥ]

Examples:

- [k]—ⱪış [kɯʃ]
- [ç]—üzüx' [ʔyˈzyç]
- [ŋ]—ataŋın [ʔɑt̪ɑŋˈɯn̪]
- [t͡s]—цay [t͡sɑj]
- [d͡z]—dzan [d͡zɑn̪]
- [ð]—əžəli [ʔæðæˈl̪ɪ]
- [w]—dowşan [d̪ɔːwˈʃɑn̪]
- [ɥ]—töwlə [t̪œːɥˈl̪æ]

=== Vowels ===
The vowels of the Azerbaijani are, in alphabetical order, a /ɑ/, e /e/, ə /æ/, ı /ɯ/, i /i/, o /o/, ö /œ/, u /u/, ü /y/.

South Azerbaijani vowel chart, from Mokari & Werner (2016:509)

Vowels of Standard Azerbaijani
	Front		Back	
	Unrounded	Rounded	Unrounded	Rounded
Close	i	y	ɯ	u
Mid	e	œ		o
Open	æ		ɑ	

The typical phonetic quality of South Azerbaijani vowels is as follows:

- /i, u, æ/ are close to cardinal [i, u, a].
- The F1 and F2 formant frequencies overlap for /œ/ and /ɯ/. Their acoustic quality is more or less close-mid central [ɵ, ə]. The main role in the distinction of two vowels is played by the different F3 frequencies in audition, and rounding in articulation. Phonologically, however, they are more distinct: /œ/ is phonologically a mid front rounded vowel [ø̞], the front counterpart of /o/ and the rounded counterpart of /e/. /ɯ/ is phonologically a close back unrounded vowel [ɯ], the back counterpart of /i/ and the unrounded counterpart of /u/.
- The other mid vowels /e, o/ are closer to close-mid [e, o] than open-mid [ɛ, ɔ].
- /ɑ/ is phonetically near-open back [ɑ̝].

==== Diphthongs ====
The modern Azerbaijani Latin alphabet contains the digraphs ov and öv to represent diphthongs present in the language, and the pronunciation of diphthongs is today accepted as the norm in the orthophony of Azerbaijani. Despite this, the number and even the existence of diphthongs in Azerbaijani has been disputed, with some linguists, such as Abdulazal Damirchizade, arguing that they are non-phonemic. Damirchizade's view was challenged by others, such as Aghamusa Akhundov, who argued that Damirchizade was taking orthography as the basis of his judgement, rather than its phonetic value. According to Akhundov, Azerbaijani contains two diphthongs, /ou̯/ and /œy̯/, (Note: They are /oʋ/ and /œw/ in the dialect of Tabriz.) represented by ov and öv in the alphabet, both of which are phonemic due to their contrast with /o/ and /œ/, represented by o and ö. In some cases, a non-syllabic /v/ can also be pronounced after the aforementioned diphthongs, to form /ou̯v/ and /œy̯v/, the rules of which are as follows:

- If the letter o precedes v and then u, forming ovu, it should be pronounced as /ou̯/, e.g. sovurmaq, pronounced [sou̯rˈmɑx].
- If the letter o precedes v and then any consonant, it should be pronounced as /ou̯(v)/, with the pronunciation of the v being optional, e.g. dovşan, pronounced [dou̯(v)ˈʃɑn].
- If the letter ö precedes v and then any unvoiced consonant, it should be pronounced as /œy̯/, e.g. cövhər, pronounced [d͡ʒœy̯ˈhær].
- If the letter ö precedes v and then any voiced consonant, it should be pronounced as /œy̯(v)/, with the pronunciation of the v being optional, e.g. tövbə, pronounced [tœy̯(v)ˈbæ].

Modern linguists who have examined Azerbaijani's vowel system almost unanimously have recognised that diphthongs are phonetically produced in speech.

== Writing systems ==
Before 1929, Azerbaijani was written only in the Perso-Arabic alphabet, an impure abjad that does not represent all vowels (without diacritical marks). In Iran, the process of standardization of orthography started with the publication of Azerbaijani magazines and newspapers such as Varlıq (وارلیق 'Existence') from 1979. Azerbaijani-speaking scholars and literarians showed great interest in involvement in such ventures and in working towards the development of a standard writing system. These efforts culminated in language seminars being held in Tehran, chaired by the founder of Varlıq, Javad Heyat, in 2001 where a document outlining the standard orthography and writing conventions were published for the public. This standard of writing is today canonized by a Persian–Azeri Turkic dictionary in Iran titled Loghatnāme-ye Torki-ye Āzarbāyjāni.

Between 1929 and 1938, a Latin alphabet was in use for North Azerbaijani, although it was different from the one used now. From 1938 to 1991, the Cyrillic script was used. Lastly, in 1991, the current Latin alphabet was introduced, although the transition to it has been rather slow. For instance, until an Aliyev decree on the matter in 2001, newspapers would routinely write headlines in the Latin script, leaving the stories in Cyrillic. The transition has also resulted in some misrendering of İ as Ì. In Dagestan, Azerbaijani is still written in Cyrillic script.

The Azerbaijani Latin alphabet is based on the Turkish Latin alphabet. In turn, the Turkish Latin alphabet was based on a former Azerbaijani Latin alphabet because of their linguistic connections and mutual intelligibility. The letters Әə, Xx, and Qq are available only in Azerbaijani for sounds which do not exist as separate phonemes in Turkish.

Old Latin (1929–1938 version; no longer in use; replaced by 1991 version)	Official Latin (Azerbaijan since 1991)	Cyrillic (1958 version, still official in Dagestan)	Perso-Arabic (Iran; Azerbaijan until 1929)	IPA
A a		А а	آ / ـا	/ɑ/
B в	B b	Б б	ب	/b/
Ç ç	C c	Ҹ ҹ	ج	/dʒ/
C c	Ç ç	Ч ч	چ	/tʃ/
D d		Д д	د	/d/
E e		Е е	ئ	/e/
Ə ə		Ә ә	ا / َ / ە	/æ/
F f		Ф ф	ف	/f/
G g		Ҝ ҝ	گ	/ɟ/
Ƣ ƣ	Ğ ğ	Ғ ғ	غ	/ɣ/
H h		Һ һ	ح / ه	/h/
X x		Х х	خ	/x/
Ь ь	I ı	Ы ы	ؽ	/ɯ/
I i	İ i	И и	ی	/i/
Ƶ ƶ	J j	Ж ж	ژ	/ʒ/
K k		К к	ک	/k/, /c/
Q q		Г г	ق	/ɡ/
L l		Л л	ل	/l/
M m		М м	م	/m/
N n		Н н	ن	/n/
Ꞑ ꞑ (Note: Excluded from the alphabet in 1938)	–	–	ݣ / نگ	/ŋ/
O o		О о	وْ	/o/
Ɵ ɵ	Ö ö	Ө ө	ؤ	/œ/
P p		П п	پ	/p/
R r		Р р	ر	/r/
S s		С с	ث / س / ص	/s/
Ş ş		Ш ш	ش	/ʃ/
T t		Т т	ت / ط	/t/
U u		У у	ۇ	/u/
Y y	Ü ü	Ү ү	ۆ	/y/
V v		В в	و	/v/
J j	Y y	Ј ј	ی	/j/
Z z		З з	ذ / ز / ض / ظ	/z/
–		ʼ	ع	/ʔ/

Northern Azerbaijani, unlike Turkish, respells foreign names to conform with Latin Azerbaijani spelling, e.g. Bush is spelled Buş and Schröder becomes Şröder. Hyphenation across lines directly corresponds to spoken syllables, except for geminated consonants which are hyphenated as two separate consonants since morphonology considers them two separate consonants back-to-back but enunciated in the onset of the latter syllable as a single long consonant, as in other Turkic languages.

== Vocabulary ==
=== Interjections ===
Some samples include:

Secular:

- Of ("Ugh!")
- Tez Ol ("Be quick!")

Invoking deity:

- implicitly:
  - Aman ("Mercy")
  - Çox şükür ("Much thanks")
- explicitly:
  - Allah Allah (pronounced as Allahallah) ("Goodness gracious")
  - Hay Allah; Vallah "By God [I swear it]".
  - Çox şükür Allahım ("Much thanks my God")

=== Formal and informal ===
Azerbaijani has informal and formal ways of saying things. This is because there is a strong T–V distinction in Turkic languages like Azerbaijani and Turkish (as well as in many other languages). The informal "you" is used when talking to close friends, relatives, animals or children. The formal "you" is used when talking to someone who is older than the speaker or to show respect (to a professor, for example).

As in many Turkic languages, personal pronouns can be omitted, and they are only added for emphasis.

Since 1992, North Azerbaijani has used a phonetic writing system, so pronunciation is easy: most words are pronounced exactly as they are spelled. However, the combination qq in words is pronounced [kɡ], as the first voiced velar stop is devoiced when it is geminated, such as in çaqqal, pronounced [t͡ʃɑkɡɑl].

Category	English	North Azerbaijani (in Latin script)
Basic expressions	yes	hə /hæ/ (informal), bəli (formal)
Basic expressions	no	yox /jox/ (informal), xeyr (formal)
Basic expressions	hello	salam /sɑlɑm/
Basic expressions	goodbye	sağ ol /ˈsɑɣ ol/
Basic expressions	goodbye	sağ olun /ˈsɑɣ olun/ (formal)
Basic expressions	good morning	sabahınız xeyir /sɑbɑhɯ(nɯ)z xejiɾ/
Basic expressions	good afternoon	günortanız xeyir /ɟynoɾt(ɑn)ɯz xejiɾ/
Basic expressions	good evening	axşamın xeyir /ɑxʃɑmɯn xejiɾ/
Basic expressions	good evening	axşamınız xeyir /ɑxʃɑmɯ(nɯ)z xejiɾ/
Colours	black	qara /ɡɑɾɑ/
Colours	blue	göy /ɟœj/
Colours	brown	qəhvəyi / qonur
Colours	grey	boz /boz/
Colours	green	yaşıl /jaʃɯl/
Colours	orange	narıncı /nɑɾɯnd͡ʒɯ/
Colours	pink	çəhrayı /t͡ʃæhɾɑjɯ/
Colours	purple	bənövşəyi /bænœy̑ʃæji/
Colours	red	qırmızı /ɡɯɾmɯzɯ/
Colours	white	ağ /ɑɣ/
Colours	yellow	sarı /sɑɾɯ/
Colours	golden	qızıl

=== Numbers ===
Number	Word
0	sıfır /ˈsɯfɯɾ/
1	bir /biɾ/
2	iki /ici/
3	üç /yt͡ʃ/
4	dörd /dœɾd/
5	beş /beʃ/
6	altı /ɑltɯ/
7	yeddi /jeddi/
8	səkkiz /sæcciz/
9	doqquz /dokɡuz/
10	on /on/

The numbers 11–19 are constructed as on bir and on iki, literally meaning "ten-one, ten-two" and so on up to on doqquz ("ten-nine").

Number	Word
20	iyirmi /ijiɾmi/ (Note: /iɾmi/ is also found in standard speech.)
30	otuz /otuz/
40	qırx /ɡɯɾx/
50	əlli /ælli/

Greater numbers are constructed by combining in tens and thousands larger to smaller in the same way, without using a conjunction in between.

== Sample text ==
Article 1 of the Universal Declaration of Human Rights:

Arabic script (until 1926)

بُتون إنسان‌لَر لَیاقَت و حُقوق‌لَرینه گوره آزاد و بَرابَر طوغُلورلَر. اونلَرِݣ شعورلَری و وِجدانلَری وار و بِر بِرلَرینه مُناسِبَت‌ده قَرداش‌لِق روحنده طاورانمه‌لیدِرلَر.

Arabic script (1926–1928)

بۆتون اینسانلار لیاقت و حۆقوقلارینا گؤره آزاد و برابر دوْغولورلار. اوٓنلارین شۆعورلاری و ویجدانلاری وار و بیر-بیرلرینه مۆناسیبتده قارداشلیق روحوندا داورانمالیدیرلار.

Latin script (1928–1933)

Butun insanlar ləjakət və hukykları̡na ƣɵrə azad və bərabər dogylyrlar. Onları̡ŋ зuyrları̡ və vicdanları̡ var və bir-birlərinə munasibətdə kardaзlı̡k ryhynda davranmalı̡dı̡rlar.

Yañalif (1933–1939)

Bytyn insanlar ləjaqət və hyquqlarьna gɵrə azad və вəraвər doƣulurlar. Onlarьŋ şyurlarь və viçdanlarь var və вir-вirlərinə mynasiвətdə qardaşlьq ruhunda davranmalьdьrlar.

Cyrillic script (1940–1958)

Бүтүн инсанлар ләягәт вә һүгугларына ҝөрә азад вә бәрабәр доғулурлар. Онларын шүурлары вә виҹданлары вар вә бир-бирләринә мүнасибәтдә гардашлыг руһунда давранмалыдырлар.

Cyrillic script (1958–1991)

Бүтүн инсанлар ләјагәт вә һүгугларына ҝөрә азад вә бәрабәр доғулурлар. Онларын шүурлары вә виҹданлары вар вә бир-бирләринә мүнасибәтдә гардашлыг руһунда давранмалыдырлар.

Latin script (1991–1992)

Bütün insanlar läyaqät vä hüquqlarına görä azad vä bärabär doğulurlar. Onların şüurları vä vicdanları var vä bir-birlärinä münasibätdä qardaşlıq ruhunda davranmalıdırlar.

Latin script (1992–present)

Bütün insanlar ləyaqət və hüquqlarına görə azad və bərabər doğulurlar. Onların şüurları və vicdanları var və bir-birlərinə münasibətdə qardaşlıq ruhunda davranmalıdırlar.

Narrow IPA transcription, based on the Azerbaijani standard

[byˈt̪ʏ̃n̪ ʔɪ̃n̪s̪ɑ̝̃n̪ˈɫ̪ɑ̝ɾ l̪æ̝jɑ̝ːˈgæ̝t̪ væ̝ ɦygugl̪ɑ̝ɾɯ̞̃ˈn̪ɑ̝ ɟœ̝ˈɾæ̝ ʔɑ̞ːˈz̪ɑ̝t̪ væ̝ bæ̝ɾɑ̝ːˈbæ̝ɾ d̪o̞ɣʊɫ̪ʊɾˈɫ̪ɑ̝ɾ ‖ ʔõ̞n̪ɫ̪ɑ̝ˈɾɯ̞̃n̪ ʃyʔʊɾɫ̪ɑ̝ˈɾɯ̞ væ̝ vid͡ʒd̪ɑ̝̃n̪ɫ̪ɑ̝ˈɾɯ̞ ʋɑ̝ɾ væ̝ ˌbɪɾ‿bɪɾl̪æ̝ɾɪ̃ˈn̪æ̝ mʏ̃n̪ɑ̝ːs̪ibæ̝t̪̚ˈd̪æ̝ gɑ̝ɾd̪ɑ̝ʃˈɫ̪ɯ̞χ ɾuːɦʊ̃n̪ˈd̪ɑ̝ d̪ɑ̝ʋɾɑ̝̃n̪mɑ̝ɫ̪ɯ̞d̪ɯ̞ˈɫ̪ɑ̝ɾ ‖]

English translation

All human beings are born free and equal in dignity and rights. They are endowed with reason and conscience and should act towards one another in a spirit of brotherhood.

== Bibliography ==
- Əlizadə, Solmaz (2020). "Diphthongization in Azerbaijani Language" (PDF). Topical Issues in the Humanities: Intercollegiate Collection of Scientific Papers of Young Scientists of Ivan Franko Drohobych State Pedagogical University. 2 (30). Ivan Franko National University of Lviv: 10–16. doi:10.24919/2308-4863.2/30.212274. S2CID 224941226.
- Barthold, W. & Wixman, R. (1978). "Ḳarapapak͟h". In van Donzel, E.; Lewis, B.; Pellat, Ch. & Bosworth, C. E. (eds.). The Encyclopaedia of Islam, Second Edition. Volume IV: Iran–Kha. Leiden: E. J. Brill. ISBN 978-90-04-05745-6. OCLC 758278456.
- Bournoutian, George (2017). "The Population of the South Caucasus according to the 1897 General Census of the Russian Empire". Iran and the Caucasus. 21 (3): 324–340. doi:10.1163/1573384X-20170307.
- Brown, Keith, ed. (24 November 2005). Encyclopedia of Language and Linguistics. Elsevier. ISBN 978-0-08-054784-8.
- Kök, Ali (2016). "Modern Oğuz Türkçesi Diyalektlerinde Göçüşme" [Migration in Modern Oghuz Turkish Dialects]. 21. Yüzyılda Eğitim ve Toplum Eğitim Bilimleri ve Sosyal Araştırmalar Dergisi (in Turkish). 5 (15). ISSN 2147-0928.
- Mokari, Payam Ghaffarvand; Werner, Stefan (2016). Dziubalska-Kolaczyk, Katarzyna (ed.). "An acoustic description of spectral and temporal characteristics of Azerbaijani vowels". Poznań Studies in Contemporary Linguistics. 52 (3). doi:10.1515/psicl-2016-0019. S2CID 151826061.
- Mokari, Payam Ghaffarvand; Werner, Stefan (2017). "Azerbaijani". Journal of the International Phonetic Association. 47 (2): 207. doi:10.1017/S0025100317000184. S2CID 232347049.
- Səlimi, Hüseynqulu (1976). A generative phonology of Azerbaijani (PhD). University of Florida. OCLC 1045615622. ARK 13960/t1tf4s495. OL 18319A.
- Sinor, Denis (1969). Inner Asia. History-Civilization-Languages. A syllabus. Bloomington. pp. 71–96. ISBN 978-0-87750-081-0.
- Schönig, Claus (1998). "Azerbaijanian". The Turkic Languages. London: Routledge: 248.
