= Postalveolar affricate =

Postalveolar affricates are a type of consonant sound. The most common postalveolar affricates are:

- Voiced postalveolar affricate (d͡ʒ)
- Voiceless postalveolar affricate (t͡ʃ)
