= Turkmenia =

Turkmenia may refer to:

- Turkmenistan:
  - Another name for the Turkmen Soviet Socialist Republic
  - The present sovereign state of Turkmenistan
- 2584 Turkmenia
