= Stephen Dale =

Stephen Frederic Dale, also known as Stephen F. Dale, is a historian and academic, Emeritus Professor at the Ohio State University, known for his studies on eastern Islamic world (southern and central Asia).

Dale studied at Carleton College and graduated from University of California, Berkeley. He previously taught at the Universities of Chicago and Minnesota. He first visited India in the 1963 as a Fulbright Lecturer at the Banaras Hindu University. He returned to India in the 1967 to carry out research on the Muslims of Kerala.

== Bibliography ==
- Islamic Society on the South Asian Frontier: The Mappilas of Malabar (1980)
- Indian Merchants and Eurasian Trade (1994)
- The Garden of the Eight Paradises: Babur and the Culture of Empire in Central Asia, Afghanistan and India (2004)
- The Muslim Empires of the Ottomans, Safavids and Mughals (2014)
- The Orange Trees of Marrakesh: Ibn Khaldun and the Science of Man (2015)
- Babur: Timurid Prince and Mughal Emperor (2018)
