= Turkomania =

Historical geographic term for Central and Eastern Anatolia

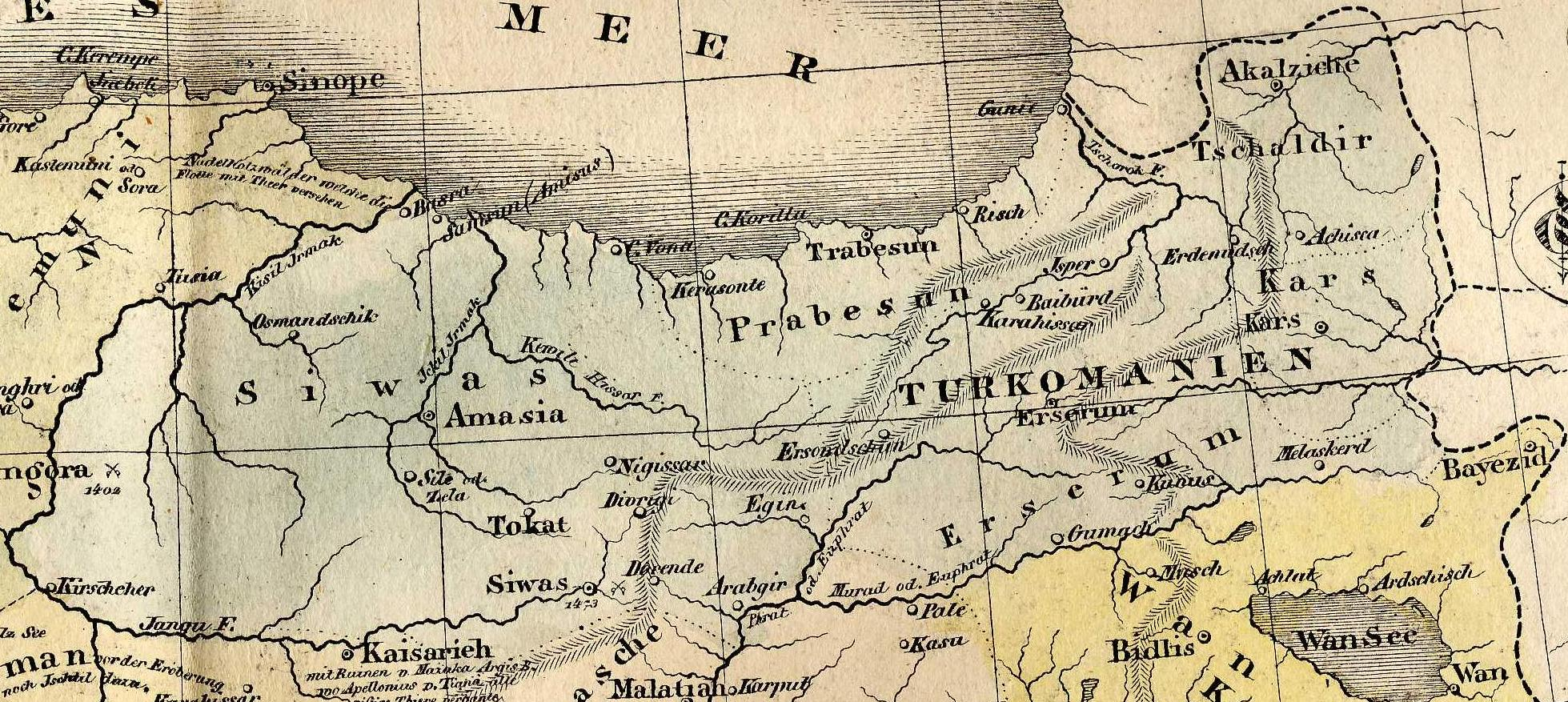
Map of Turcomania in antiquity, 1829

Turcomania or Turkomania was a historical geographic term appearing in maps and travel accounts for Central and Eastern Anatolia of present-day Turkey from the Middle Ages through the early modern period. It was used to describe a region not based on administrative boundaries, but on the presence of Turkomans by outside observers.

In Latin, the name Turcomania means “land of the Turcomans”, following a common Latin convention of using the -ia suffix to denote places associated with a particular people.

== History ==
=== Ethnic composition ===
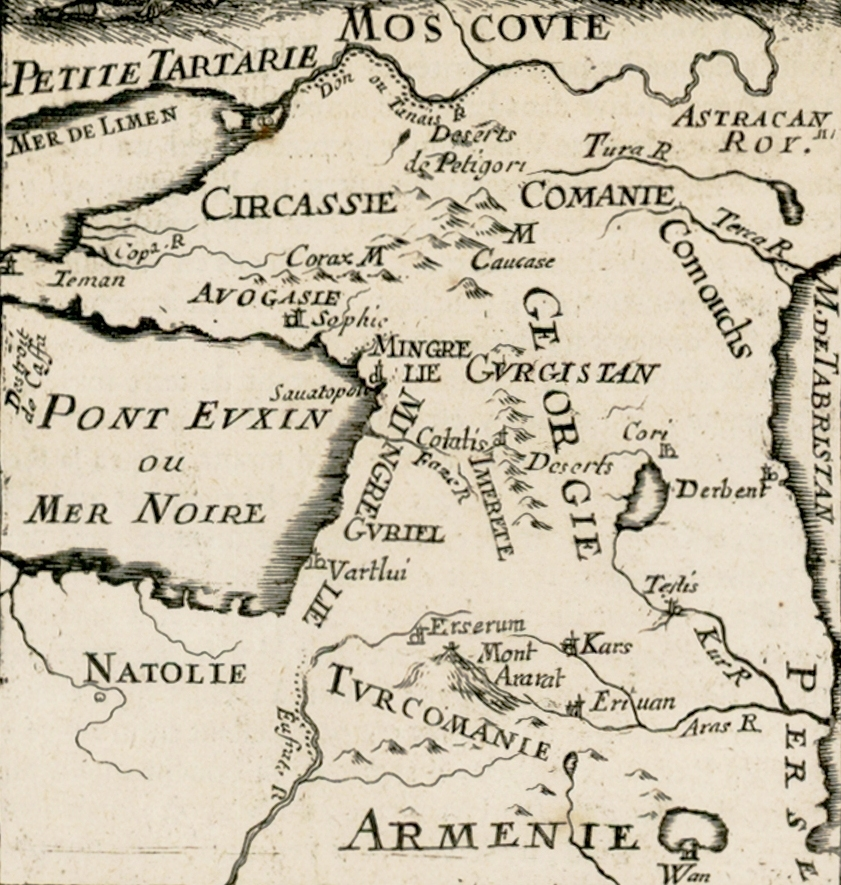
Map of Armenia and Georgia (Alain Manesson Mallet, 1683)

From the 13th century onward, several medieval sources and modern studies affirm the presence of Turkoman tribes in Central and Eastern Anatolia, commonly referred to under the name Turcomania. In The Travels of Marco Polo, the Venetian explorer Marco Polo provides a 13th-century account of the region, describing the inhabitants of Turcomania as following:

In Turcomania there are three classes of people. First there are the Turcomans; these are worshippers of Mahommet, a rude people with an uncouth language of their own. They dwell among mountains and downs where they find good pasture for their occupation is cattle-keeping. Excellent horses, known as Turquans, are reared in their country, and also very valuable mules. The other two classes are the Armenians and Greeks, who live mixt with the former in the towns and villages, occupying themselves with trade and handicrafts.

The ethnonym "Turkoman" was historically used to designate the Oghuz Turkic nomadic groups during the Middle Ages. These groups began migrating into Anatolia in large numbers following the Battle of Manzikert in 1071, a pivotal event that facilitated Seljuk expansion and the establishment of various Turkic dynasties and empires across the region.

=== Travelogues and cartography ===
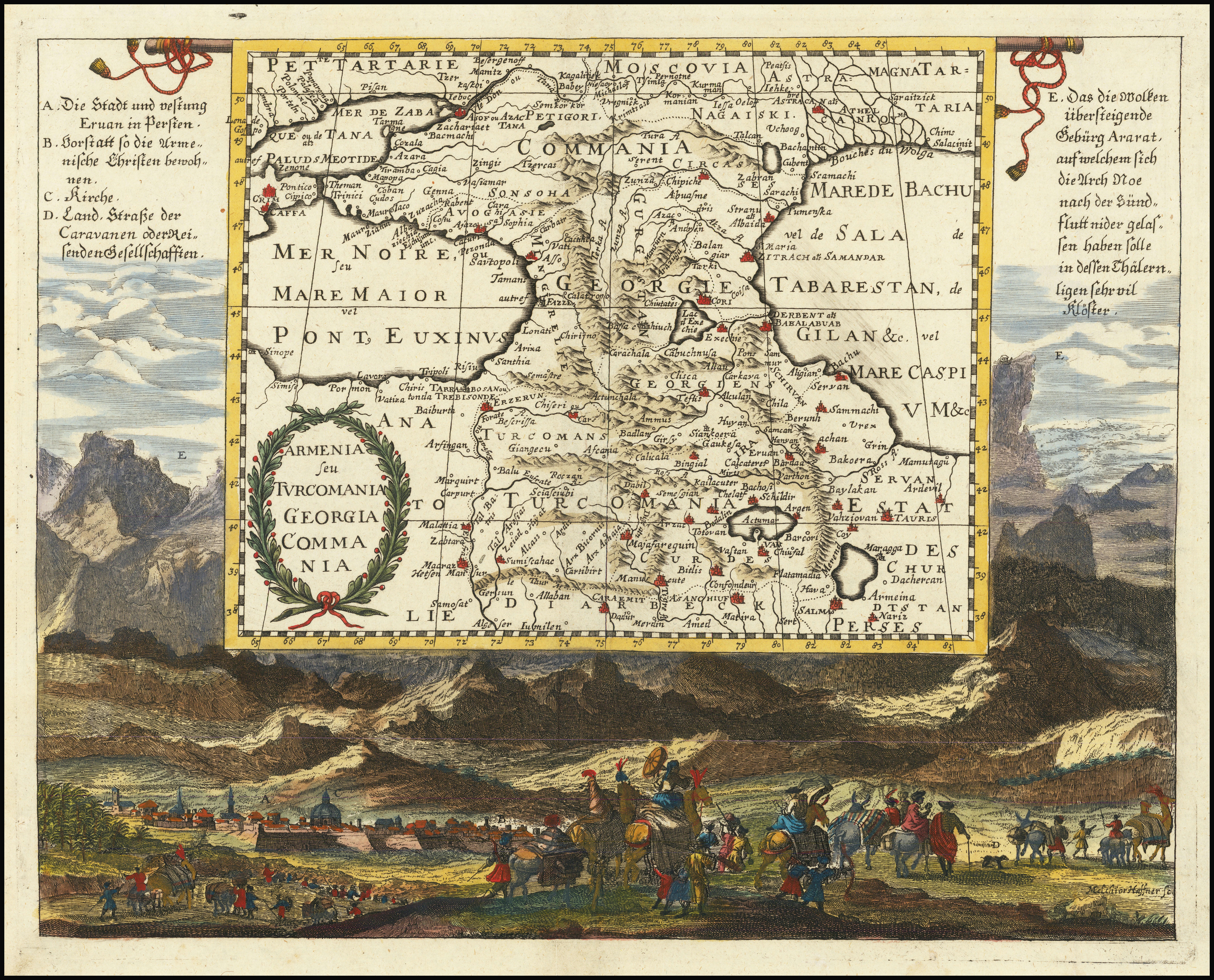
"Armenia or Turcomania, Georgia, Commania" (Johann Christoph Wagner, 1686)

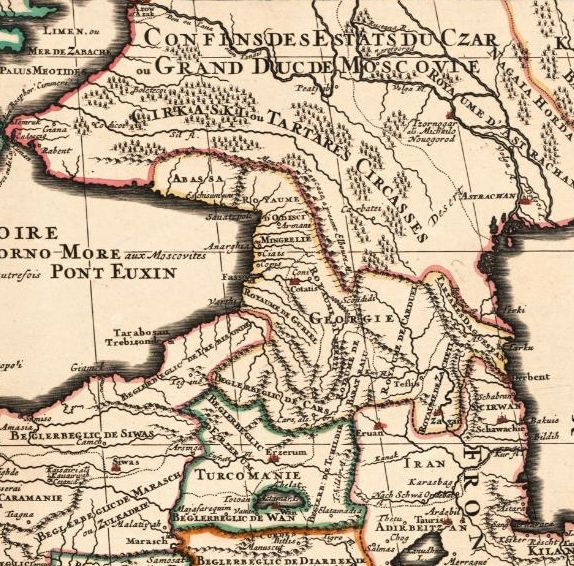
Map of Ottoman Empire and its divisions (Hubert Jaillot, 1696)

The term Turcomania was primarily used by European travelers and cartographers to describe areas inhabited by Turkomans. Among the earliest references appears in The Travels of Marco Polo, where Marco Polo refers to it as “the province of Turcomania”, a region encompassing much of the former Seljuk realm in Central Anatolia. In addition, Marco recounts traveling “northward into Turcomania, past Caesarea and Sivas, to Erzincan”. Other medieval geographical narratives mention Turcomania, such as the 13th-century missionary and explorer William of Rubruck describing his journey "through Georgia, Armenia, and Turcomania".

By contrast, from the 17th to the 19th centuries, travelers increasingly associated Turcomania with the Armenian Highlands and parts of the Upper Mesopotamia. For example, in The Preacher's Travels, the English traveler John Cartwright notes that the Kingdom of Armenia was now called Turcomania, which "was the first seat of the Turks after their first coming out of Scythia".

During this period, many travelers treated Turcomania and Armenia as overlapping or even synonymous regions within Eastern Anatolia. One example of this is the account of the French botanist Joseph Pitton de Tournefort, who in his 1700 voyage described a march through “Great Armenia or Turcomania” while touring the eastern parts of the Ottoman Empire. Cartographers also used Turcomania interchangeably with Eastern Anatolia, as seen in the 1686 map by Johann Christoph Wagner titled Armenia seu Turcomania, Georgia, Commania (“Armenia or Turcomania, Georgia, Commania”). Similarly, an 1829 German map of the Ottoman Empire labels the province of modern-day Erzurum as Turkomanien.

By the late 19th century, Western geographers abandoned the term Turcomania in favor of more standardized labels such as Asia Minor, Turkey, or specific Ottoman provincial names.
