= Old Anatolian Turkish =

1000s–1400s stage of the Turkish language

- Old Turkish
- تُركجَ
- Native to: Anatolia
- Era: Originated from Anatolia late 11th century until developed into Ottoman Turkish and Ajami Turkic c. 15th century
- Language family: Turkic: Common Turkic; Oghuz; Western Oghuz; Old Anatolian Turkish
- Standard forms: Ottoman Turkish (in Ottoman Turkey); Ajami Turkic (in Shirvan and Azerbaijan)
- Writing system: Ottoman Turkish alphabet augmented with ḥarakāt

Language codes
- ISO 639-3: –
- Linguist List: 1ca Old Anatolian Turkish
- Glottolog: None

Old Anatolian Turkish (Note: Abbreviated as OAT.) (Azerbaijani: Qədim Anadolu Türkcəsi, Turkish: Eski Anadolu Türkçesi), (Note: Abbreviated as ET/EAT) also referred to as Old Anatolian Turkic, was the form of the Turkish language spoken in Anatolia from the 11th to 15th centuries. It developed into Early Ottoman Turkish and Ajemi Turkic (Middle Azerbaijani). It was written in the Perso-Arabic script. Unlike in later Ottoman Turkish, short-vowel diacritics were used.

It had no official status until 1277, when Mehmet I of Karaman declared a firman in an attempt to break the dominance of Persian:

شِمْدَنْ كِرُوٖ هیجْ کِمَسْنَه قَاپُودَه وَ دِیوَانْدَه وَ مَجَالِسْ وَ‌ سَیْرَانْدَه تُركِی دِلِنْدَنْ غَیْرِی دِلْ سُویْلَمَیَالَرْ

Şimdän girü hiç kimäsnä qapuda vä divanda vä mecalis vä säyranda Türki dilindän ğayri dil söylämäyälar.

From now on nobody in the palace, in the divan, council, and at the hearings should speak any language other than Turkish/Turkic.

== History ==
It is assumed that the Old Anatolian Turkish literary language was created in Anatolia and that its authors transformed a primitive language into a literary medium by submitting themselves to Persian influence. The Oghuz Turks who came to Anatolia brought an already heavily Persian-influenced language, literary traditions and models from the Iranian regions of Khwarezm and Transoxiana.

The Ajem-Turkic started to form its shape in the Aq Qoyunlu, Qara Qoyunlu eras, and the Safavid era. From the 18th, to 20th century Ajem-Turkic would go on to develop into modern Azerbaijani.

== Examples ==
Following texts are excerpts of the Qabus-Nama, taken from Turan Fikret's work: "Old Anatolian Turkish: Syntactic Structure" (1996):

- bizüm delilümüz: "Our proofs."
- devletlü gişiler: "Fortunate ones."
- zinhār zinhār: "Never."
- pīrlikde yigitlenmek rüsvāylıqdur: "It is a shame to act like a young man in old age."
- bulardan artanı beytü’l mālda qoyalar: "They should put in public treasury that which remained from them."
- birgün bu ilçiyile oturur iken Qısri Büzürcmihre sorar: "One day when he was sitting with this [foreign] ambassador, Chosroes asked Bozorgmehr."
- Kelām-ı mecīd: "The word of the most glorious (God), the Qoran."
- dar'ül-harb: "Countries outside of the domain of Islam."
- Taŋrı aŋa raḥmet itmez: "God does not forgive him."
- aġırlaŋ aṭaŋuzı anaŋuzı egerçi kāfirse daqı: "Respect your parents even if they are unbelievers."
- Ne qul kim alam āzāz olsun: "Every slave that I would buy should be freed"
- ve cāhil gişileri gişi sanma ve hünersüzleri bilür sayma: "And do not consider the ignorant ones the [real] men, and [do not consider] the untalented ones the knowledgeable ones."
- zinhār işüŋi ṭanışmaqdan ʿārlanma: "Beware, and never be ashamed of learning your job."
- sen yalan söyleyesi gişi degülsin: "You are not someone who would lie."
- artuq zaḥmet çeküp artuq ṭamaʿ eyleme: "Do not work hard to satisfy your greed."
- eger sen Taŋrıya muṭīʿ olmayup bunlardan muṭīʿlıq isteyüp bunlara zaḥmet virür iseŋ Taŋrılıq daʿvīsin itmiş olursın: "If you yourself do not obey God and ask these people for obedience [for you] and oppress them, then you are considered as someone pretending to be God."
- yaʿnī bir şaḫsuŋ bir sarayda naṣībi olsa andan ol naṣībi ṣatsa ne qadardur bāyiʿyā müşterī bilmese Ebū Ḥanīfeden üç rivāyetdür: "In other words, if someone has a share in a palace and then if he sells it without either seller or buyer knowing the exact value of it, then there are three traditions according to Abû Ḥanîfe."
- benüm dostlarum beni ġāyet sevdüklerinden baŋa ʿaybum dimezler idi ve düşmānlarum benüm ʿaybumı ḫalqa söylerler idi: "Because my friends liked me very much they did not say my shortcomings to me, [but] my enemies told the people my shortcomings."
- ben eyittim sübḥān Allāh qırq iki yaşında gişi neçün şöyle içekim nerdübāŋ ayaġın nice urasın bilmeye düşe ve dün buçuġında neçün şöyle yörüye kim şunuŋ gibi vāqıʿaya uġraya: "I said ‘O God why would a person of forty-two years of age drink so much that he can not judge how to put his feet on the steps of a ladder, so he falls, and also why would he walk like that in the middle of the night when feeling this way."

== Orthography ==
Old Anatolian Turkish	Ottoman Turkish (Kamus-ı Türki spelling)	Modern Turkish	Modern Azerbaijani	English
گُزلٔر	كوزلر	gözler	gözlər	eyes
دَدَ	دده	dede	dədə (father)	grandfather
كُچُك	كوچك	küçük	kiçik	little

== Alphabet ==
Letter	Modern Turkish	Letter	Modern Turkish
ا	a, e, i	ص	s
ب	b	ض	d
پ	p	ط	t
ت	t	ظ	z
ث	s	ع	a
ج	c	غ	ğ, g
چ	ç	ف	f
ح	h	ق	k
خ	h	ك	k
د	d	ل	l
ذ	d, z	م	m
ر	r	ن	n
ز	z	و	o, ö, u, ü, v
ژ	j	ه	h
س	s	لا	la, le
ش	ş	ى	i, y, ı

== See also ==
- Ottoman Turkish
- Turkish language
- Kesik Baş
- Karamanids
