= Afshar dialect =

Oghuz Turkic variety spoken primarily in Iran

Afshar
- افشر, Əfşar
- Native to: Iran, Afghanistan
- Ethnicity: Afshars
- Language family: Turkic: Common Turkic; Oghuz; (disputed); Afshar
- Dialects: Hamadān Afshar; Kermān Afshar; Kabul Afshar
- Writing system: Perso-Arabic script, Latin script

Language codes
- ISO 639-3: (included in Azerbaijani [azb])
- Glottolog: afsh1238

Afshar or Afshari (Azerbaijani: Əfşar) is a Turkic dialect spoken in Iran and Afghanistan by the Afshars. Ethnologue and Glottolog list it as a dialect of the Azerbaijani language. The Encyclopædia Iranica lists it as a separate Southern Oghuz language.

According to the third edition of the Encyclopaedia of Islam:

Linguistically, Afshārī is classified as a dialect belonging to the South Oghuz group of Turkic languages (southwestern branch of Turkic) (Johanson, History of Turkic, 82–3), or else as a dialect of Azerbaijani (Azeri). As they were embedded in a Fārsī-speaking environment, however, in many cases Fārsī became the mother tongue of the Afshārs. Other groups became bilingual (as in Kirmān). Additionally, the contact between the different languages seems to have transformed the original dialect (cf. Johanson, Discoveries, 14–6). In 2009 a linguistic comparison of different Afshār groups remains outstanding.

Afshar is distinguished by many loanwords from Persian and a rounding of the phoneme /a/ to [ɒ], as occurred in Uzbek. In many cases, vowels that are rounded in Azerbaijani are not rounded in Afshar. An example of this is /jiz/ (meaning 100), which is /jyz/ in standard Azerbaijani.

According to Lars Johanson, emeritus professor of Turcology and linguistics at the University of Mainz, and Eva Csato, professor emeritus in Turkic languages at Uppsala University, state that the Afshar dialect as SW^{S}; Southwestern South Oghuz group that includes the dialects of Iran (such as Qashqai, Sonqori, Aynallu, etc.) and Afghanistan (e.g., Afshar).

== See also ==
- Afsharid dynasty

== Literature ==
- Doerfer, Gerhard; Hesche, Wolfram (1989). Südoghusische Materialen aus Afghanistan und Iran. Wiesbaden: Harrassowitz. ISBN 3-447-02786-X.
- Johanson, Lars; Csato, Eva, eds. (2024). The Turkic Languages (2nd ed.). Routledge.
