= Turkmen in Pakistan =

Total population
- c. 60,000-120,000

Regions with significant populations
- Gilgit-Baltistan; Khyber Pakhtunkhwa; Punjab; Balochistan; Islamabad-Rawalpindi; Karachi

Languages
- Persian (Dari); Urdu; Turkmen

Religion
- Islam

Related ethnic groups
- Uyghurs in Pakistan; Kyrgyz in Pakistan; Uzbeks in Pakistan; Tajiks in Pakistan

Turkmens in Pakistan are predominantly refugees who first fled from their native Turkmenistan to Afghanistan in the aftermath of the 1917 Bolshevik revolution, and then from Afghanistan to neighbouring Pakistan following the instability during the Soviet invasion of Afghanistan. Consequently, a large number have been in Pakistan for decades and many are part of second and third generations. In 2005 the United Nations estimated that 60,733 Turkmen from Afghanistan resided in Pakistan.

== Carpet industry ==
Turkmen in Pakistan are pioneers of a carpet industry. In order to make a living, many have taken on the role of producing Turkmen rugs which are in great demand both inside and outside the country. In Turkmen culture, carpet-weaving is a tradition tracing back to nomadic roots; today, the trade is the primary source of sustenance and economic opportunities for the community. Those in the industry are consigned by Pakistani wholesalers who provide designs and patterns, with a pay of 2,000 to 3,000 rupees per square meter. By working each day from early in the morning until late in the evening, one person is usually able produce a square meter within a month. The business has transformed Turkmen villages into giant sweatshops. Many Turkmen have claimed to be better off economically than the million or so Afghan refugees in Pakistan.

== Society ==
Most of the Turkmen are based in the northern parts of the country; the town of Babu, near Peshawar, is the largest settlement camp. The land they live on is courtesy of the Pakistani government and years ago they received international assistance to build their homes; however, living conditions have sometimes been described as inadequate with few electric lines and difficulties in access to water. Many refugees also do not have the resources to rent fields and grow crops in surrounding farmlands.

A considerable portion of Turkmen immigrants in Pakistan are originally Afghan nationals who migrated into the country less than two decades ago. A 2005 census showed there were over 6,000 Afghan Turkmen living in the province of Balochistan alone and they formed an overall 0.8% of the local Afghan population.

== See also ==
- Pakistan–Turkmenistan relations
- Turkmen in Syria
