= Pakistan–Uzbekistan relations =

Diplomatic relationship between Pakistan and Uzbekistan

- Pakistan: Uzbekistan

Diplomatic mission
- Pakistani Embassy, Tashkent: Uzbek Embassy, Islamabad

Envoy
- Ambassador Irfan Yusuf Shami: Ambassador Furqat Sidiqov

Pakistan–Uzbekistan relations are the foreign relations between Pakistan and Uzbekistan. Pakistan has an embassy in Tashkent, while Uzbekistan has an embassy in Islamabad. Pakistan and Uzbekistan are members of different international forums including the United Nations, Organisation of Islamic Cooperation (OIC), Economic Cooperation Organization (ECO) and Shanghai Cooperation Organisation (SCO). The Pakistan-Uzbekistan Joint Ministerial Commission (JMC) is held on a regular basis.

== History ==
Relations between the two states were established when the republic of Uzbekistan became independent following the collapse of the USSR in 1991. Pakistan was one of the first countries to recognize the independence of Uzbekistan, though relations between the two countries were initially strained by the situation in Afghanistan which both countries border, as they supported opposing Afghan factions. However, relations improved after the fall of the Taliban, as well as the death of Uzbek President Islam Karimov and subsequent deepening of Uzbek outreach to regional countries under his successor, Shavkat Mirziyoyev. Both countries have a cordial and deepening relationship, as the two countries' interests in Afghanistan have become aligned, with Uzbekistan formally hosting a Taliban delegation in 2019. Pakistan further wishes to gain access to Central Asian markets, while landlocked Uzbekistan wants to access ports on the Arabian Sea.

== Economic relations ==
Trade between both countries is increasing, rising threefold between 2018 and 2019, though bilateral trade in 2018 was low at $90 million on account of difficulties in transit across war-torn Afghanistan. The first direct flights between the countries began in 2018 between Tashkent and Lahore, launched by Uzbekistan Airways, and are expected to further increase trade between the two countries.

In February 2026, Uzbekistan government officials reported that around 80 Pakistani companies of Pakistani origin have been registered in Uzbekistan over the past year, reflecting a growing trend of business engagement between the two countries. The registered companies form part of a broader commercial presence that includes some 228 Pakistani firms currently operating in Uzbekistan, with others in the pipeline.

== Uzbeks in Pakistan ==
The Uzbek population in Pakistan numbers roughly 1 million and consists of a small number of Uzbek immigrants from Uzbekistan and a much larger number of Uzbek refugees from northern Afghanistan (around 2.3% of Afghans in Pakistan are Uzbeks). 4000 words common in both languages are found in Pakistan's and Uzbekistan's national languages.

== Resident diplomatic missions ==
- Pakistan has an embassy in Tashkent.
- Uzbekistan has an embassy in Islamabad.

== See also ==
- Uzbeks in Pakistan
- Foreign relations of Pakistan
- Foreign relations of Uzbekistan
- Pakistani diaspora
