= Uyghurs in Pakistan =

Ethnic group in Pakistan

پاكىستاندىكى ئۇيغۇرلار (Uyghur); پاکستان میں اویغور (Urdu)

Total population
- 2,000–3,000

Regions with significant populations
- Islamabad, Karachi, Gilgit-Baltistan, Rawalpindi

Languages
- Uyghur · Urdu · Mandarin · Punjabi · Kashmiri

Religion
- Predominantly Sunni Islam

Related ethnic groups
- Uzbeks, Kazakhs and Kyrgyz

Uyghurs in Pakistan are a small community of ethnic Uyghurs who live in Pakistan that originate from Xinjiang, China.

== Migration history ==
Some members of ethnic minorities of China, primarily Muslim Uyghurs from Xinjiang, have historically migrated to and settled in the northern parts of Pakistan. The earliest migrants, numbering in the thousands, came in as traders during the late 19th and early 20th centuries when the area that is Pakistan was still under British rule. Most of these Uyghurs used to have warehouses and residences in towns in the North and in parts of upper Punjab and used to travel between Kashgar and Yarkand and these places, regularly. Others came in the 1940s in fear of communist persecution. A few hundred more fled to Pakistan in the aftermath of a failed uprising in Khotan in 1954. Later waves of migration came in 1963 and again in 1974. Some Pakistani descendants who previously lived in Xinjiang, especially at Kashgar, have also moved back to Pakistan with their Uyghur spouses.

Beginning in the 1980s, Pakistan began to become a major transit point for Uyghurs going on the hajj; the temporary Uyghur settlements that formed there became the focal points of later, more permanent communities, as Uyghurs returning from their pilgrimage or from further studies at schools in Egypt and Saudi Arabia decided to settle down in Pakistan rather than return to China. As of 2020, community leaders estimated their total numbers at 2,000 to 3,000 people, with 800 at Gilgit, another 2,000 at Rawalpindi, 100 at the border town of Sust on the Karakoram Highway and the remainder scattered throughout the rest of the country.

== Social integration ==
China has been suspicious of some members of the Uyghur community in Pakistan, viewing them as supporters of the East Turkestan independence movement. Pakistan has given them a friendly reception, but rejects any promotion of separatism or anything that challenges another country's sovereign integrity. Many Uyghurs in Pakistan run small businesses. In recent years, they have moved into the import-export field, buying Chinese ceramics, textiles, and other products from Xinjiang for resale in Pakistan. The Uyghur community are usually well-integrated into Pakistani society. Intermarriage is common now, and most prefer to speak Urdu rather than Uyghur.

=== Terrorism and extremism ===
A number of Uyghurs residing in Pakistan; especially remote northwestern mountainous tribal areas have been engaged in militancy and carrying out terrorist attacks on local military and civilian targets. China claimed that members of the East Turkestan Islamic Movement have taken refuge in Lahore. In 1997, fourteen Uyghur students with Chinese nationality studying in Pakistan were deported back to China after they organised a sympathy protest in support of riots in Ghulja; Amnesty International claims that they were executed. In 2009, another nine Uyghur militants captured in Waziristan were extradited to China.

As of 2015, the Pakistani government asserted that Uyghur militants were no longer present in the tribal areas of northwest Pakistan after successful counter-insurgent military operations.

== Community organisations ==
=== Omar Uyghur Trust ===
Omar and Akbar Khan, two Uyghur brothers in Pakistan, set up a cultural organisation, the Omar Uyghur Trust, to educate their community's children in the Uyghur language and culture.

=== Guesthouses ===
Pakistan also used to have a number of Uyghur community reception centres. Kashgarabad, located in Islamabad, was run by wealthy Uyghur traders. Anwar ul-Ulum Abu Hanifa Madrassah was run by a man named Sheikh Serajuddin in Rawalpindi. A third, Hotanabad, was also located near Islamabad. Hotanabad was shut down in December 2000, a situation which the Uyghur American Association also attributes to pressure from China, which expressed concerns about these centers of facilitating recruitment for extremism against Beijing. Kashgarabad and Hotanabad both suffered another shutdown in 2006.

== Notable people ==
- Abdul Rasul, Pakistani citizen of Uyghur ethnicity, leader of the Asian Muslims Human Rights Bureau.
- Hakim Said, Pakistani herbalist.
- Sadia Rashid, Pakistani academic.

== See also ==
- Chinese people in Pakistan
- List of Uyghurs
