= Pakistan–Turkmenistan relations =

- Pakistan: Turkmenistan

Diplomatic mission
- Embassy of Pakistan, Ashghabat: Embassy of Turkmenistan, Islamabad

Envoy
- Ambassador Faryal Leghari: Ambassador Atadjan Movlamov

Relations between Turkmenistan and Pakistan were established after Turkmenistan became independent from the Soviet Union. Both countries are members of the Economic Cooperation Organization, Non-Aligned Movement and Group of 77. Pakistan has an embassy in Ashgabat. Turkmenistan has an embassy in Islamabad.

== History ==
Pakistan was one of the first countries to recognize the independence of Turkmenistan in December 1991. Formal diplomatic relations were established on 10 May 1992. In October 1994, Pakistani Prime Minister Benazir Bhutto made her first state visit to Turkmenistan. Three years later, in October 1997, Prime Minister Nawaz Sharif also visited the Turkmen capital, Ashgabat. To celebrate the 10th anniversary of Turkmenistan's independence in 2001 Pakistan issued stamps bearing the flag of Turkmenistan. In May 2017, Pakistani Prime Minister Nawaz Sharif and Turkmen President Gurbanguly Berdimuhamedow held a meeting that marked 25 years since the establishment of diplomatic relations.

== Strategic ties ==
Pakistan has accorded approval to Turkmenistan for access to the warm water Gwadar Port as well as Iran and Russia, thus providing Turkmenistan direct access to the Arabian Sea.

== Economic relations ==
As part of the China-Pakistan Economic Corridor, Pakistan finalized land routes in January 2016 designed to provide access to Central Asian states, such as Turkmenistan to Pakistan. In November 2016, Pakistan joined the Ashgabat Agreement which aims to export Turkmen gas throughout the region in addition to the Lapis Lazuli corridor designed to facilitate trade.

Pakistan affirmed its commitments to Turkmenistan in a Sustainable Transport conference where Pakistan affirmed that "Regional connectivity, economic integration are key pillars of Pakistan's foreign policy."

Prime Minister Nawaz Sharif stated during a meeting with President Gurbanguly Berdimuhamedow declared that "Pakistan's priority is to expand trade and economic relations".

== See also ==
- Foreign relations of Pakistan
- Foreign relations of Turkmenistan
- Turkmen in Pakistan
- Turkmenistan–Afghanistan–Pakistan–India Pipeline
