= Uzbeks =

Turkic ethnic group of Central Asia

Özbeklar • Ўзбеклар • اۉزبېکلر

Total population
- c. 40 million

Regions with significant populations
- Uzbekistan: 34,901,261(2026 census)
- Afghanistan: c. 3.7 to 6.6 million (2025)
- Tajikistan: c. 1.2 million (2026)
- Kyrgyzstan: c. 1.1 million (2026)
- Pakistan: c. 1 million (2025)
- Kazakhstan: 695,557(2026)
- Turkmenistan: 642,476 (2022 census)
- Russia: 323,278 (2021 census)
- Saudi Arabia: 300,000 (2009)
- United States: 98,000 (2025) Both southern and northern Uzbeks included

Languages
- Northern Uzbek Southern Uzbek; Dari; Tajik; Russian

Religion
- Sunni Islam

Related ethnic groups
- Uyghurs, Äynu, Ili Turks, Tor Tajiks, and other Turkic peoples

Uzbeks (Uzbek: Özbeklar; Ўзбеклар; اۉزبېکلر) are a Turkic ethnic group native to Central Asia, and the largest Turkic ethnic group in the region. They comprise the majority population of Uzbekistan, alongside minorities of Tajiks and Karakalpaks, and also form minority groups in Afghanistan, Tajikistan, Kyrgyzstan, Pakistan, Kazakhstan, Turkmenistan, Russia, and China. Uzbek diaspora communities also exist in Turkey, Saudi Arabia, the United States, Ukraine, and other countries.

== Etymology ==
The name Uzbek seems to have become widely adopted as an ethnonym under the rule of Ozbeg Khan, who converted the Golden Horde to Islam.

The origin of the word Uzbek is disputed. One view holds that it is eponymously named after Oghuz Khagan, also known as Oghuz Beg, from which the word Uzbeg or Uzbek is derived. Another theory states that the name means 'independent', 'genuine man', or 'the lord himself', from öz (self) and the Turkic title bek/bey/beg.

The personal name Uzbek is found in Arabic and Persian historical writings. The historian Usama ibn Munqidh (d. 1188), describing events in Iran under the Seljuk Empire, notes that one of the leaders of Bursuk's troops in 1115–1116 was the "emir of the troops" Uzbek, the ruler of Mosul. According to Rashid al-Din, the last representative of the Oghuz dynasty of Ildegizids, who ruled in Tabriz, was Uzbek Muzaffar (1210–1225).

== Origins ==
Uzbeks are a Central Asian people primarily associated with Uzbekistan. They emerged through the mixing of settled Iranian populations with various Turkic and Mongol nomadic groups that entered the region between the 11th and 15th centuries. The ethnonym 'Uzbek' became associated with the region following the conquests of Muhammad Shaybani in the early sixteenth century. The Shibanid Uzbeks later founded several powerful Chinggisid and non-Chinggisid dynasties in Transoxiana and formed a ruling elite over local Iranian-speaking populations in the region, while maintaining a Mongol identity. The modern Uzbek nation was invented in 1924 by the Soviet Union during the Soviet national delimitation of Central Asia, and included not only the Shibanid Uzbeks, but also Sarts and Tajiks—groups that had not previously identified as Uzbek, either by themselves or by others.

Before the 5th century, what is now Uzbekistan was part of Sogdia, Khwarazm, and Bactria, and was mainly inhabited by Sogdians, Bactrians, and Khwarazmians—all Indo-Iranian peoples. It was part of the Achaemenid Empire in the sixth to fourth centuries BC, and by the 3rd century CE, it was part of the Sasanian Empire.

From the fifth to sixth centuries, what is now Uzbekistan was part of the Hephthalite Empire. From the sixth to eighth centuries, it was under the rule of the First Turkic Khaganate.

The Turkic component was part of the Kidarites in the fifth century. The seal of the Kidarites, made in the 5th century in Samarkand, has a Bactrian inscription containing the title of the ruler: "Oglar Khun", of Turkic origin.

Since the entry of Central Asia into the Turkic Khaganate (6th century), the process of Turkicization has intensified. In subsequent centuries, the main ethnocultural process that took place on the territory of the Central Asian interfluve was the convergence and partial merging of the settled, Iranian-speaking and Turkic-speaking, with the nomadic, mainly Turkic-speaking population.

Turkic and Chinese migration into Central Asia occurred during the Chinese Tang dynasty, and Chinese armies commanded by Turkic generals stationed in large parts of Central Asia. But Chinese influence ended with the An Lushan Rebellion. During the ninth and tenth centuries, Transoxiana was ruled by the Persian Samanid Empire. From the 11th century on, Transoxiana was under the rule of the Turkic Kara-Khanid Khanate, their arrival in Transoxiana signalled a definitive shift from Iranian to Turkic predominance in Central Asia. The Kara-Khanid ruler Sultan Satuq Bughra Khan was the first Turkic ruler to convert to Islam, most people of Central Asia soon followed. In the 12th century, Transoxiana was conquered by the Qara Khitai (Western Liao), a sinicized Khitan dynasty, they brought to Central Asia the Chinese system of government. In the 13th century, Kara-Khanid Khanate was destroyed by the Turkic Anushtegin dynasty, a former vassal of the Qara Khitai.

Although Turko-Mongol infiltration into Central Asia had started early, and the influence of the Turkic tribes was felt in Khwarazm before the campaigns of the Mongols, after the beginning of the Chingizid rule, bilingualism became more common. It is generally believed that these ancient Indo-European-speaking peoples were linguistically assimilated by smaller but dominant Turkic-speaking groups while the sedentary population finally adopted the Persian language, the traditional lingua franca of the eastern Islamic lands. The language-shift from Middle Iranian to Turkic and New Persian was predominantly the result of an elite dominance process. Peter B. Golden listed three basic ethnic elements contributing to the Uzbeks' ethnogenesis:

1. the Turkicized, formerly Iranian-speaking sedentary Sarts, a composite population including both Iranians (Sakas, Sogdians, Khwarzamians, Kushano-Bactrians) and some Arab elements;
2. the pre-Uzbek amalgam of nomadic Türk(î) or Chagatays, who consisted of Karluks, Yaghmas and other tribes of the Göktürks' khaganates, and later of the Kara-Khanid Khanate, Oghuz Turks, the Kangly-Kipchaks (particularly in the western region) and many Turkicized Mongol tribes, who entered Central Asia with the Mongol and Timurid conquests and invasions.
3. The East Kipchak-speaking "Pure Uzbeks" (Taza Özbek).

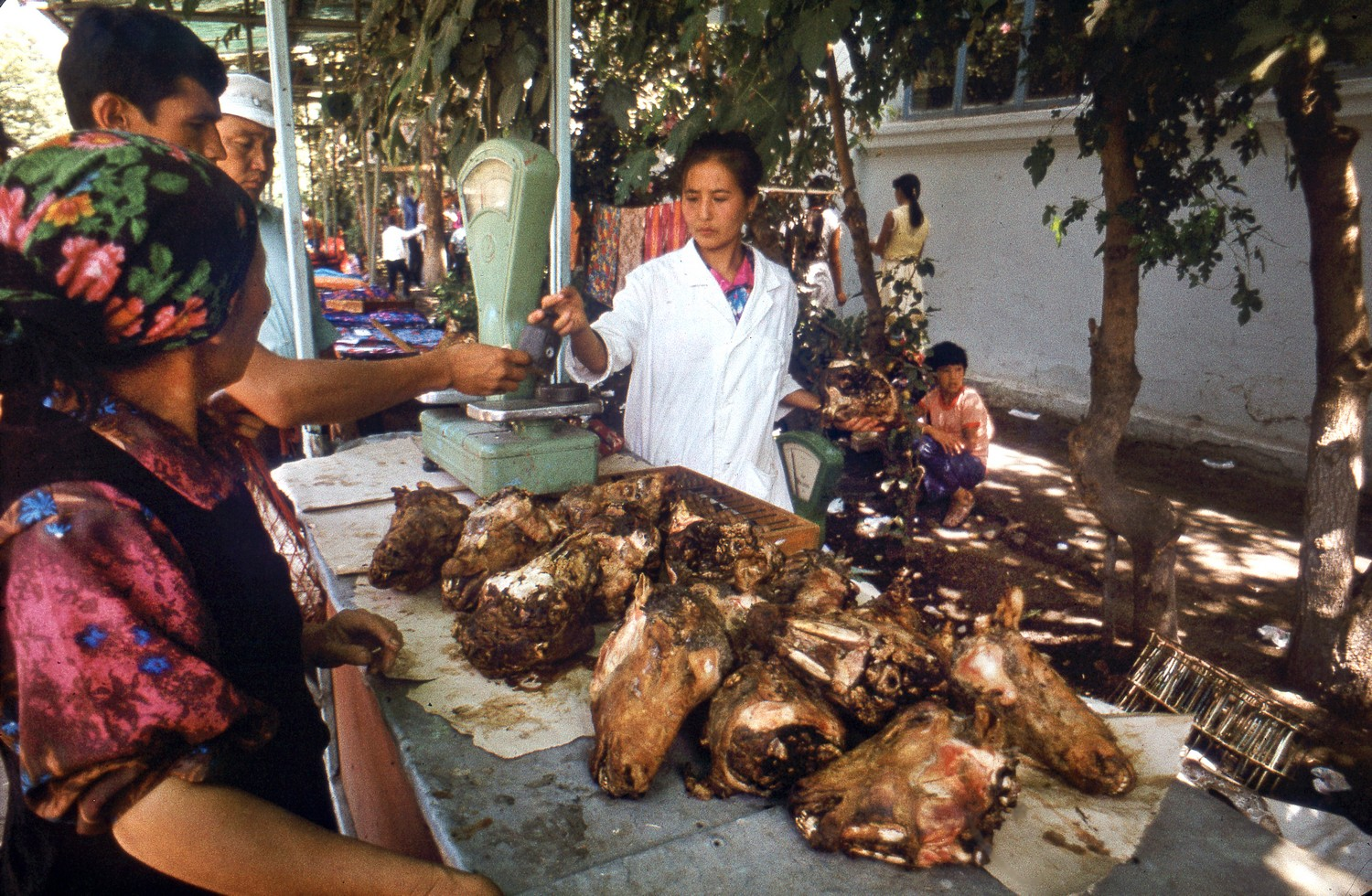
Uzbek people at a market in Khiva, Uzbekistan

The modern Uzbek language is largely derived from the Chagatai language which gained prominence in the Timurid Empire. The position of Chagatai (and later Uzbek) was further strengthened after the fall of the Timurids and the rise of the Shaybanid Uzbek Khaqanate that finally shaped the Turkic language and identity of modern Uzbeks, while the unique grammatical and phonetical features of the Uzbek language as well as the modern Uzbek culture reflect the more ancient Iranian roots of the Uzbek people.

When the Shaybanids – originally Kipchak-speaking Uzbek nomads – conquered Transoxiana (present-day Uzbekistan) in the 16th century and proclaimed the establishment of Khanate of Bukhara, the Shaybanids faced a huge issue, as they were minorities ruling a majority of the population that were Karluk-speaking Turks (closely related to the Uyghurs) and Chagatais (the urban population of the Timurid Empire). The Shaybanids then opted to assimilate with the Karluk majority and eventually adopted the Karluk language; since the 17th century, their elite designation "Uzbek", inherited by the Janid dynasty, also became an ethnic label for the entire region's Turkic-speaking population, enabled the Uzbeks to proclaim themselves heirs of the Timurid civilisation and reconcile with the Timurid-ruling Mughal Empire in India, dissipating any earlier link with the Kipchaks.

Today, approximately 85–90% of Uzbeks speak a Karluk dialect, while minorities in Khorezm and Surxondaryo retain Kipchak or Oghuz dialects.

Although the Timurids were historically enemies of the early Uzbeks, they are both now considered parts of the Uzbek cultural heritage by Majority of Uzbeks, because:

1. Chagatai (the language of the Timurids) is a direct predecessor of Uzbek.
2. Majority of Uzbeks descend from Karluks who lived in the region long before the Shaybanid conquest.
3. The Kipchak Shaybanid's assimilation to wider Karluk identity.

This process shows how a political label ("Uzbek") can evolve into an ethnic identity for a broader population with different origins.

=== Genetic origins ===
Uzbeks share a large portion of their ancestry with nearby Turkic populations, including Kyrgyz people, Uyghurs, Kazakhs, and Bashkirs.

The western ancestry of Uzbeks includes a Caucasus component (≈35–40%), and a (Northern) European component (≈5–20%), the Uzbeks eastern ancestry includes an Eastern Asian component (≈35%), and a (Central and East) Siberian component (≈5–20%). The best proxy for their western ancestry are modern day Abkhaz people, while the best proxy for their eastern ancestry are Yakuts (or alternatively, Tuvans).

A study on modern Central Asians comparing them to ancient historical samples found that Uzbeks can be modeled as 59.1% Iron Age Indo-Iranians, and 40.9% Eastern Steppe Xiongnu, from the Mongolian Plateau.

=== Paternal haplogroups ===
Based on the research of several studies, the paternal lineages of Uzbeks have been described:

- Haplogroup R1a1, a West Eurasian haplogroup, occurs at a rate of 17-32% among Uzbek men, making it the predominant Y-DNA lineage among Uzbeks. It is unclear if this haplogroup in Uzbeks came from local Bronze Age Indo-European pastoralists, or if it originates from Turkic migrants, because despite being considered a diagnostic Indo-Iranian haplogroup, it occurs at a high frequency among Turkic males from Siberia.
- Haplogroup J, a West Eurasian haplogroup, occurs at a rate of 5.9–21.4% in Uzbek males. This haplogroup has been present in the Middle East for tens of thousands of years.
- Haplogroup C2, an East Eurasian haplogroup, occurs at a rate of 4–18% among Uzbek men. In one sample from Afghanistan, 41.2% of Uzbek men carried this haplogroup. Lee & Kuang posit that the males in this sample are descended from the nomadic Uzbeks of the Qipchaq steppe. It is likely that haplogroup C2 was brought to the middle east by Turkic or Mongolic peoples, along with minor Uzbek haplogroups O3 and N.

=== Maternal haplogroups ===
According to a 2010 study, slightly more than 50% of Uzbeks from Tashkent belong to East Eurasian and South Asian maternal haplogroups, while nearly 50% belong to West Eurasian haplogroups.

A majority of Uzbeks from Ferghana belong to East Eurasian and South Asian maternal haplogroups, while considerably fewer belong to West Eurasian haplogroups.

In Khwarazm and Qashqadaryo, a majority of Uzbeks belong to West Eurasian maternal haplogroups, while considerably fewer belong to East Eurasian and South Asian haplogroups.

== History ==
=== Ancient history ===
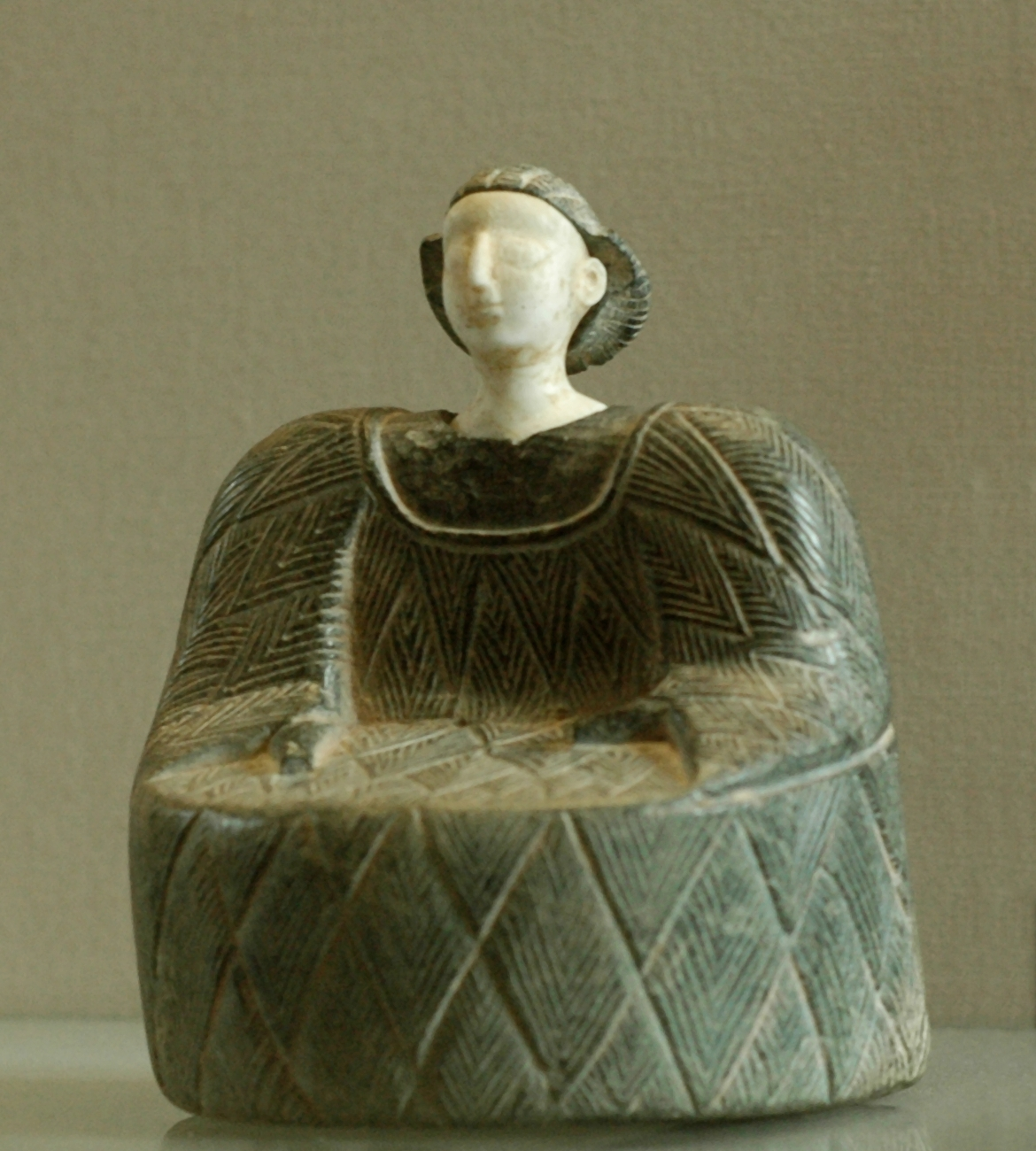
Female statuette bearing the kaunakes. Chlorite and limestone, Bactria, beginning of the 2nd millennium BC.

In the southern part of Central Asia, there was a Bactria–Margiana Archaeological Complex, which has recently been dated to c. 2250–1700 BC. That name is the modern archaeological designation for a Bronze Age civilization of Central Asia, previously dated to c. 2400–1900 BC by Sandro Salvatori.

Iranian nomads arrived from the northern grasslands of what is now Uzbekistan sometime in the first millennium BC. These nomads, who spoke Iranian dialects, settled in Central Asia and began to build an extensive irrigation system along the rivers of the region. At this time, cities such as Bukhara and Samarkand began to appear as centers of government and culture. By the 5th century BC, the Bactrian, Khwarazm, Soghdian, and Tokharian states dominated the region.

Alexander the Great conquered Sogdiana and Bactria in 329 BC, marrying Roxana, daughter of a local Bactrian chieftain. The conquest was supposedly of little help to Alexander as popular resistance was fierce, causing Alexander's army to be bogged down in the region that became the northern part of Hellenistic Greco-Bactrian Kingdom. For many centuries the region of Uzbekistan was ruled by Persian empires, including the Parthian and Sassanid Empires.

In the first centuries, the northern territories of modern Uzbekistan were part of the Kangju nomad state.

With the arrival of the Greeks, writing based on the Greek alphabet began to spread on the territory of Bactria and Sogdiana. As a result of archaeological research on the territory of Sogdiana and Bactria, fragments of pottery with Greek inscriptions have been found.

In 2nd century BC China began to develop its silk trade with the West. Because of this trade on what became known as the Silk Route, Bukhara and Samarkand eventually became extremely wealthy cities, and at times Mawarannahr (Transoxiana) was one of the most influential and powerful Persian provinces of antiquity.

In 350–375 AD, Sogdiana and Tashkent oasis were captured by the nomadic Xionite tribes who arrived from the steppe regions of Central Asia.

=== Turkic Khaganate period ===
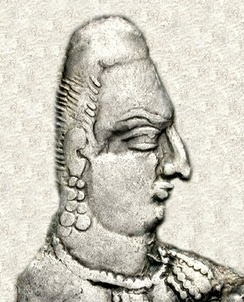
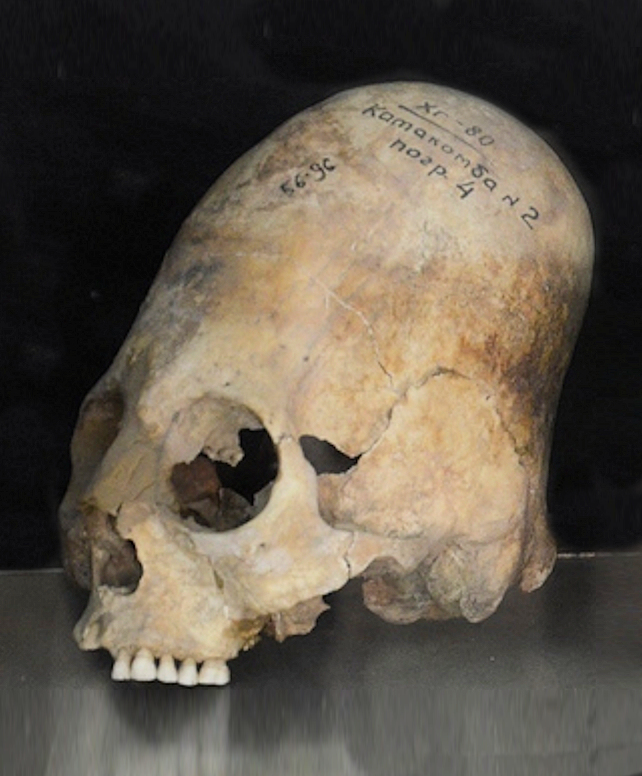
Left: portrait of Alchon king Khingila, from his coinage (circa 450 CE). Right: Elongated skull excavated in Samarkand (dated 600–800 CE), Afrasiab Museum of Samarkand.

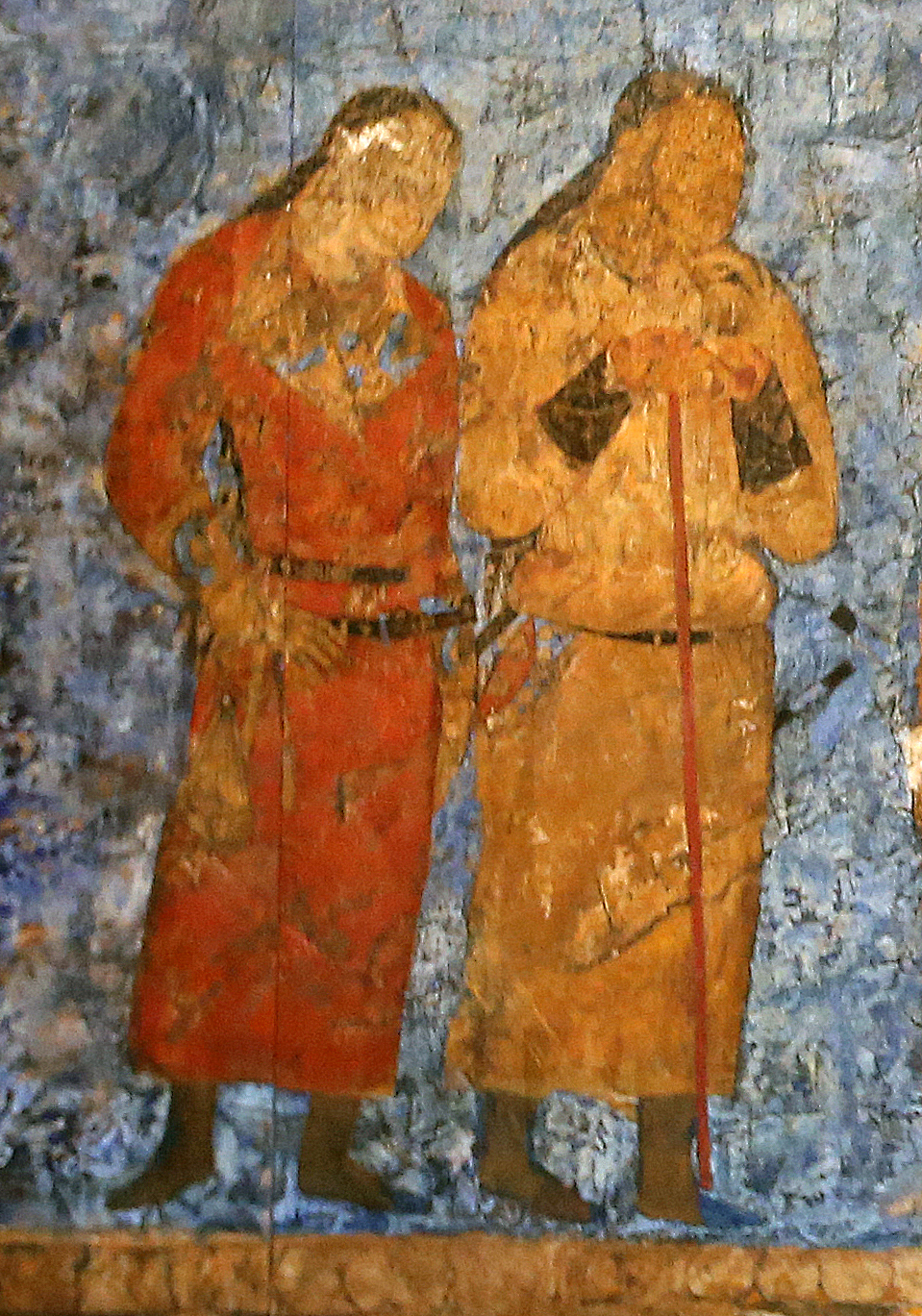
Turkish officers during an audience with king Varkhuman of Samarkand. 648–651 CE, Afrasiyab murals, Samarkand.

The First Turkic Khaganate and migration of the population played a large role in the formation of a sedentary Turkic population in the territory of the oases of Central Asia in the 6th–8th centuries.

In the Western Turkic Khaganate, in addition to various Turkic tribes, there were Iranian nomadic elements, which were gradually assimilated by the Turks. The urban population of Sogd, Khwarazm, Bactria was in close contact with the Turks.

Turkic names and titles are found in Bactrian documents of the 7th–8th centuries: kagan, tapaglig eltabir, tarkhan, tudun, the names Kutlug Tapaglig Bilga savuk, Kara-tongi, Tongaspar, Turkic ethnic names: halach, Turk. During the excavations of the Sogdian Penjikent, a fragment of a draft letter in the Sogdian language was discovered, in the text of which there is a Turkic name Turkash

The Turkic population of the Fergana Valley had their own runic writing. The Turkic rulers of Ferghana, Tokharistan, Bukhara and Chach issued their own coins.

The Turkic population of certain regions of Central Asia in the early Middle Ages had their own urban culture and used the proper Turkic terms, for example, baliq, which meant city.

The Turks had a great influence in the development of the armament of the Sogdians. The Turks are depicted in the wall paintings of ancient Samarkand.

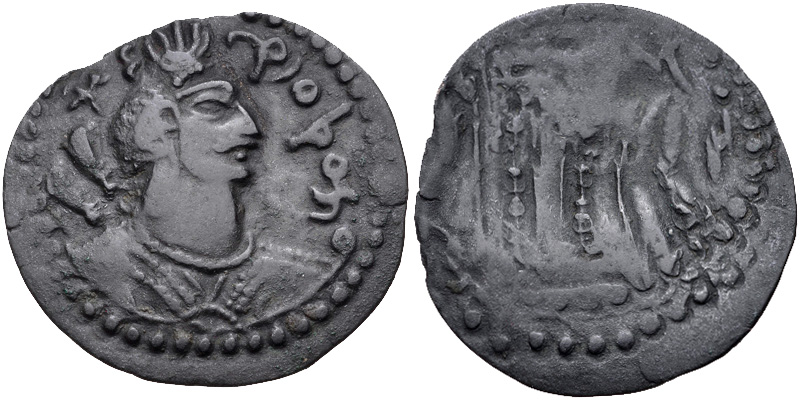
Early coin of Tegin Shah, in the style of the Nezak Huns, whom he displaced. Tokharistan, late 7th century CE.

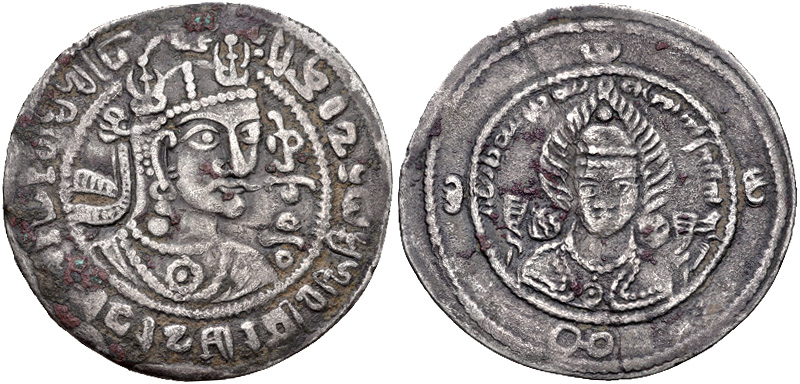
Trilingual coin of Tegin Shah towards the end of his reign. Tokharistan, 728 CE.

=== Early Islamic period ===
The conquest of Central Asia by Muslim Arabs, which was completed in the 8th century AD, brought to the region a new religion that continues to be dominant. The Arabs first invaded Mawarannahr in the middle of the 7th century through sporadic raids during their conquest of Persia. Available sources on the Arab conquest suggest that the Soghdians and other Iranian peoples of Central Asia were unable to defend their land against the Arabs because of internal divisions and the lack of strong indigenous leadership. The Arabs, on the other hand, were led by a brilliant general, Qutaybah ibn Muslim, and were also highly motivated by the desire to spread their new faith, Islam, the official beginning of which was in AD 622. Because of these factors, the population of Mawarannahr was easily subdued. The new religion brought by the Arabs spread gradually into the region. The native religious identities, which in some respects were already being displaced by Persian influences before the Arabs arrived, were further displaced in the ensuing centuries. Nevertheless, the destiny of Central Asia as an Islamic region was firmly established by the Arab victory over the Chinese armies in 750 in a battle at the Talas River.

Despite brief Arab rule, Central Asia successfully retained much of its Iranian characteristic, remaining an important center of culture and trade for centuries after the adoption of the new religion. Mawarannahr continued to be an important political player in regional affairs, as it had been under various Persian dynasties. In fact, the Abbasid Caliphate, which ruled the Arab world for five centuries beginning in 750, was established thanks in great part to assistance from Central Asian supporters in their struggle against the then-ruling Umayyad Caliphate.

During the height of the Abbasid Caliphate in the 8th and 9th centuries, Central Asia and Mawarannahr experienced a truly golden age. Bukhara became one of the leading centers of learning, culture, and art in the Muslim world, its magnificence rivaling contemporaneous cultural centers such as Baghdad, Cairo, and Cordoba. Some of the greatest historians, scientists, and geographers in the history of Islamic culture were natives of the region.

As the Abbasid Caliphate began to weaken and local Islamic Iranian states emerged as the rulers of Iran and Central Asia, the Persian language continued its preeminent role in the region as the language of literature and government. The rulers of the eastern section of Iran and of Mawarannahr were Persians. Under the Samanids and the Buyids, the rich Perso-Islamic culture of Mawarannahr continued to flourish.

=== Samanid Empire, Ghaznavids, and Kara-Khanid Khanate ===
The Samanids were a Persian state that reigned for 180 years, encompassing a vast territoriy stretching from Central Asia to West Asia. The Samanids were descendants of Bahram Chobin, and thus descended from the House of Mihrān, one of the Seven Great Houses of Iran. In governing their territory, the Samanids modeled their state organization after the Abbasids, mirroring the caliph's court and organization. They were rewarded for supporting the Abbasids in Transoxania and Khorasan, and with their established capitals located in Bukhara, Balkh, Samarkand, and Herat, they carved their kingdom after defeating the Saffarids.

The Samanid Empire was the first native Persian dynasty to arise after the Muslim Arab conquest. The four grandsons of the dynasty's founder, Saman Khuda, had been rewarded with provinces for their faithful service to the Abbasid caliph al-Mamun: Nuh obtained Samarkand; Ahmad, Fergana; Yahya, Shash; and Elyas, Herat. Ahmad's son Nasr became governor of Transoxania in 875, but it was his brother and successor, Ismail Samani who overthrew the Saffarids and the Zaydites of Tabaristan, thus establishing a semiautonomous rule over Transoxania and Khorasan, with Bukhara as his capital.

Samanid rule in Bukhara was not formally recognized by the caliph until the early 10th century when the Saffarid ruler 'Amr-i Laith had asked the caliph for the investiture of Transoxiana. The caliph, Al-Mu'tadid however sent the Samanid amir, Ismail Samani, a letter urging him to fight Amr-i Laith and the Saffarids whom the caliph considered usurpers. According to the letter, the caliph stated that he prayed for Ismail who the caliph considered as the rightful ruler of Khorasan. The letter had a profound effect on Ismail, as he was determined to oppose the Saffarids.

Since the 9th century, the Turkization of the population of the Central Asian interfluve has been increasing. At this time, a military system was created, in which the influence of the Turkic military was strong.

In the 9th century, the continued influx of nomads from the northern steppes brought a new group of people into Central Asia. These people were the Turks who lived in the great grasslands stretching from Mongolia to the Caspian Sea. Introduced mainly as slave soldiers to the Samanid dynasty, these Turks served in the armies of all the states of the region, including the Abbasid army. In the late 10th century, as the Samanids began to lose control of Transoxiana (Mawarannahr) and northeastern Iran, some of these soldiers came to positions of power in the government of the region, and eventually established their own states, albeit highly Persianized. With the emergence of a Turkic ruling group in the region, other Turkic tribes began to migrate to Transoxiana.

The first of the Turkic states in the region was the Persianate Ghaznavid Empire, established in the last years of the 10th century. The Ghaznavid state, which captured Samanid domains south of the Amu Darya, was able to conquer large areas of Iran, Afghanistan, and northern India apart from Central Asia, during the reign of Sultan Mahmud. The Ghaznavids were closely followed by the Turkic Qarakhanids, who took the Samanid capital Bukhara in 999 AD, and ruled Transoxiana for the next two centuries. Samarkand was made the capital of the Western Qarakhanid state.

According to Peter Golden, the Karakhanid state was one of the first Turkic-Islamic states. The Islamization of the Karakhanids and their Turkic subjects played an important role in the cultural development of the Turkic culture. In the late 10th–early 11th century for the first time in the history of the Turkic peoples, Tafsir (commentary on the Koran) was translated into the Turkic language.

The founder of the Western Karakhanid Kaganate, Ibrahim Tamgach Khan (1040–1068), for the first time erected a madrasah in Samarkand with state funds and supported the development of culture in the region. One of the famous scholars was the historian Majid ad-din al-Surkhakati, who in Samarkand wrote the "History of Turkestan", which outlined the history of the Karakhanid dynasty.

The most striking monument of the Karakhanid era in Samarkand was the palace of Ibrahim ibn Hussein (1178–1202), which was built in the citadel in the 12th century, where fragments of monumental painting depicting a Turkic ruler were discovered.

The dominance of Ghazna was curtailed, however, when the Seljuks led themselves into the western part of the region, conquering the Ghaznavid territory of Khorazm (also spelled Khorezm and Khwarazm). The Seljuks also defeated the Qarakhanids, but did not annex their territories outright. Instead they made the Qarakhanids a vassal state. The Seljuks dominated a wide area from Asia Minor to the western sections of Transoxiana in the 11th century. The Seljuk Empire then split into states ruled by various local Turkic and Iranian rulers. The culture and intellectual life of the region continued unaffected by such political changes, however. Turkic tribes from the north continued to migrate into the region during this period. The power of the Seljuks however became diminished when the Seljuk Sultan Ahmed Sanjar was defeated by the Kara-Khitans at the Battle of Qatwan in 1141.

Turkic words and terms characteristic of the literature of the 11th century are used in the modern Bukhara dialect of the Uzbeks.

In the late 12th century, a Turkic leader of Khorazm, which is the region south of the Aral Sea, united Khorazm, Transoxiana, and Iran under his rule. Under the rule of the Khorazm shah Kutbeddin Muhammad and his son, Muhammad II, Transoxiana continued to be prosperous and rich while maintaining the region's Perso-Islamic identity. However, a new incursion of nomads from the north soon changed this situation. This time the invader was Genghis Khan with his Mongol armies.

=== Mongol period ===
The Mongol invasion of Central Asia is one of the turning points in the history of the region. The Mongols had such a lasting impact because they established the tradition that the legitimate ruler of any Central Asian state could only be a blood descendant of Genghis Khan.

The Mongol conquest of Central Asia, which took place from 1219 to 1225, led to a wholesale change in the population of Mawarannahr. The conquest quickened the process of Turkification in some parts of the region because, although the armies of Genghis Khan were led by Mongols, they were made up mostly of Turkic tribes that had been incorporated into the Mongol armies as the tribes were encountered in the Mongols' southward sweep. As these armies settled in Mawarannahr, they intermixed with the local populations which did not flee. Another effect of the Mongol conquest was the large-scale damage the soldiers inflicted on cities such as Bukhara and on regions such as Khorazm. As the leading province of a wealthy state, Khorazm was treated especially severely. The irrigation networks in the region suffered extensive damage that was not repaired for several generations. Many Iranian-speaking populations were forced to flee southwards in order to avoid persecution.

Following the death of Genghis Khan in 1227, his empire was divided among his four sons and his family members. Despite the potential for serious fragmentation, Mongol law of the Mongol Empire maintained orderly succession for several more generations, and control of most of Mawarannahr stayed in the hands of direct descendants of Chaghatai, the second son of Genghis. Orderly succession, prosperity, and internal peace prevailed in the Chaghatai lands, and the Mongol Empire as a whole remained strong and united.

=== Rule of Timur and Timurids ===
In the early 14th century, however, as the empire began to break up into its constituent parts, the Chaghatai territory also was disrupted as the princes of various tribal groups competed for influence. One tribal chieftain, Timur (Tamerlane), emerged from these struggles in the 1380s as the dominant force in Mawarannahr. Although he was not a descendant of Genghis, Timur became the de facto ruler of Mawarannahr and proceeded to conquer all of western Central Asia, Iran, the Caucasus, Asia Minor, and the southern steppe region north of the Aral Sea. He also invaded Russia before dying during an invasion of China in 1405.

Timur initiated the last flowering of Mawarannahr by gathering in his capital, Samarkand, numerous artisans and scholars from the lands he had conquered. By supporting such people, Timur imbued his empire with a very rich Perso-Islamic culture. During Timur's reign and the reigns of his immediate descendants, a wide range of religious and palatial construction projects were undertaken in Samarkand and other population centers. Timur also patronized scientists and artists; his grandson Ulugh Beg was one of the world's first great astronomers. It was during the Timurid dynasty that Turkic, in the form of the Chaghatai dialect, became a literary language in its own right in Mawarannahr, although the Timurids were Persianate in nature. The greatest Chaghataid writer, Ali Shir Nava'i, was active in the city of Herat, now in northwestern Afghanistan, in the second half of the 15th century.

The Timurids supported the development of literature in the Turkic language. In 1398, Timur's son Miranshah ordered to draw up an official document in the Turkic language in the Uyghur script.

Timur's grandson Iskandar Sultan had a court that included a group of poets, for example, Mir Khaidar, whom Iskandar encouraged to write poetry in the Turkic language. Thanks to the patronage of Iskandar Sultan, the Turkic poem "Gul and Navruz" was written.

The Timurid state quickly broke into two halves after the death of Timur. The chronic internal fighting of the Timurids attracted the attention of the Eastern Kipchak-speaking nomadic tribes called Taza Uzbeks who were living to the north of the Aral Sea. In 1501, the Uzbeks began a wholesale invasion of Mawarannahr. Under the leadership of Muhammad Shaybani, the Uzbeks conquered the key cities of Samarkand and Herat in 1505 and 1507, respectively, and founded the Khanate of Bukhara.

=== Uzbek period ===
Shaybani Khan, 1507

By 1510, the Uzbeks had completed their conquest of Central Asia, including the territory of the present-day Uzbekistan. Of the states they established, the most powerful, the Khanate of Bukhara, centered on the city of Bukhara. The khanate controlled Mawarannahr, especially the region of Tashkent, the Fergana Valley in the east, and northern Afghanistan. A second Uzbek state, the Khanate of Khiva was established in the oasis of Khorazm at the mouth of the Amu Darya. The Khanate of Bukhara was initially led by the energetic Shaybanid dynasty, the successors of Muhammad Shaybani. The Shaybanids initially competed against Iran for a few years, which was led by the Safavid dynasty, for the rich far-eastern territory of present-day Iran. The struggle with the Safavids also had a religious aspect, because the Uzbeks were Sunni Muslims while Iran was Shia.

Shaybani Khan wrote poetry under the pseudonym "Shibani". A collection of poems by Shaybani Khan, written in the Central Asian Turkic literary language, is currently kept in the Topkapi manuscript collection in Istanbul. The manuscript of his philosophical and religious work: "Bahr ul-Khudo", written in the Central Asian Turkic literary language in 1508, is located in London.

Shaybani-khan's nephew Ubaydulla Khan was a very educated person, he skillfully recited the Koran and provided it with commentaries in the Turkic language. Ubaydulla himself wrote poetry in Turkic, Persian and Arabic under the literary pseudonym Ubaydiy. A collection of his poems has reached us.

The term "92 Uzbek tribes", which appeared in the fifteenth-century Dasht-i Qipchaq, began to be used with a variety of meanings in the following centuries depending on the political and cultural context. Near the end of the 16th century, the Uzbek states of Bukhara and Khorazm began to weaken because of their endless wars against each other and the Persians and because of strong competition for the throne among the khans in power and their heirs. At the beginning of the 17th century, the Shaybanid dynasty was replaced by the Janid dynasty.

Another factor contributing to the weakness of the Uzbek khanates in this period was the general decline of trade moving through the region. This change had begun in the previous century when ocean trade routes were established from Europe to India and China, circumventing the Silk Route. As European-dominated ocean transport expanded and some trading centers were destroyed, cities such as Bukhara, Merv, and Samarkand in the Khanate of Bukhora and Khiva and Urganch (Urgench) in Khorazm began to steadily decline.

The Uzbeks' struggle with Iran also led to the cultural isolation of Central Asia from the rest of the Islamic world. In addition to these problems, the struggle with the nomads from the northern steppe continued. In the 17th and 18th centuries, Kazakh nomads and Mongols continually raided the Uzbek khanates, causing widespread damage and disruption. In the beginning of the 18th century, the Khanate of Bukhara lost the fertile Fergana region, and a new Uzbek khanate was formed in Quqon.

=== Afghan Pashtun conquest ===
An Afghani Uzbek Khanate existed in Maimana. The Pashtuns battled and conquered the Uzbeks and forced them into a state of subjugation and discrimination. Out of anti-Russian strategic interests, the British assisted the Afghan conquest of the Uzbek Khanates. The British gave weapons to the Afghans and backed the Afghan colonization of northern Afghanistan, which involved sending a huge number of Pashtun colonists onto Uzbek land. Furthermore, British literature from the period demonized the Uzbeks. Soviet-era arrivals in Afghanistan from Uzbekistan are referred to as Jogi.

=== Russian Empire ===
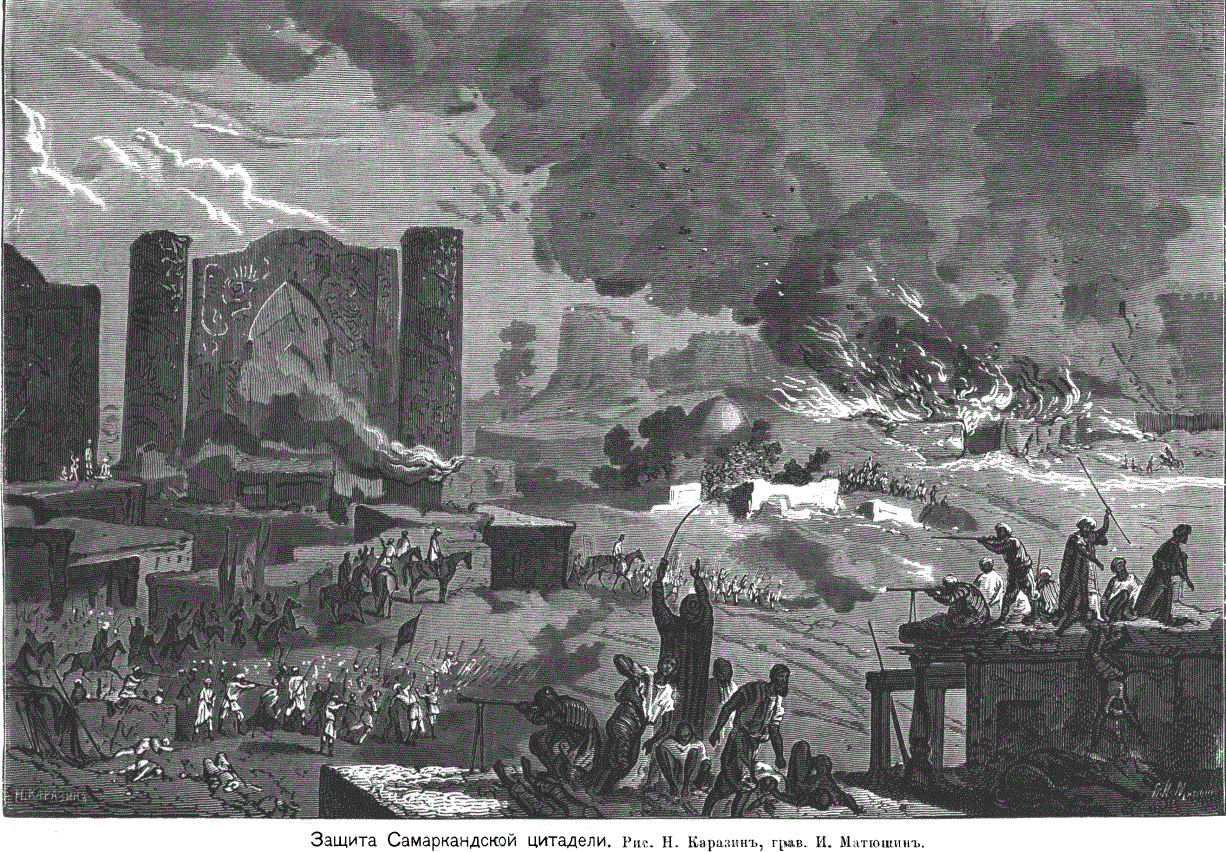
The Defence of the Samarkand Citadel in 1868. From the Russian Illustrated Magazine "Niva" (1872).

In the 19th century, Russian interest in the area increased greatly, sparked by nominal concern over British designs on Central Asia; by anger over the situation of Russian citizens held as slaves; and by the desire to control the trade in the region and to establish a secure source of cotton for Russia. When the United States Civil War prevented cotton delivery from Russia's primary supplier, the southern United States, Central Asian cotton assumed much greater importance for Russia.

As soon as the Russian conquest of the Caucasus was completed in the late 1850s, the Russian Ministry of War began to send military forces against the Central Asian khanates. Three major population centers of the khanates—Tashkent, Bukhara, and Samarkand—were captured in 1865, 1867, and 1868, respectively. In 1868 the Khanate of Bukhara signed a treaty with Russia making Bukhara a Russian protectorate. Khiva became a Russian protectorate in 1873, and the Khanat of Kokand finally was incorporated into the Russian Empire, also as a protectorate, in 1876.

By 1876, Russia had incorporated all three khanates (hence all of present-day Uzbekistan) into its empire, granting the khanates limited autonomy. In the second half of the 19th century, the Russian population of Uzbekistan grew and some industrialization occurred. The Jadidists engaged in educational reform among Muslims of Central Asia. To escape Russians slaughtering them in 1916, Uzbeks escaped to China.

=== Soviet Union ===
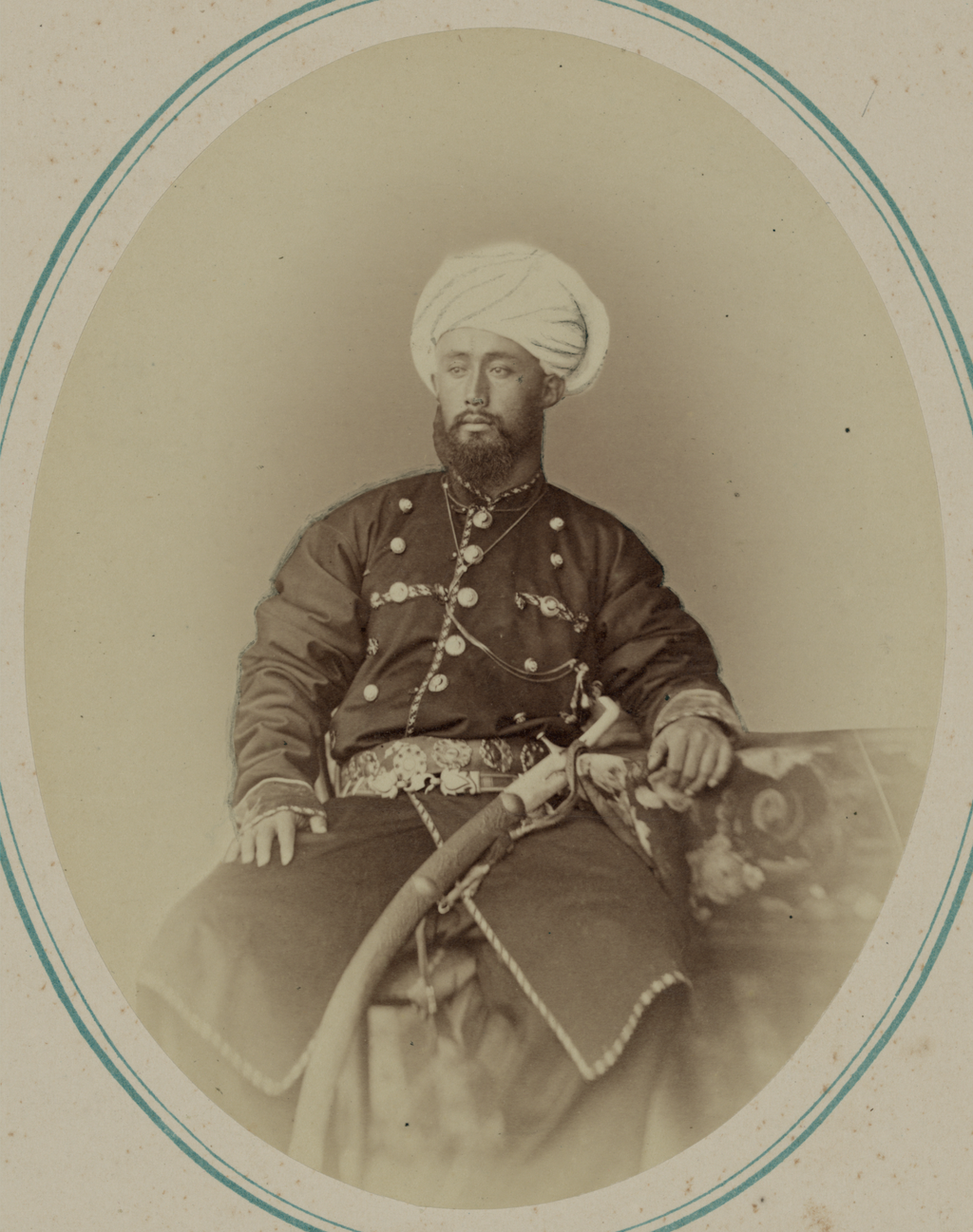
Uzbek Mulla Dzhan Turdi Ali, uncle of the Kokand Khan's older son, 19th century

In the 1940s, Nazi Germany invaded the Soviet Union. In response, many Central Asians, including Uzbeks or Samarkandites, were sent to fight the Germans in the area of Smolensk. However, a number of them, including Hatam Kadirov and Zair Muratov, were captured, transported to the Netherlands, where they were abused and killed. Their bodies were buried in Rusthof cemetery near Amersfoort. For some time, these 101 victims were not identified, apart from the fact that they were Soviets, until an investigation by journalist Remco Reiding. Their plight was also studied by Uzbek historian Bahodir Uzakov of Gouda, South Holland. Witness Henk Broekhuizen said that, despite having seeing them once as a teenager, he would recall the soldiers' faces, whenever he closed his eyes.

Moscow's control over Uzbekistan weakened in the 1970s as Uzbek party leader Sharaf Rashidov brought many cronies and relatives into positions of power. In the mid-1980s, Moscow attempted to regain control by again purging the entire Uzbek party leadership. However, this move increased Uzbek nationalism, which had long resented Soviet policies such as the imposition of cotton monoculture and the suppression of Islamic traditions. In the late 1980s, the liberalized atmosphere of the Soviet Union under Mikhail S. Gorbachev (in power 1985–91) fostered political opposition groups and open (albeit limited) opposition to Soviet policy in Uzbekistan. In 1989, a series of violent ethnic clashes, involving Uzbeks, brought the appointment of ethnic Uzbek outsider Islam Karimov as Communist Party chief.

=== Post-Soviet era ===
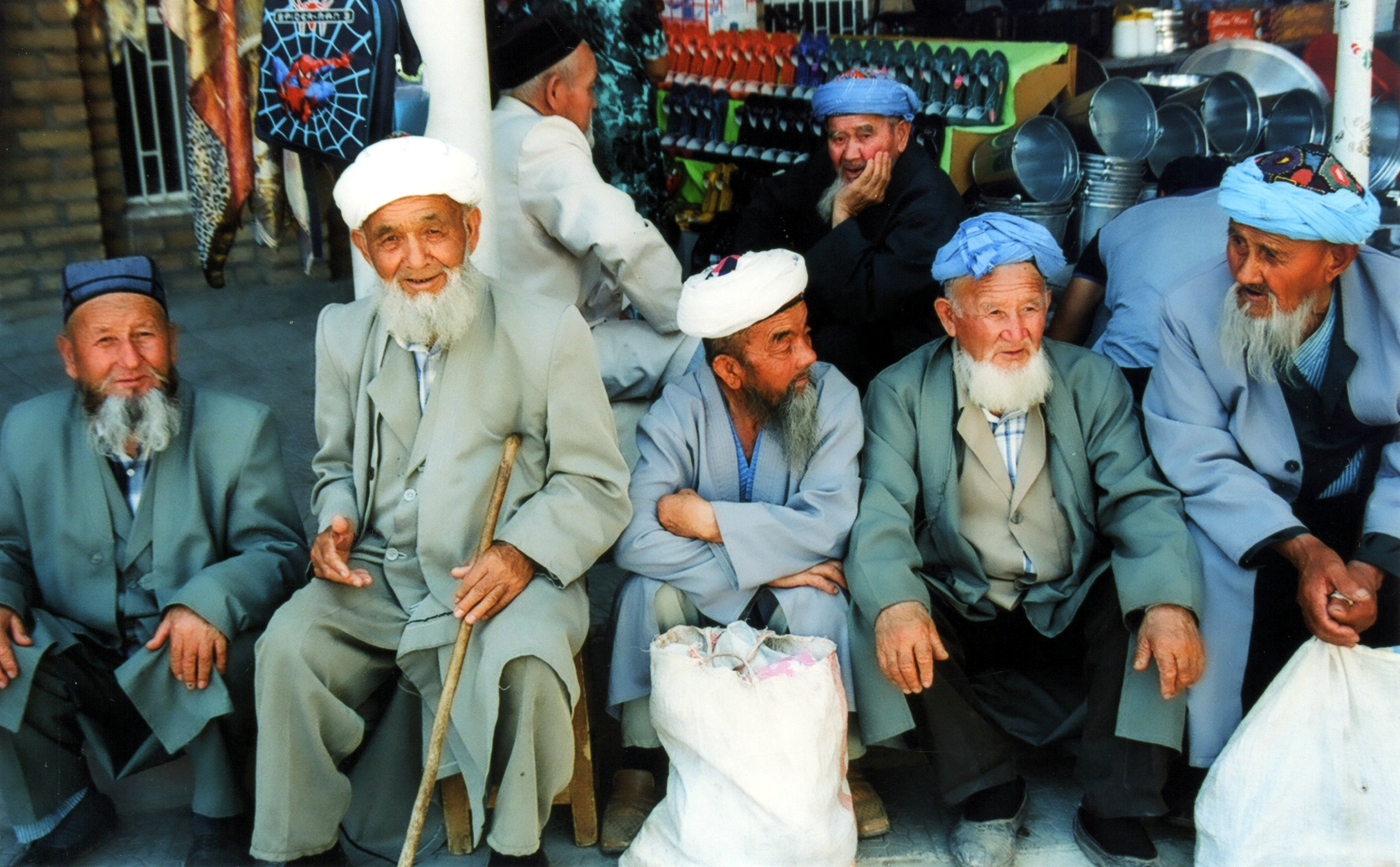
Uzbek elders

When the Supreme Soviet of Uzbekistan reluctantly approved independence from the Soviet Union in 1991, Karimov became president of the Republic of Uzbekistan. On August 31, 1991, Uzbekistan declared independence, marking September 1 as a national holiday.

== Uzbek diaspora ==
Dissident Islamist and anti-Soviet Central Asians fled to Afghanistan, British India, and to the Hijaz in Saudi Arabia. The last Emir of Bukhara Mohammed Alim Khan fled to Afghanistan. The Islamist Uzbek As-Sayyid Qāsim bin Abd al-Jabbaar Al-Andijaani (Arabic: السيد قاسم بن عبد الجبار الأنديجاني) was born in Fergana valley's Andijan city in Turkestan (Central Asia). He went to British India was educated at Darul Uloom Deoband, and then returned to Turkestan where he preached against Communist Russian rule. He then fled to Afghanistan, then to British India and then to Hijaz where he continued his education in Mecca and Medina and wrote several works on Islam and engaged in anti-Soviet activities.

In the recent times, many Uzbeks started to migrate to various countries as labour migrants, especially to Russia, South Korea, the UAE, Germany, Poland, Saudi Arabia, etc.

=== Afghanistan ===
Uzbeks are one of major ethnic groups in Afghanistan, being country's third or fourth largest ethnicity, after Pashtuns, Tajiks and Hazaras. They are mainly based in northern Afghanistan, in the provinces bordering Uzbekistan and Turkmenistan; this region is also known as Afghan Turkestan.

=== China ===
Uzbeks are one of the 56 officially recognized ethnic groups in China. The total population of China's Uzbeks in 2021 was 12,742, scattered in Yining, Tacheng, Ürümqi, and Yarkant in Xinjiang. Most of them live in urban areas and a few in rural areas. The Danangou Uzbek Township, located in Changji Hui Autonomous Prefecture, is the only township designated for Uzbeks in China. The Uzbeks in southern Xinjiang speak Uyghur because they have lived amongst the Uyghurs for a long time, and the Uzbeks in the pastoral areas of northern Xinjiang speak Kazakh.

=== Kyrgyzstan ===
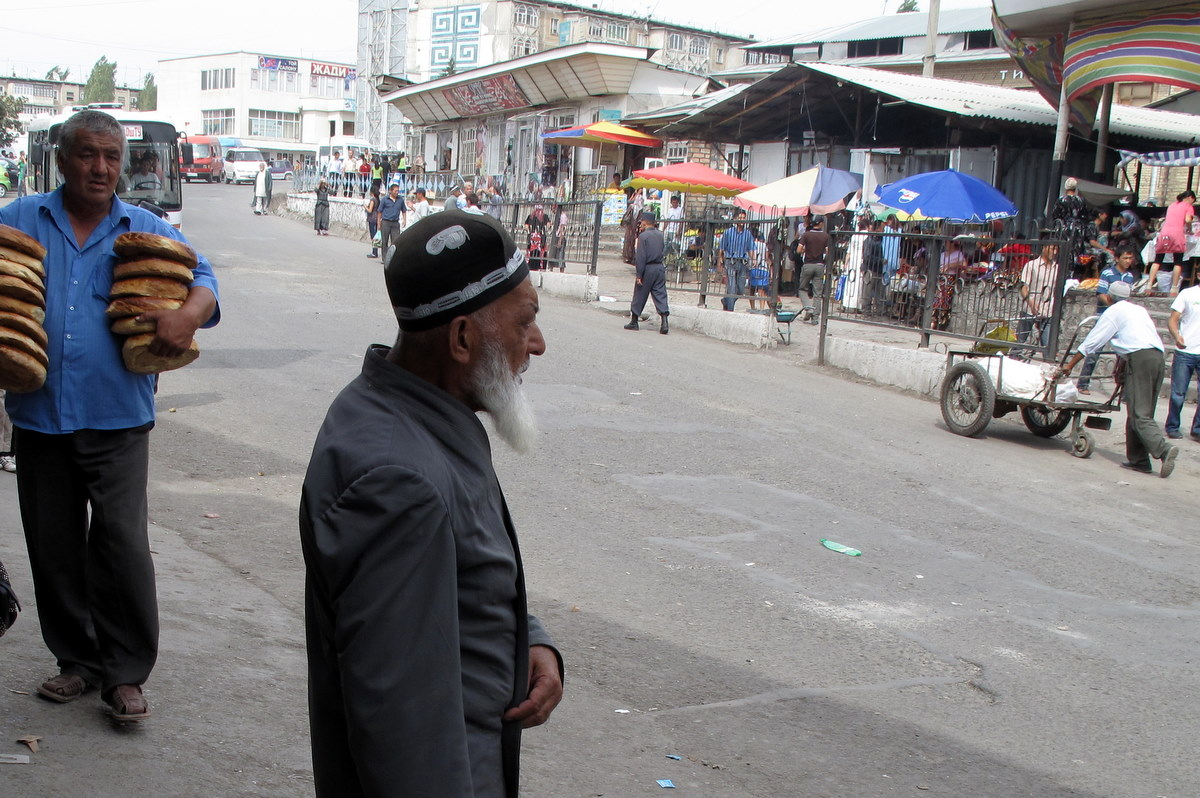
An elderly Uzbek man in bazaar in Osh, Kyrgyzstan

Uzbeks in Kyrgyzstan are an ethnic group native to Kyrgyzstan. In Kyrgyzstan, Uzbeks are the largest minority group, comprising about 15% of the population. They have a long history in the region and have played a significant role in the culture and economy of Kyrgyzstan. Many Uzbeks in Kyrgyzstan live in the southern part of the country, particularly in the cities of Osh, Jalal-Abad and Özgön.

=== Pakistan ===
Many ethnic Uzbeks moved from Afghanistan to Pakistan owing to the Afghan War. Due to aid requirements for refugees, repatriation of camp dwellers took place. In the 1800s, Konya's north Bogrudelik was settled by Tatar Bukharlyks. In 1981, many Uzbek refugees in Pakistan moved to Turkey to join the existing Kayseri, İzmir, Ankara, and Zeytinburnu-based communities.

=== Russia ===
Uzbeks represent a significant diaspora in the Russian Federation, numbering 300,000 as of January 2016. Most Uzbeks living in Russia are seasonal migrant workers. Most have arrived after the dissolution of the Soviet Union. Due to cultural differences, they are one of the most discriminated-against minorities in Russia, and hence rarely settle outside of the Russian capital, Moscow.

=== Saudi Arabia ===
Uzbek exiles in Saudi Arabia from Soviet ruled Central Asia also adopted the identity "Turkistani". A lot of them are also called "Bukhari". A number of Saudi "Uzbeks" do not consider themselves as Uzbek and instead consider themselves as Muslim Turkestanis. Many Uzbeks in Saudi Arabia adopted the Arabic nisba of their home city in Uzbekistan, such as Al Bukhari from Bukhara, Al Samarqandi from Samarkand, Al Tashkandi from Tashkent, Al Andijani from Andijan, Al Kokandi from Kokand, Al Turkistani from Turkistan. Bukhari and Turkistani were labels for all the Uzbeks in general while specific names for Uzbeks from different places were Farghani, Marghilani, Namangani, and Kokandi. Kokandi was used to refer to Uzbeks from Ferghana.

Shami Domullah introduced Salafism to Soviet Central Asia. Mosques in Uzbekistan are funded by Saudi-based Uzbeks. Saudis have tried to propagate their version of Islam into Uzbekistan following the collapse of the Soviet Union. Saudi Arabia's "Bukharian brethren" were led by Nuriddin al-Bukhari as of 1990. Official figures have placed anywhere between 400 thousand to 800 thousand Uzbeks in Saudi Arabia.

=== Turkey ===
Like the Turks, Uzbeks are Turkic-speaking and also profess Islam. The number of the Uzbek diaspora in Turkey is approximately 70,000 people, Uzbeks live in almost all regions and large cities of the country.

== Culture and society ==
=== Uzbek tribes ===
Uzbeks are said to have included 92 tribes in their orbit: Manghut, Qiyat, Qipchaq, Khitai, Qanghli, Kenigas, Durman, Darghut, Shoran, Shurin, Toma, Bahrin, Giray, Aghrikur, Anghit, Barkut, Tubin, Sart, Romdan, Matin, Busa, Yojqar, Qilwa, Dojar, Jurat, Qurlat, Mehdi, Kilaj, Sakhtiyon, Qirgh, Ming, Yuz, Salor, Loqai, Qushchi, Kerait, Chaqmok, Utarchi, Turcoman, Arlot, Kait, Qirghuz, Qalon, Ushin, Ormaq, Chubi, Lechi, Qari, Moghol, Hafiz dad Kaln, Belad Bustan, Quchi, Qataghan, Barlas, Yabu, Jalair, Musit, Naiman, Semarjiq, Qarluq, Arghun, Oklan, Qalmaq, Fuladchi, Jalot Uljin or Olchin, Chimbay, Tilab, Machar or Majar, Ojinbai, Badai, Kelchi, Ilaj, Jebirgan, Botiya, Timan, Yankuz, Tatar, Uighur, Baghlan or Baghan, Danghut, Manghut, Shagird, Pesha, Tushlub, Onli, Biyat, Ozlaji, Joslayi, Tuwadiq, and Ghariband Jit. For the semi-nomadic tribes of these khanates, belonging to the "92 tribes" meant in certain cases a privileged position and a higher socio-economic status. In certain cases, the term "92 Uzbek tribes" was used with a political meaning to legitimize the ruling Uzbek dynasties of the Manghyts and Mings.

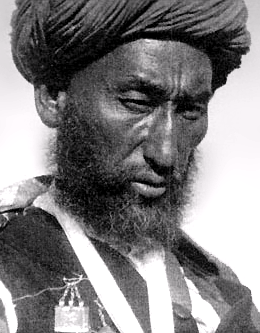
Ibrahim Bek, Islamist leader against the Soviet Union, in 1920.

=== Language ===
The Uzbek language is a Turkic language of the Karluk branch. Modern Uzbek is written in wide variety of scripts including Arabic, Latin, and Cyrillic. After the independence of Uzbekistan from the former Soviet Union, the government decided to replace the Cyrillic script with a modified Latin alphabet, specifically for Turkic languages. Historically, the nomadic Uzbeks who founded the Uzbek Khanate and its other successor states spoke various dialects of Turkic language.

=== Religion ===
Uzbeks come from a predominantly Sunni Muslim background, usually of the Hanafi school, but variations exist between northern and southern Uzbeks. According to a 2009 Pew Research Center report, Uzbekistan's population is 96.3% Muslim, around 54% identifies as non-denominational Muslim, 18% as Sunni and 1% as Shia. And around 11% say they belong to a Sufi order. The majority of Uzbeks from the former USSR came to practice religion with a more liberal interpretation due to the movement of Jadidism which arose as an indigenous reform movement during the time of Russian imperial rule, while Uzbeks in Afghanistan and other countries to the south have remained more conservative adherents of Islam. However, with Uzbek independence in 1991 came an Islamic revival amongst segments of the population. People living in the area of modern Uzbekistan were first converted to Islam as early as the 8th century, as Arabs conquered the area, displacing the earlier faiths of the region.

A 2015 study estimates some 10,000 Muslim Uzbek converted to Christianity, most of them belonging to some sort of evangelical or charismatic Protestant community. According to 2009 national census 1,794 Uzbeks in Kazakhstan are Christians. In Russia there are some long-term Uzbek workers who have converted to Eastern Orthodoxy through missionaries.

Historically, Uzbek Shia Muslims were rare. Some Uzbek tribes, particularly in Khurasan and Herat, converted to Shia Islam during the late 16th and early 17th centuries. In 1990, Olivier Roy wrote that the Uzbek Shias of Jowzjamn and Faryab often concealed their religious identity due to Sunni dominance and marginalization. Shia Uzbeks in Afghanistan had good relations with their Hazara neighbors. In Uzbekistan, after independence from the Soviets, the state tightly regulated Hanafi Sunni Islam and restricted all other forms of Islam. Furthermore, the majority of Shias in Uzbekistan were ethnic Tajiks rather than Uzbeks. The lack of institutional support and the social dominance of Sunni clerical networks made it difficult for any Shia Uzbek identity to flourish.

The ancient pre-Islamic religion of Uzbekistan-Zoroastrianism survives today and is followed by 7,000 people in Uzbekistan. According to 2009 national census 1,673 Uzbeks in Kazakhstan are atheists.

=== Attire ===
==== Male clothing ====
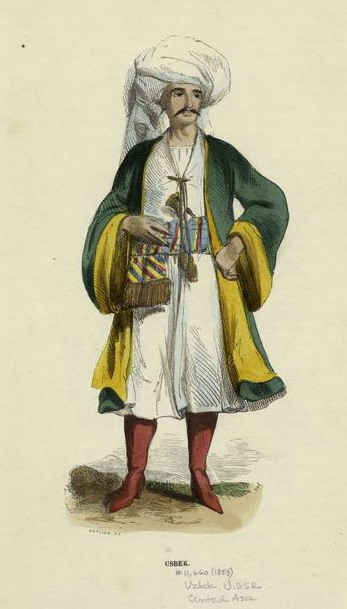
Traditional Uzbek costume circa 1840.

Uzbek clothing includes a loose-fitting cotton coat, called Chapan or Kaftan, which is usually made from a variety of colorful stripes, or other types of patterns. The chapan is usually of knee length, and includes different elements in various regions of the country. The botton of the sleeves, center edges, hem and neckline of the coat were sown with a decorative braid, which was believed to protect from "evil powers". In the past, wearing two or more coats at the same time, both in winter and summer, was seen as a status symbol, and indicated a certain level of prestige for the family.

Shirts are white and wide, made of cotton, and usually worn underneath the coat. Some of them have patterns on the sleeves and the neckline, called jiyak. Pants, also known as ishton, are loosely cut, but narrow to the bottom, and are tucked into soft leather boots with pointed toes, for the ease of horse riding.

The coat or the shirt is often tied with a folded handlerchief or a band belbog. The band is viewed as an important accessory, and can be made of fine fabrics and silks, decorated with intricate silver embroidery, and fitted with little bags for tobacco and keys. Traditionally, a hand crafted knife is placed in the band, known as pichoq, Chust made knives are famous in particular.

==== Female clothing ====
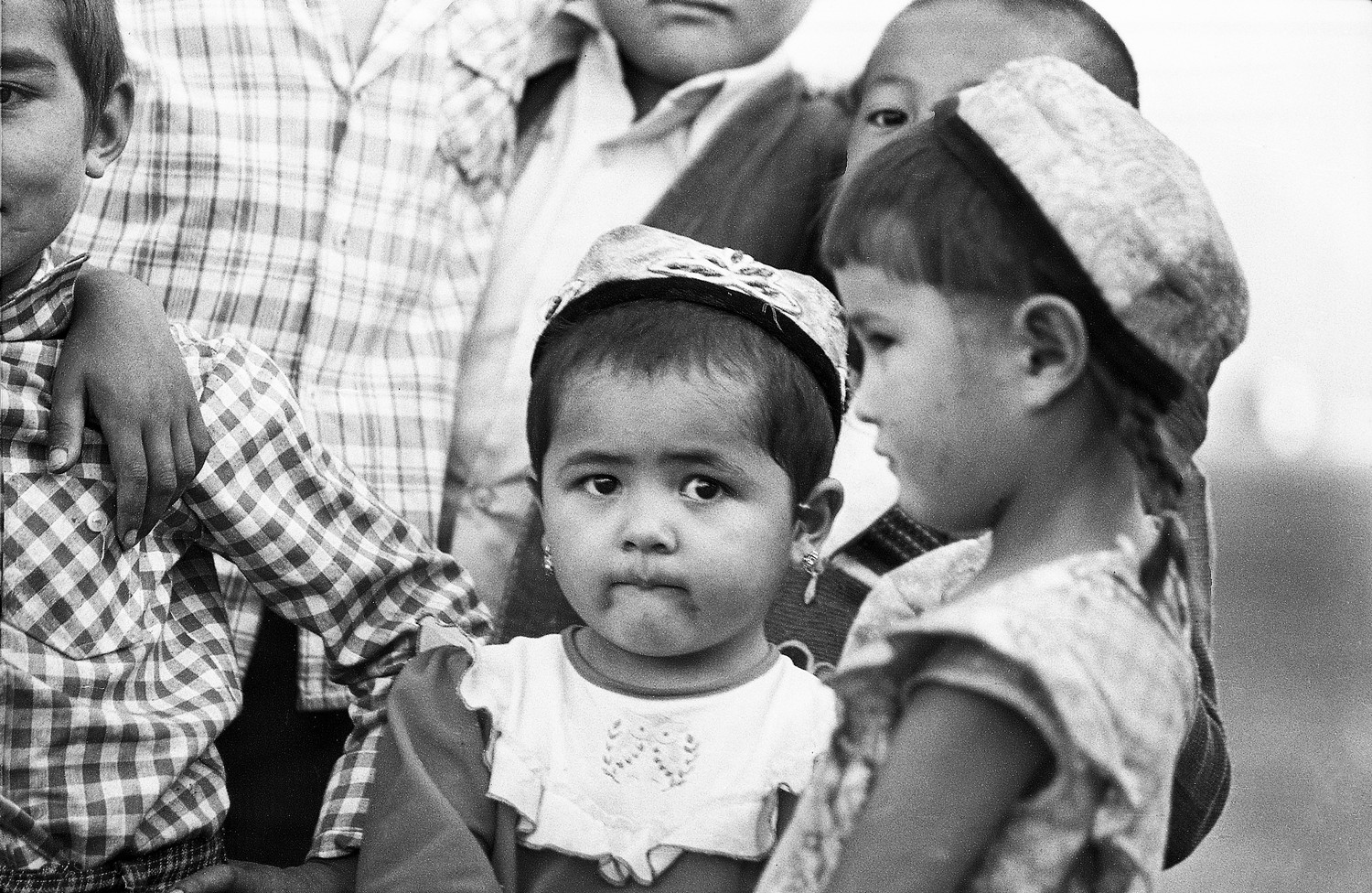
Uzbek children, in traditional clothing 19th–20th century.

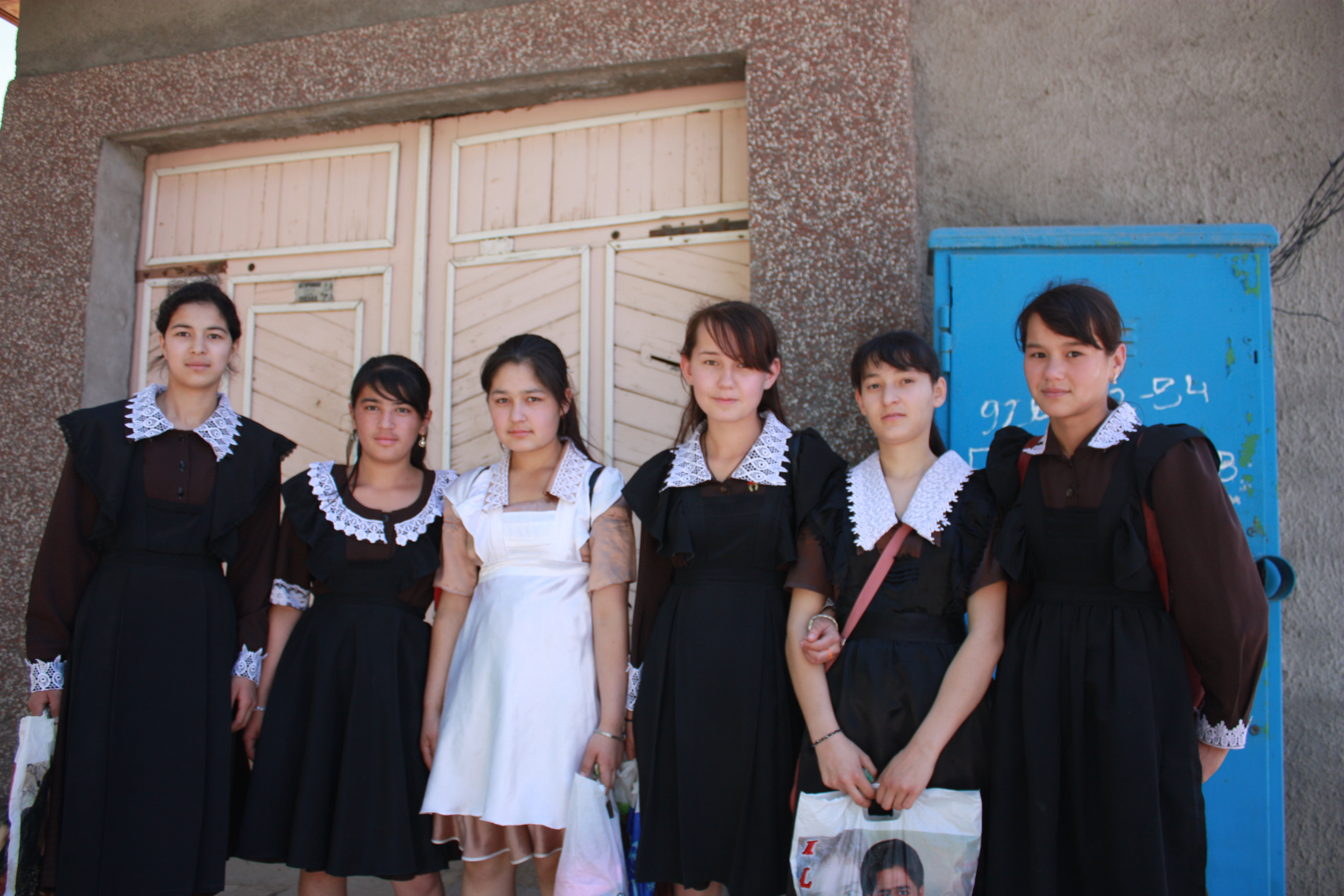
Women in school uniform, Samarkand, 2008.

The female version of the attire consists of a traditional robe, functional dress made of satin, and lozim – wide, light, light trousers narrowing in the lower parts. The long, loose tunic has wide sleeves, reaching down to the wrists. The loose-cut pants, are made to match the tunic, and thus are usually made of the same fabric, or one completely to the tunic. The bottom of the pants is gathered and decorated with embroidered braid. The coats, are in many ways similar to the chapan worn by males, and are made of various fabrics, such as atlas, khan-atlas, bekasama, alacha and kalami. Textile patterns are brightly colored in the shades of yellow, blue, green, violet, and orange, and often include up to six or seven different colors in various floral and/or geometrical designs.

In the past, color of the costume was an important signal of a person's age or social status. Notably, red and pink were common for girls and young women, whereas middle-aged women wore shades of light blue and gray. White however, was appropriate for all ages, especially the elderly, and is used widely to this day.

Before the Bolshevik Revolution and the subsequent establishment of communism in Central Asia, women wore traditional veils, known as parandga, on all occasions in public. The designs were varied, some adhering to one or two basic colors in their designs, while others included colored floral or geometrical elements, with the face-lid, usually being made of black fabric. The face-lid could be lifted back, for ease of communication.

However, after the establishment of communism, a movement to liberate women from the "patriarchal" and "outdated" practice of wearing veils, known as Hujum, gained track, and in the 20s and early 30s, public abandonments and burnings of veils were encouraged. The result was a conservative pushback, however in the following years, with the increased participation of women in the workplace, and their gradual liberation, veils were phased out of the common use by women throughout the country.

==== Headgear ====
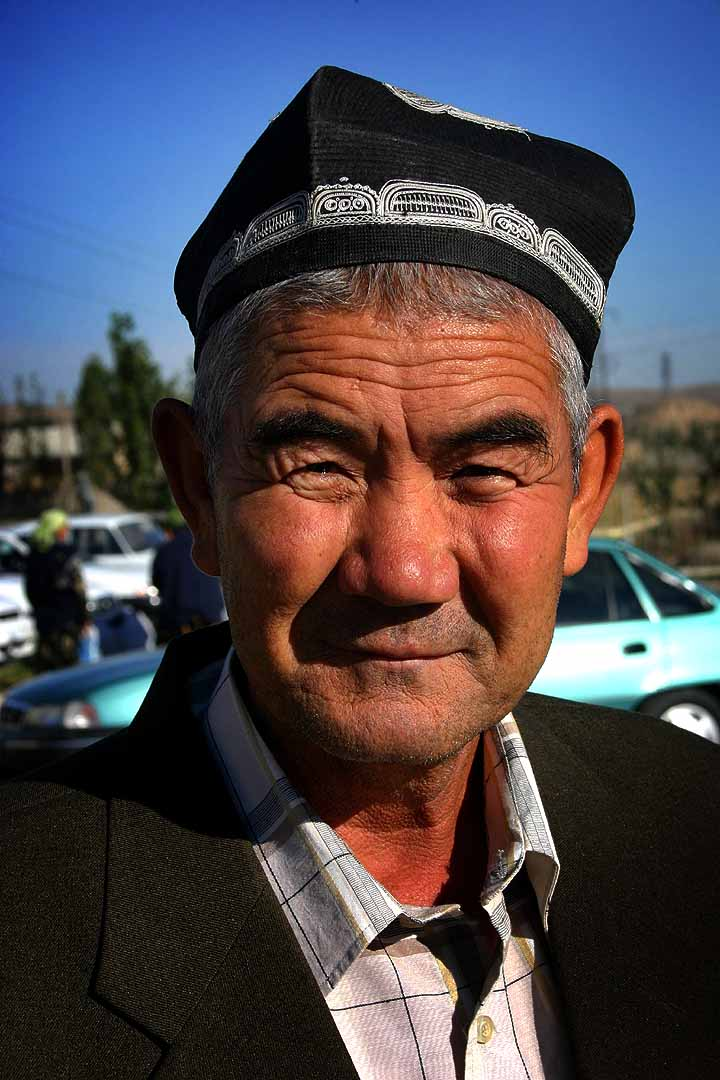
An Uzbek man wearing a skullcap, otherwise known as doppa or tyubeteika

The square skullcap, known as do'ppi in Uzbek and Tyubeteika in Russian, is worn by both males and females. They are made of either velvet or wool and embroidered with silk or silver threads. The design varies for males and females, with the variant worn by females, being more colorful and decorated with beads, while the male variant is usually black with four arches of pepper, which are believed to keep "evil and enemies" abay. The exception to this are the southern regions of Uzbekistan, where a more round and colorful cap is worn by both males and females. In the western region of Khorezm and in the Autonomous Republic of Karakalpakstan, men, also wear a traditional fur hat, made out of sheepskin in predominantly white and black colors.

== See also ==
- List of Uzbeks
- Sart
- Uzbeks In Russia
- Uyghurs
- Karakhanid Khanate
- Turkic peoples
- Mongol invasion of Central Asia
- Uzbeks in Pakistan
- Ethnic groups in Afghanistan
- Culture of Uzbekistan
