= Uzbeks in Pakistan =

Turkic ethnic group in Pakistan

Uzbeks
اۉزبېکلر O‘zbeklar

Total population
- c. 1 million

Regions with significant populations
- Khyber Pakhtunkhwa (Peshawar); FATA; Balochistan; Punjab; Karachi

Languages
- Uzbek; Dari; Pashto; Urdu (Note: The language is alternately known as Lashkari (لشکری)); English

Religion
- Islam

Related ethnic groups
- Uyghurs in Pakistan; Tajiks in Pakistan; Kyrgyz in Pakistan; Turkmens in Pakistan; Kazakhs in Pakistan

Uzbeks are a minority in Pakistan. With just over 1 million Uzbeks living in Pakistan. They were one of the first Karluk tribes to arrive in the modern-day region of Pakistan; they ruled the area of Pakhli (modern-day Hazara) for over 200 years from 1472 to 1703. Uzbeks form a significant minority group in the region of Khyber Pakhtunkhwa.

There are many Uzbek immigrants in Pakistan from Central Asian countries, mainly Afghanistan and Uzbekistan. In 2005 Around 2.3% of the Afghans residing in Pakistan were ethnic Uzbeks though this number has since increased. The Afghan War drove them to Pakistan. In 1981, many Afghan Uzbek refugees in Pakistan moved to Turkey to join the existing communities based in Kayseri, İzmir, Ankara and Zeytinburnu. The Uzbeks can be found mainly in north-west Pakistan, comprising the areas of Khyber Pakhtunkhwa (in particular Peshawar), Gilgit-Baltistan and Balochistan. Additionally, Uzbek militants allied to al-Qaeda from the Islamic Movement of Uzbekistan and Islamic Jihad Union are believed to reside in the Federally Administered Tribal Areas. Their number at their height was predicted to be anywhere from 500 to 5,000. Now, only a few hundred foreign militants of various nationalities are thought to remain in Pakistan – the majority either having been killed by the Pakistani military's Zarb-e-Azb operation launched in 2014 or shifting to other theaters of jihadist conflicts, such as Syria.

== See also ==
- Pakistan–Uzbekistan relations
- 2014 Karachi airport attack
- Mohammad Rozi
- Islamic Movement of Uzbekistan
- Uyghurs in Pakistan

== Sources ==
- Rutherford, Alex (2010). Empire of the Moghul: Brothers at War: Brothers at War. Headline. ISBN 978-0-7553-8326-9.
