= Abdul Rasul (Uyghur) =

Abdul Rasul is a citizen of Pakistan of Uyghur origin, who served as leader of an expatriate group, the Asian Muslims Human Rights Bureau. He is reported to have gone into exile in Pakistan in 1967. Little else is known about him.

Abdul Rasul is reported to have claimed support from Osama bin Laden of Al Qaeda, from senior members of the Taliban and from Teheran Ali Muza of Lebanese Hizbollah. He claimed to have "4,000 Uyghur nationalists" in his movement. He claimed Uyghurs were fighting with their allies in Kashmir, in Lebanon and Afghanistan.

He alleged that Chinese authorities would only allow individuals over 18 years old to attend mosques and alleged that Chinese authorities had stopped Muslims from making the pilgrimage to Mecca.
