= Asian Muslims Human Rights Bureau =

The Asian Muslims Human Rights Bureau was a group said to have been organized to aid Muslim expatriates in Asia that had ties to Osama bin Laden and Al-Qaeda. It was reported to have been led by a "Pakistani citizen of Xinjiang origin"—a Uyghur named Abdul Rasul.

In 1999 the Kashmir Sentinel, a newspaper published in the Indian part of the disputed region of Kashmir, asserted that Pakistan was encouraging expatriate Uyghur militants in an attempt to destabilize China's Xinjiang Province and named the Asian Muslim Human Rights Bureau as a "front group".
