= Sayyid Qāsim bin Abd al-Jabbaar Al-Andijaani =

Islamic scholar

- Born: 1885; Butaqora, Fergana Oblast, Russian Empire
- Died: 23 February 1973 (aged 87–88); Medina, Saudi Arabia
- Resting place: Al-Baqi Cemetery, Medina, Saudi Arabia
- Education: Darul Uloom Deoband
- Occupation: Islamic Scholar

Sayyid Qāsim Andijaani (Arabic: السيد قاسم بن عبد الجبار الأنديجاني) was an Islamic scholar and author, born in Andijan in Fergana Valley of Turkestan in 1885.

== Biography ==
Sayyid Qāsim bin Abd al-Jabbaar Al-Andijaani was born in Butaqora village near Andijan (today belongs to Andijan District of Andijan region). After finishing his school in the village, he continued his education in "Jome" madrasah in Andijan city. Popular mudarris Mulla Khalikberdi Akhun, Yunus Akhun taught him at madrasah. Later his father sent him madrasas in Khujand, Tashkent and Bukhara for further education.

After finishing those madrasas at the age of 26, in 1911 he went to British India to study at "Darul Uloom Deoband" for five years. In 1916, he came back to his village in Andijan to teach villagers. After some time, because of the oppression of the communist regime, he had to leave his country. He went to Afghanistan, India and Hejaz in the end. He taught hadith, tafseer and fiqh in Mecca. He taught students including the imam of the Masjid al-Haram, Abduzzakhir Abus Samh.

Moreover, he also taught at "Darul Uloomish Shariah", "Darul Aytamil Qariyba" in Medina. And in 1356 hijri year (approx. y. 1937) he appointed as a muderris to Al-Masjid an-Nabawi. In some classes, he taught in uzbek language.

He wrote several book in Arabic language like 380-page-book "al-Misbah fiy usulil hadis", "al-Aqeedatul khalisa" and "al-Iqtisad fiy masailil itiqad". He wrote an uzbek tafseer for Quran "Fathur Rahman fiy tafseeril Quran". Moreover, he wrote 530-page-book named "Sharhul aqiydatul halisa", "Islom yo'li" (Road of Islam), "Lozim vazifalar" (Must duties), "Muhammad ibn Qosim", "Muhtasarul jami'il usul fiy ahodisir Rosul" in uzbek language.

He died in 19th of Muharram, 1393 Hijri (Friday, 23 February 1973) and buried at Al-Baqi Cemetery in Medina, Saudi Arabia.

== Books ==
- al-Misbah fiy usulil hadis
- al-Aqeedatul khalisa
- al-Iqtisad fiy masailil itiqad
- Fathur Rahman fiy tafseeril Quran
- Sharhul aqiydatul halisa
- Islom yo'li
- Lozim Vazifalar
- Muhammad ibn Qosim
- Muhtasarul jami'il usul fiy ahodisir Rosul
