= Zhangye National Geopark =

National Geopark in Gansu, Northwest China

Zhangye National Geopark 张掖国家地质公园
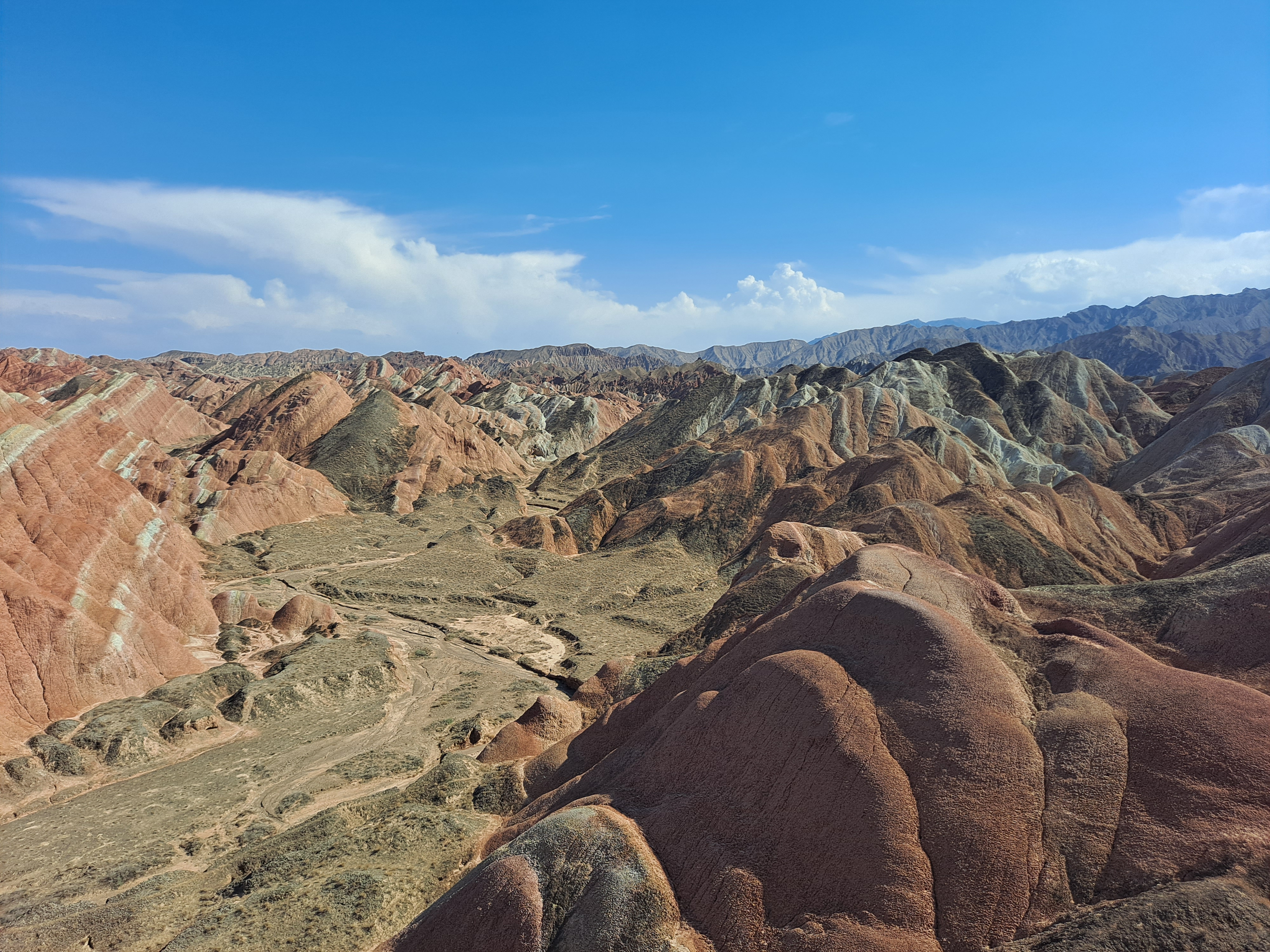
- Badlands of Zhangye National Geopark

- Location within Gansu Location within China
- Location: Linze County and Sunan County, Gansu, China
- Nearest city: Zhangye
- Coordinates: 38°54′55.98″N 100°7′59.52″E
- Area: 322 km^{2} (124 sq mi)
- Established: 27 December 2005 (as provincial geopark)

Zhangye National Geopark (simplified Chinese: 张掖国家地质公园; traditional Chinese: 張掖國家地質公園; pinyin: Zhāngyè Guójiā Dìzhìgōngyuán) is located in Sunan and Linze counties within the prefecture-level city of Zhangye, in Gansu, China. It covers 322 square kilometres (124 sq mi). The site became a quasi-national geopark on 23 April 2012 (provisional name: Zhangye Danxia Geopark). It was formally designated as "Zhangye National Geopark" by the Ministry of Land and Resources on 16 June 2016, after it passed the on-site acceptance test.

Known for its colorful rock formations, Chinese media outlets have voted it one of China's most beautiful landforms. It became a UNESCO Global Geopark in 2019.

== Location ==
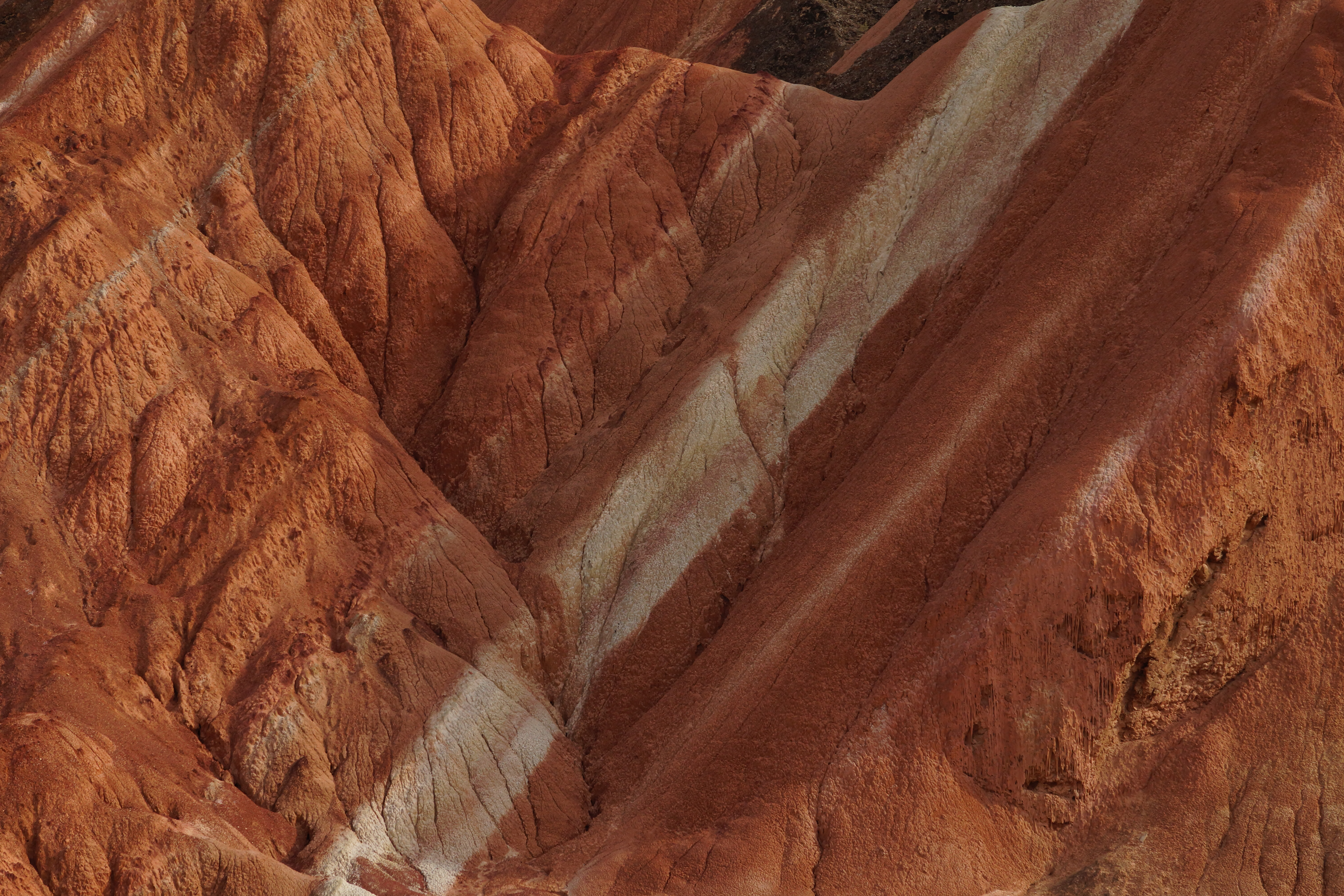
Layers in the geopark

The park is located in the northern foothills of the Qilian Mountains, in the counties of Linze and Sunan, which are under the administration of the prefecture-level city of Zhangye, Gansu province. The main areas of Danxia landform are in Kangle and Baiyin townships.

The core area of the park, Linze Danxia Scenic Area, is located 30 kilometres (19 mi) west of downtown Zhangye and 20 kilometres (12 mi) south of the seat of Linze County. It is the most developed and most visited part of the park. A second scenic area, Binggou (冰沟), located on the north bank of Liyuan River (梨园河), was officially inaugurated on 3 August 2014. Binggou covers an area of 300 square kilometres (120 sq mi), and its elevation ranges from 1,500 to 2,500 meters above sea level. A third area, Sunan Danxia Scenic Area, is located in Ganjun, south of Linze.

== Landscape ==
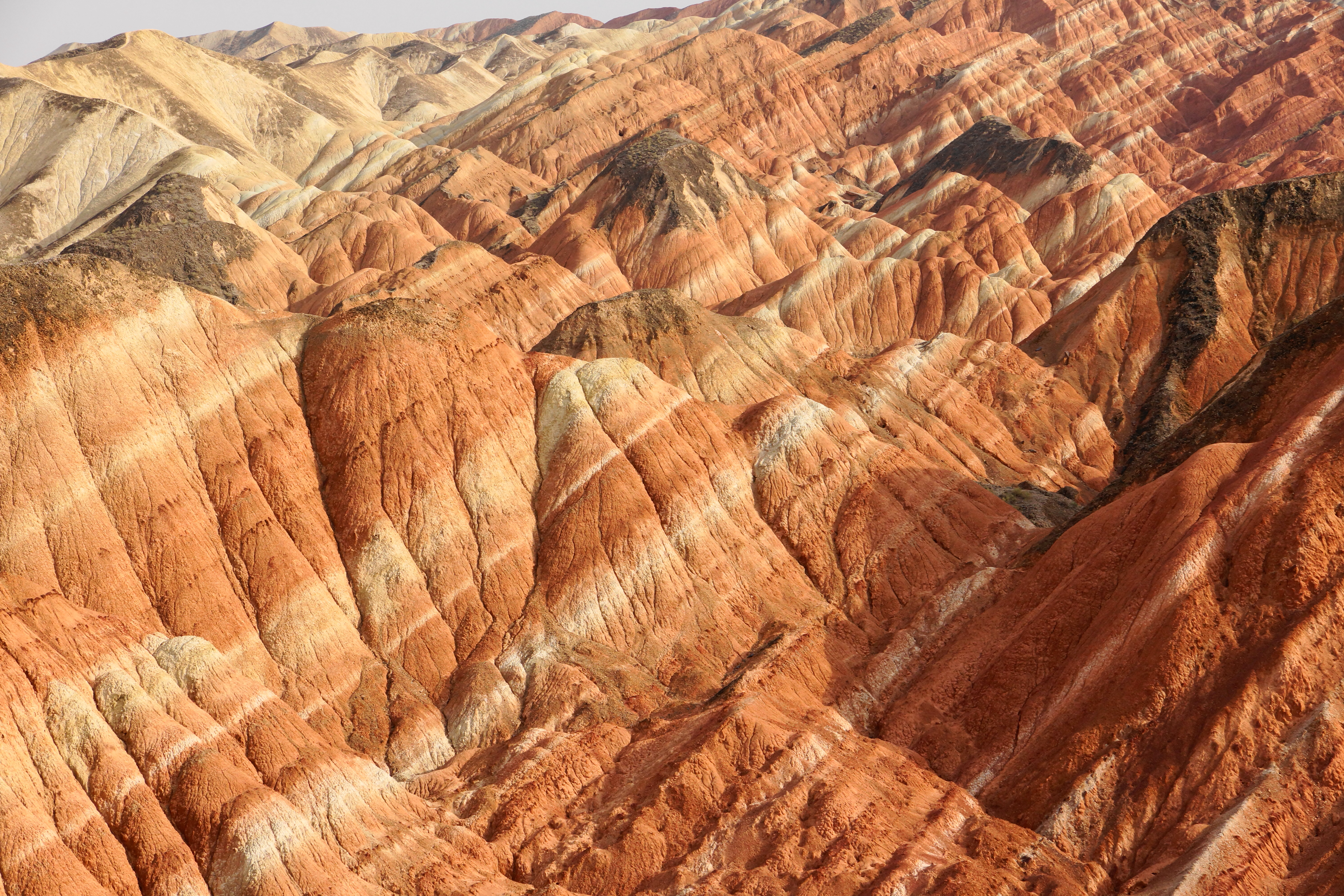
Landscape of Zhangye National Geopark

Zhangye Danxia is known for the unusual colors of the rocks, which are smooth, sharp, and several hundred meters tall. They are the result of deposits of sandstone and other minerals that occurred over 24 million years. The result (similar to a layer cake), was tilted by the action of the same tectonic plates responsible for creating parts of the Himalayan mountains. Wind, rain, and time then sculpted extraordinary shapes, including towers, pillars, and ravines, with varying colours, patterns, and sizes.

== Media and tourism ==
In 2005, Zhangye Danxia was voted by a panel of reporters from 34 major media outlets as one of the most beautiful Danxia landform areas in China. In 2009, Chinese National Geography magazine chose Zhangye Danxia as one of the "six most beautiful landforms" in China. The area has become a top tourist attraction for Zhangye. A series of boardwalks and access roads have been built to help visitors to explore the rock formations. In 2014, 100 million yuan was invested to improve the facilities in the Binggou area.

== Gallery ==
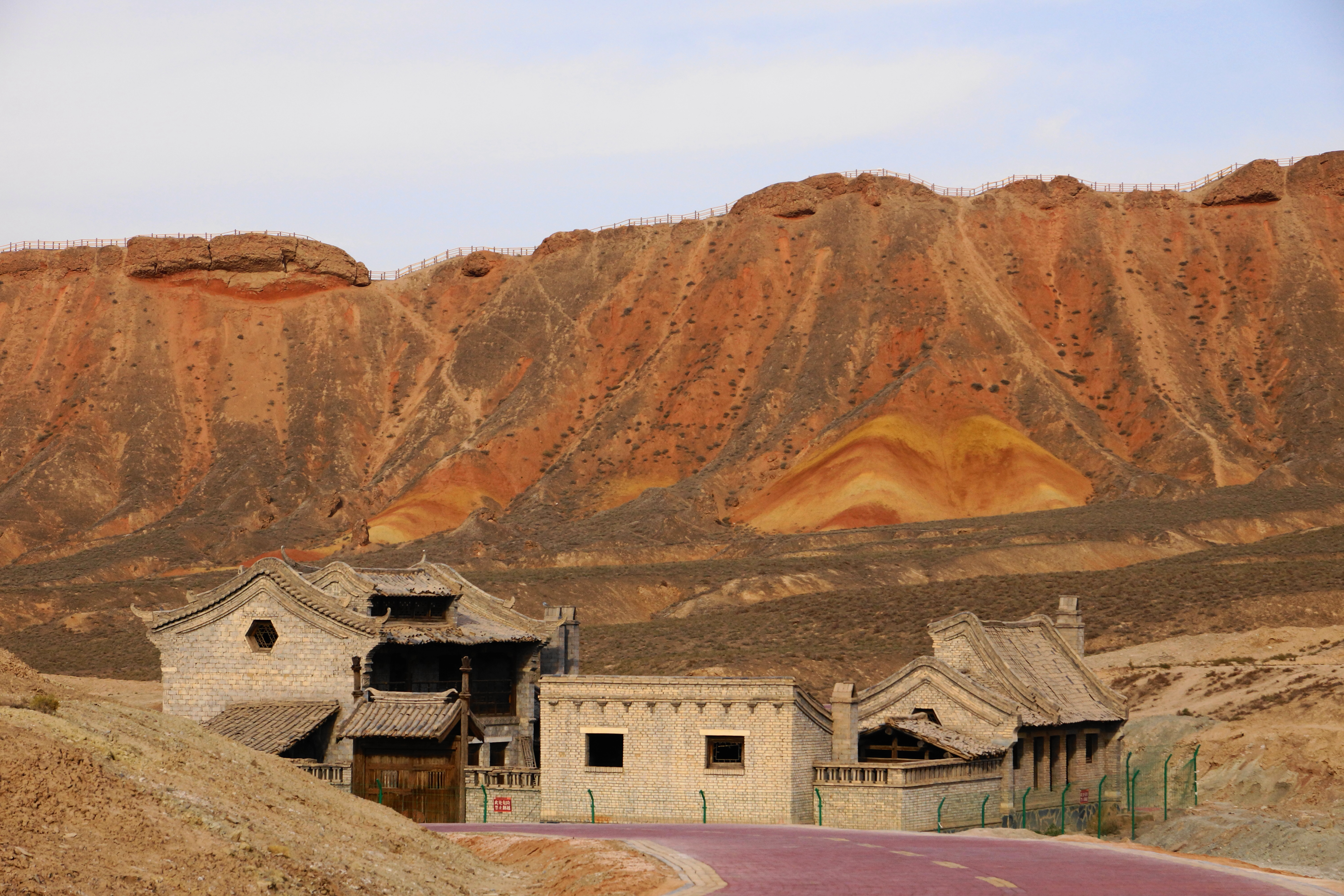

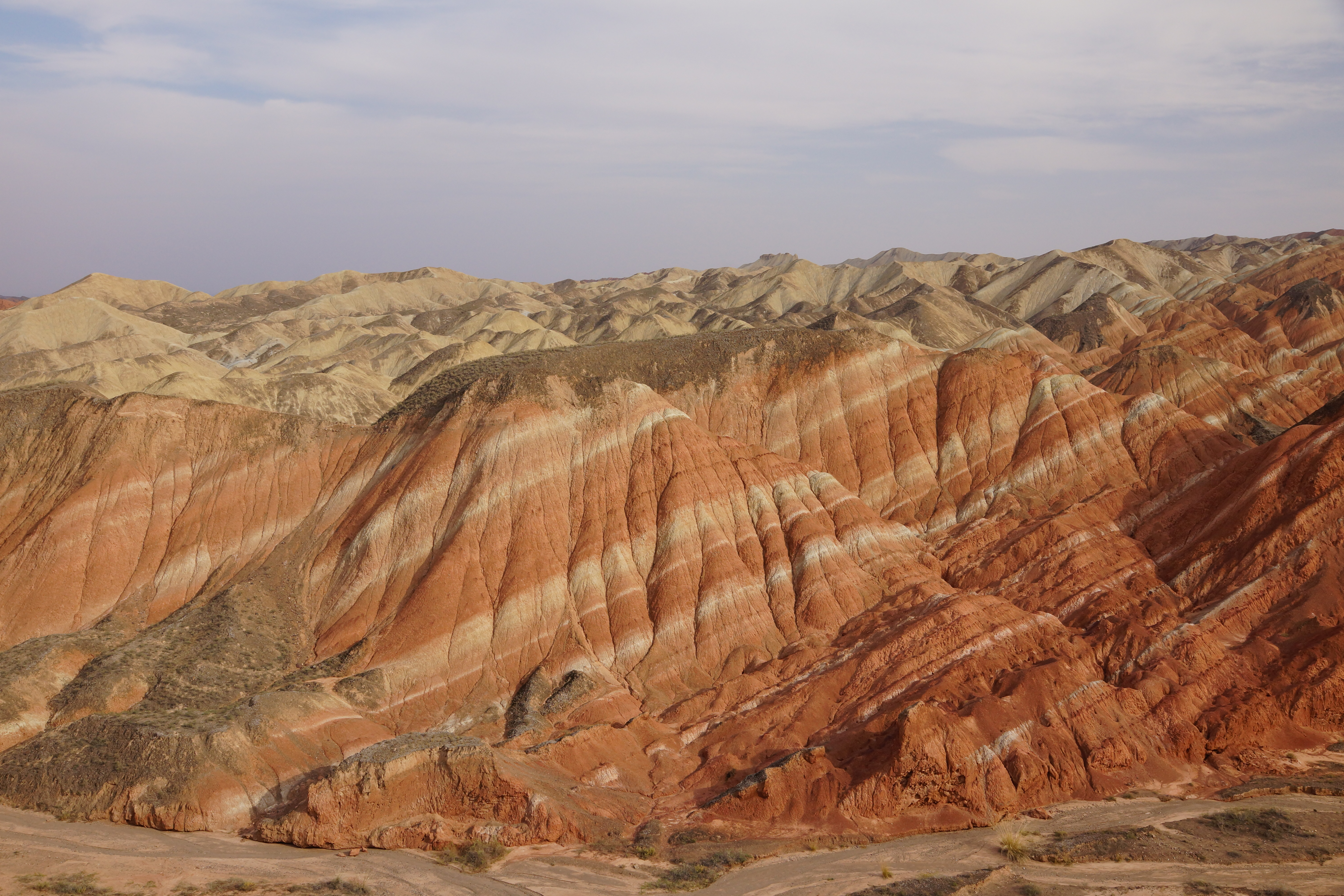

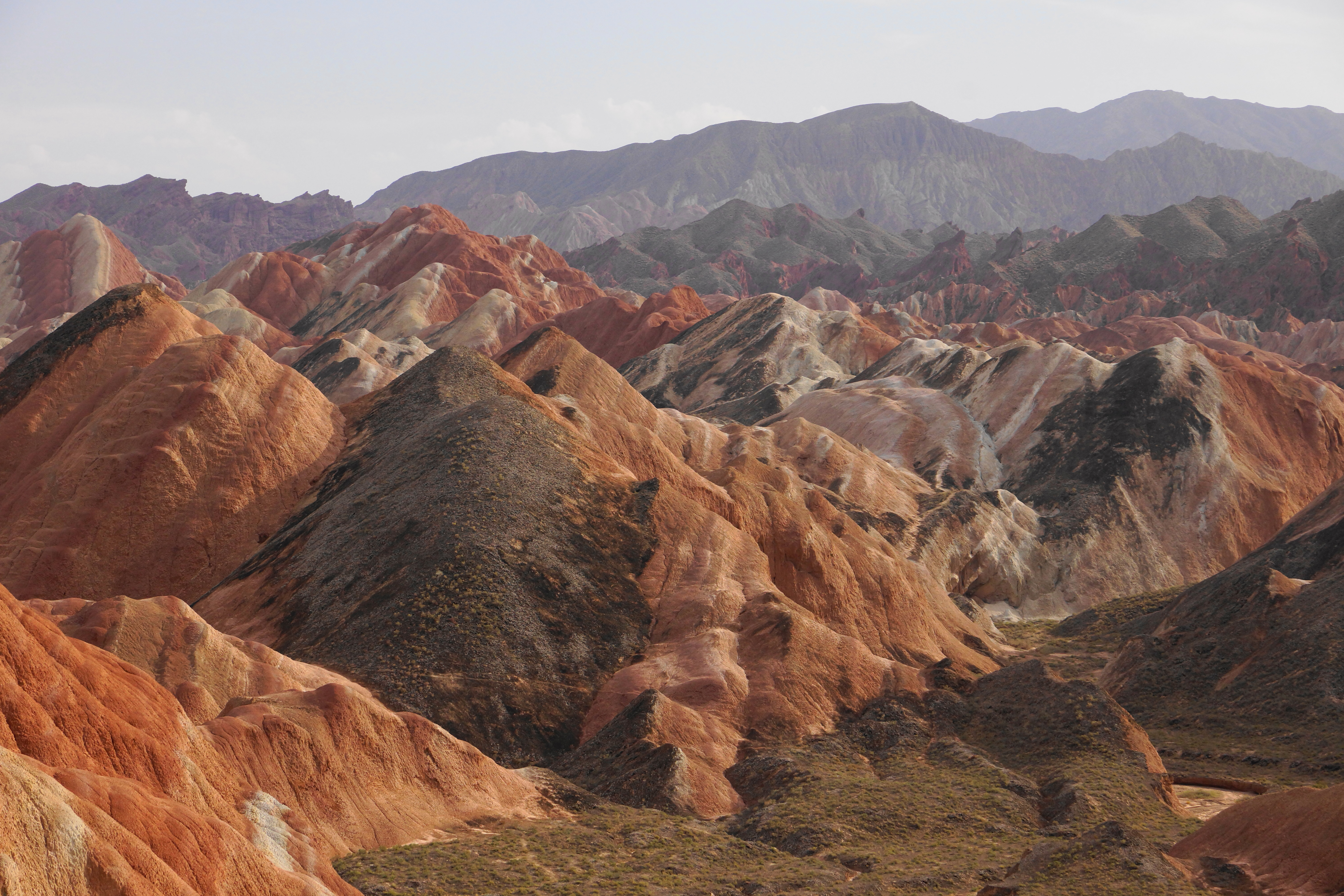

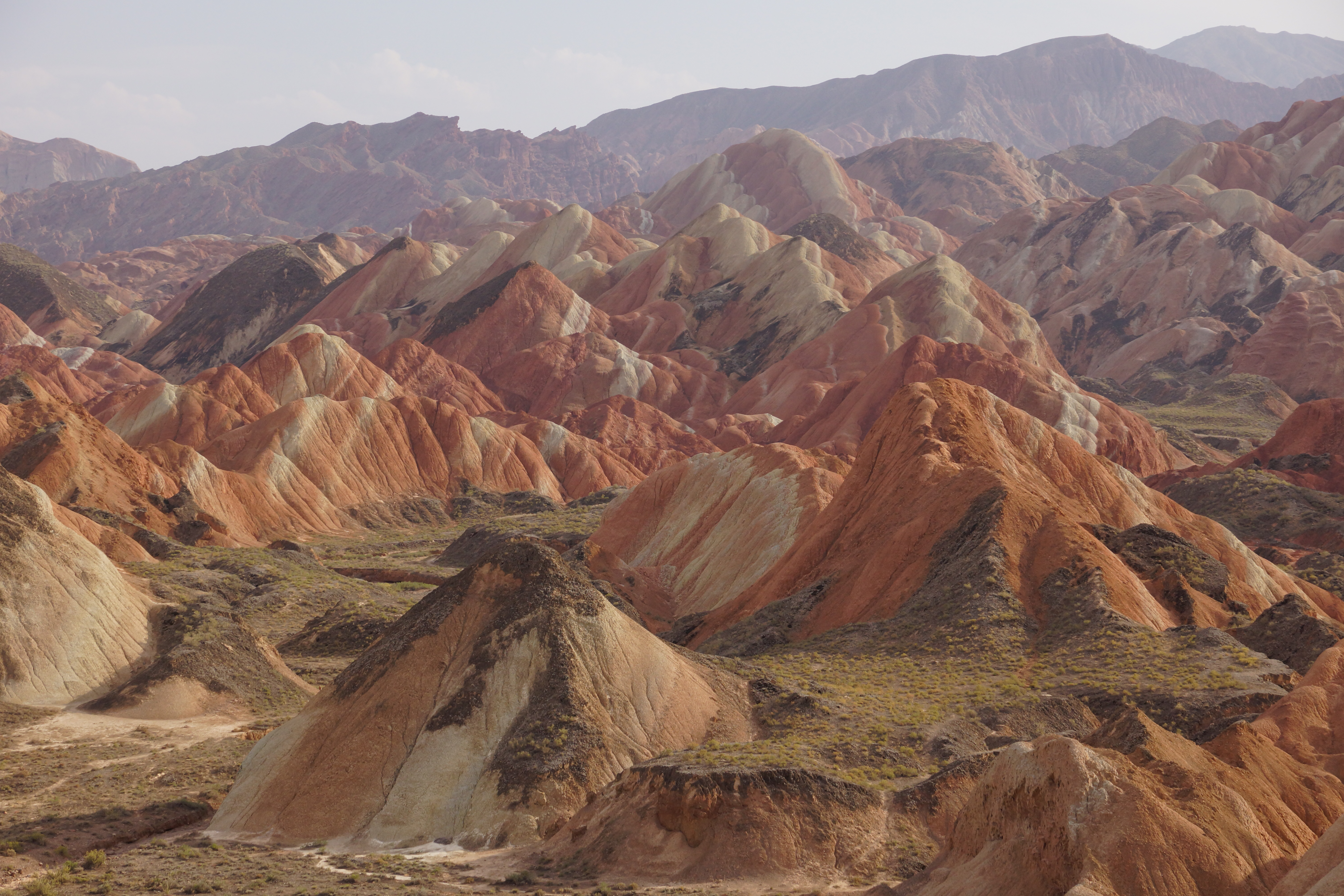

== See also ==
- China Danxia World Heritage Site
- Candy Cane Mountains
- Painted Hills
- Seven Coloured Earths
- Vinicunca
