= Zhangye railway station =

Railway station in Zhangye, China

Zhangye 张掖
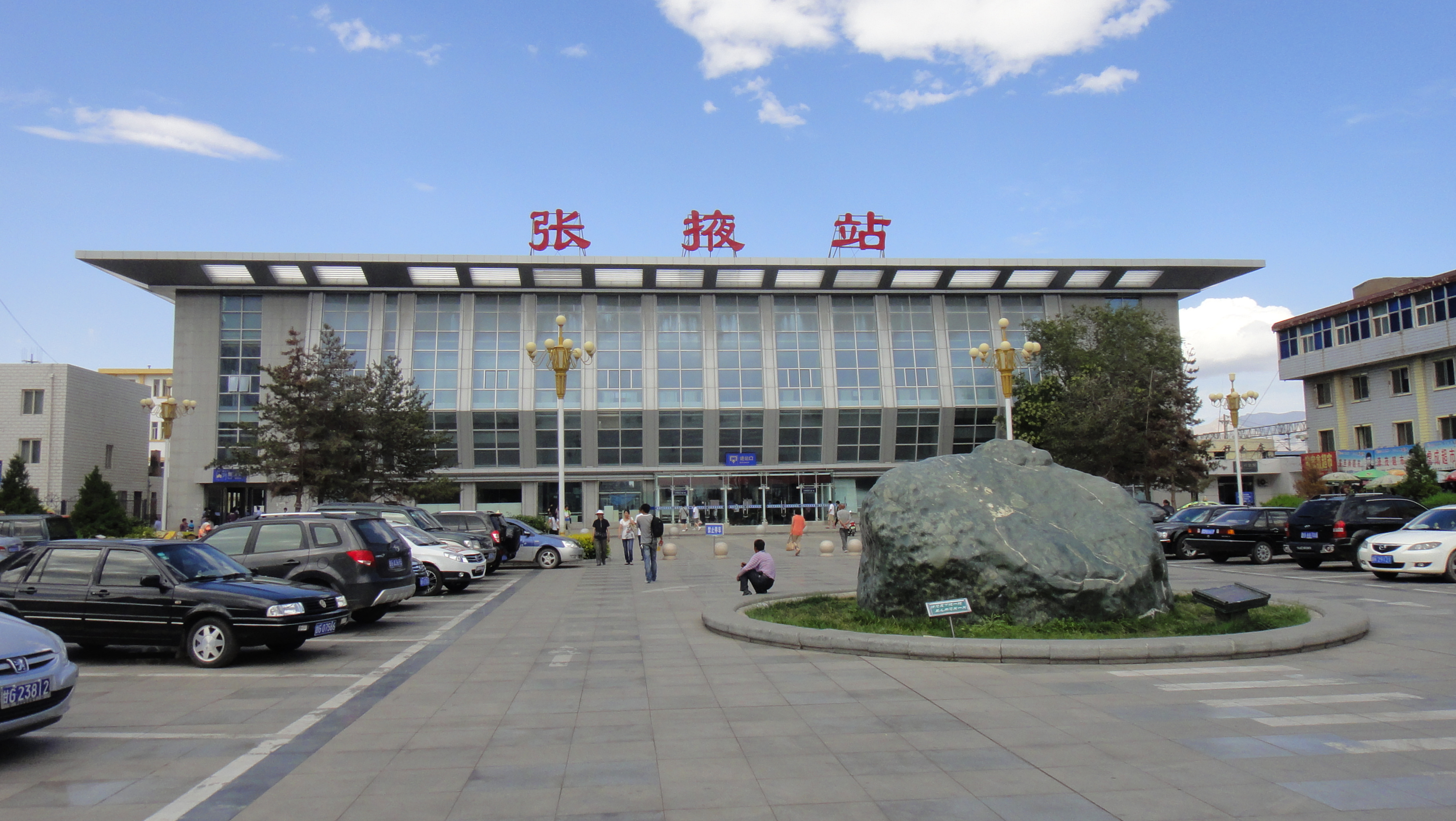

General information
- Other names: Zhangye
- Location: Ganzhou District, Zhangye, Gansu; China
- Coordinates: 38.97316°N 100.51776°E
- Operated by: Ministry of Railways of the People's Republic of China
- Line(s): Lanzhou–Xinjiang Railway
Location

Zhangye railway station is located 6.4 km north east of Zhangye, Gansu. It handles about 49 passenger services per day along the Lanzhou–Xinjiang Railway as well as being a major freight depot.

The platforms are all low level servicing 3 tracks, one alongside the station building and two more along an island platform reached via a footbridge.

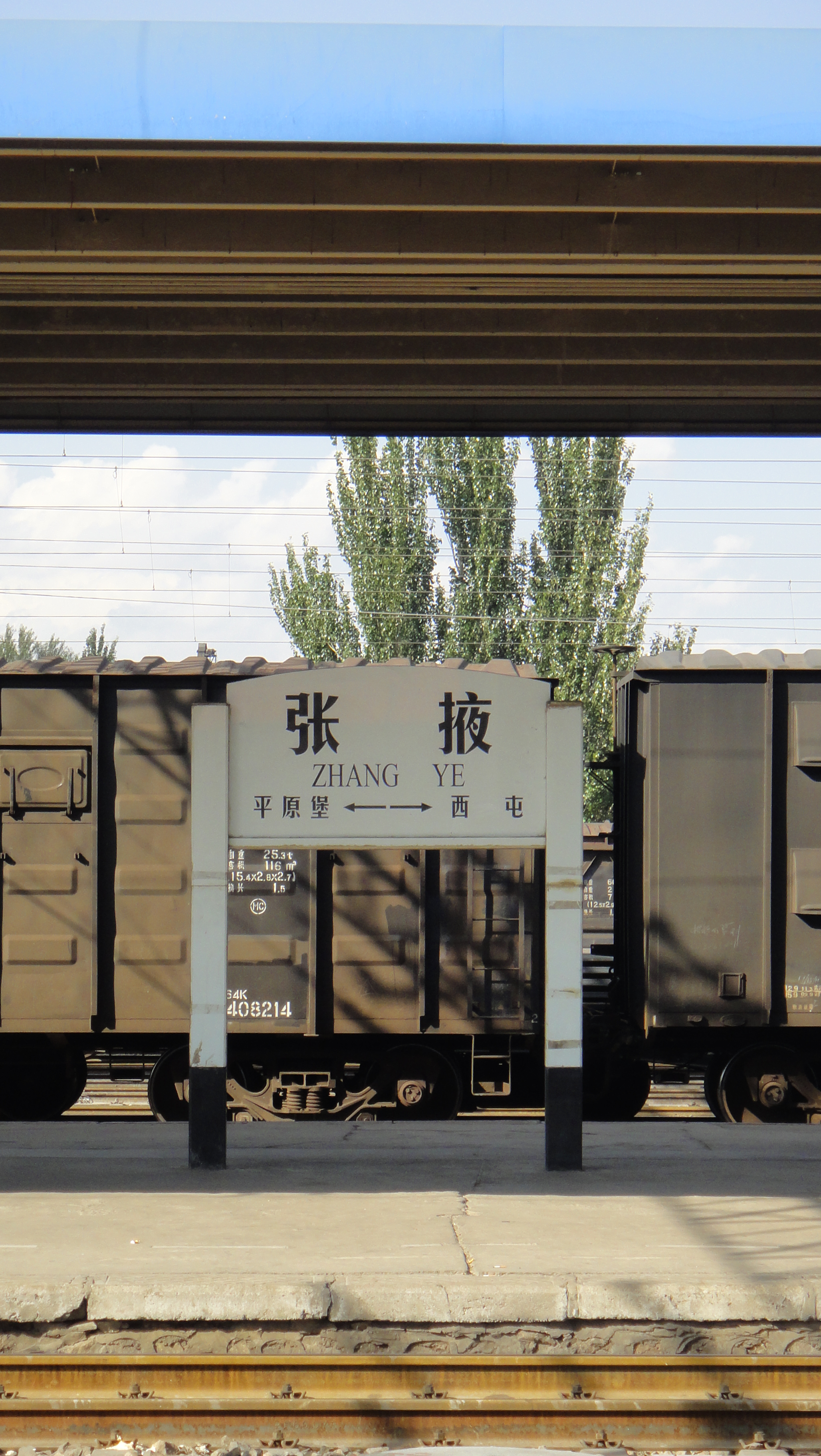
Looking across to the Island platform
