= Zhangye =

Zhangye 张掖市
- Prefecture-level city
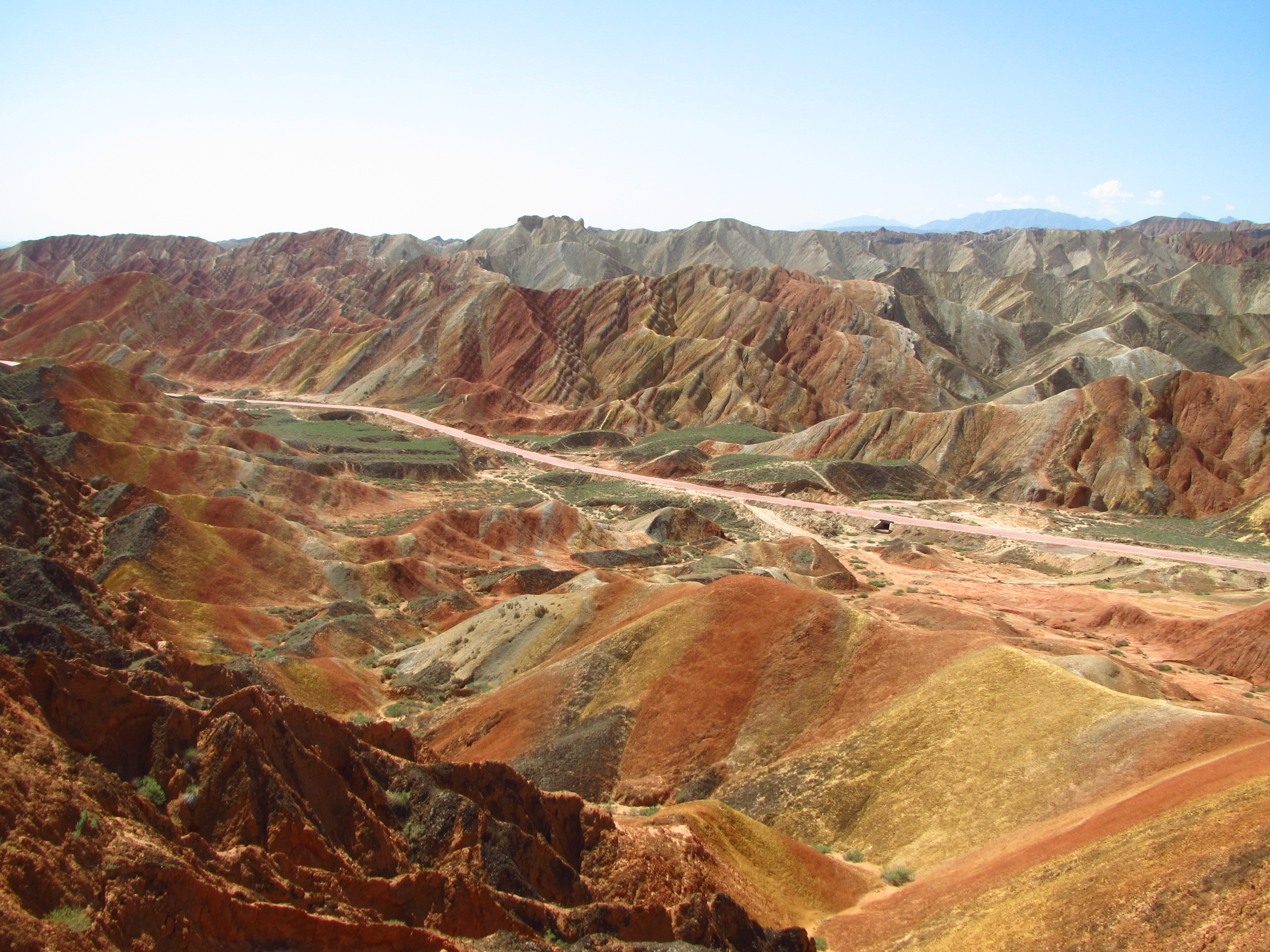
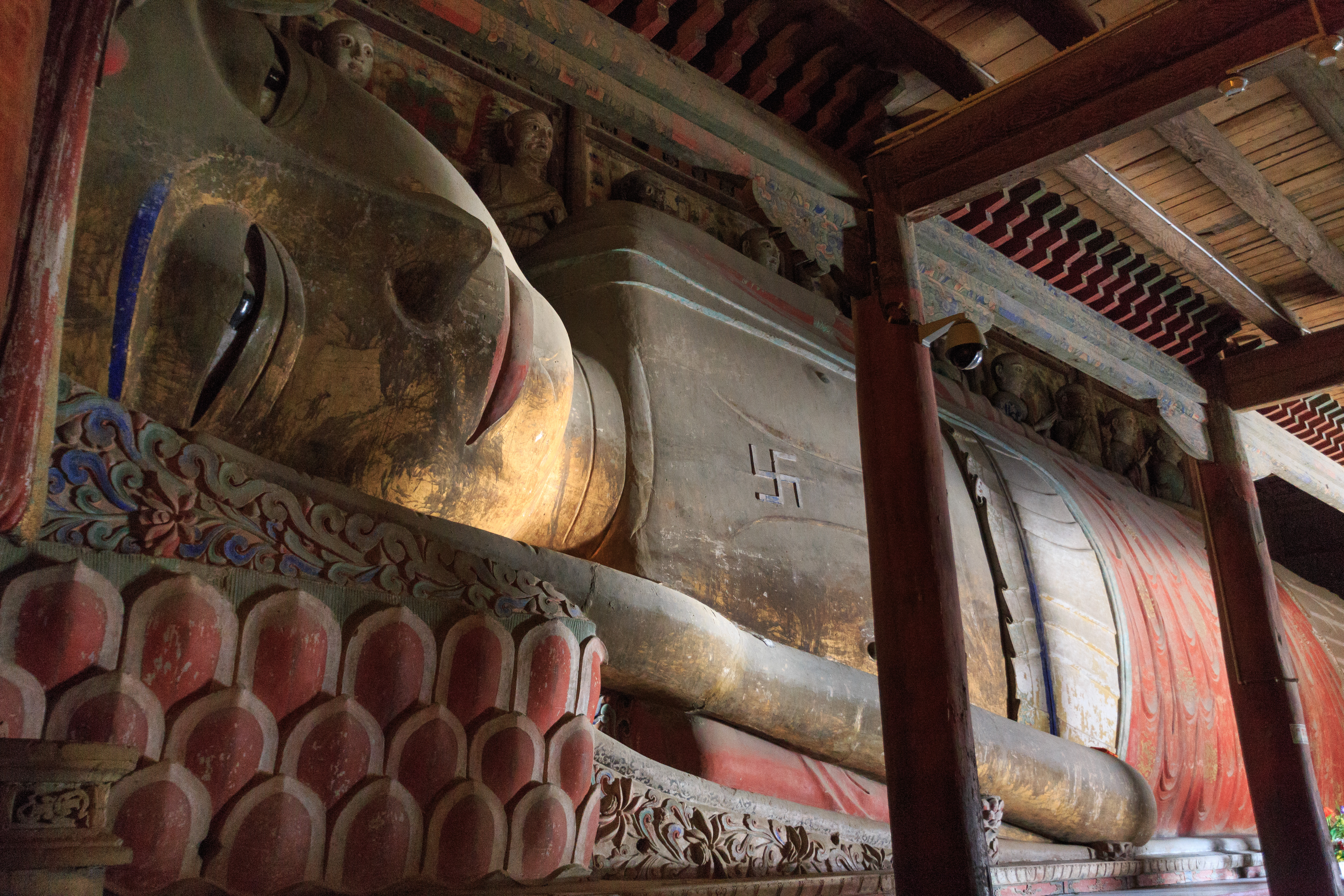
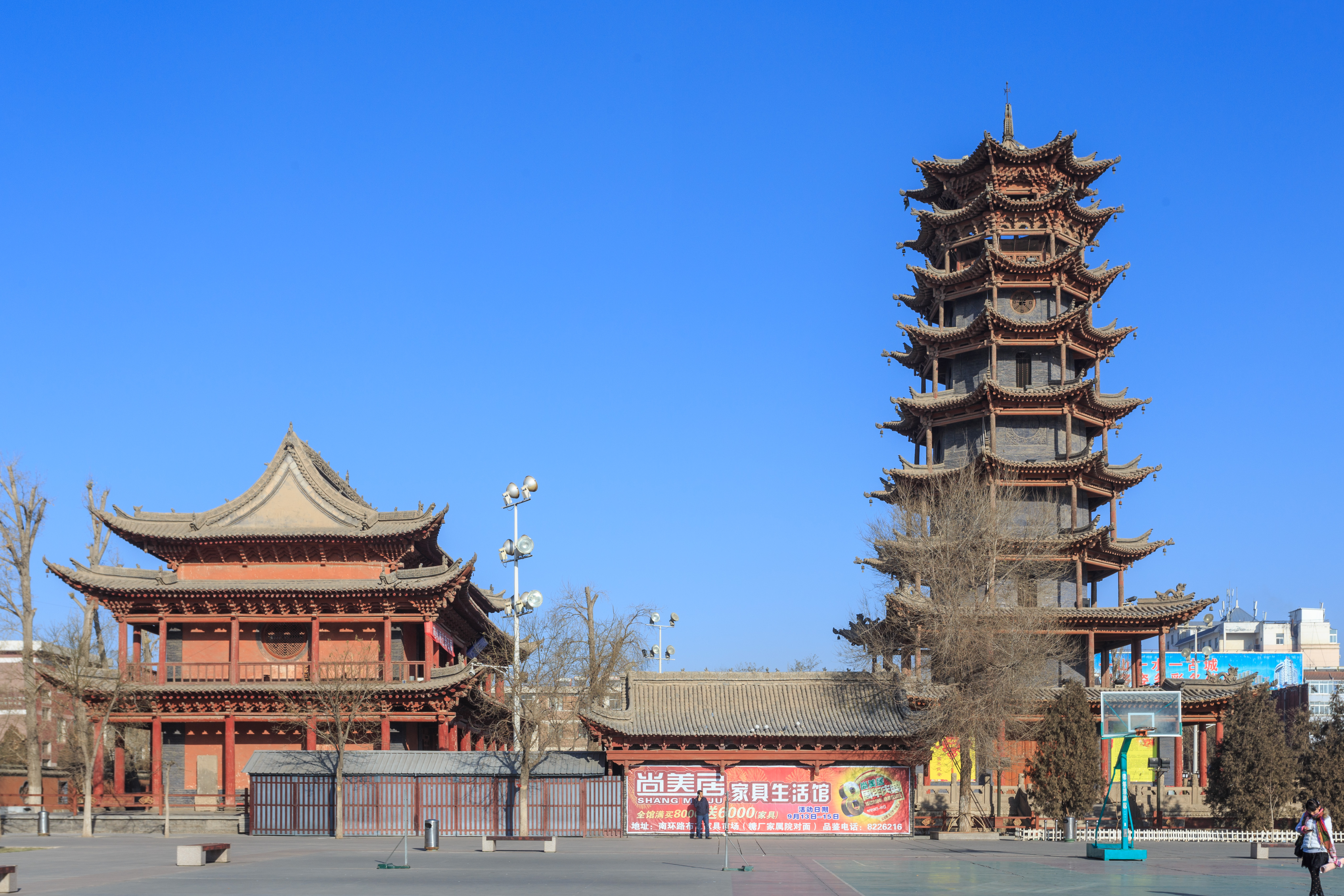
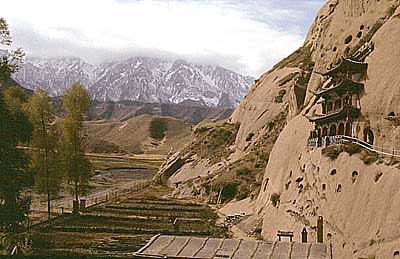
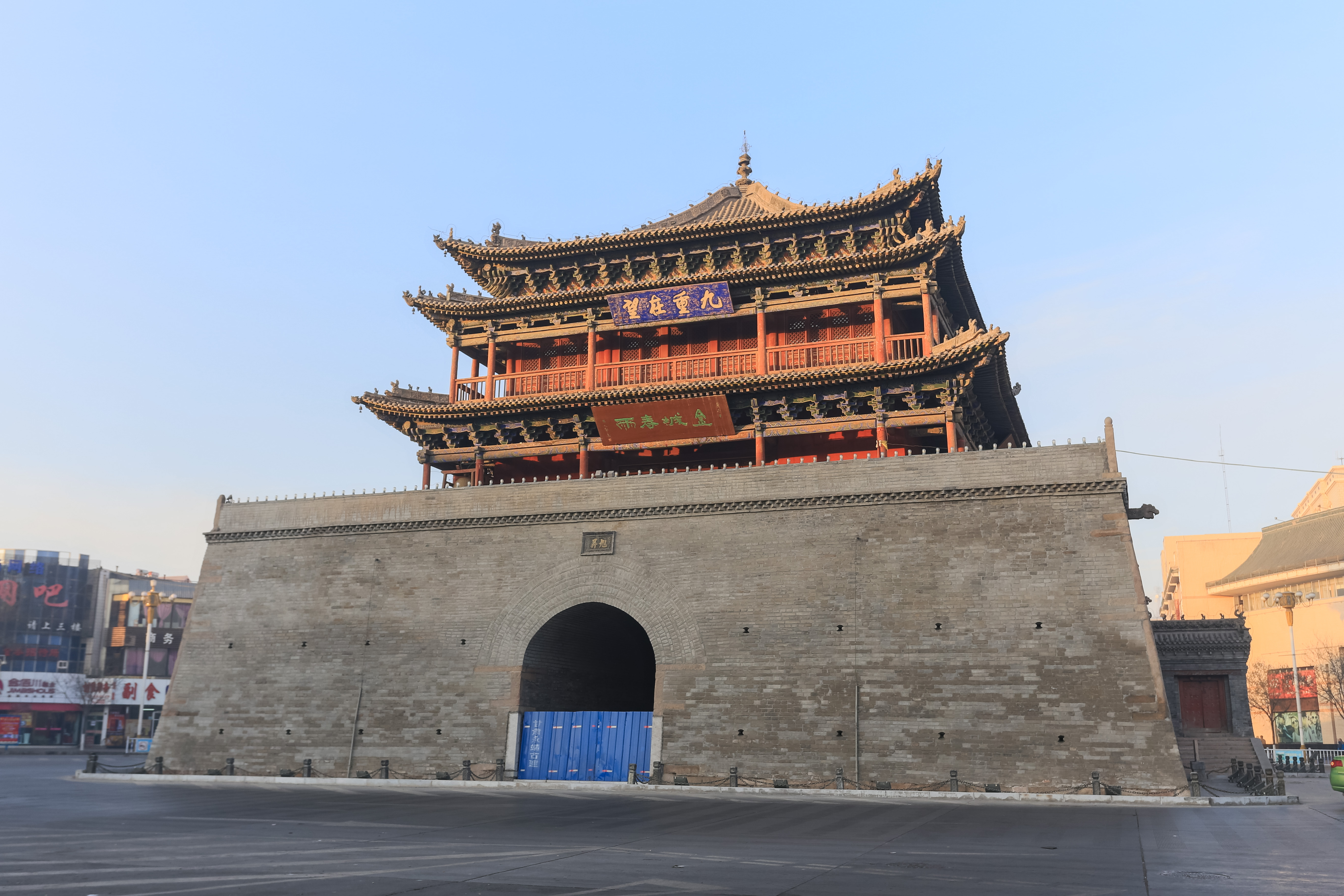
- Zhangye National Geopark Dafo Temple Wanshou Temple Matisi Grottoes Zhangye Drum Tower

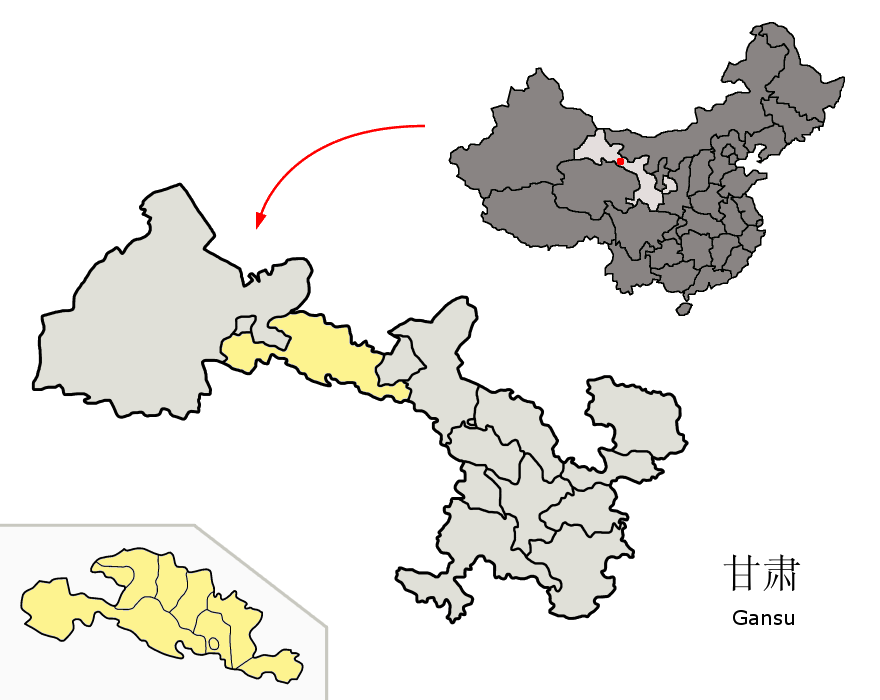
- Location of Zhangye City jurisdiction in Gansu

- Location of the city center in Gansu Zhangye (China)
- Coordinates (Zhangye municipal government): 38°55′29″N 100°27′00″E
- Country: People's Republic of China
- Province: Gansu
- Municipal seat: Ganzhou District

Area
  - Total: 42,000 km^{2} (16,000 sq mi)

Population (2010)
  - Total: 1,199,515

GDP
  - Total: CN¥ 37.4 billion US$ 6.0 billion
  - Per capita: CN¥ 30,704; US$ 4,930
- Time zone: UTC+8 (China Standard)
- Postal code: 734000
- ISO 3166 code: CN-GS-07
- Website: www.zhangye.gov.cn

Zhangye
- Traditional Chinese: 張掖
- Simplified Chinese: 张掖
- Postal: Kanchow
Transcriptions
Standard Mandarin
- Hanyu Pinyin: Zhāngyè
- Wade–Giles: Chang^{1}-yeh^{4}

Ganzhou
- Chinese: 甘州
- Literal meaning: Sweet [Spring(s)] Prefecture
Transcriptions
Standard Mandarin
- Hanyu Pinyin: Gānzhōu
- Wade–Giles: Kan-chou

Zhangye (simplified Chinese: 张掖; traditional Chinese: 張掖; pinyin: Zhāngyè), formerly romanized as Changyeh and also formerly known as Kanchow, is a prefecture-level city in central Gansu Province in the People's Republic of China. It borders Inner Mongolia on the north and Qinghai on the south. Its central district is Ganzhou, formerly a city of the Western Xia and one of the most important outposts of western China.

== Name ==
Although Zhangye is the oldest recorded name, the city was also formerly also known as Ganzhou, named after the sweet waters (Chinese: 甘泉; pinyin: Gānquán) of its oasis. An alternative theory states that "Gan" was from the Ganjun Hill (绀峻山) near the city. The name of province came from a contraction of Ganzhou and Suzhou (modern Jiuquan). The name appears in Marco Polo's Travels under the name Campichu.

Zhangye Commandery was established by Western Han in 111 BC, with the seat at the site of modern Wuwei, Gansu. The etymology of Zhangye is unclear. A popular theory interprets the name Zhangye as "Extending Arm", excerpted from a phrase "to extend the arm of the country through to the Western Realm" (张国臂掖，以通西域) documented in Han Shu.

== History ==
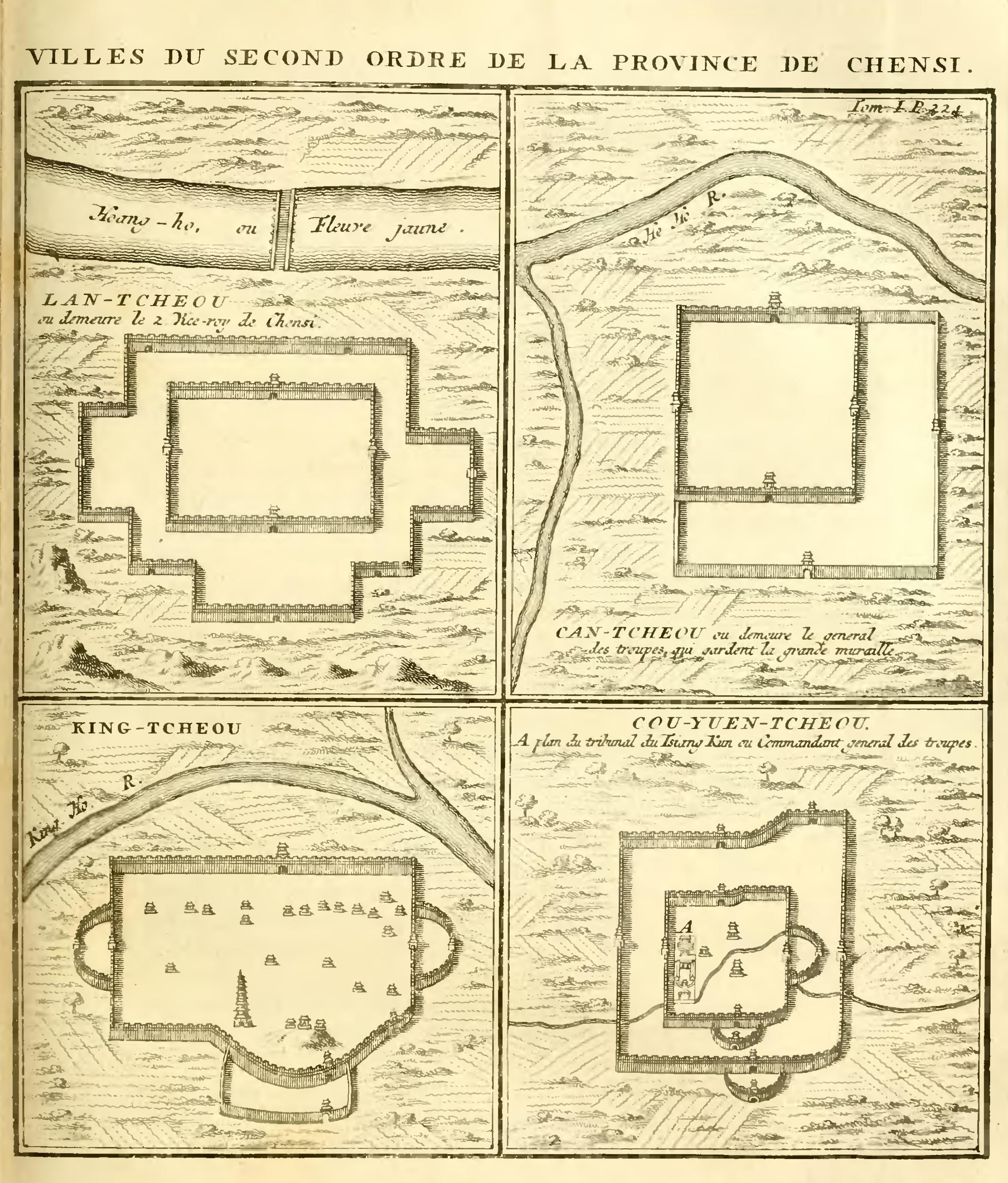
"Can-tcheou" and other "second-order" towns of Shaan-Gan from Du Halde's 1736 Description of China, based on reports from Jesuit missionaries

Zhangye lies in the centre of the Hexi Corridor. The area is on the frontier of China proper, protecting it from the nomads of the northwest and permitting its armies access to the Tarim Basin. During the Western Han dynasty, Han armies were often engaged against the Xiongnu in this area. It was also an important outpost on the Silk Road. Before being over-run by the Mongols, it was dominated by the Western Xia dynasty, and before by the Uyghurs from at least the early 10th century. Its relation to the larger Uyghur state of Qocho is obscure, but it may have been a vassal.

The Yuan dynasty founding emperor Kublai is said to have been born in the Dafo Temple, Zhangye, now the site of the longest wooden reclining Buddha in China. Marco Polo's journal states that he spent a year in the town during his journey to China.

The pine forests of the Babao Mountains (part of the Qilian range) formerly regulated the flow of the Ruo or Hei Shui, Ganzhou's primary river. By ensuring that the melt-waters lasted throughout the summer, they avoided both early flood and later drought for the valley's farmers. Despite recommendations that they should thus be protected in perpetuity, a Qing dynasty imperial official in charge of erecting the poles for China's telegraph network ordered them cleared in the 1880s. Almost immediately, the region became prone to flooding in the summer and draught in the autumn, arousing local resentment.

Christian missionaries arrived in 1879, after Suzhou (modern-day Jiuquan) was found to be too hostile for their settlement.

== Administration ==
Zhangye has one urban district, four counties, one autonomous county, 97 towns, and 978 villages.

Map
Note: Shandan Horseground is part of Shandan County.
| # | Name | Hanzi | Hanyu Pinyin | Population (2020) | Area (km^{2}) | Density (/km^{2}) |
| 1 | Ganzhou District | 甘州区 | Gānzhōu Qū | 519,096 | 4,240 | 120 |
| 2 | Minle County | 民乐县 | Mínlè Xiàn | 192,476 | 3,687 | 59.5 |
| 3 | Linze County | 临泽县 | Línzé Xiàn | 115,946 | 2,777 | 48.4 |
| 4 | Gaotai County | 高台县 | Gāotái Xiàn | 125,705 | 4,312 | 33.3 |
| 5 | Shandan County | 山丹县 | Shāndān Xiàn | 150,031 | 5,402 | 30 |
| 6 | Sunan Yugur Autonomous County | 肃南裕固族自治县 | Sùnán Yùgùzú; Zìzhìxiàn | 27,762 | 20,456 | 1.6 |

== Geography ==
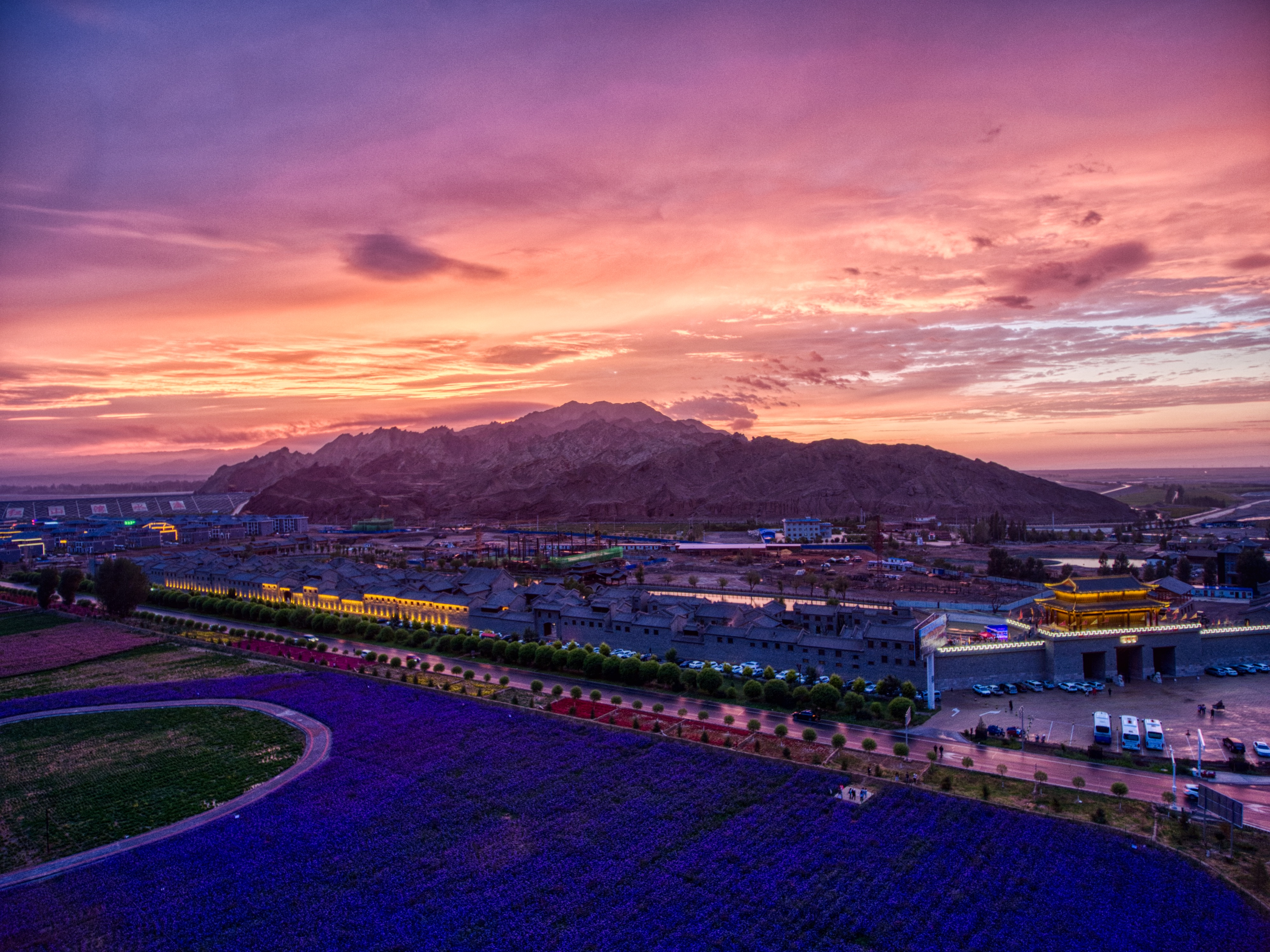
Sunset in Zhangye

Zhangye is located in central Gansu along the Hexi Corridor, occupying 42,000 km^{2} (16,000 sq mi). It takes up the entire breadth of the province, running from Inner Mongolia on the north to Qinghai on the south, but its urban core is at Ganzhou in the oasis formed by the Ruo or Hei River. Its streams, sunlight, and fertile soil make it an important regional agricultural centre, although it was seriously damaged by over-foresting in the 19th century.

The Zhangye Danxia National Geological Park, covering an area of 510 square kilometres (200 sq mi), is located in Linze and Sunan counties of Zhangye, 30 kilometers (19 mi) west of the city center. Known for its colourful rock formations, it has been voted by Chinese media outlets as one of the most beautiful land-forms in China.

=== Climate ===
Zhangye has a cold desert climate (Köppen BWk) with very warm summers and cold and very dry winters. The monthly 24-hour average temperature ranges from −9.1 °C (15.6 °F) in January to 22.3 °C (72.1 °F) in July. The mean annual temperature is 7.8 °C (46.0 °F), while annual rainfall is 132.6 mm (5.22 in), almost all of which falls from May to September. The winters are so dry that snow is extremely rare.

Climate data for Zhangye, elevation 1,461 m (4,793 ft), (1991–2020 normals, extremes 1971–present)
| Month | Jan | Feb | Mar | Apr | May | Jun | Jul | Aug | Sep | Oct | Nov | Dec | Year |
|---|---|---|---|---|---|---|---|---|---|---|---|---|---|
| Record high °C (°F) | 18.4 (65.1) | 24.2 (75.6) | 27.6 (81.7) | 33.3 (91.9) | 34.7 (94.5) | 36.7 (98.1) | 40.3 (104.5) | 38.6 (101.5) | 34.5 (94.1) | 30.3 (86.5) | 23.7 (74.7) | 19.6 (67.3) | 40.3 (104.5) |
| Mean daily maximum °C (°F) | −0.2 (31.6) | 4.8 (40.6) | 11.6 (52.9) | 19.2 (66.6) | 24.3 (75.7) | 28.6 (83.5) | 30.3 (86.5) | 28.8 (83.8) | 23.9 (75.0) | 16.9 (62.4) | 8.7 (47.7) | 1.5 (34.7) | 16.5 (61.8) |
| Daily mean °C (°F) | −9.3 (15.3) | −4.1 (24.6) | 3.3 (37.9) | 11.3 (52.3) | 16.7 (62.1) | 21.2 (70.2) | 23.0 (73.4) | 21.2 (70.2) | 15.6 (60.1) | 7.8 (46.0) | −0.4 (31.3) | −7.4 (18.7) | 8.2 (46.8) |
| Mean daily minimum °C (°F) | −16.1 (3.0) | −11.2 (11.8) | −3.7 (25.3) | 3.6 (38.5) | 9.0 (48.2) | 13.7 (56.7) | 16.0 (60.8) | 14.5 (58.1) | 9.2 (48.6) | 1.0 (33.8) | −6.5 (20.3) | −13.7 (7.3) | 1.3 (34.4) |
| Record low °C (°F) | −28.1 (−18.6) | −27.5 (−17.5) | −18.8 (−1.8) | −8.8 (16.2) | −4.5 (23.9) | 1.5 (34.7) | 6.7 (44.1) | 4.5 (40.1) | −1.1 (30.0) | −12.7 (9.1) | −19.3 (−2.7) | −28.2 (−18.8) | −28.2 (−18.8) |
| Average precipitation mm (inches) | 2.1 (0.08) | 1.3 (0.05) | 3.2 (0.13) | 5.6 (0.22) | 14.6 (0.57) | 20.3 (0.80) | 29.8 (1.17) | 25.3 (1.00) | 20.6 (0.81) | 5.3 (0.21) | 1.8 (0.07) | 1.9 (0.07) | 131.8 (5.18) |
| Average precipitation days (≥ 0.1 mm) | 3.3 | 1.8 | 2.8 | 3.3 | 5.1 | 6.7 | 8.6 | 7.9 | 6.0 | 2.8 | 2.1 | 2.7 | 53.1 |
| Average snowy days | 4.7 | 3.1 | 3.2 | 1.5 | 0.2 | 0 | 0 | 0 | 0 | 1.0 | 2.9 | 4.3 | 20.9 |
| Average relative humidity (%) | 55 | 44 | 40 | 35 | 39 | 45 | 52 | 55 | 58 | 54 | 56 | 59 | 49 |
| Mean monthly sunshine hours | 218.8 | 218.7 | 254.8 | 270.1 | 297.8 | 292.5 | 290.1 | 276.8 | 256.4 | 265.4 | 237.5 | 222.1 | 3,101 |
| Percentage possible sunshine | 72 | 71 | 68 | 67 | 67 | 66 | 65 | 66 | 70 | 78 | 80 | 76 | 71 |
Source 1: China Meteorological Administrationall-time March high
Source 2: Weather China

== Demographics ==
Zhangye has a total population of 1,199,515, only 260,000 being urban residents. There are 26 ethnic minorities other than Han represented including many Hui, Yugur and Tibetans.

== Transport ==
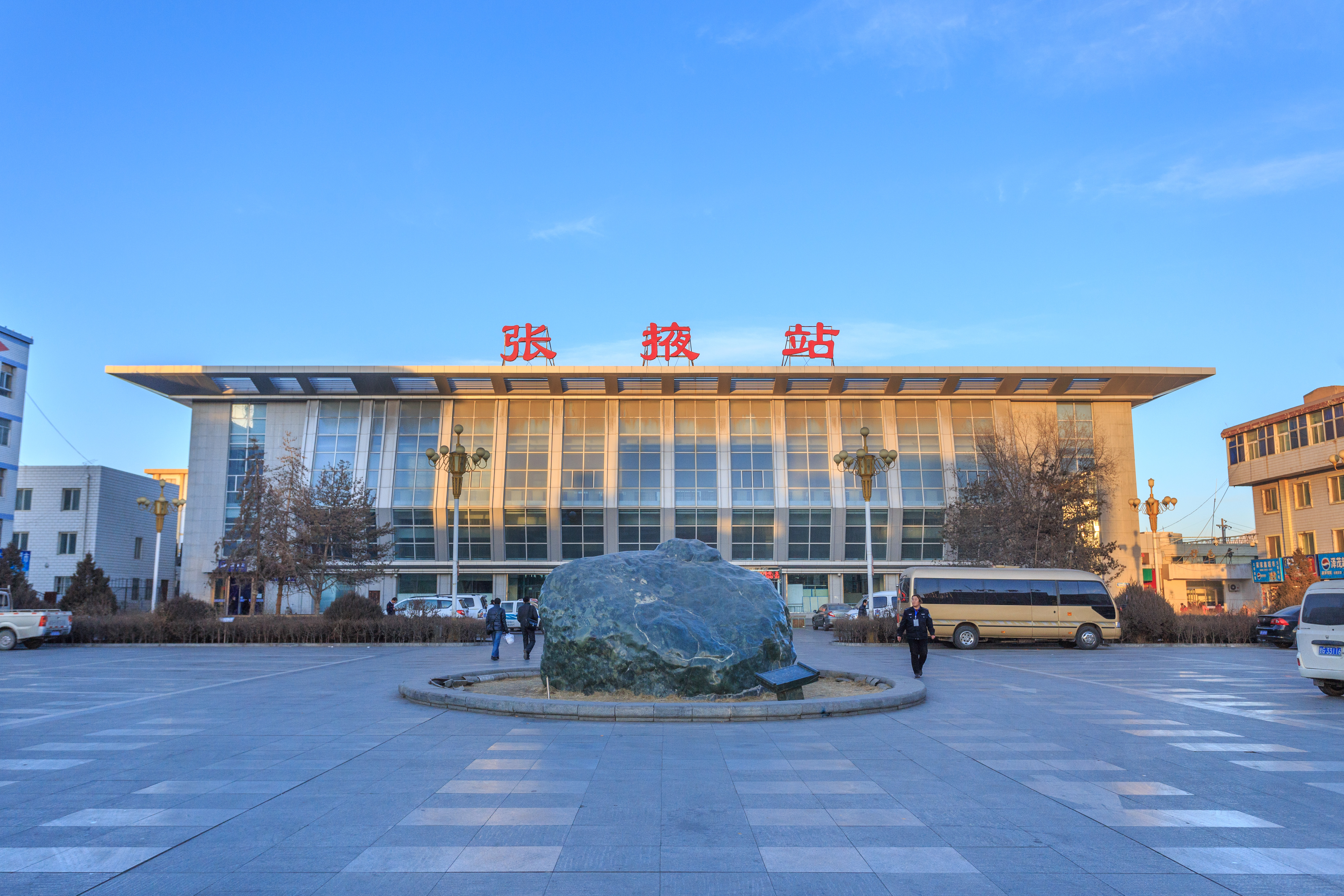
Zhangye railway station

Zhangye is served by China National Highways numbers G30 Expressway, 227 and 312.

Zhangye Railway Station is on the Lanzhou–Xinjiang Railway, located to the north east of the city. A high speed railway station has been constructed on the south west side of the city, Zhangye West Railway Station was opened on 26 December 2014 as part of the Lanzhou–Ürümqi High-Speed Railway.

Zhangye Ganzhou Airport, a combined civilian-military airport, opened in October 2011 with flights to Lanzhou and Xi'an.

== Economy ==
The 2002 GDP was 7.566 billion RMB, almost 9% growth over the previous year. Annual urban income was 5960 RMB, 10.4% growth from the previous year and rural income was 3092 RMB, up 5%.

=== Corn Seed Production Base ===
As a nationally significant hybrid corn seed production base, Zhangye hosts a "Corn Seed Processing Technology Integration Demonstration Base." This facility focuses on integrating advanced technologies in seed drying, sorting, and coating to ensure high-quality seed output for national agriculture.

== Education ==
Hexi University (河西学院) is located in Zhangye. Approximately 10,000 students are enrolled at the university.

== Sport ==
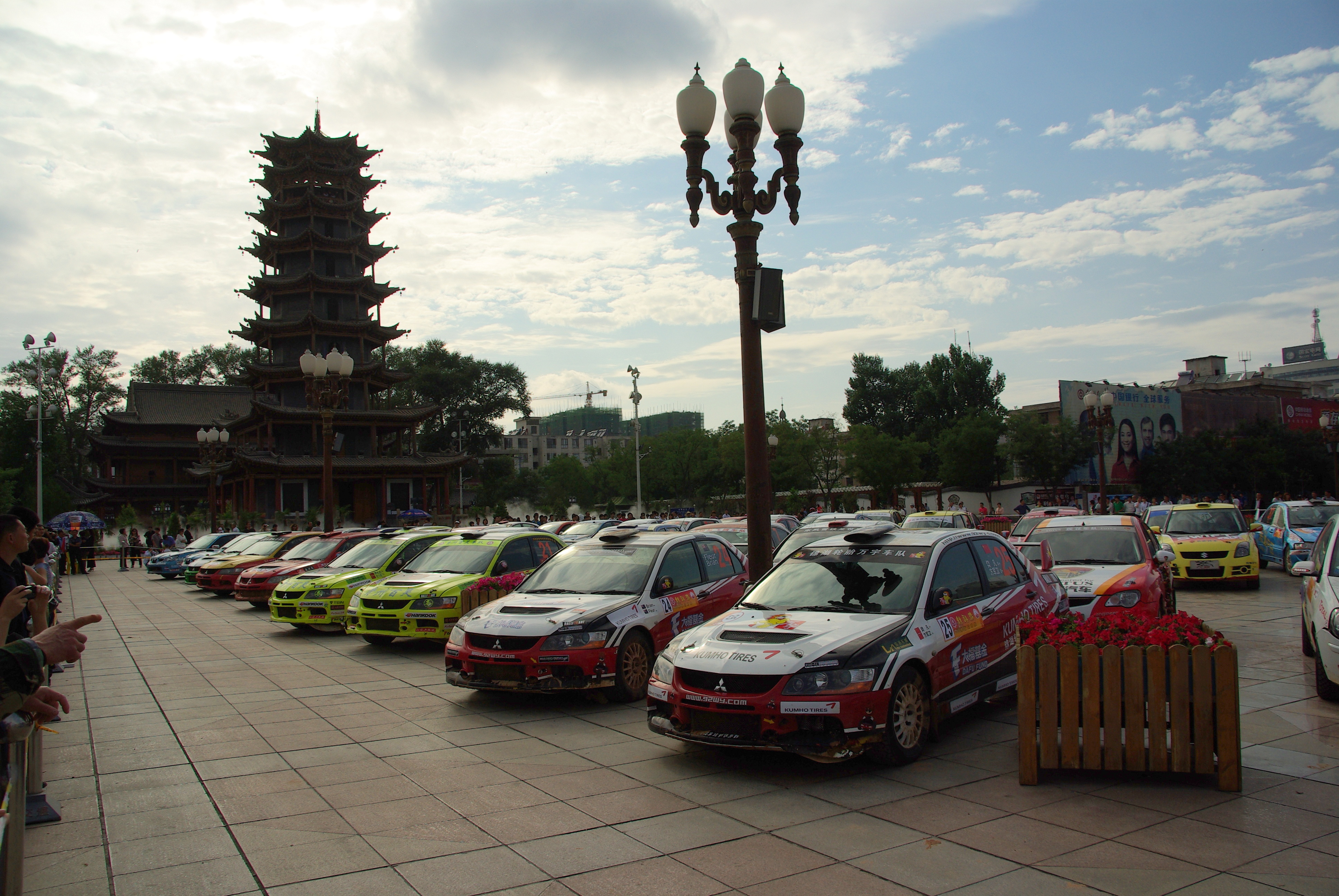
Parc Ferme at Zhangye International Rally 2011 in front of the Wooden Pagoda

Zhangye has hosted a round of the Chinese Rally Championship (CRC) since 2011. It is held on specially constructed roads across the deserts north and to the south of the city. The event attracts over 100 entries regularly, including international drivers. A stadium for side-by-side super special stages has also been constructed.

== Demographics ==
According to the Seventh National Census in 2020, the city's Permanent Population (hukou) was 1,131,016. Compared with a population of 1,199,515 at the time of the Sixth National Census in 2010, there were 68,499 fewer people, or an average annual decrease of 0.59 percent.
