= Shandan County =

Shandan County 山丹县
- County
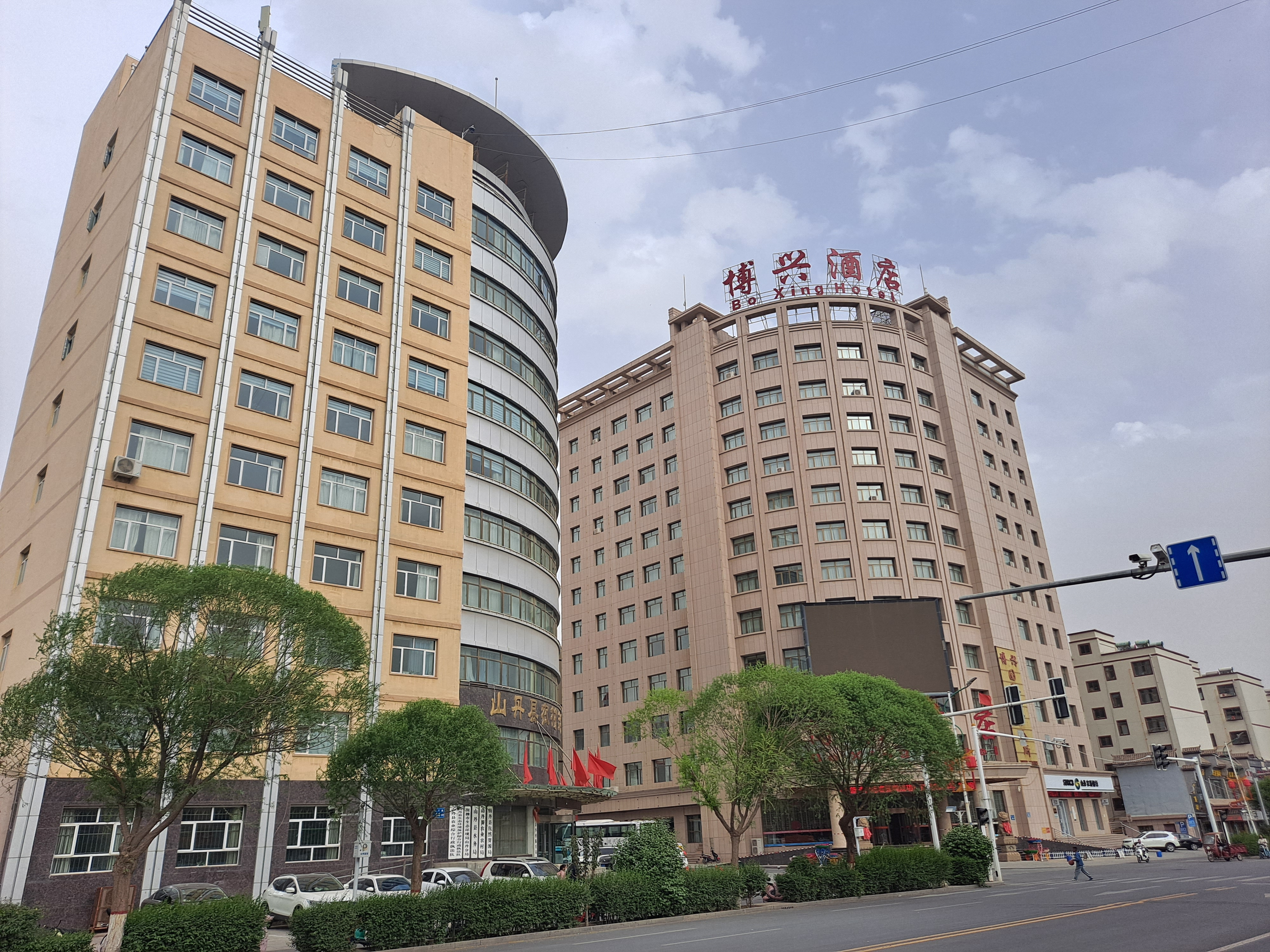
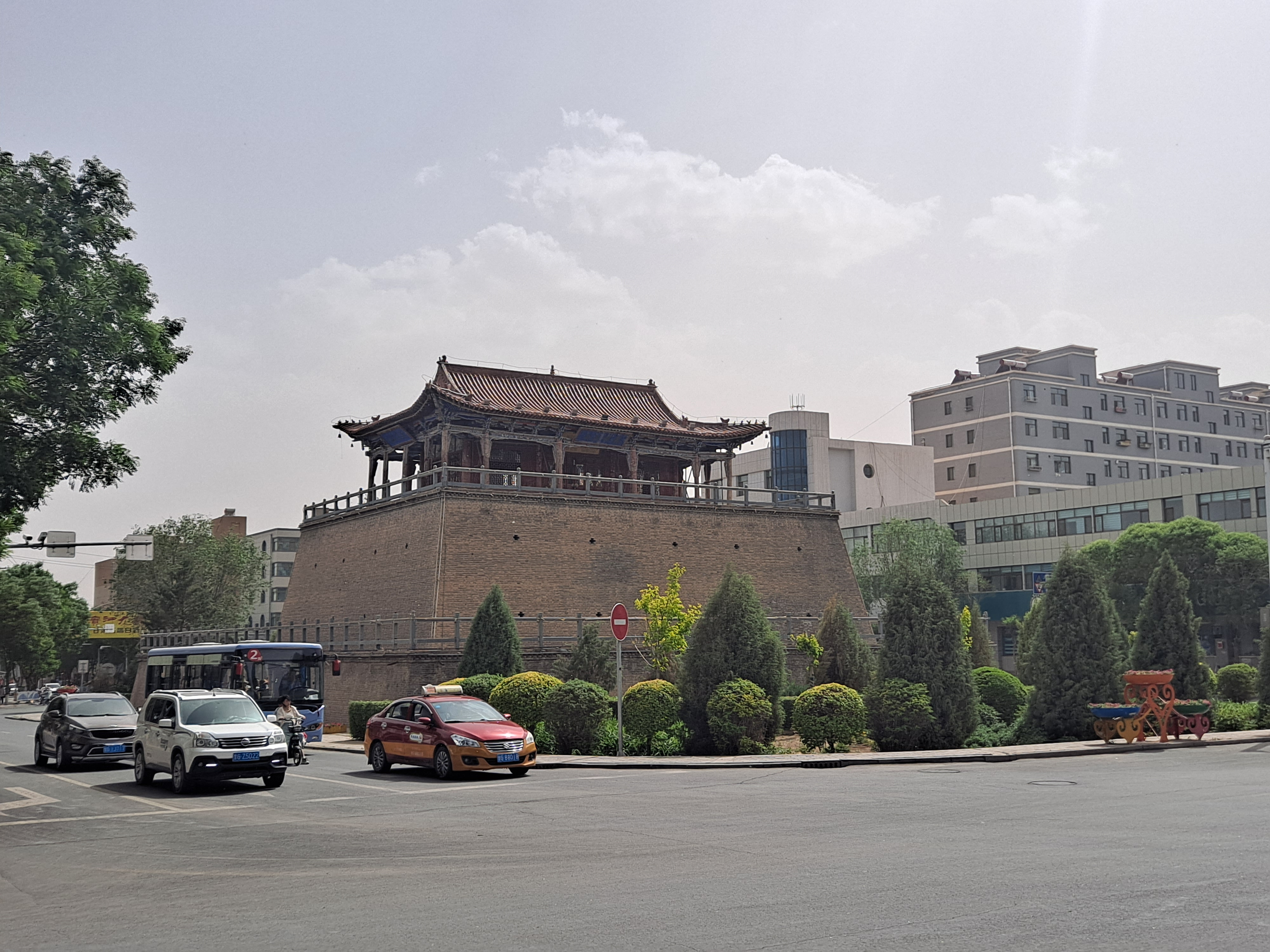
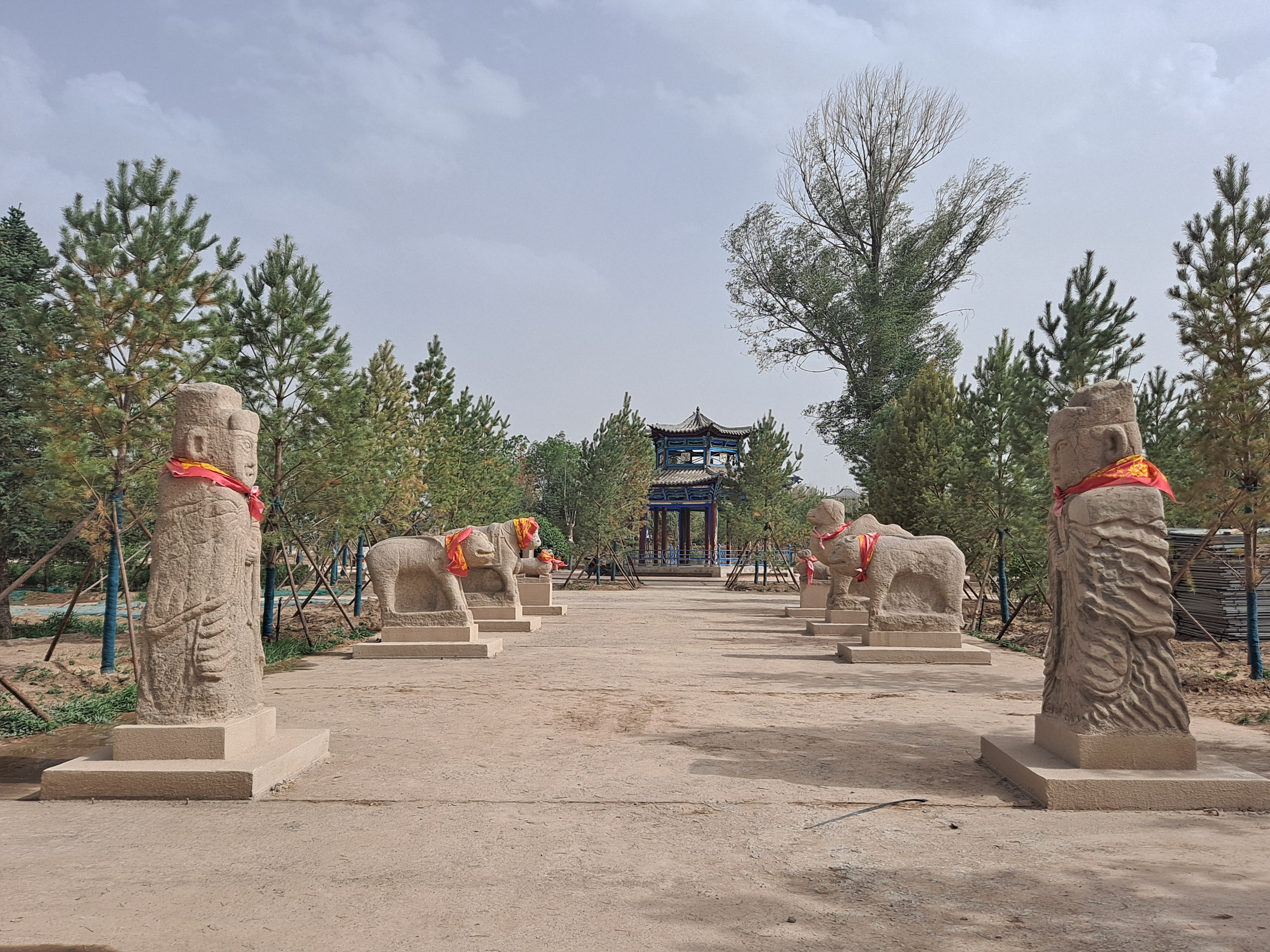
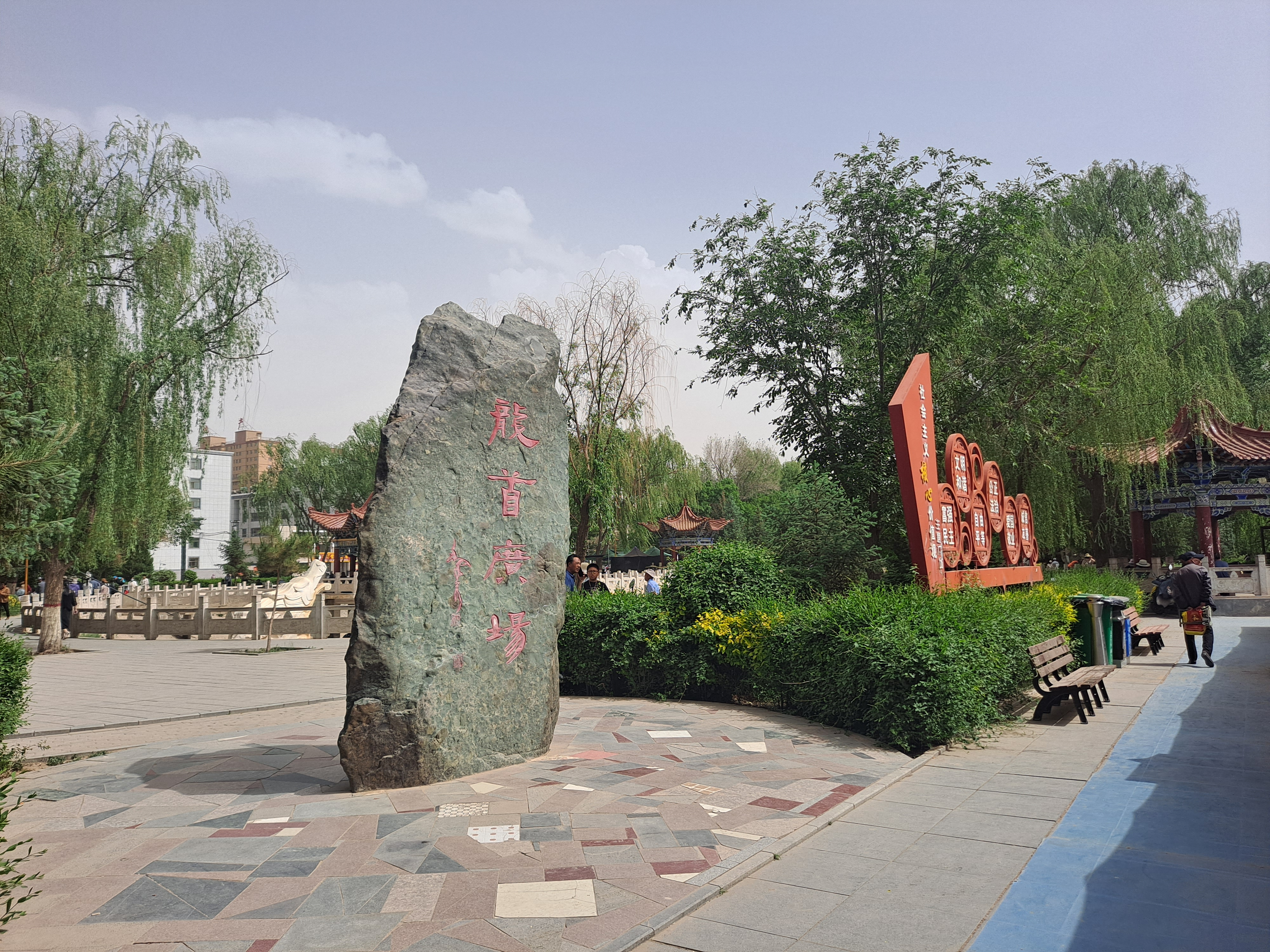
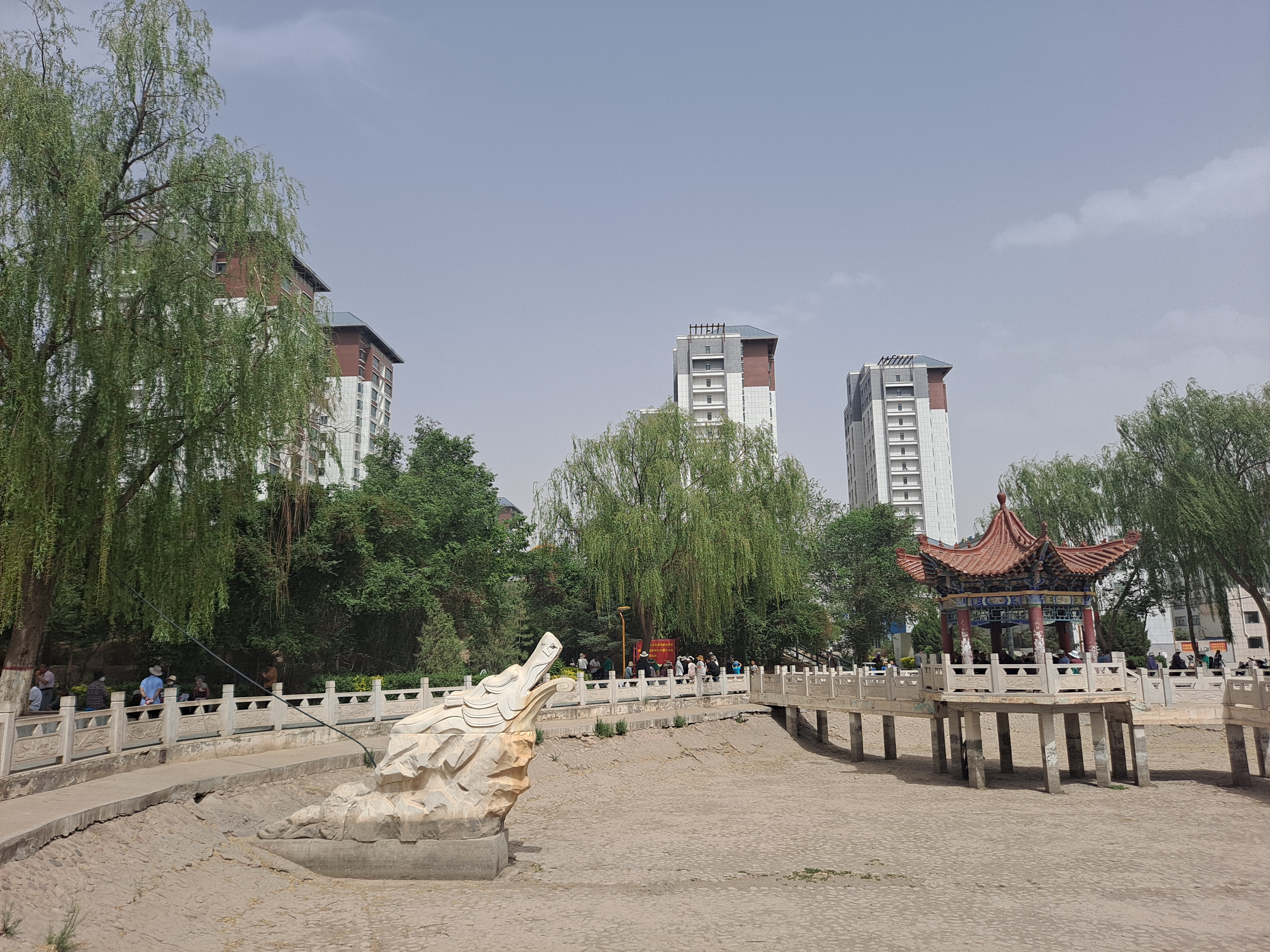

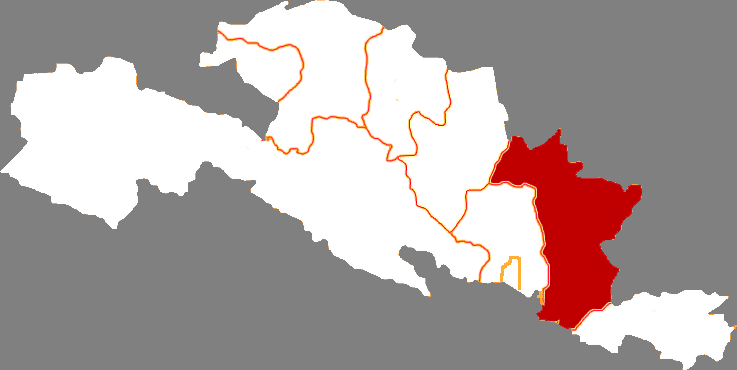
- Shandan in Zhangye

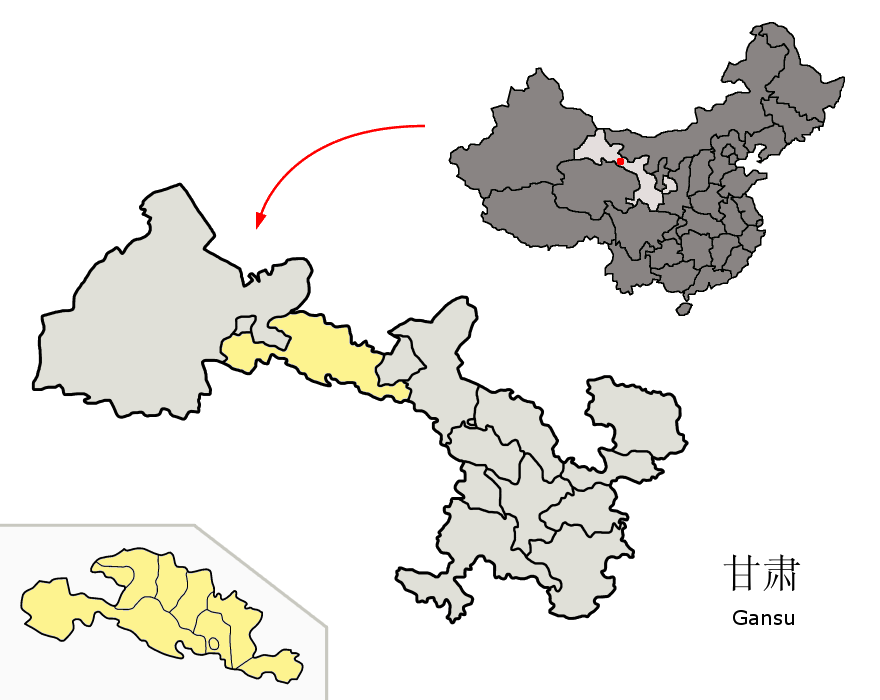
- Zhangye in Gansu
- Coordinates: 38°47′11″N 101°05′20″E
- Country: China
- Province: Gansu
- Prefecture-level city: Zhangye
- County seat: Qingquan

Area
  - Total: 5,402 km^{2} (2,086 sq mi)

Population (2018)
  - Total: 200,815
  - Density: 37.17/km^{2} (96.28/sq mi)
- Time zone: UTC+8 (CST)
- Postal code: 734100

Shandan County (Chinese: 山丹县) is a county in Gansu Province, China, bordering Inner Mongolia to the north and Qinghai to the south. It is under the administration of the prefecture-level city of Zhangye. It is an important site located on the ancient Silk Road. Its postal code is 734100, and in 1999 its population was 194,901 people. It is known for horses and pastures. Ancient Han people called the horses as 'heavenly western horses'. The region's lakes provide water to the animals on the pastures.

== Administrative divisions ==
Shandan County is divided to 6 towns, 2 townships and 2 others.

Towns

- Qingquan (清泉镇)
- Weiqi (位奇镇)
- Huocheng (霍城镇)
- Chenhu (陈户镇)
- Damaying (大马营镇)
- Dongle (东乐镇)

Townships

- Laojun (老军乡)
- Liqiao (李桥乡)

Others

- State-owned Shandan Farm (国营山丹农场)
- Shandan Racecourse of China Animal Husbandry Company (中牧公司山丹马场)

== Climate ==
Climate data for Shandan, elevation 1,766 m (5,794 ft), (1991–2020 normals, extremes 1991–present)
Month	Jan	Feb	Mar	Apr	May	Jun	Jul	Aug	Sep	Oct	Nov	Dec	Year
Record high °C (°F)	18.6 (65.5)	20.3 (68.5)	24.8 (76.6)	32.2 (90.0)	34.6 (94.3)	34.5 (94.1)	39.7 (103.5)	37.7 (99.9)	34.4 (93.9)	28.8 (83.8)	24.8 (76.6)	17.6 (63.7)	39.7 (103.5)
Mean daily maximum °C (°F)	−0.1 (31.8)	4.2 (39.6)	10.3 (50.5)	17.3 (63.1)	22.3 (72.1)	26.5 (79.7)	28.6 (83.5)	27.4 (81.3)	22.4 (72.3)	15.8 (60.4)	8.1 (46.6)	1.7 (35.1)	15.4 (59.7)
Daily mean °C (°F)	−8.6 (16.5)	−4.1 (24.6)	2.4 (36.3)	9.5 (49.1)	14.9 (58.8)	19.4 (66.9)	21.4 (70.5)	20.2 (68.4)	15.0 (59.0)	7.6 (45.7)	−0.3 (31.5)	−6.8 (19.8)	7.6 (45.6)
Mean daily minimum °C (°F)	−14.7 (5.5)	−10.4 (13.3)	−4.0 (24.8)	2.6 (36.7)	7.7 (45.9)	12.4 (54.3)	15.0 (59.0)	14.0 (57.2)	9.0 (48.2)	1.4 (34.5)	−6.2 (20.8)	−12.5 (9.5)	1.2 (34.1)
Record low °C (°F)	−26.4 (−15.5)	−24.8 (−12.6)	−21.3 (−6.3)	−11.8 (10.8)	−4.4 (24.1)	2.7 (36.9)	7.7 (45.9)	5.2 (41.4)	0.2 (32.4)	−11.1 (12.0)	−23.4 (−10.1)	−29.8 (−21.6)	−29.8 (−21.6)
Average precipitation mm (inches)	3.5 (0.14)	2.3 (0.09)	5.1 (0.20)	10.3 (0.41)	20.4 (0.80)	33.6 (1.32)	47.8 (1.88)	41.7 (1.64)	35.2 (1.39)	8.8 (0.35)	3.7 (0.15)	3.1 (0.12)	215.5 (8.49)
Average precipitation days (≥ 0.1 mm)	4.3	2.6	3.5	4.2	5.9	8.5	9.9	9.5	8.2	3.8	2.8	4.3	67.5
Average snowy days	6.0	4.3	4.3	2.4	0.4	0	0	0	0.1	1.9	3.9	5.7	29
Average relative humidity (%)	50	42	38	35	38	45	51	51	51	46	47	51	45
Mean monthly sunshine hours	207.2	202.7	236.2	248.8	272.6	262.2	262.0	253.8	234.1	243.4	221.4	206.9	2,851.3
Percentage possible sunshine	68	66	63	62	61	59	59	61	64	72	74	71	65
Source: China Meteorological Administration

== Transport ==
- China National Highway 312

== See also ==
- List of administrative divisions of Gansu
- Yanzhi Mountains
