= Ganzhou, Zhangye =

Ganzhou 甘州区
- District
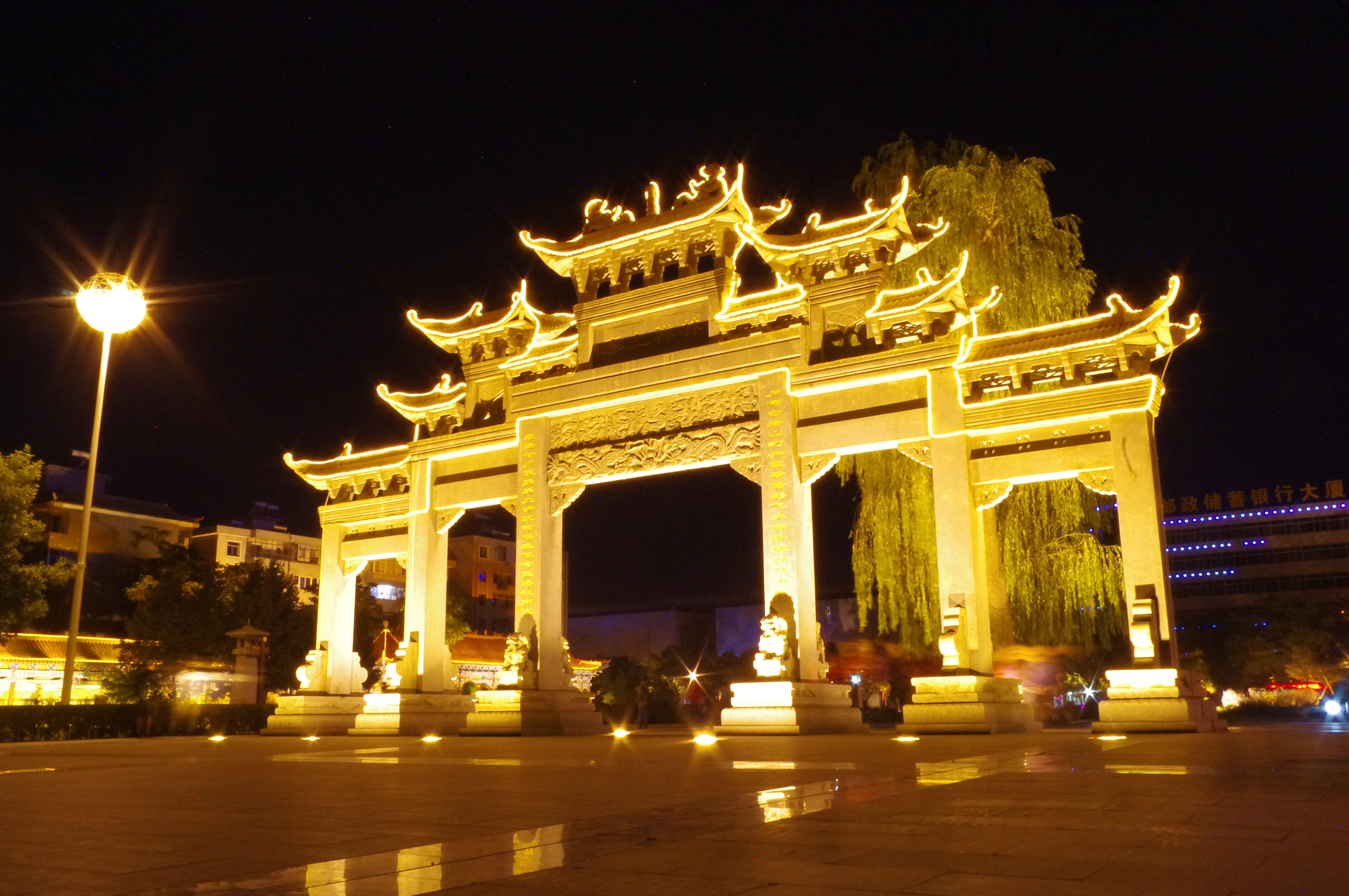
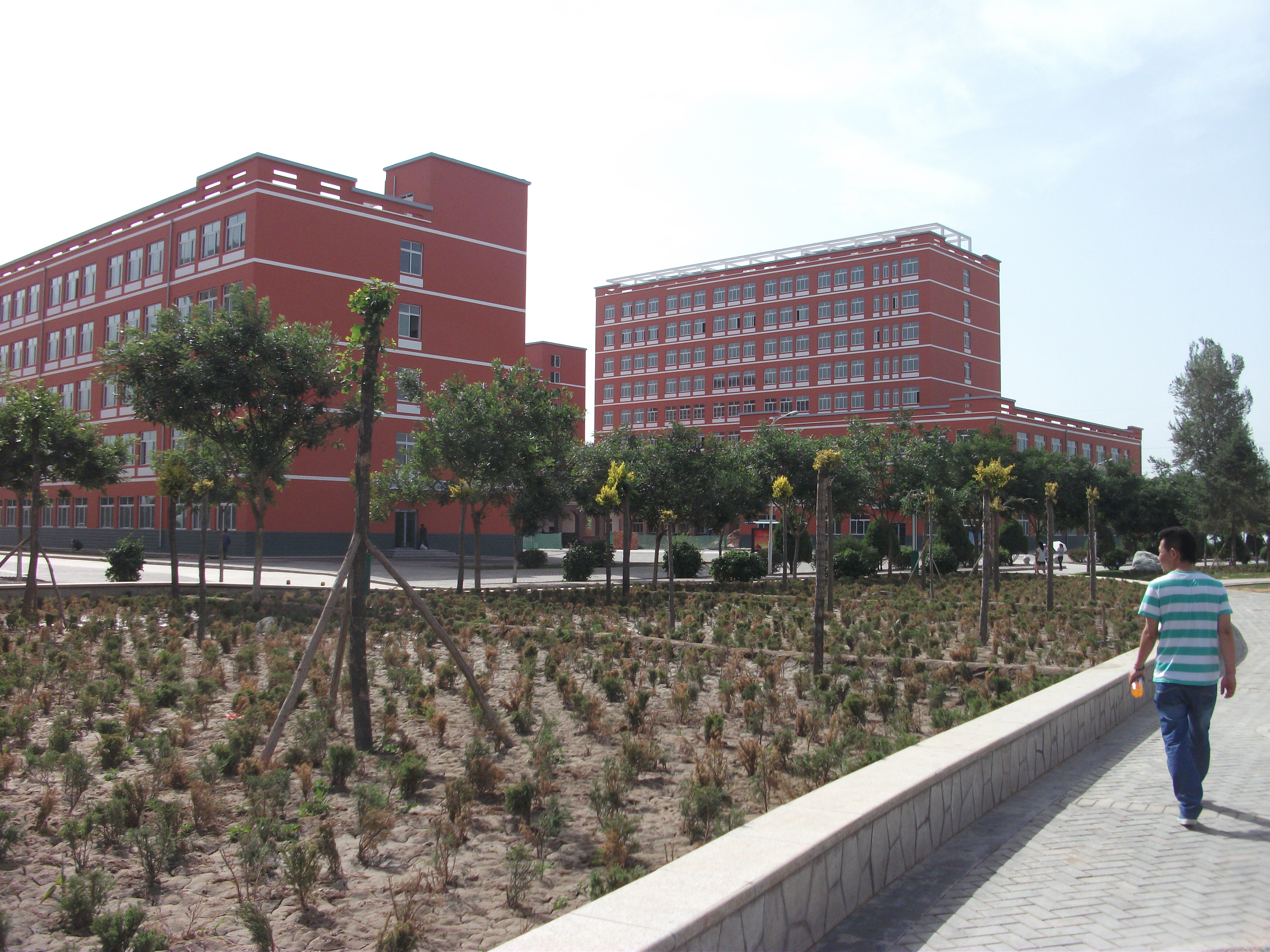
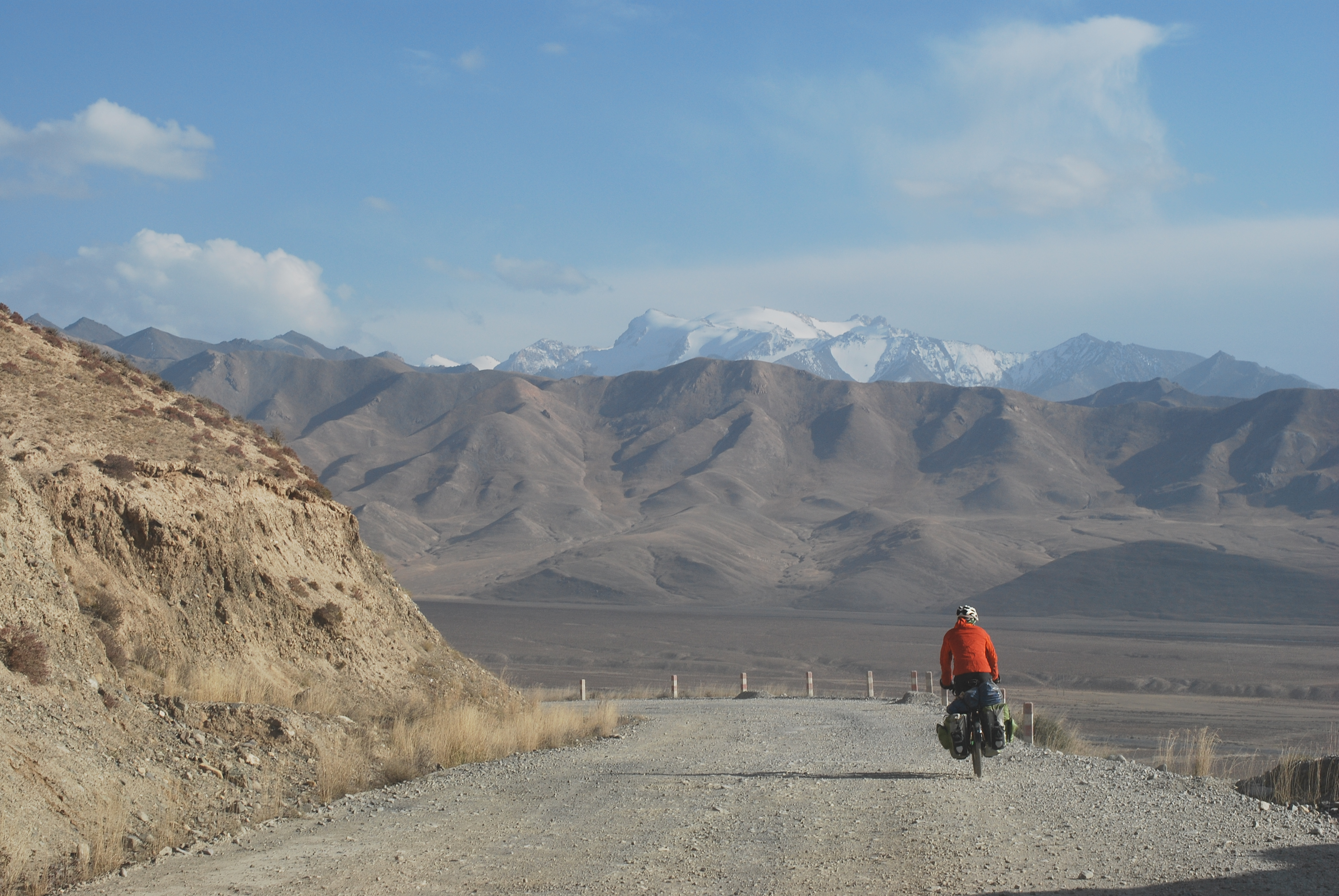
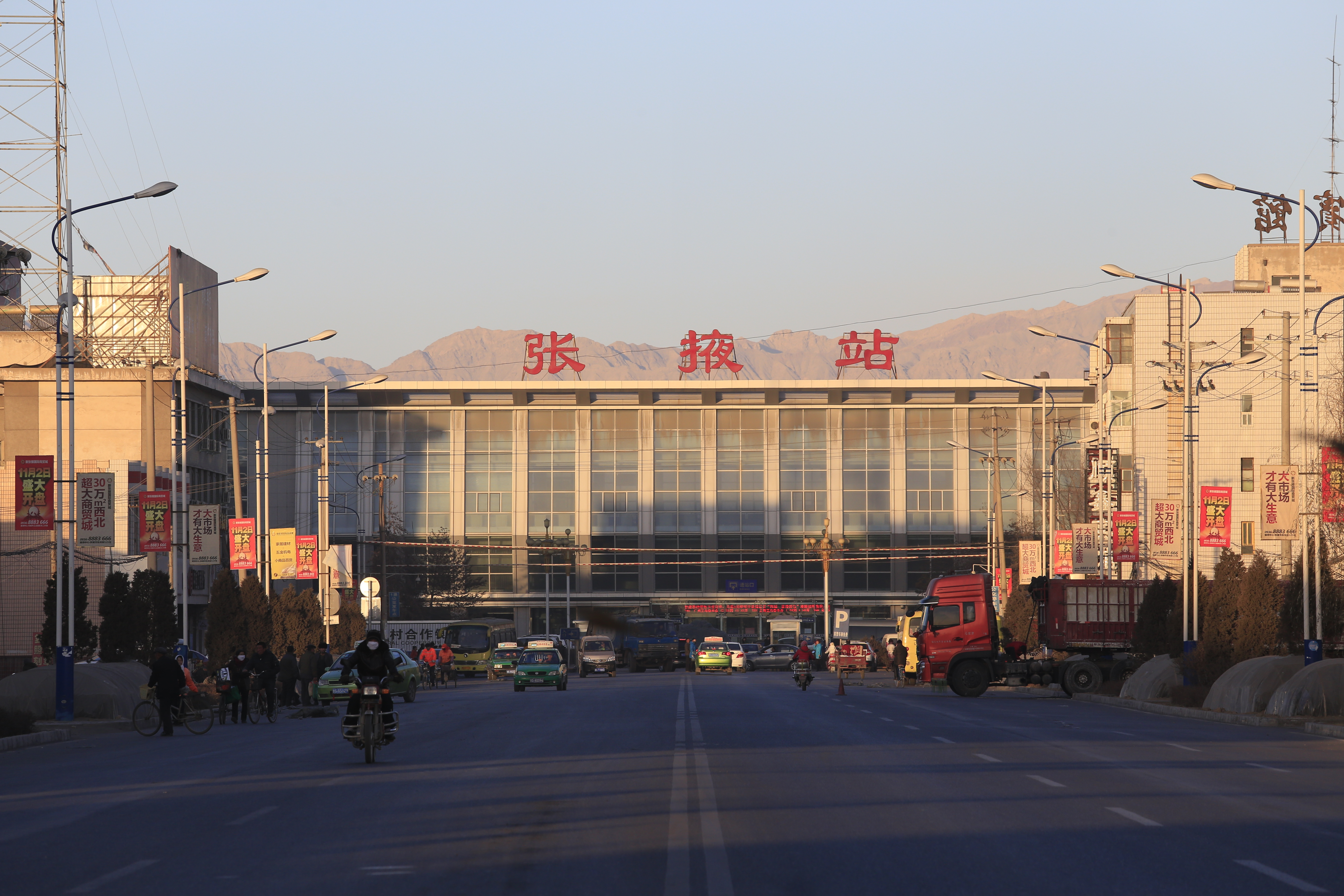
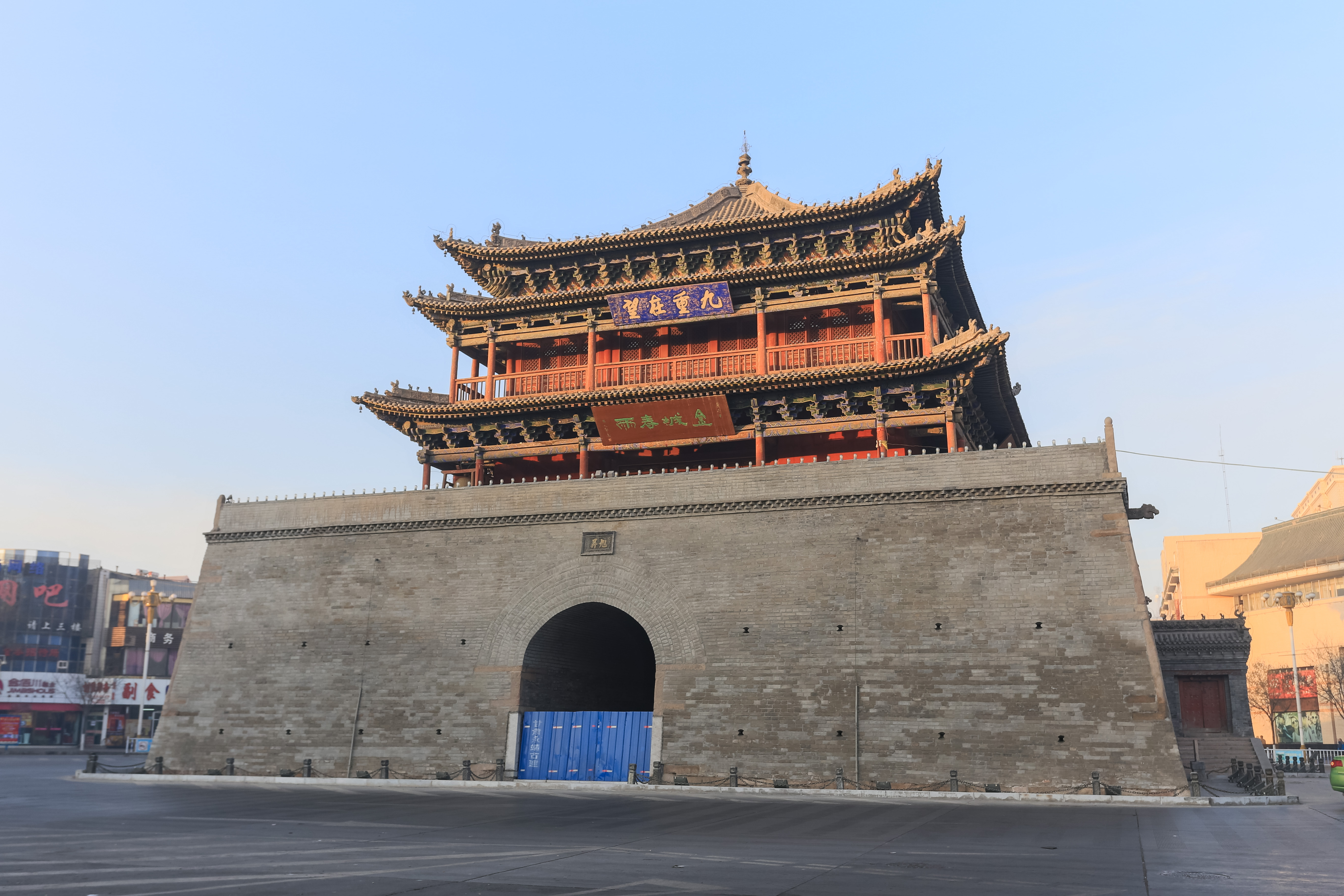
- Clockwise from top: Zen Forest Gate at night, view towards the July 1 Glacier, the Zhangye Bell Tower, Zhangya railway station, and dormitories at Hexi University.

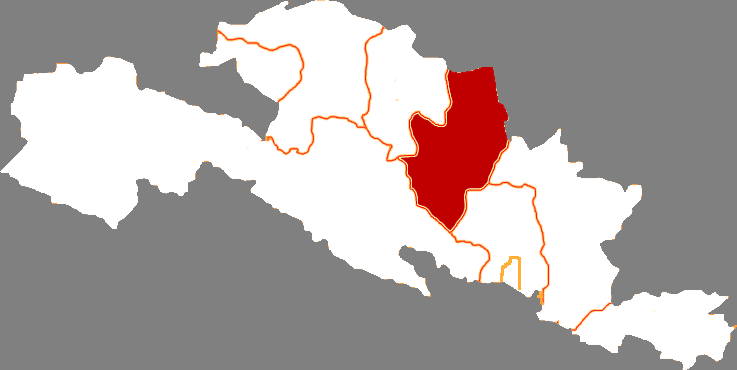
- Ganzhou in Zhangye

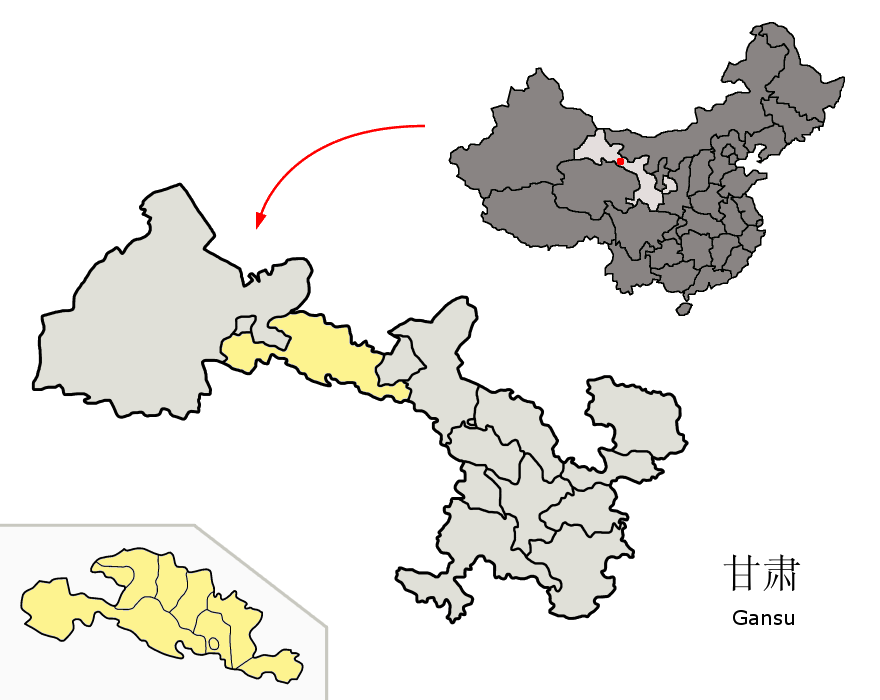
- Zhangye in Gansu

- Location in Gansu
- Coordinates: 38°56′38″N 100°24′54″E
- Country: China
- Province: Gansu
- Prefecture-level city: Zhangye
- District seat: Dongjie Subdistrict

Area
  - Total: 4,240 km^{2} (1,640 sq mi)

Population (2020)
  - Total: 519,096
  - Density: 122/km^{2} (317/sq mi)
- Time zone: UTC+8 (China Standard)
- Postal code: 734000
- Website: www.gsgz.gov.cn

Ganzhou, Zhangye
- Simplified Chinese: 甘州区
- Traditional Chinese: 甘州區
- Literal meaning: Ganzhou District
Transcriptions
Standard Mandarin
- Hanyu Pinyin: Gānzhōu Qū
- Wade–Giles: Kan-chou Ch'ü

Zhangye
- Simplified Chinese: 张掖
- Traditional Chinese: 張掖
Transcriptions
Standard Mandarin
- Hanyu Pinyin: Zhāngyè
- Wade–Giles: Chang-yeh

Former names
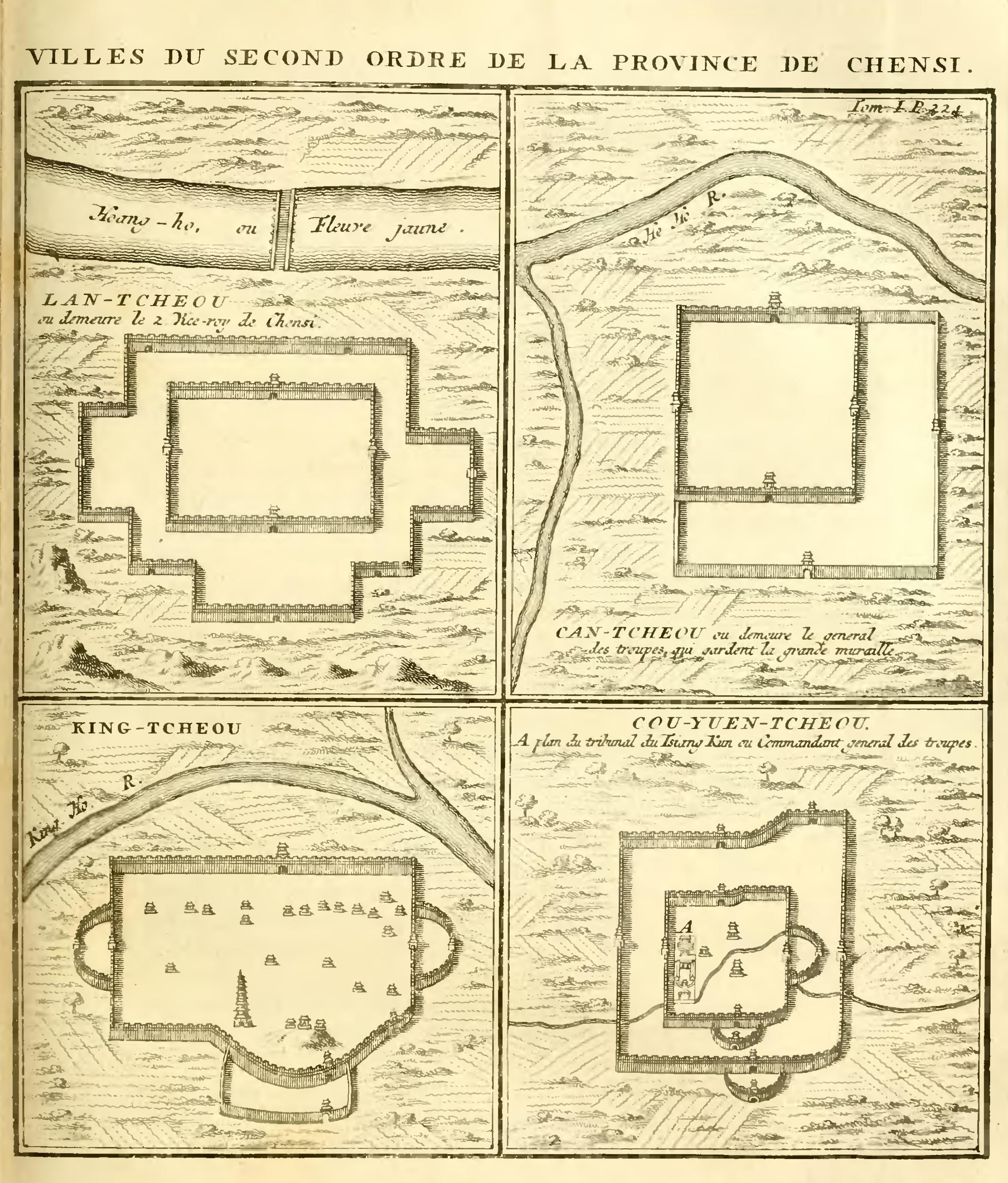
- "Can-tcheou" and other "second-order" towns of Shaan-Gan from Du Halde's 1736 Description of China, based on reports from Jesuit missionaries

Ganzhou
- Chinese: 甘州
- Literal meaning: Sweet [Spring(s)] Prefecture
Transcriptions
Standard Mandarin
- Hanyu Pinyin: Gānzhōu
- Wade–Giles: Kan-chou

Ganzhou District, formerly the separate city of Ganzhou or Kanchow, is a district in and the seat of the prefecture-level city of Zhangye in Gansu Province, China, bordering Inner Mongolia to the north and northeast. Ganzhou was an important outpost in western China and, along with Suzhou (now the central district of Jiuquan), it is the namesake of the province. As a settlement, it is now known as Zhangye after the prefecture it heads. The name "Gansu" originates as a combination of Ganzhou and Suzhou (肃州).

== Administrative divisions ==
Ganzhou District is divided to 5 subdistricts, 13 towns, 4 townships, 1 ethnic township and 1 other.

=== Subdistricts ===
- Dongjie Subdistrict (东街街道)
- Nanjie Subdistrict (南街街道)
- Xijie Subdistrict (西街街道)
- Beijie Subdistrict (北街街道)
- Huochezhan Subdistrict (火车站街道)

=== Towns ===
- Liangjiadun (梁家墩镇)
- Shangqin (上秦镇)
- Daman (大满镇)
- Shajing (沙井镇)
- Wujiang (乌江镇)
- Ganjun (甘浚镇)
- Xindun (新墩镇)
- Dangzhai (党寨镇)
- Jiantan (碱滩镇)
- Sanzha (三闸镇)
- Xiaoman (小满镇)
- Mingyong (明永镇)
- Chang'an (长安镇)

=== Townships ===
- Longqu Township (龙渠乡)
- Anyang Township (安阳乡)
- Huazhai Township (花寨乡)
- Jing'an Township (靖安乡)

=== Ethnic townships ===
- Pingshanhu Mongol Township (平山湖蒙古族乡)(ᠫᠢᠩ ᠱᠠᠨ ᠬᠤ ᠮᠣᠩᠭᠣᠯ ᠦᠨᠳᠦᠰᠦᠲᠡᠨ ᠤ ᠰᠢᠶᠠᠩ, (piŋ šan ꭓu moŋɣol ündüsüten-u šiyaŋ))

=== Others ===
- Zhangye Economic and Technological Development Zone (张掖经济技术开发区)

== See also ==
- List of administrative divisions of Gansu
