= Linze County =

Linze County 临泽县
- County
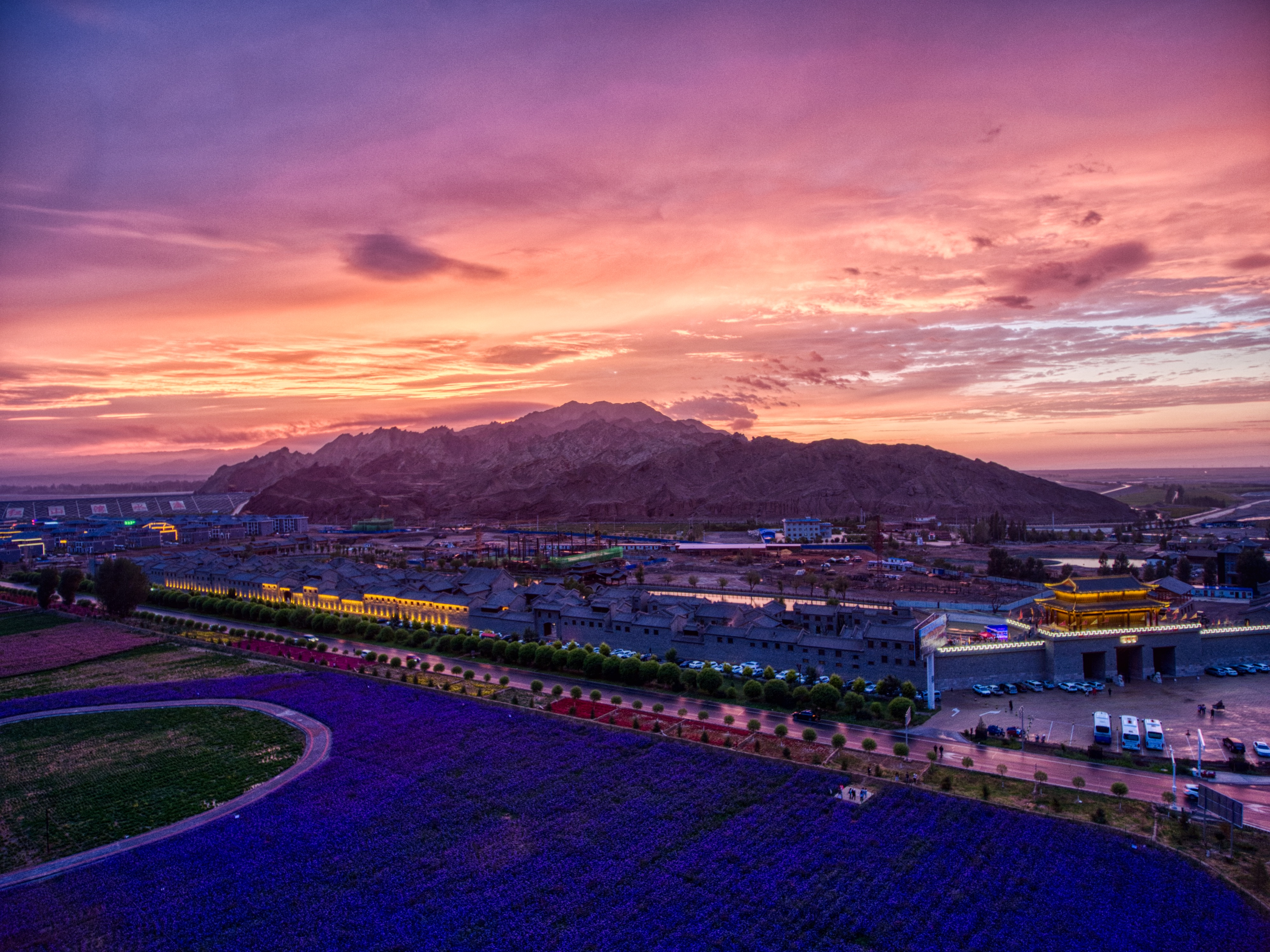

- Location of the seat in Gansu
- Coordinates: 39°18′N 100°10′E
- Country: China
- Province: Gansu
- Prefecture-level city: Zhangye
- County seat: Shahe

Area
  - Total: 2,729 km^{2} (1,054 sq mi)

Population (2018)
  - Total: 149,523
  - Density: 54.79/km^{2} (141.9/sq mi)
- Time zone: UTC+8 (China Standard)
- Postal code: 734200
- Website: www.gslz.gov.cn

Linze County (simplified Chinese: 临泽县; traditional Chinese: 臨澤縣; pinyin: Línzé Xiàn) is one of the 58 counties of Gansu province, China, bordering Inner Mongolia to the northeast. It is under the administration of the prefecture-level city of Zhangye. Its postal code is 734200, and in 1999 its population was 144,613 people.

== Administrative divisions ==
Linze County is divided to 7 towns and 6 others.

Towns

- Shahe (沙河镇)
- Xinhua (新华镇)
- Liaoquan (蓼泉镇)
- Pingchuan (平川镇)
- Banqiao (板桥镇)
- Ya'nuan (鸭暖镇)
- Nijiaying (倪家营镇)

Others

- State-owned Linze Farm (国营临泽农场)
- Wuquan Forest Farm (五泉林场)
- Shahe Forest Farm (沙河林场)
- Koizumizi Sand Control Station (小泉子治沙站)
- Gardening field (园艺场)
- Seed breeding ground (良种繁殖场)

== Climate ==
Climate data for Linze, elevation 1,454 m (4,770 ft), (1991–2020 normals, extremes 1972–present)
Month	Jan	Feb	Mar	Apr	May	Jun	Jul	Aug	Sep	Oct	Nov	Dec	Year
Record high °C (°F)	16.0 (60.8)	22.0 (71.6)	26.1 (79.0)	33.5 (92.3)	35.3 (95.5)	36.2 (97.2)	39.2 (102.6)	39.1 (102.4)	33.8 (92.8)	29.6 (85.3)	21.7 (71.1)	19.6 (67.3)	39.2 (102.6)
Mean daily maximum °C (°F)	−0.7 (30.7)	4.6 (40.3)	11.6 (52.9)	19.3 (66.7)	24.6 (76.3)	28.7 (83.7)	30.4 (86.7)	28.9 (84.0)	23.9 (75.0)	17.0 (62.6)	8.4 (47.1)	1.0 (33.8)	16.5 (61.7)
Daily mean °C (°F)	−8.5 (16.7)	−3.4 (25.9)	3.8 (38.8)	11.6 (52.9)	17.1 (62.8)	21.5 (70.7)	23.1 (73.6)	21.3 (70.3)	15.7 (60.3)	8.1 (46.6)	0.4 (32.7)	−6.7 (19.9)	8.7 (47.6)
Mean daily minimum °C (°F)	−14.6 (5.7)	−9.8 (14.4)	−2.8 (27.0)	4.4 (39.9)	9.7 (49.5)	14.4 (57.9)	16.7 (62.1)	15.1 (59.2)	9.7 (49.5)	1.7 (35.1)	−5.2 (22.6)	−12.3 (9.9)	2.2 (36.1)
Record low °C (°F)	−29.1 (−20.4)	−27.7 (−17.9)	−22.4 (−8.3)	−7.8 (18.0)	−4.4 (24.1)	5.5 (41.9)	7.7 (45.9)	5.3 (41.5)	−0.5 (31.1)	−14.7 (5.5)	−17.8 (0.0)	−28.1 (−18.6)	−29.1 (−20.4)
Average precipitation mm (inches)	2.2 (0.09)	1.3 (0.05)	4.0 (0.16)	5.3 (0.21)	13.0 (0.51)	17.2 (0.68)	26.7 (1.05)	22.5 (0.89)	17.5 (0.69)	4.9 (0.19)	1.9 (0.07)	2.4 (0.09)	118.9 (4.68)
Average precipitation days (≥ 0.1 mm)	2.7	1.7	2.6	2.9	4.8	5.9	8.0	7.5	5.1	2.2	1.8	2.5	47.7
Average snowy days	3.9	2.5	3.2	1.2	0.2	0	0	0	0	0.8	2.8	3.6	18.2
Average relative humidity (%)	54	42	38	32	36	44	52	56	58	52	54	57	48
Mean monthly sunshine hours	218.5	220.8	256.0	270.5	294.4	285.7	276.7	269.7	248.7	261.4	233.1	217.0	3,052.5
Percentage possible sunshine	72	72	68	68	66	64	62	64	68	77	79	74	70
Source: China Meteorological Administrationall-time extreme temperatureall-time July High

== Transport ==
- China National Highway 312

== See also ==
- List of administrative divisions of Gansu
