= Zhangye West railway station =

Railway station in Zhangye, China

Zhangyexi 张掖西
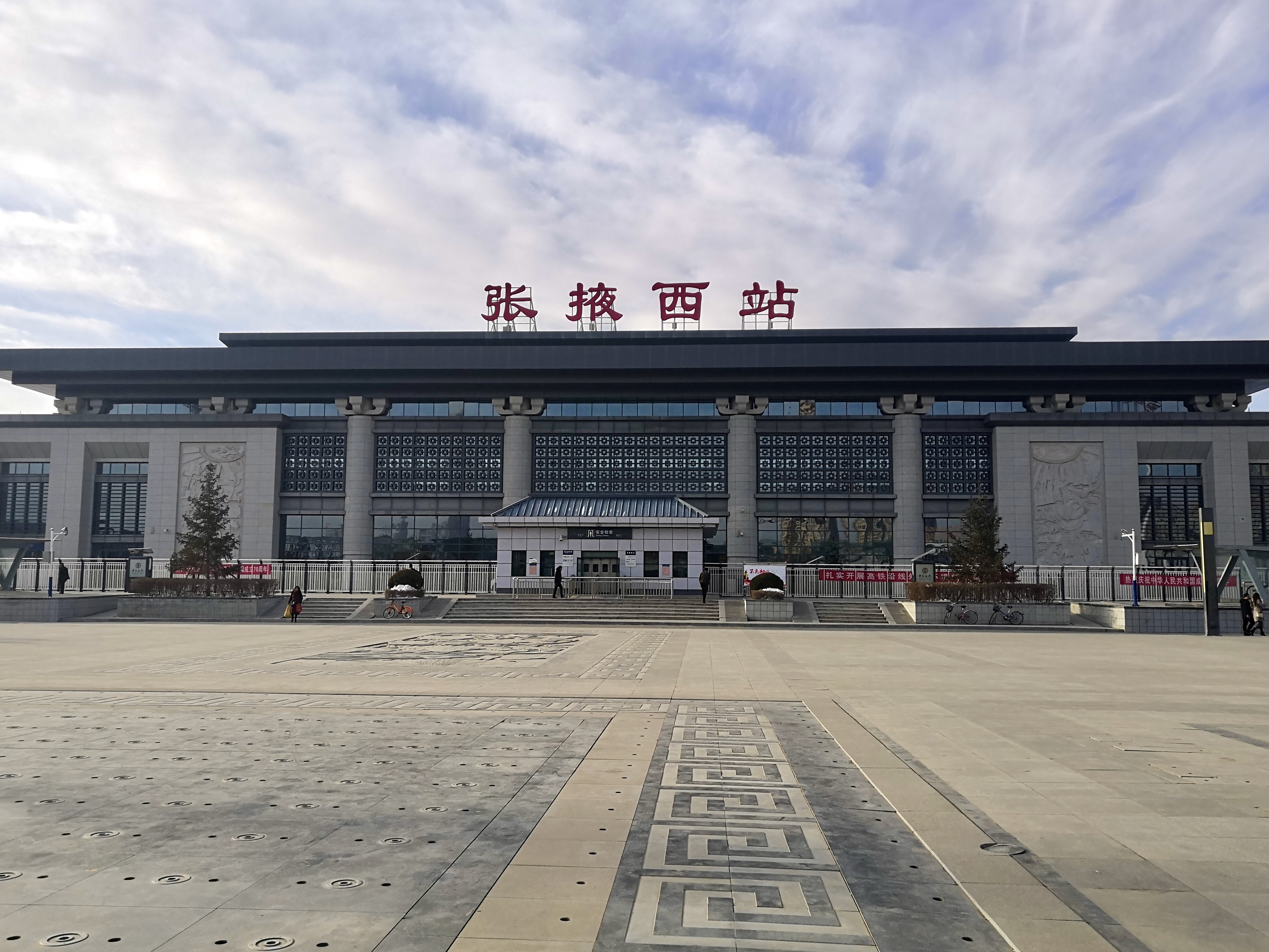

General information
- Other names: Zhangye Xi
- Location: Danxia West Road; Danxia Xi Lu, Ganzhou District, Zhangye, Gansu; China
- Coordinates: 38°55′19.9″N 100°25′43.41″E
- Operated by: Ministry of Railways of the People's Republic of China
- Line(s): Lanzhou–Xinjiang high-speed railway Lanzhou–Zhangye high-speed railway (under construction)
- Platforms: 5 (1 side, 2 island)

History
- Opened: December 26, 2014
Location

Zhangye West railway station (simplified Chinese: 张掖西站; traditional Chinese: 張掖西站; pinyin: Zhāngyē Xī Zhàn) is a railway station located in China's Gansu Province, Zhangye City, Ganzhou District. It was put into operation on December 26, 2014. It serves the Lanzhou–Xinjiang High-Speed Railway with High Speed services between Lanzhou and Urumqi and conventional services connecting Urumqi to various cities in Eastern and South Western China. It is the second railway station serving Zhangye, with Zhangye railway station which serves the conventional LanXin Railway.

== Scheduled services ==
There are 22 trains scheduled as of March 19, 2015

Train number	Originating station	Destination station	Arrival time	Departure time	Train type
Z106	Urumqi South	Jinan	07:39	07:42	Fast AC Express
Z136	Urumqi South	Guangzhou	09:14	09:20	Fast AC Express
K544	Urumqi South	Chongqing North	09:33	9:35	AC Express
D2744	Jiayuguan South	Lanzhou West	09:57	09:59	EMU
D2741	Lanzhou West	Jiayuguan South	10:49	10:51	EMU
D2701	Lanzhou West	Urumqi South	11:40	11:43	EMU
D2742	Jiayuguan South	Lanzhou West	13:58	14:01	EMU
D2703	Lanzhou West	Urumqi South	14:04	14:06	EMU
K2059	Chengdu	Urumqi South	14:49	14:54	AC Express
K1352	Urumqi South	Lianyangang East	15:55	15:59	AC Express
K2060	Urumqi South	Chengdu	16:18	16:25	AC Express
D2745	Lanzhou West	Jiayuguan South	16:52	16:55	EMU
K543	Chongqing North	Urumqi South	17:40	17:42	AC Express
D2704	Urumqi South	Lanzhou West	17:56	17:58	EMU
D2702	Urumqi South	Lanzhou West	19:19	19:21	EMU
Z135	Guangzhou	Urumqi South	19:28	19:31	Fast AC Express
D2716	Urumqi South	Xining	19:35	19:39	EMU
D2746	Jiayuguan South	Lanzhou West	20:12	20:14	EMU
D2743	Lanzhou West	Jiayuguan South	20:39	20:41	EMU
K1351	Lianyungang East	Urumqi South	21:25	21:27	AC Express
Z41	Shanghai	Urumqi South	22:23	22:25	Fast AC Express
Z105	Jinan	Urumqi South	23:00	23:03	Fast AC Express
