= Turpan North railway station =

Railway station in Turpan, China

Turpan North 吐鲁番北
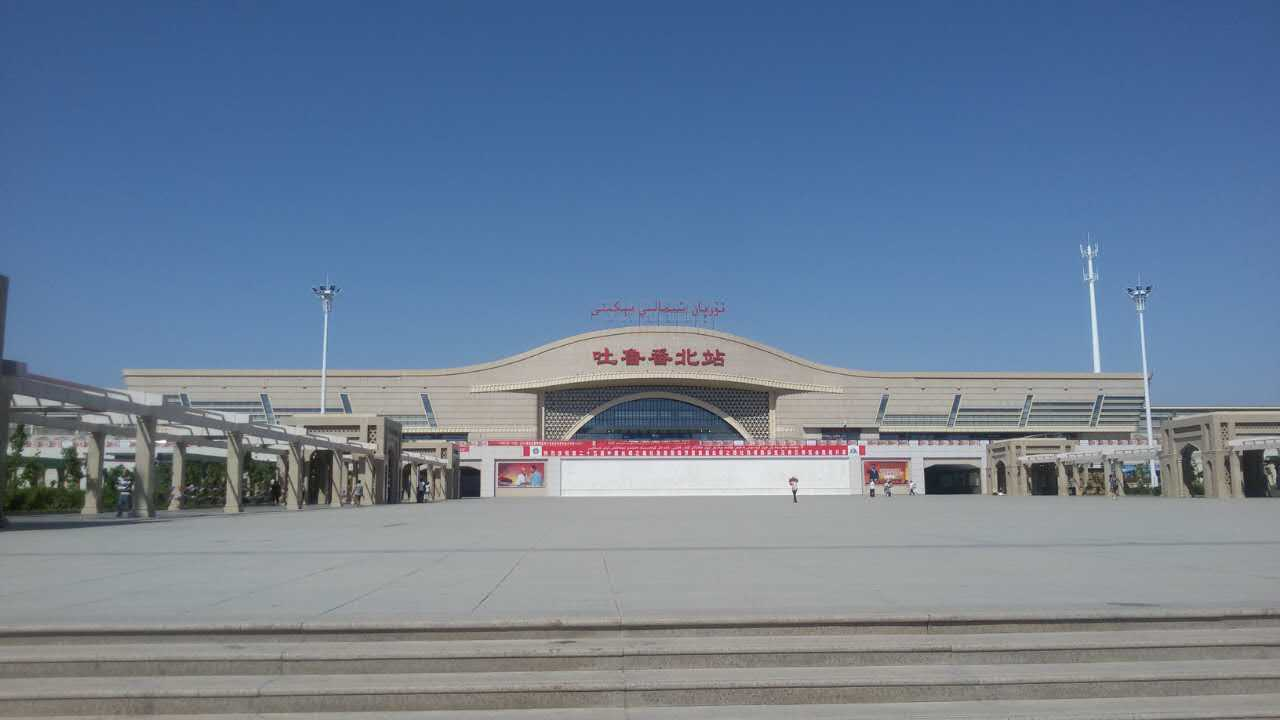

General information
- Location: Gaochang District, Turpan, Xinjiang; China
- Coordinates: 43.0214°N 89.1079°E
- Operated by: China Railway Ürümqi Group
- Line: Lanzhou–Xinjiang high-speed railway
- Connections: Turpan Jiaohe Airport

History
- Opened: November 16, 2014; 11 years ago
Location
- Location in Turpan

Turpan North railway station (Chinese: 吐鲁番北站; pinyin: Tǔlǔfān Běizhàn) is a railway station on the Lanzhou–Xinjiang high-speed railway in Turpan, Xinjiang, China. It is operated by China Railway Ürümqi Group.

The station opened on November 16, 2014 as one of five stations on the 530-kilometer (330 mi) Ürümqi South–Hami section, the first part of the line and the first high-speed railway to operate in Xinjiang. The inaugural train to call there, service D8602, ran from Ürümqi South toward Hami that day. The full Lanzhou–Xinjiang high-speed railway opened on December 26, 2014.

== Air–rail interchange ==
The station lies less than 1 kilometer (0.62 mi) from Turpan Jiaohe Airport, which serves as a diversion airport for Ürümqi Tianshan International Airport; its opening introduced an air–rail interchange that brought Turpan within an hour of Ürümqi by rail. In 2022 a 648-meter (2,126 ft) air–rail corridor was completed, connecting the airport terminal, the station and a tourism service center. The airport stands about 27 meters (89 ft) above the station, and passengers transfer through an automated walkway and an underground tunnel.

Preceding station	CR	Following station
Ürümqi South	Lanzhou–Xinjiang high-speed railway	Shanshan North
