= 2014 Ürümqi attack =

2014 Ürümqi attack may refer to either of two attacks in the Chinese city of Ürümqi, Xinjiang:

- April 2014 Ürümqi attack
- May 2014 Ürümqi attack
