= Xinjiang Museum =

National museum in Ürümqi, Xinjiang, China

Xinjiang Uygur Autonomous Region Museum
- 新疆维吾尔自治区博物馆 (Chinese) شىنجاڭ ئۇيغۇر ئاپتونوم رايونلۇق مۇزېي (Uyghur)
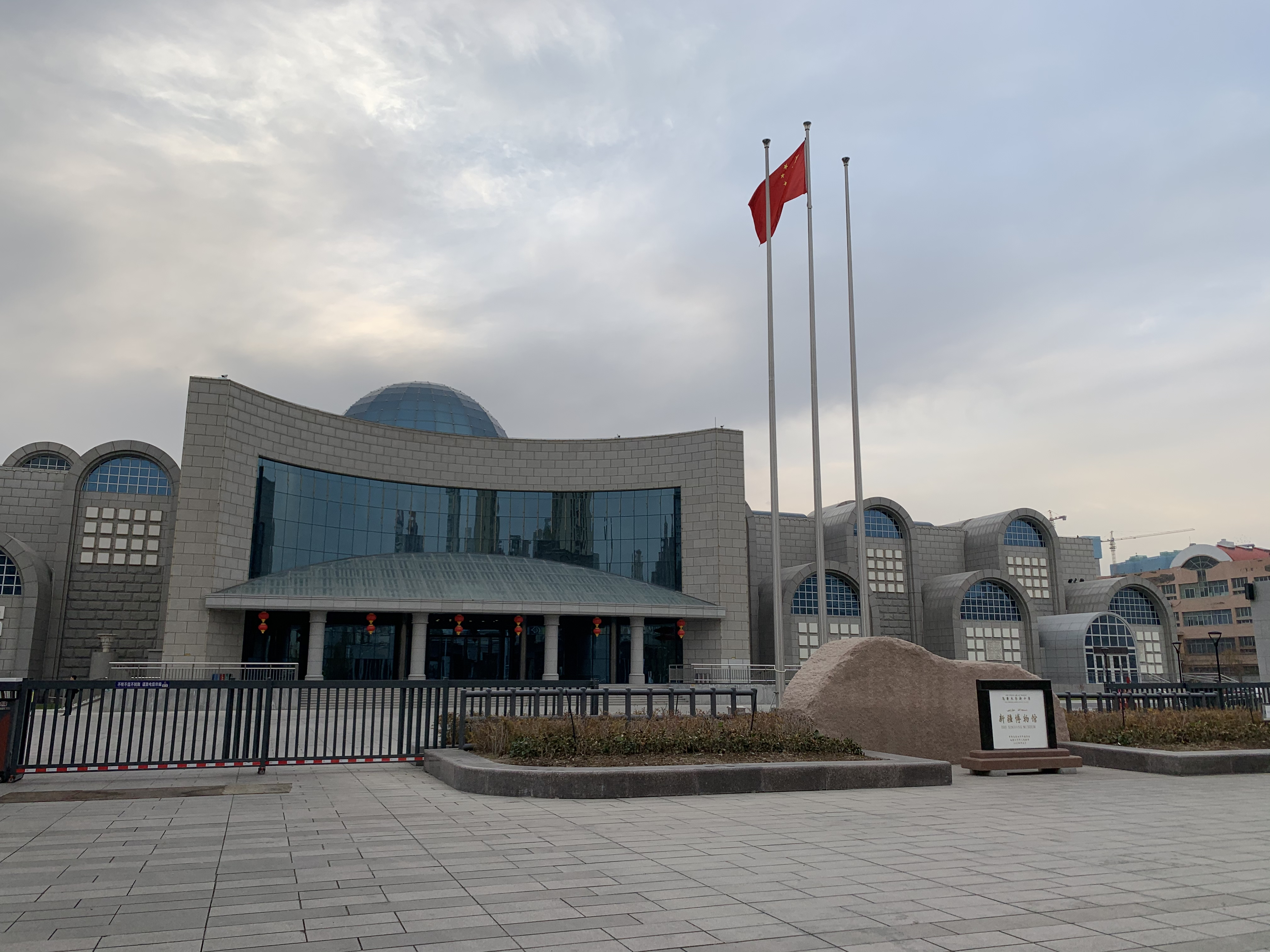
- Location: 581 Xibei Road, Saybag District, Ürümqi, Xinjiang, China
- Coordinates: 43°49′10.32″N 87°35′02.29″E

The Xinjiang Uygur Autonomous Region Museum, or simply the Xinjiang Museum, is a museum in the Saybag District of Ürümqi, the capital of Xinjiang, China. It holds over 40,000 items of various cultural relics and specimens, including 381 national first-grade cultural relics. In May 2008, the Xinjiang Museum was included in the first batch of the national first-grade museums of China.

== General ==
The Xinjiang Museum was established in August 1959. The current museum building was built and opened for public on September 20, 2005.

== Exhibits ==
The museum has been set up to show the four major exhibits: "Recover the Western Region's Glory of Yesterday – the exhibit of the historical cultural relics in Xinjiang", "the exhibit of Xinjiang's ethnic customs", "The Mummies of the Immortal World – the exhibit of the ancient mummies of Xinjiang", "The Historical Monuments – the exhibit of Xinjiang's revolutionary history".

== Gallery ==
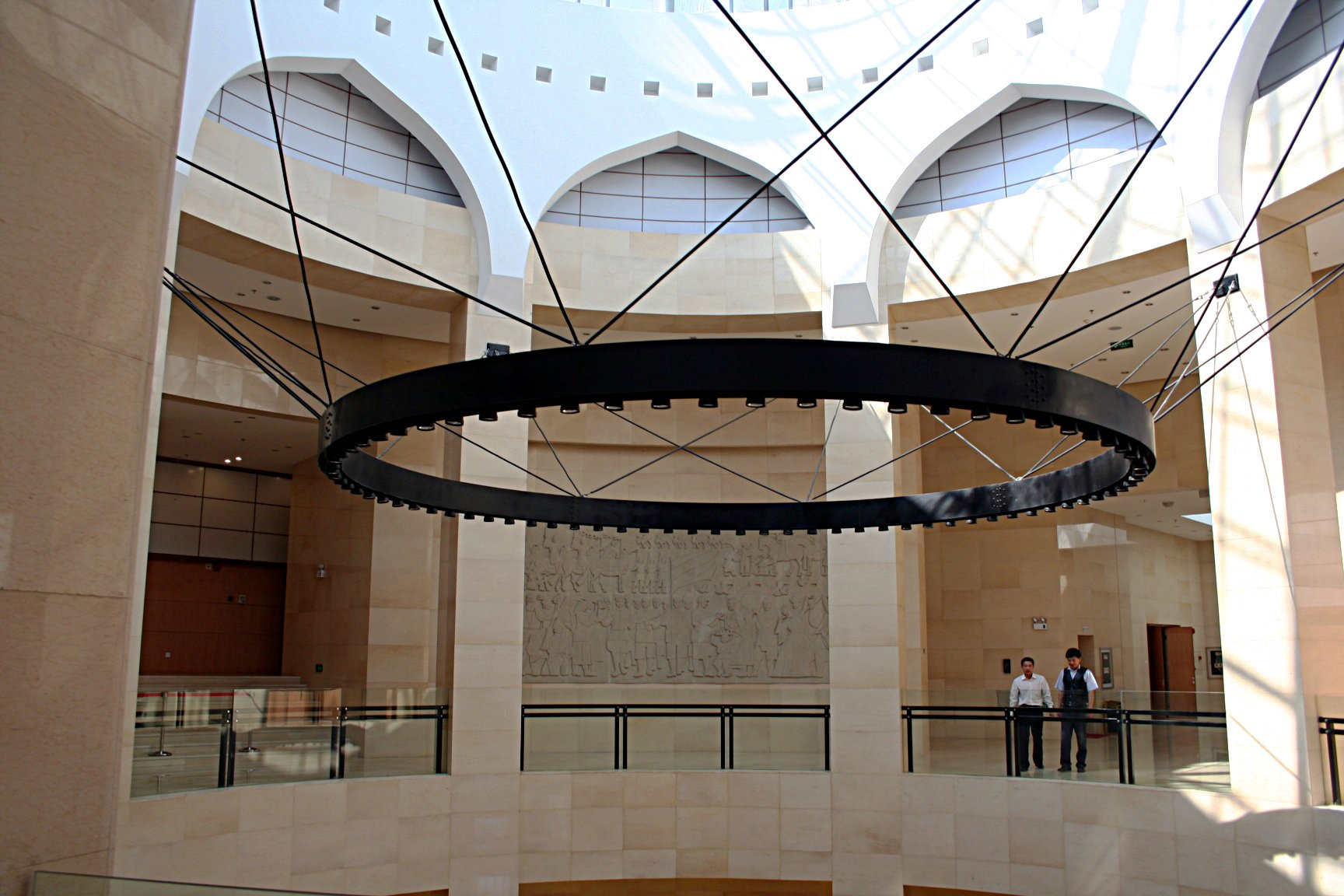
Inside the museum

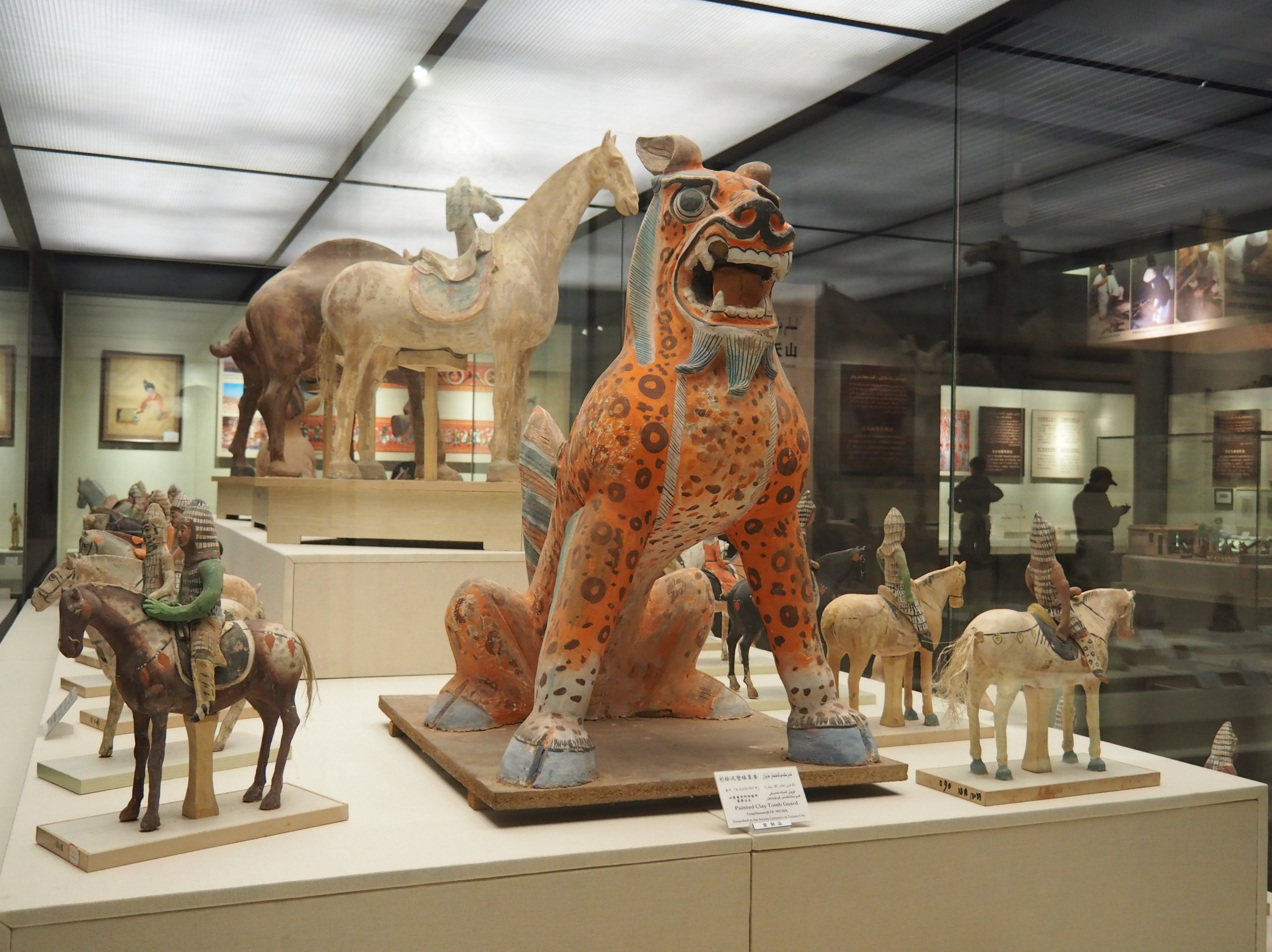
An exhibit at the Xinjiang Region Museum

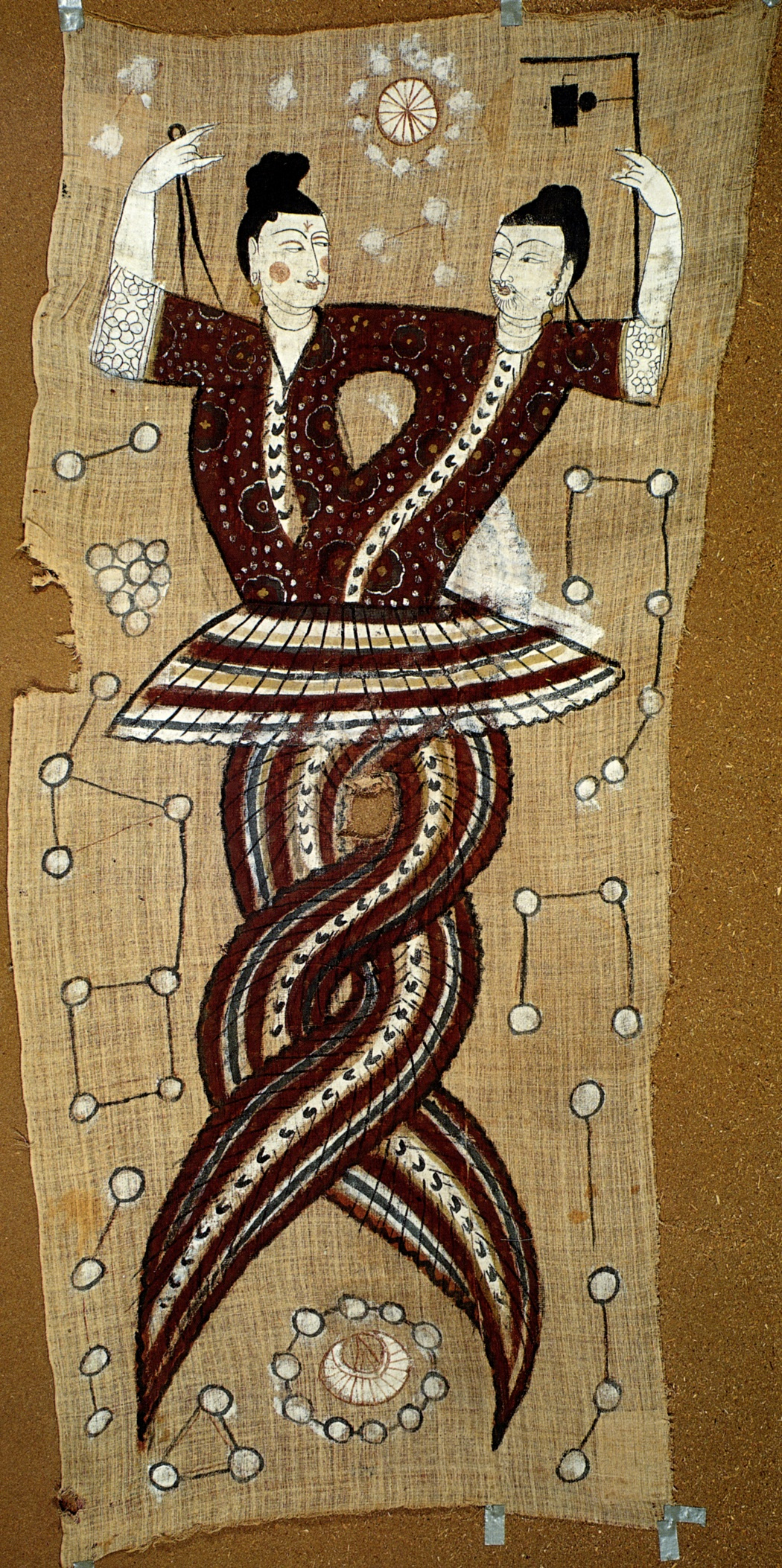
Fuxi and, his sister and wife, Nüwa

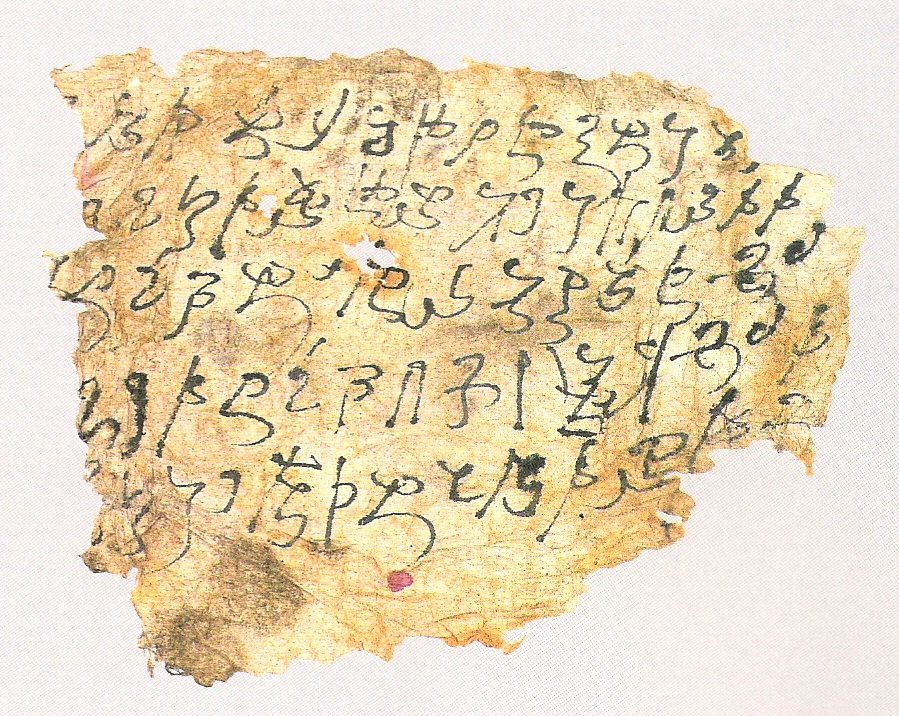
Kharosthi script

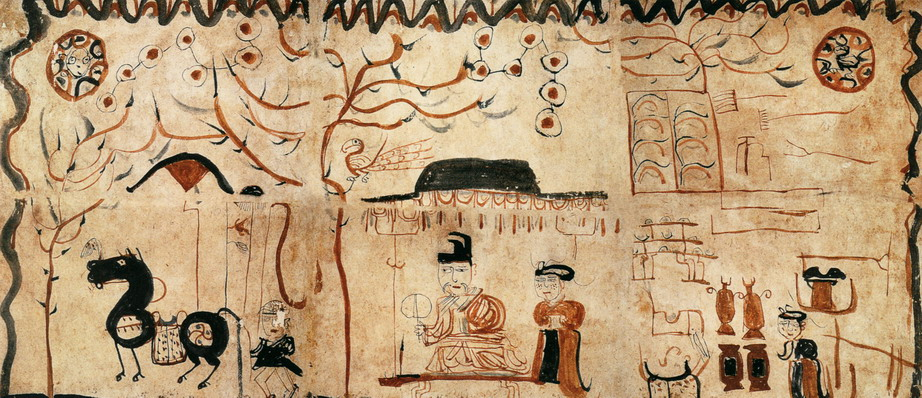
The life depicted on the tomb wall (Astana Cemetery)

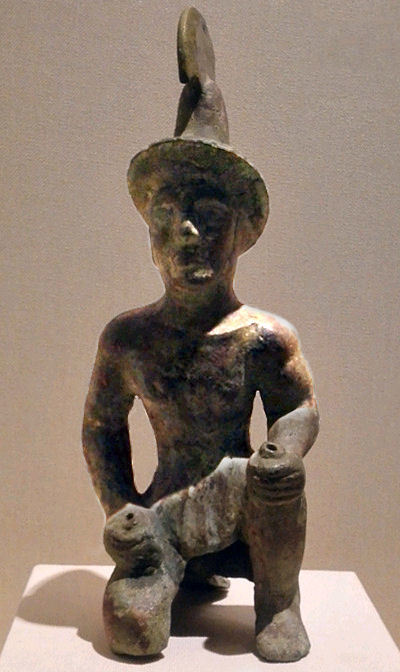
Statuette of a Greek soldier, from a 3rd-century BCE burial site north of the Tian Shan

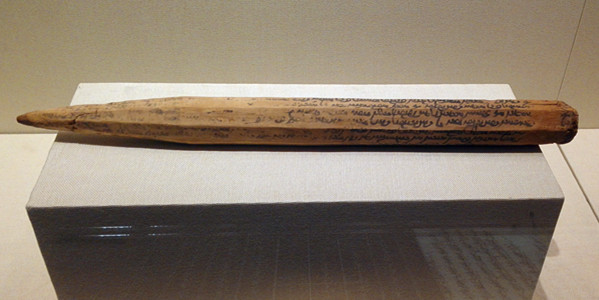
A wooden bar inscribed with Old Uyghur text

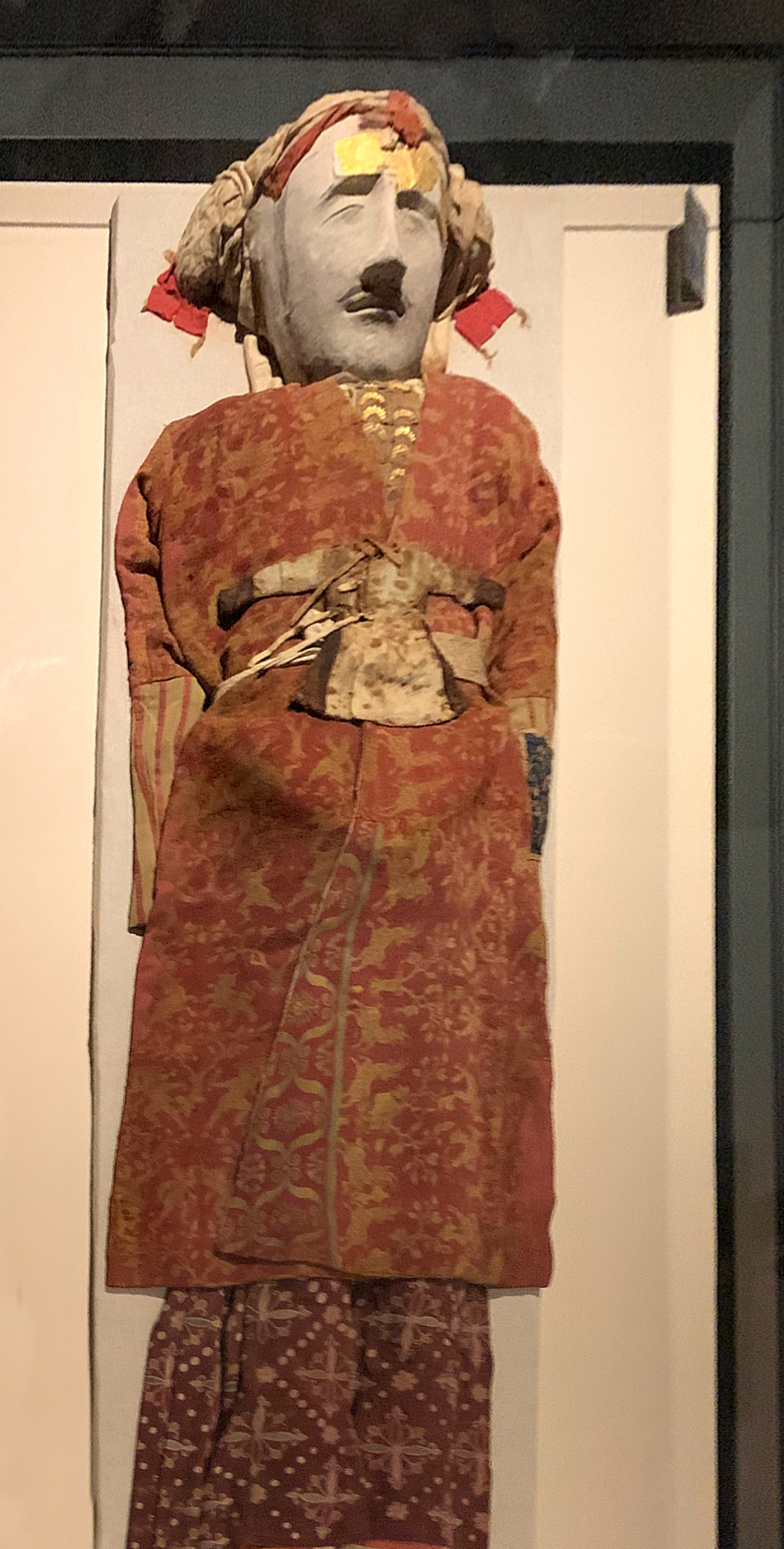
Yingpan man

== See also ==
- List of museums in China
- Turpan Museum
- Hotan Cultural Museum
