= Lanzhou–Xinjiang high-speed railway =

Railway line in western People's Republic of China

- A CRH5 high-speed train at the Menyuan railway station

Overview
- Other names: Lanzhou–Xinjiang Passenger Railway; Lanxin Second Railway
- Native name: 兰新铁路第二双线
- Status: Operational
- Owner: China Railway
- Locale: Northwest China
- Termini: Ürümqi; Lanzhou
- Stations: 31

Service
- Type: High-speed rail; Heavy rail
- System: China Railway High-speed
- Operators: China Railway Lanzhou Group; China Railway Qingzang Group; China Railway Ürümqi Group
- Rolling stock: CRH5G, CRH5E, CRH5G/H, CRHXD1D

History
- Commenced: November 4, 2009
- Opened: November 16, 2014
- Completed: December 26, 2014

Technical
- Line length: 1,776 km (1,104 mi)
- Number of tracks: 2
- Track gauge: 1,435 mm (4 ft 8 1/2 in) standard gauge
- Minimum radius: 7,000 m (22,966 ft)
- Electrification: 25 kV 50 Hz AC overhead line
- Operating speed: Service: 200–250 km/h (125–155 mph); Planned: 350 km/h (217 mph)
- Maximum incline: 2.0%

The Lanzhou–Xinjiang high-speed railway, also known as Lanzhou–Xinjiang Passenger Railway or Lanxin Second Railway (simplified Chinese: 兰新铁路第二双线; traditional Chinese: 蘭新鐵路第二雙線; pinyin: Lánxīn tiělù dìèr shuāngxiàn), is a high-speed railroad in Northwestern China from Lanzhou in Gansu Province to Ürümqi in the Xinjiang Uyghur Autonomous Region. It forms part of what China designates the Eurasia Continental Bridge corridor, a domestic high-speed railway corridor running from the city of Lianyungang in Jiangsu to the Kazakh border. The line is also shared with conventional trains.

Due to damage caused by geologically unstable terrain, traffic on parts of the line was suspended several times.

== History ==
Construction work began on November 4, 2009. The 1,776-kilometre (1,104 mi) railway took four years to complete, of which, 795 kilometres (494 mi) is in Gansu, 268 kilometres (167 mi) in Qinghai and 713 kilometres (443 mi) in Xinjiang. Track laying for the line was completed on November 16, 2013. Thirty-one stations will be built along the line. The project costs 143.5 billion yuan.

Unlike the older Lanxin railway, the line is routed via Xining, the capital of Qinghai and the start of the Qinghai–Tibet railway, before heading northwest across the Qilian Mountains into the Hexi Corridor at Zhangye. The rail tracks in the section near Qilianshan No. 2 Tunnel are at 3,607 metres (11,834 ft) above sea level, making it the highest high-speed rail track in the world.

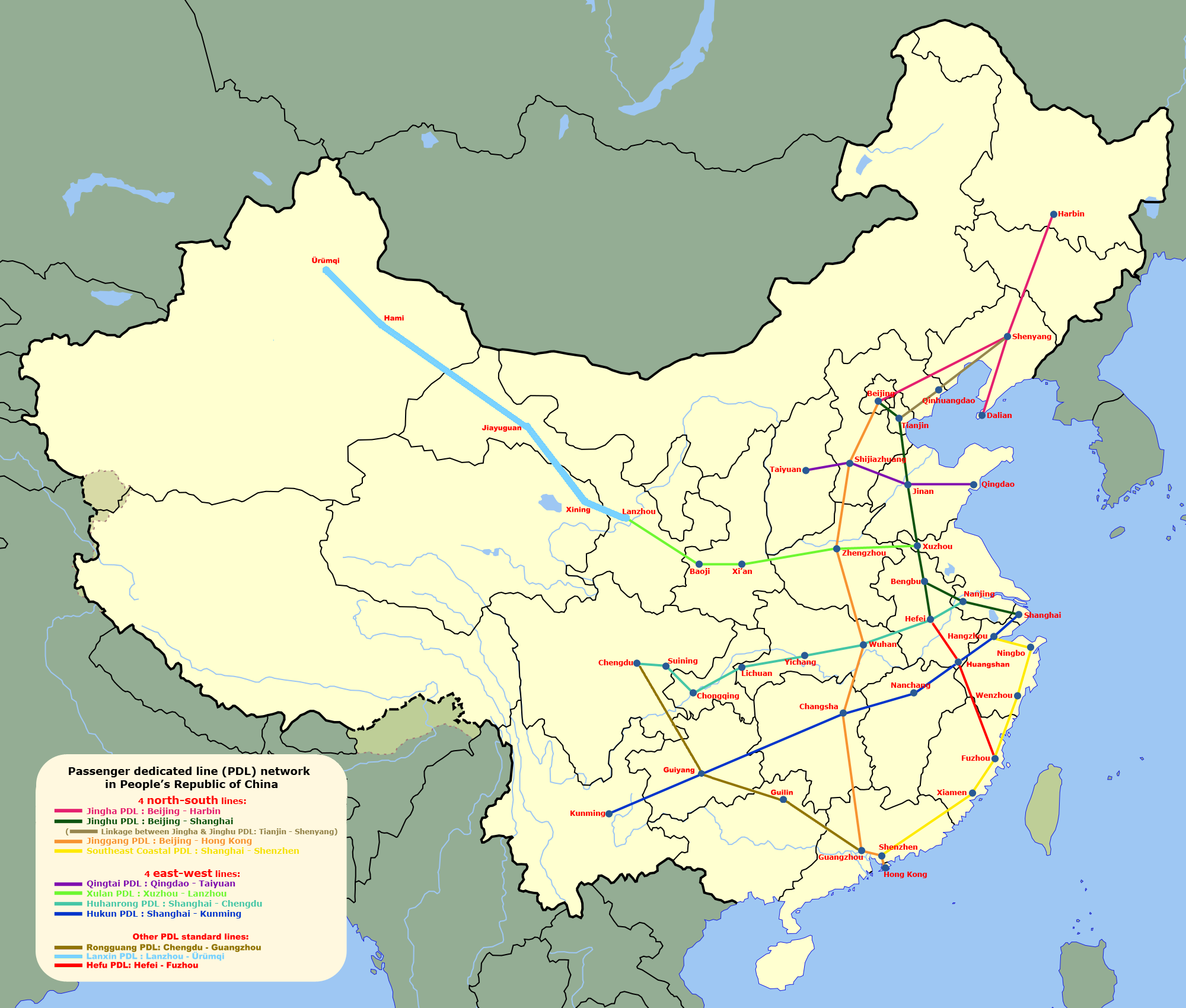
Lanzhou–Xinjiang high-speed railway is shown on the map as light-blue color line.

The first high-speed train traveled over this line on June 3, 2014. This was a test train with a media contingent with full revenue service not due to start until the end of 2014. The first segment of the line, the Ürümqi–Hami section, was inaugurated on November 16, 2014. This high-speed railway segment is the first ever railway of that kind to exist in the Xinjiang autonomous region. The rest of the line opened on December 26, 2014. The line cuts train travel time between the two cities from 20 hours to 12 hours. It also freed up capacity on the older Lanzhou–Xinjiang railway for freight transport.

On November 30, 2017, the Daheyan connection line between the Lanzhou–Xinjiang high-speed railway and the conventional Southern Xinjiang railway opened near Daheyan Town (near Turpan railway station). This will allow passenger trains traveling from Urumqi to destinations in Southern Xinjiang (such as Korla) to use the Ürümqi–Turpan section of the high-speed line before switching to the Southern Xinjiang Railway.

On December 5, 2021, Shandanmachang railway station opened along the railway. At an elevation of 3,108 m (10,197 ft), it is the world's highest high-speed rail station.

== Stations ==
City	Province	Station	Distance from Origin (km)
Lanzhou	Gansu	Lanzhou West railway station	0
Haidong	Qinghai	Haidong West railway station	163
Xining	Qinghai	Xining railway station	188
Menyuan	Qinghai	Menyuan railway station	286
Shandan	Gansu	Shandanmachang railway station	367
Minle	Gansu	Minle railway station	421
Zhangye	Gansu	Zhangye West railway station	485
Linze	Gansu	Linze South railway station	520
Gaotai	Gansu	Gaotai South railway station	556
Jiuquan	Gansu	Jiuquan South railway station	676
Jiayuguan	Gansu	Jiayuguan South railway station	697
Yumen	Gansu	Yumen railway station	823
Guazhou	Gansu	Liuyuan South railway station	986
Hami	Xinjiang	Hami railway station	1247
Shanshan	Xinjiang	Tuha railway station	1496
Shanshan	Xinjiang	Shanshan North railway station	1528
Turpan	Xinjiang	Turpan North railway station	1619
Ürümqi	Xinjiang	Ürümqi South railway station	1777
Ürümqi	Xinjiang	Ürümqi railway station	1786

== Operational issues ==
Due to geographically unstable terrain on the route, traffic on parts of the line was suspended six times after tunnels sustained damage. Unlike the conventional-speed Lanzhou–Xinjiang railway the line is routed via Xining, the capital of Qinghai, a major city and the start of the Qinghai–Tibet railway.

The under-construction Lanzhou–Zhangye high-speed railway will provide an alternative high-speed rail route between Lanzhou and Ürümqi, avoiding the most vulnerable sections, instead taking the conventional Hexi Corridor route.

=== Wind shed risk ===
Near Shanshan, the railway passes through the hundred-li wind zone, where desert wind constantly blows most days of a year. In 2007, strong wind overturned a train on the southern branch of the older conventional rail Lanxin Railway, and four people were killed. A 67 kilometres (42 mi) long wind-protection gallery has been built next to the tracks in this region.

=== Engineering issues ===
Many sections of the line have experienced roadbed settlement, deformation, subsidence, frost heave, and cracking of the concrete of the track bed caused by saline soil, large temperature differences, and extremely low temperatures.

The 3,769-metre (12,365 ft)-long Zhangjiazhuang Tunnel, located between Minhe South and Ledu South stations, was damaged several times during operation. The tunnel is embedded in mudstone, interbedded with sandstone and gypsum rock. The top covering soil layer is loess. In 2016, the tunnel was damaged twice, closing the line for 3 months. After reopening, the operation speed in the tunnel was limited to 60 kilometres per hour (37 mph). On December 24, 2018, the mountain above the tunnel deformed, but trains could initially continue operating. However, the next day, after further deformation, the tunnel was closed for thorough inspection. Due to repair works, the line was closed between Lanzhou and Xining until October 11, 2020. Trains were routed over the lower speed Lanzhou–Qinghai railway.

=== Earthquake damage ===
As a result of the January 2022 Menyuan earthquake, some bridges and tunnels on the line sustained serious damage. The section between Haomen and Qingshui North was halted until repairs could be completed.

=== Landslide ===
In September 2022, traffic on the line was suspended just north of Xining after a landslide caused the deck of a viaduct to shift.

== Economics ==
An analysis of China's railway network published in 2021 showed that the Lanzhou–Xinjiang high-speed railway has the lowest utilization rate among all high-speed railways in the country, carrying, on average, merely 2.3 million passenger kilometers of service per kilometer of the mainline. In comparison, the average load over China's high-speed rail network is 17 million passenger-km per km, and the nation's highest-volume line, the Beijing–Shanghai one, carries 48 million passenger-km per km. According to the same analysis, a high-speed line would need to carry ca. 36 million passenger-km per km to fully pay its own operating costs. While the Lanzhou-Xinjiang line has the capacity to carry over 160 pairs of high-speed trains per day, it currently only carries 4.

The above mentioned operational issues have also lead to reduced speeds, preventing the planned 16-hour travel time between Ürümqi and Beijing to be realized, and making air travel a more attractive option for those travelling between Ürümqi and Central China and beyond. Meanwhile the existing Lanxin Railway was upgraded to an operational speed of 160 km/h, whereas most sections of the Lanxin high-speed railway are operated at a reduced speed of 200 km/h, such that the difference in travel time compared to the cheaper conventional trains is less than originally envisioned.

As a result of the Belt and Road Initiative, freight transport along the Eurasian Land Bridge corridor increased and the conventional speed Lanzhou–Xinjiang railway sometimes hits capacity limitations, which has led some freight traffic to be shifted to the underutilized high-speed line.
