= Yingpan man =

Mummy excavated in Yingpan, China

Coordinates: 40.976170°N 87.829557°E

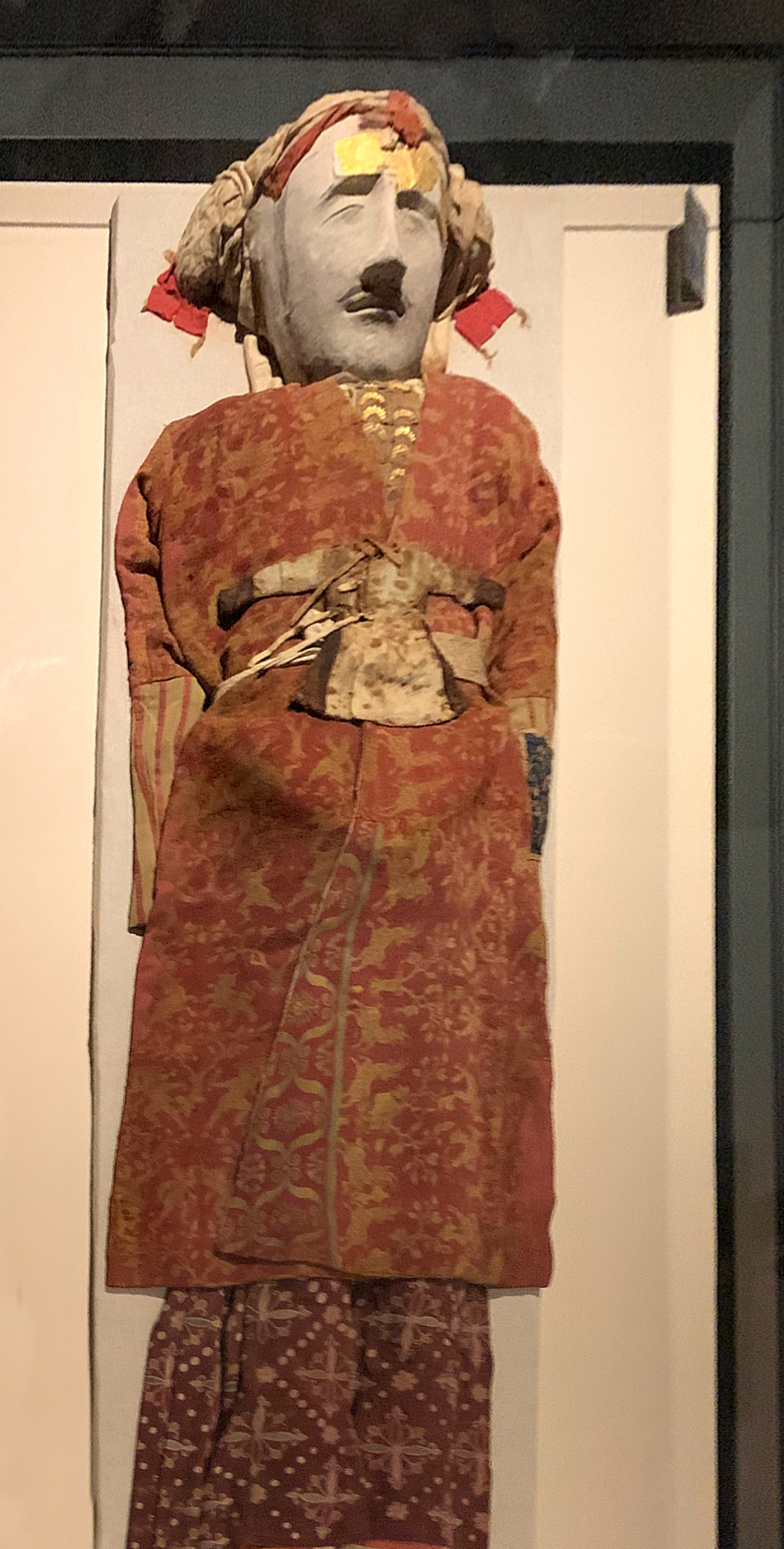
Yingpan man, Xinjiang Museum

The Yingpan man (Chinese: 营盘美男) is an ancient mummy which was excavated in the Yingpan cemetery located in the northeastern Tarim Basin. The mummy was 1.98 m (6 feet 6 inches) tall, and dates to the fourth or fifth centuries CE. The deceased was wearing luxurious clothes decorated with Hellenistic motifs.

The Yingpan man may have been a Sogdian or more probably an elite member of the Shanshan Kingdom nearby.

== Discovery ==
The individual who became known as Yingpan Man was discovered in 1995 by archaeologists from the Xinjiang Institute of Archaeology. His tomb, designated M15, lay on the eastern terrace of the Yingpan cemetery in the Lop Nur region of Xinjiang, northwestern China. The cemetery is near the northeastern edge of the Tarim Basin.

His body lay inside a painted wooden coffin in a burial pit. A raised platform had been built above the coffin, a common form of tomb at the Yingpan cemetery. Tomb M15 stood out for the exceptional preservation and richness of its contents.

== Condition ==
When excavated, Yingpan Man's body was exceptionally well preserved. The extremely dry conditions of the Tarim Basin had naturally dried the body, preserving his brown hair and soft tissues as well as his clothing and other organic materials. The body later became seriously decomposed. It was removed from the clothing so that the garments could be conserved and studied, and the remains were stored separately in Ürümqi, the capital of Xinjiang.

== Scientific analysis ==
Yingpan Man lived during the fourth or fifth century CE, approximately 1,500–1,700 years ago. Standing approximately 1.98 m (6 ft 6 in) tall, he was unusually tall for his time and remains one of the most striking individuals discovered among the Tarim mummies.

== Identity ==
The identity of Yingpan Man has been debated since his discovery. The richness of his burial and the exceptional quality of his clothing indicate that he belonged to the social elite. Some scholars have suggested that he may have been a member of the Sogdians, an Iranian people who played a major role in trade and cultural exchange along the Silk Road. Others have argued that he was more likely a wealthy member of the Shanshan Kingdom, an oasis state centred on the southern rim of the Tarim Basin that controlled important routes across the Silk Road during late antiquity.

Scientific studies have provided additional evidence about his background. Analysis of chemical signatures preserved in his remains suggests that he spent most of his childhood and adult life in the Tarim Basin rather than arriving from a distant region shortly before his death.

Although his precise origins and cultural identity remain uncertain, Yingpan Man is widely regarded as an example of the cultural diversity and international connections that characterized the Silk Road during the fourth and fifth centuries CE.

== Exhibition ==
The mummy is located in the Xinjiang Museum.

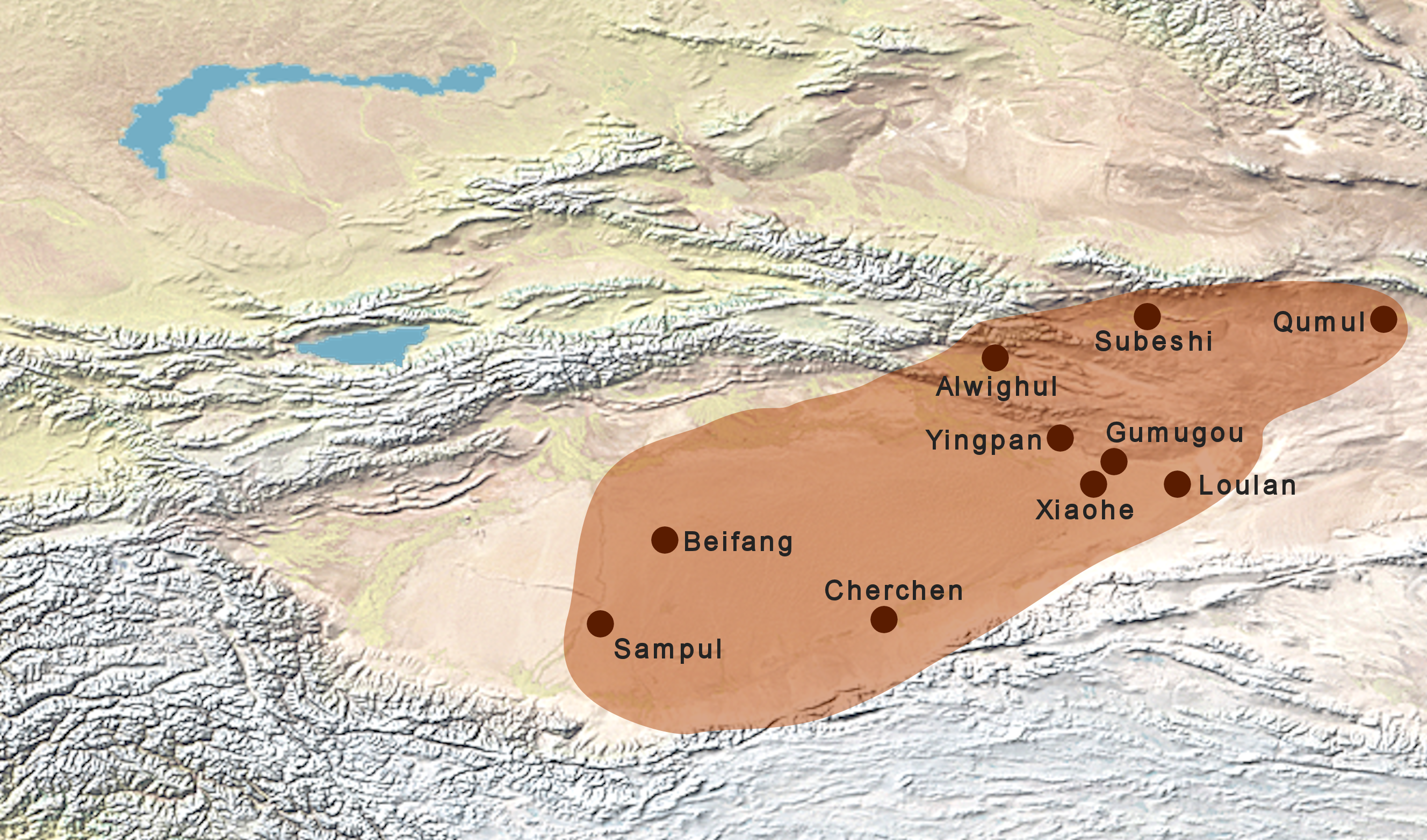
General area of the Tarim mummies ( ) with main burial sites, including Yingpan.

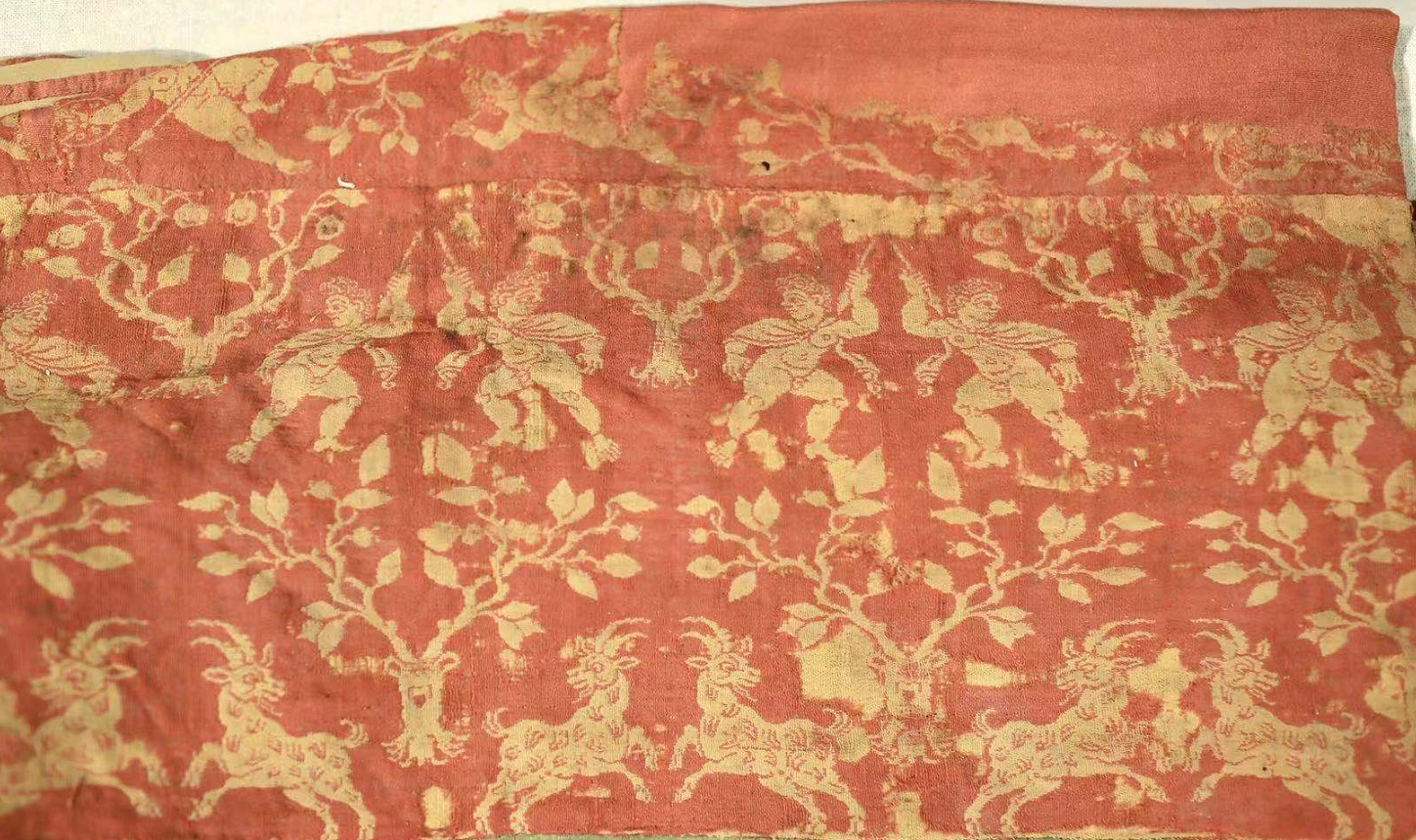
Hellenistic motifs on the dress of the Yingpan man

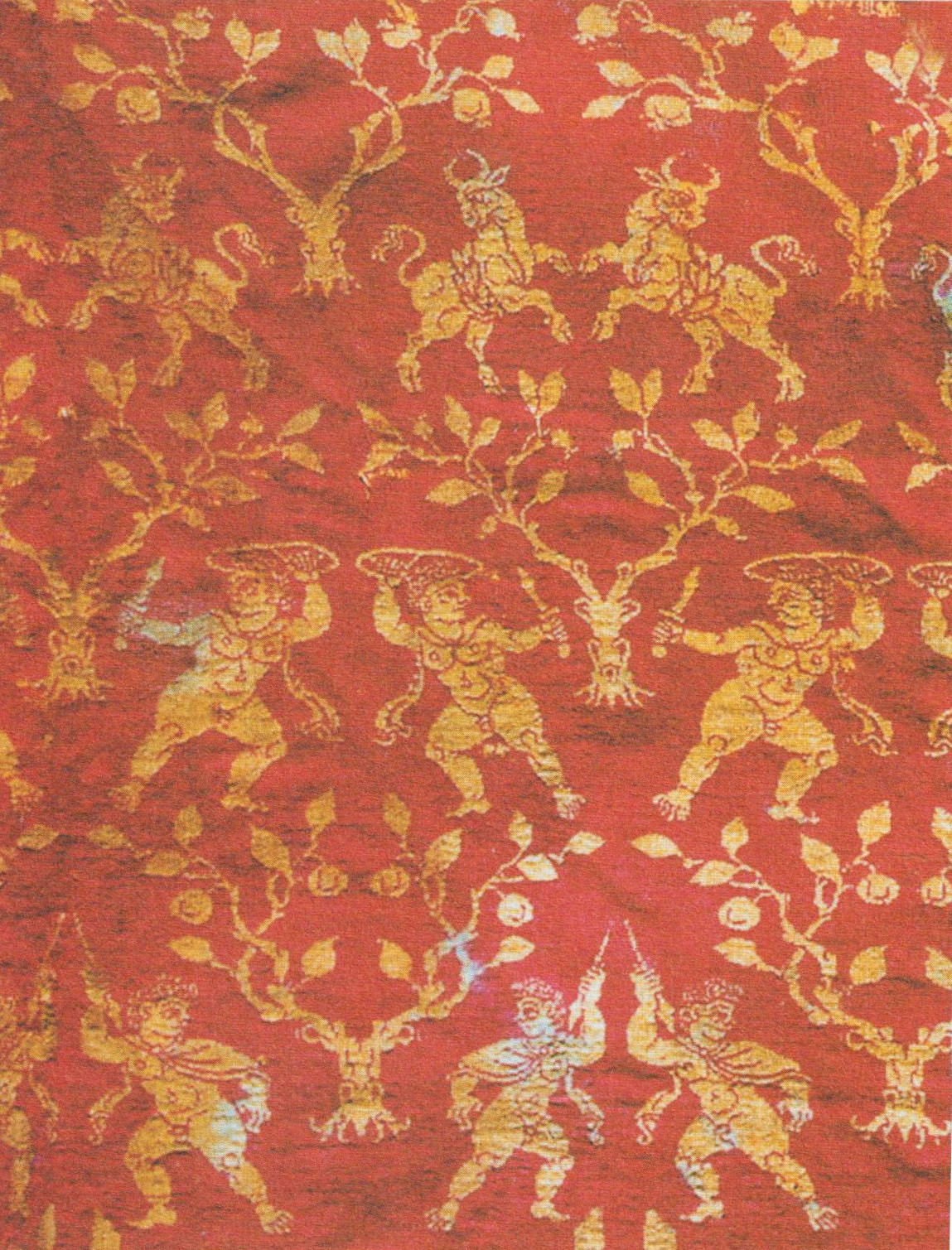
Hellenistic motifs on the dress of the Yingpan man
