= Shandanmachang railway station =

Railway station in Zhangye, Gansu, China

Shandanmachang 山丹马场站

General information
- Coordinates: 38.094°N 101.206°E
- Elevation: 3,108 m (10,197 ft)
- Operator: China Railway Lanzhou Group
- Platforms: 2
- Tracks: 4

Other information
- Station code: JEJ

History
- Opened: 5 December 2021
Location

Shandanmachang railway station is a station on the Lanzhou–Xinjiang high-speed railway in Shandan County, Zhangye, Gansu province.

== History ==
Opened on 5 December 2021, it is the world's highest high-speed rail station, being located at an elevation of 3,108 m (10,197 ft).

Prior to opening as a passenger station, an overtaking station was already present at its location.

The station serves Shandan Horse Farm, a local tourist destination.
