= Lanzhou–Zhangye high-speed railway =

Railway line in Gansu, China

Overview
- Native name: 兰张高速铁路
- Status: Operational between Lanzhou and Wuwei
- Owner: China Railway
- Termini: Chenguanying railway station; Zhangye West railway station
- Continues from: Lanzhou–Zhongchuan Airport intercity railway

Service
- Operator(s): China Railway Lanzhou Group

History
- Opened: 2024 (Lanzhou-Wuwei)

Technical
- Operating speed: 250 km/h (160 mph)

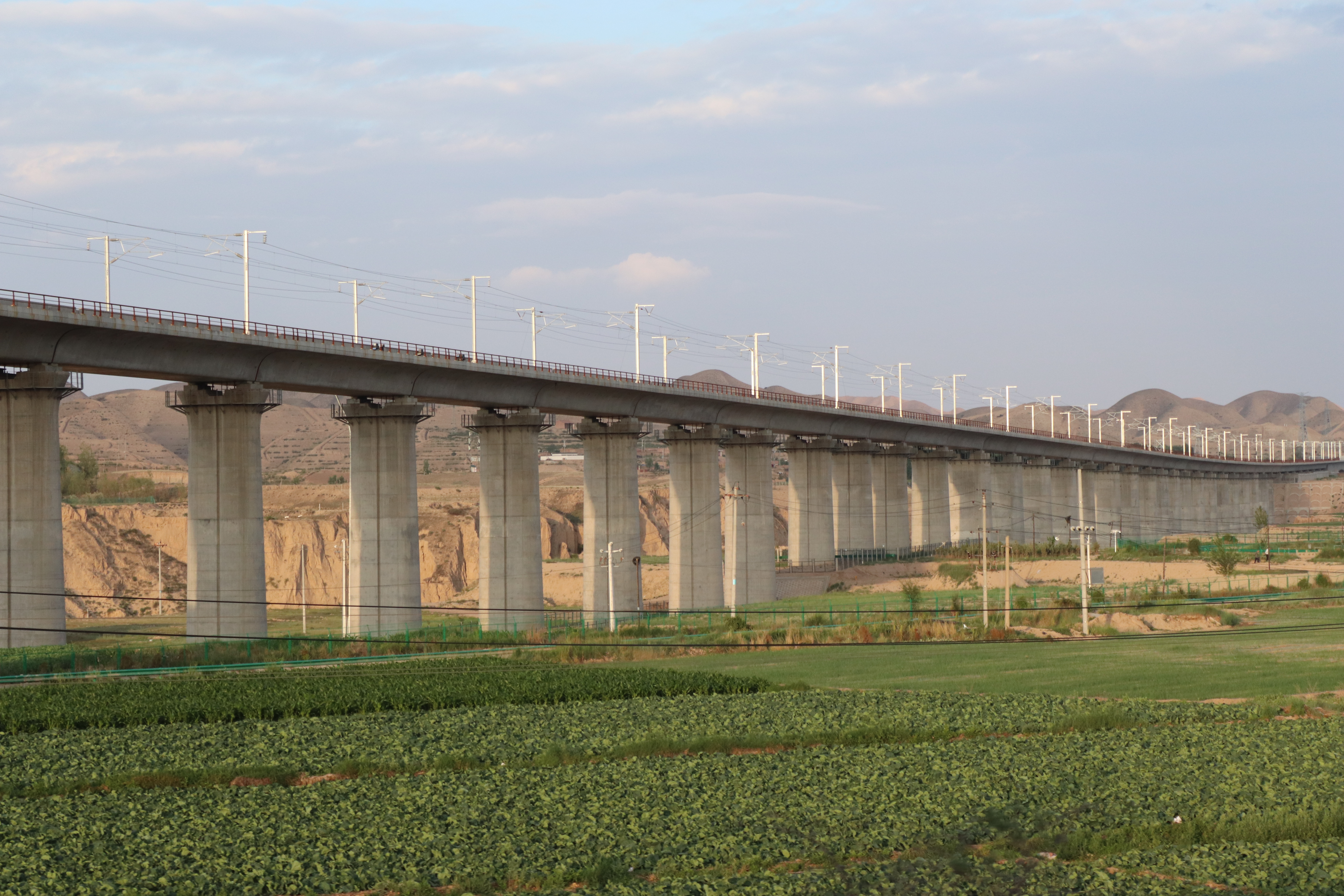
The Lanzhou–Zhangye rail line

The Lanzhou–Zhangye high-speed railway is a high-speed rail line from Lanzhou to Zhangye, both in China's Gansu Province. The line runs along the Hexi Corridor and roughly parallels the Lanzhou–Xinjiang railway. Once fully completed it will form an alternative route to the Lanzhou–Xinjiang high-speed railway. The line is part of the Belt and Road and New Silk Road transportation corridor.

The line is constructed by China Railway Construction Corporation and designed for operations up to 250 km/h (160 mph).

== History ==
Test runs on the 194.3 km (120.7 mi) long Lanzhou to Wuwei section started in March 2024 and the line opened for passenger traffic on 15 June 2024.

The new stations are Yongdeng North, Tianzhu West, Heisongyi (overtaking station), Gulang North, and Wuwei East.

On 11 December 2024, construction on the Wuwei to Zhangye section started, with a planned construction time of three years. New stations will include Jinchang South, Jiling West and Shandan North.

== See also ==
- Wushaoling Tunnel
