= April 2014 Ürümqi attack =

Bomb-and-knife attack in Xinjiang, China

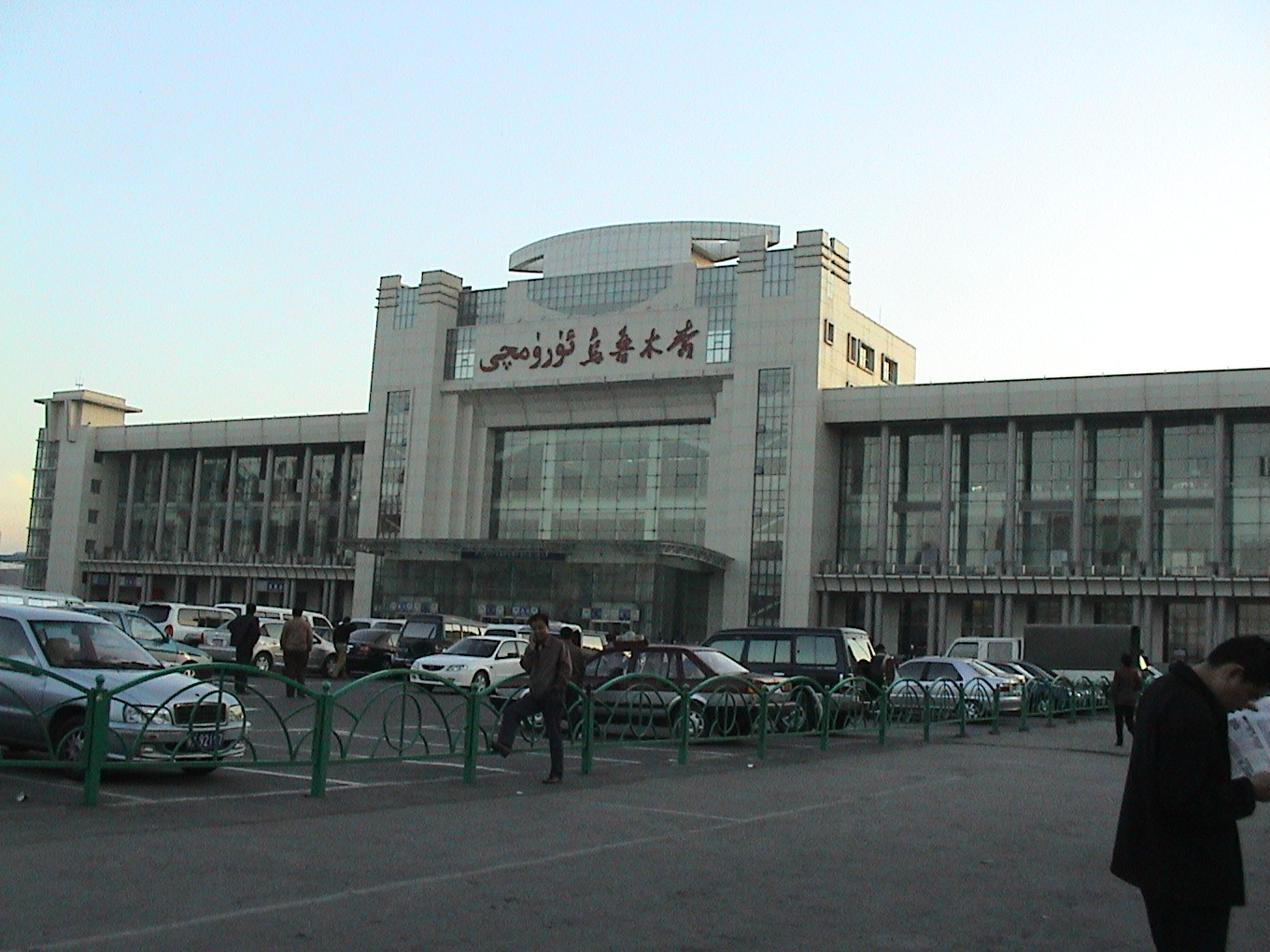
- A view of Ürümqi South Railway Station
- Location: 43°46′43″N 87°35′04″E; Ürümqi, Xinjiang, China
- Date: 30 April 2014; 7:10 pm (China Standard Time)
- Target: Ürümqi Railway Station
- Attack type: Suicide bombing; knife attack
- Deaths: 3 (including both perpetrators)
- Injuries: 79
- Perpetrator: Turkistan Islamic Party
- Motive: Islamic extremism

On 30 April 2014, a bomb-and-knife attack occurred in the Chinese city of Ürümqi, Xinjiang. The terrorist attack killed 3 people, and injured 79 others. The attack coincided with the conclusion of a visit by Xi Jinping, General Secretary of the Chinese Communist Party to the region.

At approximately 7:10 pm local time, a pair of assailants attacked passengers with knives and detonated explosives at the city's railway station. Police closed off all entrances to the station in the immediate aftermath of the attack, but it was reopened at 9 pm with increased security. The number of perpetrators involved in the attack is unknown, but 2 individuals are suspected. The Turkistan Islamic Party claimed responsibility.

== Background ==
The attack occurred on the final day of Xi Jinping's 4-day tour of the region. A day prior, he labelled Xinjiang the "front line against terrorism" during a visit to the nearby city of Kashgar, and vowed to take a hardline against terrorism and violence attributed to Muslim Uyghur separatists, which killed at least 100 people over the past year. It is not known if Xi was still in the province when the attack took place. On the morning of the attack, he visited a mosque – located 2 kilometres (1.2 mi) away from the railway station – and urged religious leaders to foster harmony among the people in Xinjiang by giving followers a better understanding of religious teachings.

== Attack ==
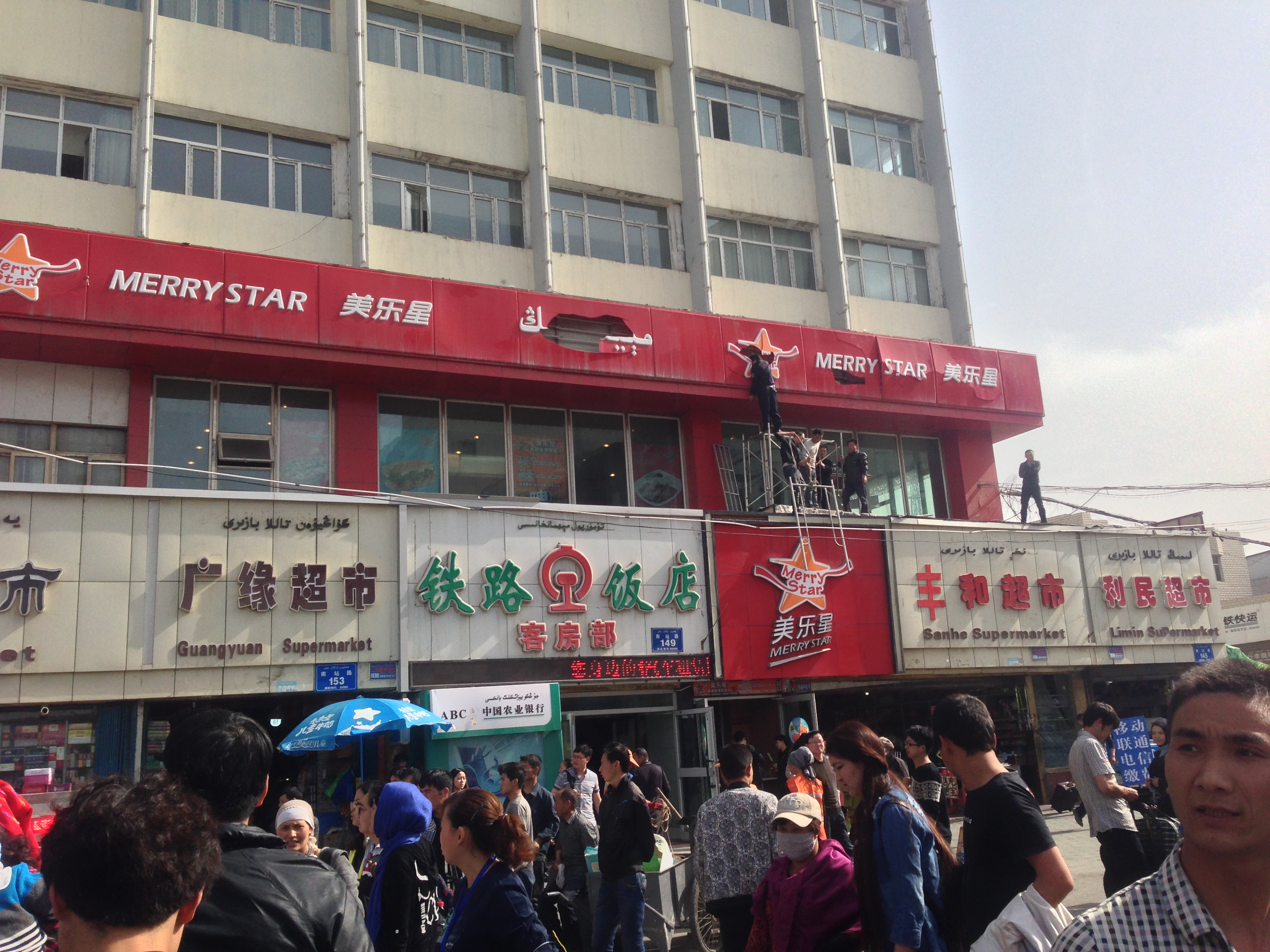
The blast damaged the billboard located southwest of the South Railway Station.

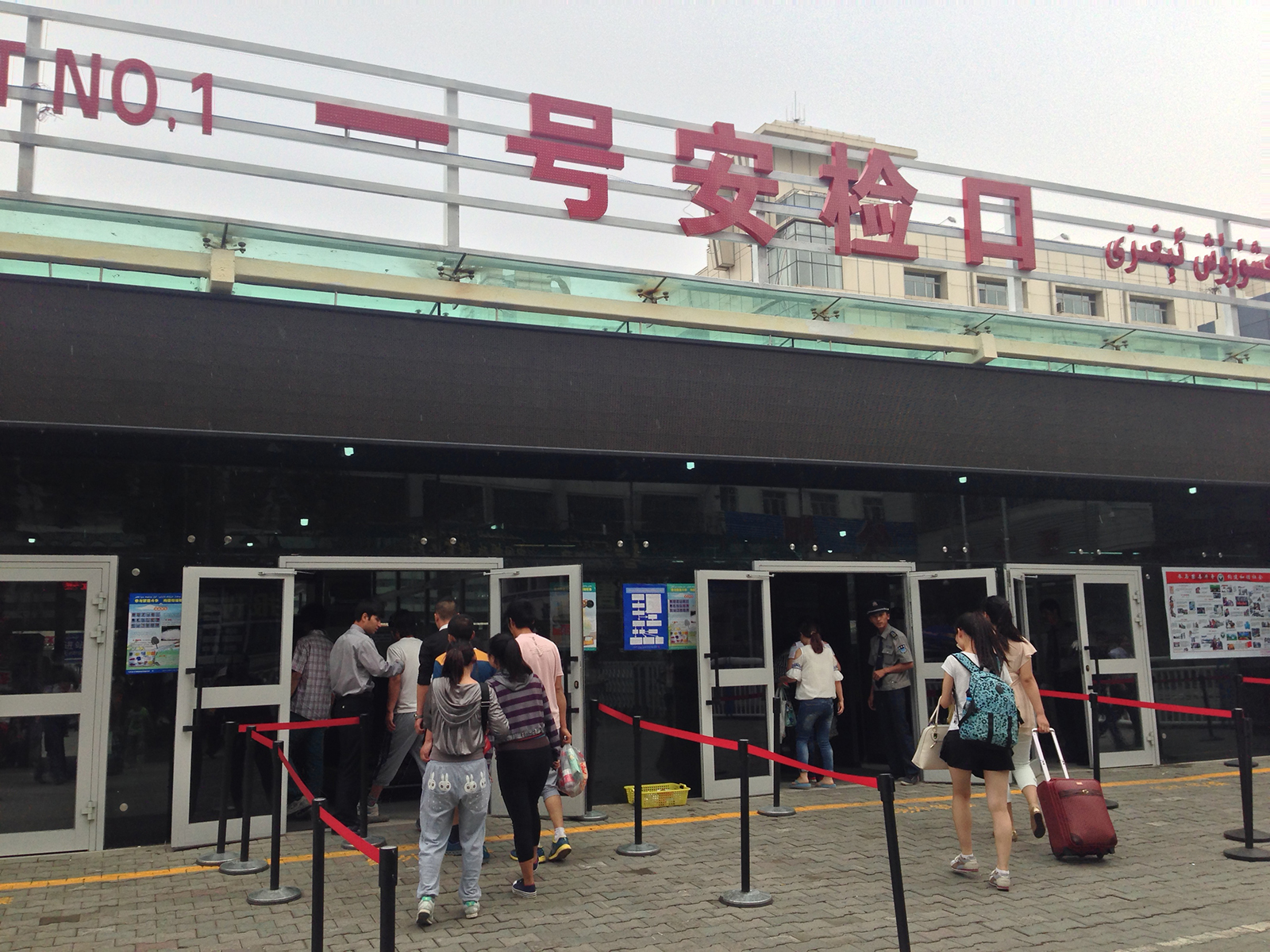
After the South Railway Station blast, security checkpoints were constructed on the square in front of the South Railway Station after 26 May. This image shows the No.1 security checkpoint at South Railway Station.

At 7:10 pm local time on 30 April 2014, a group of individuals used knives to attack passengers and detonated bombs at the exit of Ürümqi South Station. Originally, it was thought that the explosives came from luggage situated between the station and the bus stop outside, but the People's Daily reported that it was a suicide bombing, stating that the attackers had "set off bombs tied on their bodies and died." Accounts about the intensity of the blast were also somewhat contradictory. While a worker at a nearby hostel had reportedly mistaken the explosion for an earthquake, another eyewitness noted how the bomb appeared to be "home made, as the blast was not massive." Initially, the attack was said to have injured fifty people, but state news media revised the figures the next morning to three killed and seventy-nine injured.

It was reported that the attack was carried out by two religiously motivated suicide bombers. One of them was identified as Sedierding Shawuti, a 39-year-old Uyghur from Xayar County, Aksu in Southern Xinjiang. According to an anti-terrorist intelligence service, a group named Turkestan Islamic Party has claimed responsibility for the attack.

== Initial response ==
After the attack, "security forces moved quickly" to the station, and later paramilitary and riot police were stationed on its various entrances. Casualties were taken to the hospital in ambulances, but taxis were also commandeered to compensate for a lack of ambulance availability and to ensure the swift treatment of injuries. According to Xinhua News Agency, the area around the station was evacuated by security forces. The bombing meant that the rail services ceased for about two hours, and after the attack nearby shops repaired minor damage and tightened security.

There was an overnight cordon around the train station, which was lifted at 9:00 pm, amid heavier police security.

Many internet posts regarding the attack were rapidly censored by the Chinese government. Sina Weibo, the country's largest microblogging site, took down comments and photos pertaining to the explosion, which had come through within an hour on their "Breaking News" account. It did not make any further updates for two hours.

== Reactions ==
Communist Party general secretary Xi Jinping responded to the incident by promising "decisive actions [against] terrorist attacks" and stated that a "strike-first" strategy would be implemented. He also called on government officials in the region to do everything they could to ensure that the injured were assisted, the crime investigated and the perpetrators punished severely.

Search engine Baidu prevented certain results from appearing when searching for terms related to the attack – citing "relevant legal rules and policies" – while Chinese news media simply duplicated the report by Xinhua News Agency, which is required of them when reporting on sensitive topics.
