= Saybag, Ürümqi =

Saybag: 沙依巴克区 (Chinese); سايباغ رايونى (Uyghur)
- District
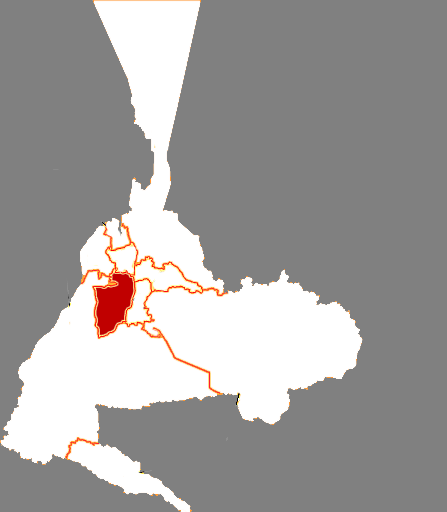
- Saybag in Ürümqi

- Location of the seat in Xinjiang Saybag (Xinjiang) Saybag (China)
- Coordinates: 43°48′N 87°35′E
- Country: China
- Autonomous region: Xinjiang
- Prefecture-level city: Ürümqi
- District seat: Yangzijiang Road Subdistrict

Area
  - Total: 399.5 km^{2} (154.2 sq mi)

Population (2020)
  - Total: 799,539
  - Density: 2,001/km^{2} (5,183/sq mi)
- Time zone: UTC+8 (China Standard (Note: Locals in Xinjiang frequently observe UTC+6 (Xinjiang Time), 2 hours behind Beijing.))
- Website: www.sayibak.gov.cn

Saybag, Ürümqi

Chinese name
- Simplified Chinese: 沙依巴克区
- Traditional Chinese: 沙依巴克區
Transcriptions
Standard Mandarin
- Hanyu Pinyin: Shāyībākè Qū

Uyghur name
- Uyghur: سايباغ رايونى
Transcriptions
- Latin Yëziqi: Saybagh Rayoni
- Yengi Yeziⱪ: Saybaƣ Rayoni
- Siril Yëziqi: Сайбағ Райони

Saybag District (Uyghur: سايباغ رايونى, romanized: Saybagh Rayoni, Saybaƣ Rayoni, Saybag Rayoni, Сайбағ Райони; Chinese: 沙依巴克区; pinyin: Shāyībākè Qū) is one of 7 urban districts of the prefecture-level city of Ürümqi, the capital of Xinjiang Uygur Autonomous Region, Northwest China. It contains an area of 422 km^{2} (163 sq mi). According to the 2002 census, it has a population of 440,000.

== Administrative divisions ==
Saybag District contains 17 subdistricts:

Name	Simplified Chinese	Hanyu Pinyin	Uyghur (UEY)	Uyghur Latin (ULY)	Administrative division code
Subdistricts
Changjiang Road Subdistrict	长江路街道	Chángjiānglù Jiēdào	چاڭجياڭ يولى كوچا باشقارمىسى	Changjyang yoli kocha bashqarmisi	650103001
Hetian Street Subdistrict	和田街街道	Hétiánjiē Jiēdào	خوتەن كوچىسى كوچا باشقارمىسى	Xoten kochisi kocha bashqarmisi	650103002
Yangzijiang Road Subdistrict	扬子江路街道	Yángzǐjiānglù Jiēdào	ياڭزىجياڭ يولى كوچا باشقارمىسى	Yangzijyang yoli kocha bashqarmisi	650103003
Youhao South Road Subdistrict	友好南路街道	Yǒuhǎonánlù Jiēdào	جەنۇبىي دوستلۇق يولى كوچا باشقارمىسى	Jenubiy dostluq yoli kocha bashqarmisi	650103004
Youhao North Road Subdistrict	友好北路街道	Yǒuhǎoběilù Jiēdào	شىمالىي دوستلۇق يولى كوچا باشقارمىسى	Shimaliy dostluq yoli kocha bashqarmisi	650103005
Bayi Subdistrict (August the 1st Road)	八一街道	Bāyī Jiēdào	«1-ئاۋغۇست» كوچا باشقارمىسى	«1-Awghust» kocha bashqarmisi	650103006
Luyuan Street Subdistrict	炉院街街道	Lúyuànjiē Jiēdào	لۇيۈەن كوچىسى كوچا باشقارمىسى	Luyüen kochisi kocha bashqarmisi	650103007
Xishan Subdistrict	西山街道	Xīshān Jiēdào	شىشەن كوچا باشقارمىسى	Shishen kocha bashqarmisi	650103008
Yamalikh Mountain Subdistrict (Yamalikeshan Subdistrict)	雅玛里克山街道	Yǎmǎlǐkèshān Jiēdào	يامالىق تېغى كوچا باشقارمىسى	Yamaliq têghi kocha bashqarmisi	650103009
Hongmiaozi Subdistrict (Khizil But Subdistrict)	红庙子街道	Hóngmiàozǐ Jiēdào	قىزىل بۇت كوچا باشقارمىسى	Qizil but kocha bashqarmisi	650103010
Changsheng East Subdistrict	长胜东街道	Chángshèngdōng Jiēdào	چاڭشېڭ شەرقىي كوچا باشقارمىسى	Changshëng sherqiy kocha bashqarmisi	650103011
Changsheng West Subdistrict	长胜西街道	Chángshèngxī Jiēdào	چاڭشېڭ غەربىي كوچا باشقارمىسى	Changshêng gherbiy kocha bashqarmisi	650103012
Changsheng South Subdistrict	长胜南街道	Chángshèngnán Jiēdào	چاڭشېڭ جەنۇبىي كوچا باشقارمىسى	Changshêng jenubiy kocha bashqarmisi	650103013
South Railway Station Subdistrict	火车南站街道	Huǒchēnánzhàn Jiēdào	جەنۇبىي ۋوگزال كوچا باشقارمىسى	Jenubiy wogzal kocha bashqarmisi	650103014
Huangwei Road Subdistrict	环卫路街道	Huánwèilù Jiēdào	خۇەنۋېي يولى كوچا باشقارمىسى	Xuenwëy yoli kocha bashqarmisi	650103016
Qimashan Subdistrict (Mingeshtagh Subdistrict)	骑马山街道	Qímǎshān Jiēdào	مىنگەشتاغ كوچا باشقارمىسى	Mingeshtagh kocha bashqarmisi	650103017
Pingdingshan Subdistrict (Yekhilghantagh Subdistrict)	平顶山街道	Píngdǐngshān Jiēdào	يېقىلغان تاش كوچا باشقارمىسى	Yëqilghan tash kocha bashqarmisi	650103018

== Transport ==
- Ürümqi railway station
- Ürümqi South railway station
