= Ürümqi railway station =

Railway station in Xinjiang, China

Ürümqi 乌鲁木齐 ئۈرۈمچی
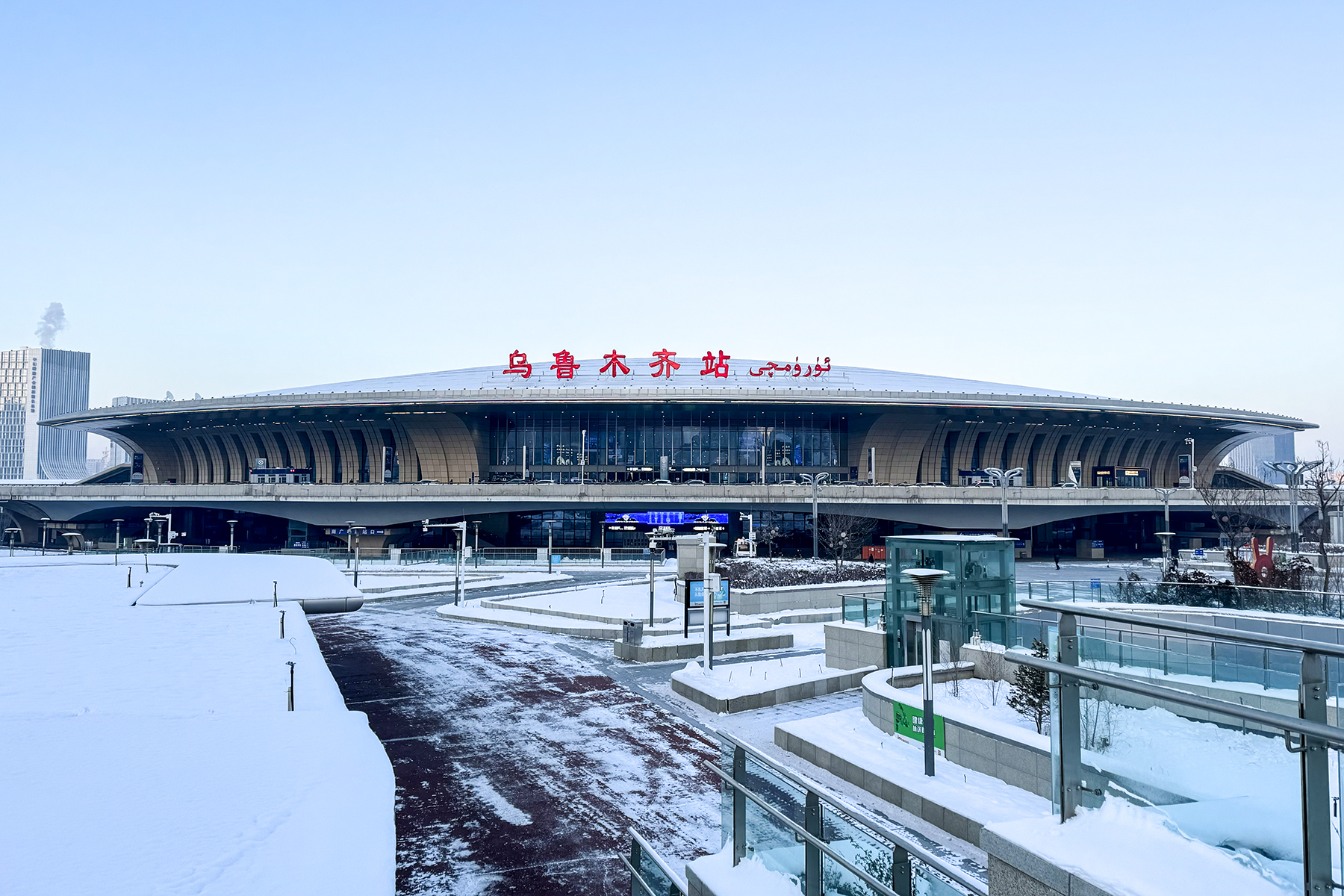

General information
- Location: Saybag District, Ürümqi, Xinjiang; China
- Coordinates: 43°50′36.8″N 87°31′26.5″E
- Operator: China Railway Ürümqi Group
- Lines: Lanzhou–Xinjiang high-speed railway; Northern Xinjiang railway; Ürümqi–Dzungaria railway
- Connections: 2

Other information
- Station code: 42801 (TMIS); WAR (telegram code); WLQ (pinyin code)

History
- Opened: July 1, 2016
- Former names: Ergong
Location

Ürümqi railway station (Chinese: 乌鲁木齐站; Uyghur: ئۈرۈمچی ۋوگزالى, romanized: Ürümchi békiti) is a railway station and a major transport hub for high-speed and conventional rail in Ürümqi, Xinjiang. The station was a small halt called Ergong before renovation.

It should not be confused with Ürümqi South railway station, which was known by the same name from 1962 until 2014, when the new train station was completed. The newer station, being much larger and grander than Ürümqi South, will assume the role of Ürümqi's primary railway station. However, trains will continue to service both, with some express services skipping through the older station.

Built primarily as the western terminus of the Lanzhou–Xinjiang high-speed railway, for the first time high speed trains now connect the far western province to Eastern Chinese cities, allowing for express trains to reach Beijing in around 18 hours; much less than the 31 hours it previously took. Conventional rail services continue to use the Lanxin railway eastwards and the Northern Xinjiang railway westwards across the rest of the province.

The station was opened and started trial operations on July 1, 2016 with high speed services to Hami.

== See also ==
- Ürümqi South railway station
- Alashankou railway station
- Kashgar railway station
- Southern Xinjiang Railway

Preceding station	China Railway	Following station
Ürümqi South Terminus	Northern Xinjiang railway	Ürümqi West towards Alashankou
