= Jiayuguan South railway station =

Railway station in Jiayuguan, China

Jiayuguannan 嘉峪关南
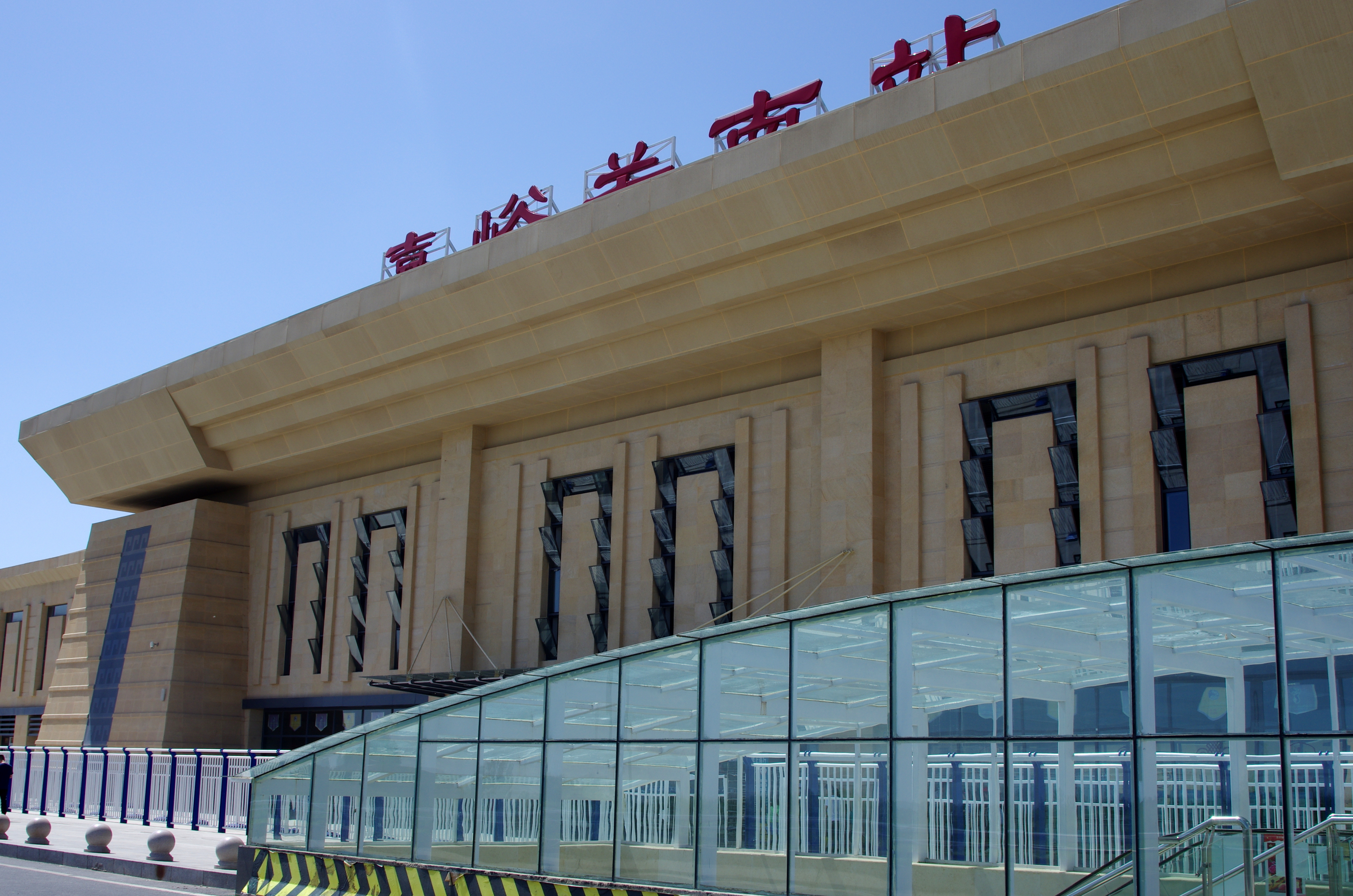
- View of the Passenger Waiting Hall

General information
- Other names: Jiayuguan Nan
- Location: Jiayuguan, Gansu; China
- Coordinates: 39°42′57.95″N 98°18′31.14″E
- Operated by: China Railway Lanzhou Group
- Line: Lanzhou–Xinjiang high-speed railway
- Platforms: 5 (1 side, 2 island)

History
- Opened: December 26, 2014
Location

Jiayuguan South railway station (Chinese: 嘉峪关南站; pinyin: Jiāyùguān Nán Zhàn) is a railway station located in Jiayuguan, Gansu Province, China. It was put into operation on December 26, 2014. It serves the Lanzhou–Xinjiang High-Speed Railway with High Speed services between Lanzhou and Urumqi and conventional services connecting Urumqi to various cities in Eastern and South Western China. It is the second major railway station serving Jiayuguan, with Jiayuguan railway station, which serves the conventional Lanzhou-Xinjiang Railway.

== Structure ==
The station follows a standard set for modern railway station in China for smaller cities. It was constructed on a green field site, south of Jiayuguan, in an area being newly developed. It is built across three levels, the upper platform level, the mid level passenger waiting hall (located north of the tracks) and the lower transportation hub. It consists of 7 tracks served by 5 platforms, two islands and one side platforms. Platform 1 serves all terminating high speed trains to and from Lanzhou. Platforms 2 & 3 serve eastbound through train services, two through passing tracks and then with platforms 4 & 5 serving westbound services.

== Gallery ==
Images of Jiayuguan South railway station
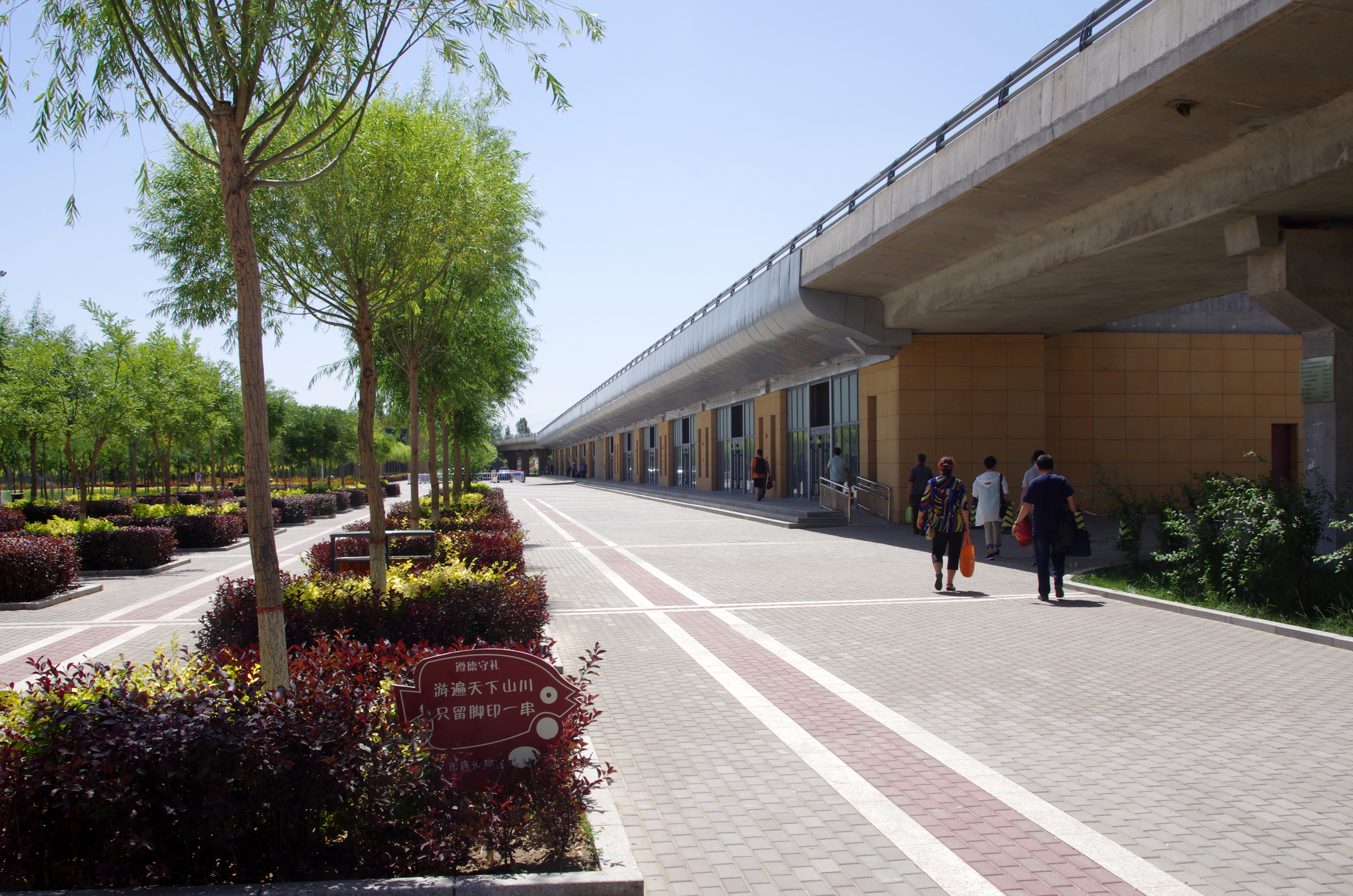
This is the lowest level of the station, featuring a taxi stand, an unused long-distance bus station and local public bus transport

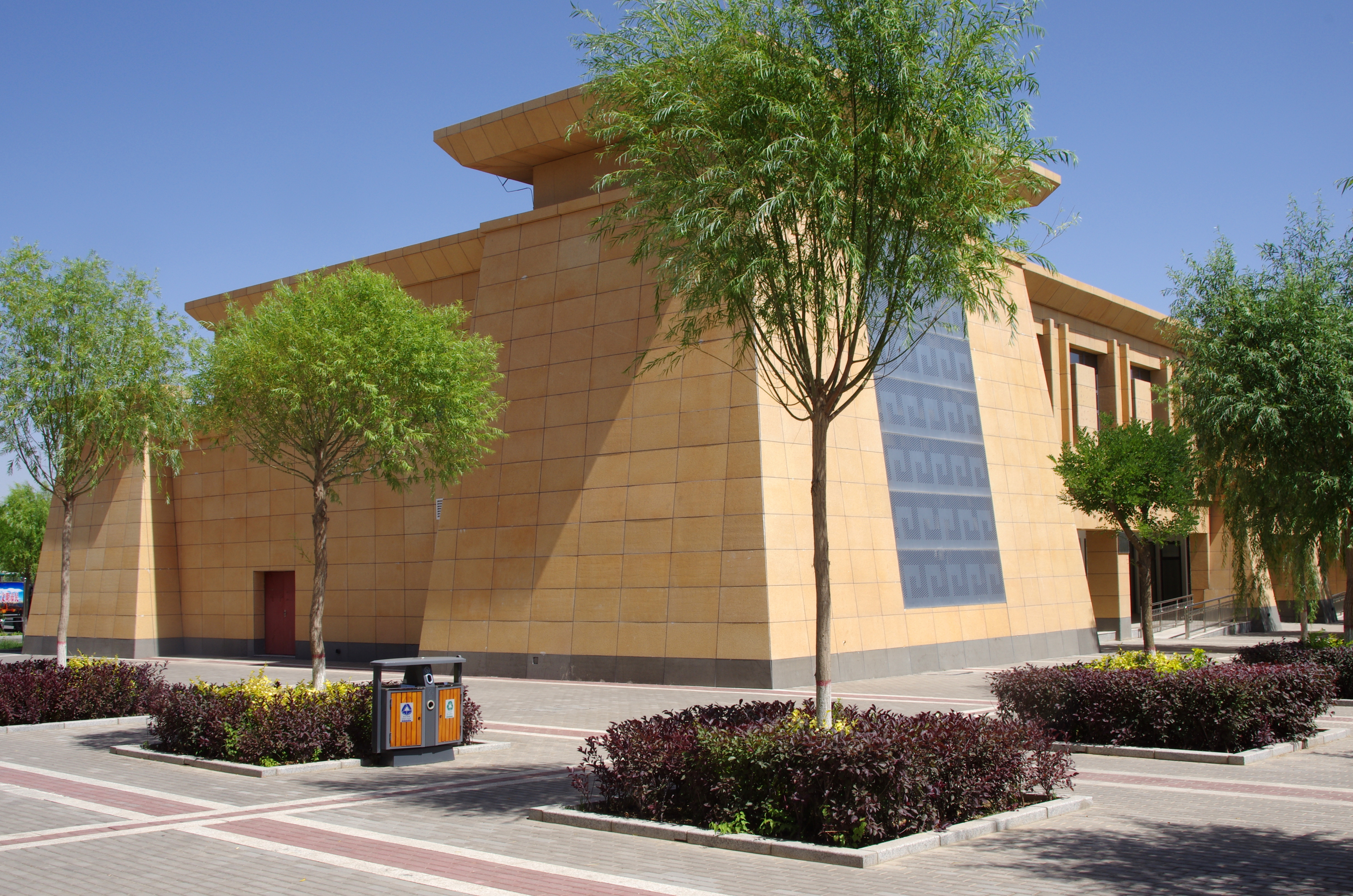
Two public bus routes connect Jiayuguan South railway station to the Jiayuguan city centre.

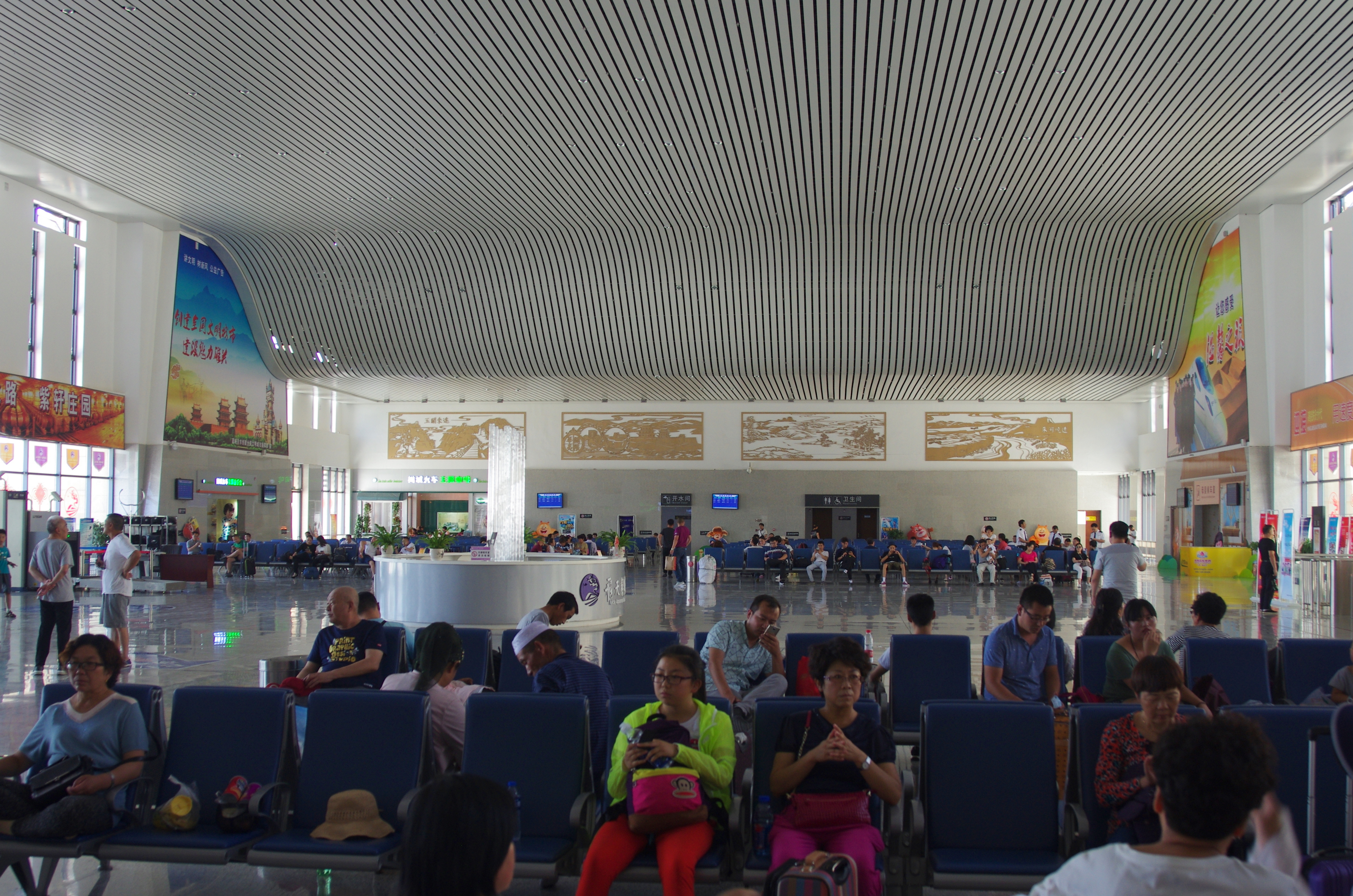
The single large waiting hall

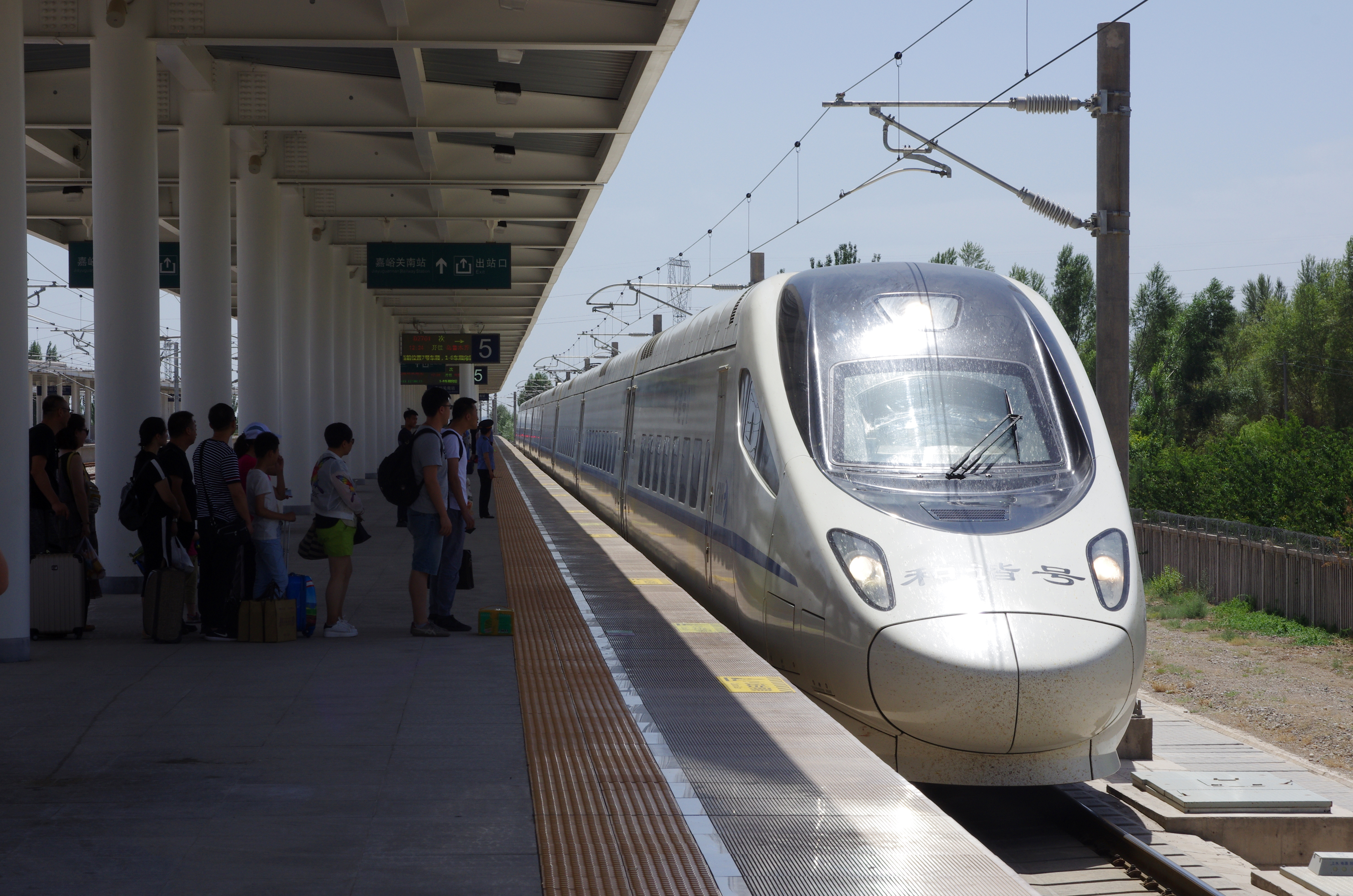
Westbound EMU high speed train to Urumqi arrives on Platform 5
Jiayuguan South
