= Ürümqi South railway station =

Railway station in China

Wulumuqinan 乌鲁木齐南
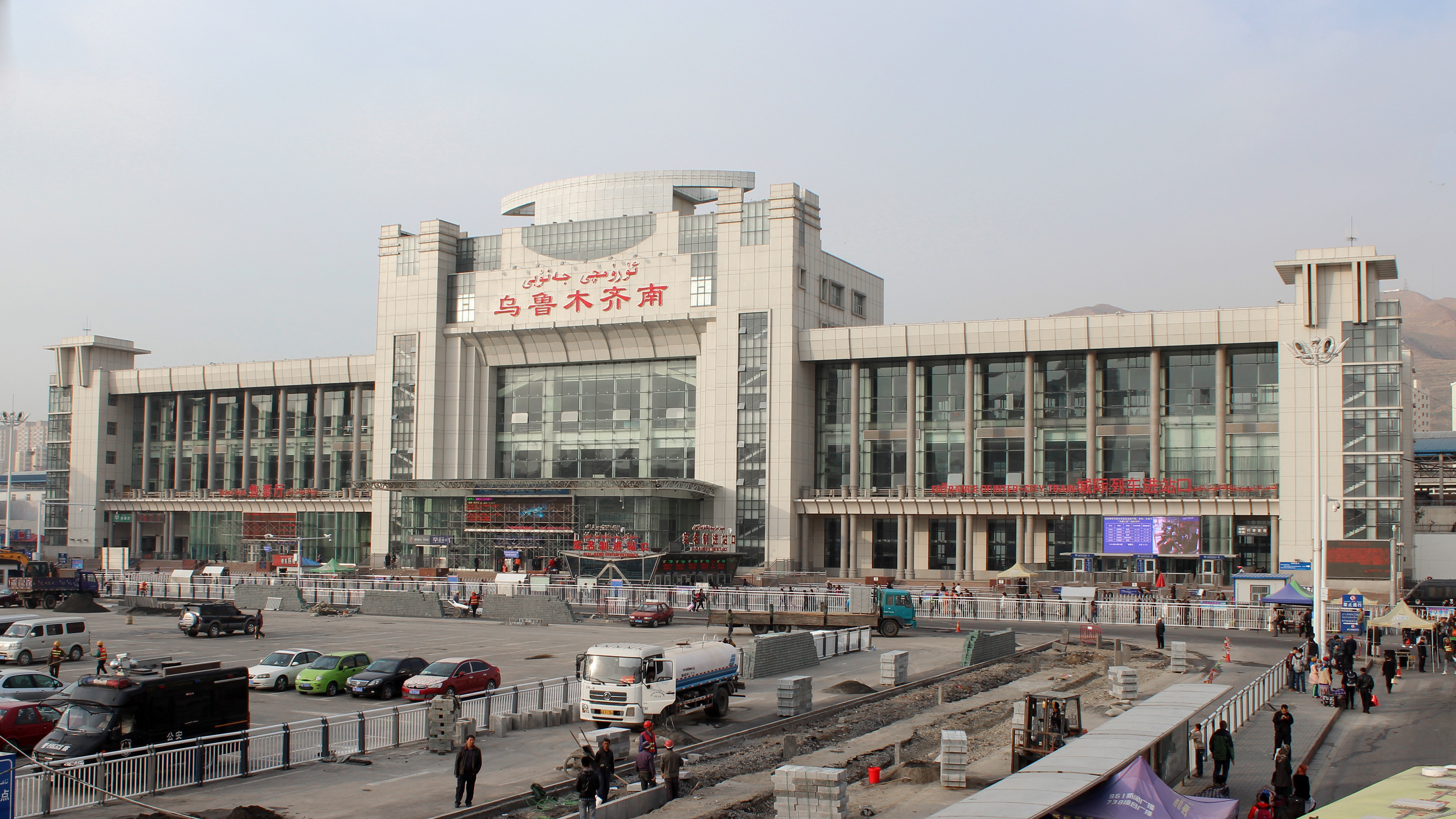
- Ürümqi South railway station

General information
- Other names: Ürümqi South
- Location: Nanzhan Lu, Saybagh District, Ürümqi, Xinjiang; China
- Coordinates: 43°46′45″N 87°35′00″E
- Operated by: China Railway Ürümqi Group, China Railway Corporation
- Line(s): Lanxin railway, Northern Xinjiang railway
- Platforms: 3
- Connections: Bus terminal

History
- Opened: 1962
- Previous names: Ürümqi

Ürümqi South railway station (simplified Chinese: 乌鲁木齐南站; traditional Chinese: 烏魯木齊南站; pinyin: Wūlǔmùqínán Zhàn; Uyghur: ئۈرۈمچی جەنۇبىي بېكىتى, romanized: Ürümchi jenubiy békiti, USY: Үрүмчи Җәнувий Векити) is a railway station of the Lanzhou–Xinjiang, Northern Xinjiang and the Second Ürümqi–Jinghe railways. The station is located in Ürümqi, Xinjiang Uyghur Autonomous Region, China. The name of the station was Ürümqi railway station from 1962 until 1 September 2014. This name is now assigned to the newly built high-speed railway station of the Lanzhou–Ürümqi High-Speed Railway.

== History ==
The station was constructed in 1962. On 18 May 2002, that station was demolished to make way for construction of the current station which was opened on 25 April 2004.

On 30 April 2014, a terrorist attack occurred at the station, which left three people dead and 79 injured.

== See also ==
- Ürümqi railway station
- Alashankou railway station
- Kashgar railway station
- Southern Xinjiang railway

Preceding station	China Railway	Following station
Terminus	Northern Xinjiang railway	Ürümqi towards Alashankou
