= China Railway Ürümqi Group =

Chinese railway operator

China Railway Ürümqi Group Co., Ltd.
- Company type: State-owned enterprise
- Industry: Railway operations
- Predecessor: Ürümqi Railway Administration
- Founded: 19 November 2017
- Headquarters: 1 Hexi W Road, Xinshi, Ürümqi, Xinjiang, China
- Area served: Xinjiang; Western Gansu
- Owner: Government of China
- Parent: China Railway
- Website: Official Weibo Website

China Railway Ürümqi Group
- Simplified Chinese: 中国铁路乌鲁木齐局集团
- Traditional Chinese: 中國鐵路烏魯木齊局集團
Transcriptions
Standard Mandarin
- Hanyu Pinyin: Zhōngguó Tiělù Wūlǔmùqí Jú Jítuán

Ürümqi Railway Administration
- Simplified Chinese: 乌鲁木齐铁路局
- Traditional Chinese: 烏魯木齊鐵路局
Transcriptions
Standard Mandarin
- Hanyu Pinyin: Wūlǔmùqí Tiělù Jú

CR Ürümqi
- Simplified Chinese: 乌铁
- Traditional Chinese: 烏鐵
Transcriptions
Standard Mandarin
- Hanyu Pinyin: Wūtiě

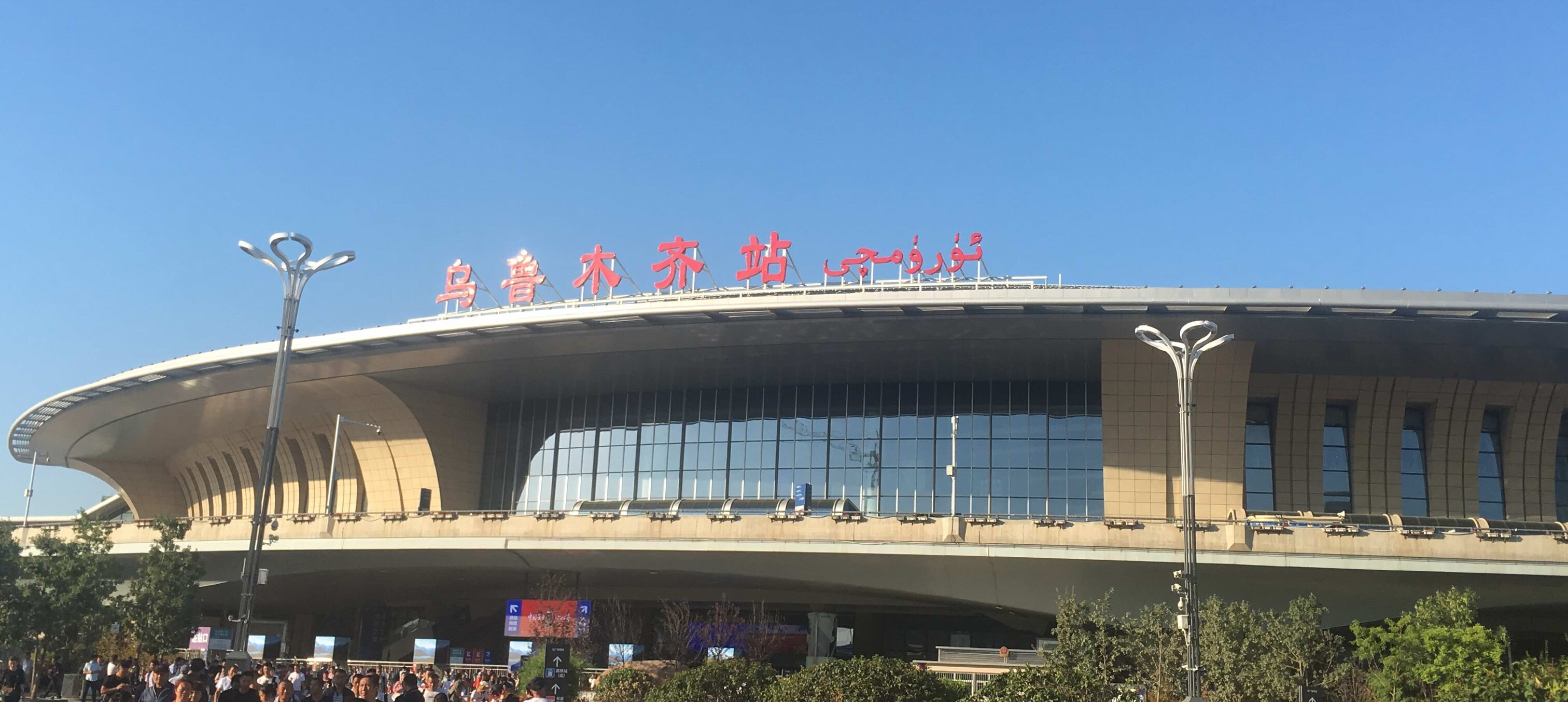
Ürümqi railway station

China Railway Ürümqi Group, officially abbreviated as CR Ürümqi or CR-Ürümqi, also known as CR Xinjiang, formerly, Ürümqi Railway Administration is a subsidiaries company under the jurisdiction of the China Railway (formerly the Ministry of Railway). The railway administration was reorganized as a company in November 2017.

It supervises the railway network within Xinjiang and Western Gansu.

== Hub stations ==
- Ürümqi
  - Ürümqi, Ürümqi South, Ürümqi West
- Korgas
  - Korgas
- Alashankou
  - Alashankou
