= Yuquan =

Yuquan may refer to:

== Places in China ==
- Yuquan District, a district in Hohhot, Inner Mongolia
- Jade Spring Hill, or Yuquan Hill, a hill in Summer Palace, Beijing
- Yuquan Campus, Zhejiang University, a campus of Zhejiang University in Hangzhou, Zhejiang

=== Towns ===
- Yuquan, Chongqing (鱼泉), in Yunyang County, Chongqing
- Yuquan, Jiayuguan (峪泉), Gansu
- Yuquan, Tianshui (玉泉), Gansu
- Yuquan, Shanxi (玉泉), in Tianzhen County, Shanxi
- Yuquan, Mianzhu (玉泉), Sichuan

=== Subdistricts ===
- Yuquan Subdistrict, Meitan County (鱼泉街道), Guizhou
- Yuquan Subdistrict, Harbin (玉泉街道), Heilongjiang
- Yuquan Subdistrict, Jiyuan (玉泉街道), Henan
- Yuquan Subdistrict, Dangyang (玉泉街道), Hubei
- Yuquan Subdistrict, Panzhihua (玉泉街道), Sichuan

== Other ==
- Yuquan Shenxiu (606–706), Chinese Chan Buddhist master
- Yu Quan, Chinese soft-rock duet
- Yuquan (mythology), a place in Chinese mythology

== See also ==
- Yuquan Temple (disambiguation)
