= Jiayuguan =

Jiayuguan (嘉峪关) may refer to two locations in Gansu, China:

- Jiayuguan (pass), pass of the Great Wall of China
- Jiayuguan City, prefecture-level city
