= Jiayuguan Solar Park =

Photovoltaic power station in Gansu, China

- Country: China
- Location: Jiayuguan City
- Coordinates: 39°41′N 99°00′E
- Status: Operational

Solar farm
- Type: Flat-panel PV

Power generation
- Nameplate capacity: 52 MW

The Jiayuguan Solar Park is a 52 MWp photovoltaic power station located in the Jiayuguan City region, in China. It uses fixed tilt arrays. The first stage, 40 MWp, was completed in 2012.

== See also ==
- List of photovoltaic power stations
- Photovoltaic power station
- Photovoltaics
