= July 1 Glacier =

Glacier in Jiayuguan City, China

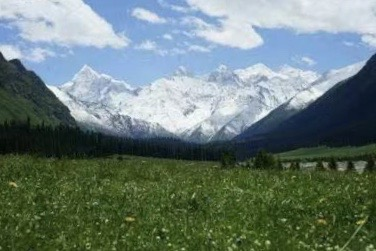

- Location within China
- Interactive map of July 1 Glacier
- Type: Mountain glacier
- Location: Jiayuguan City, Gansu, China, in the hinterland of the Qilian Mountains
- Coordinates: 39°16′35″N 97°43′05″E
- Area: 2062.72 square kilometers
- Length: 3.5 km (2.2 mi)

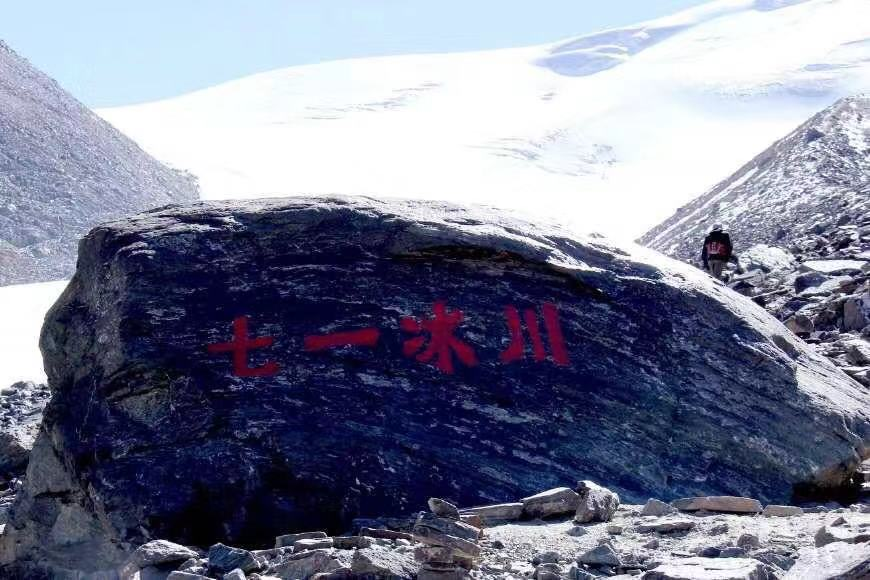
The July 1 Glacier
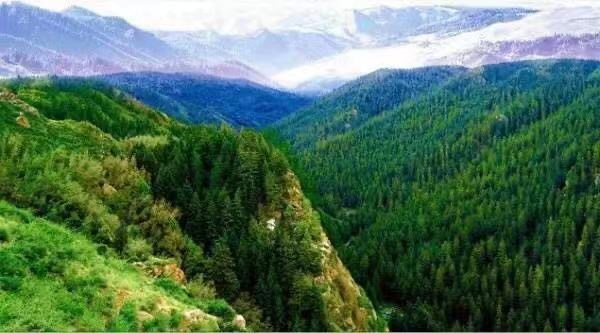
A distant view of the July 1 Glacier
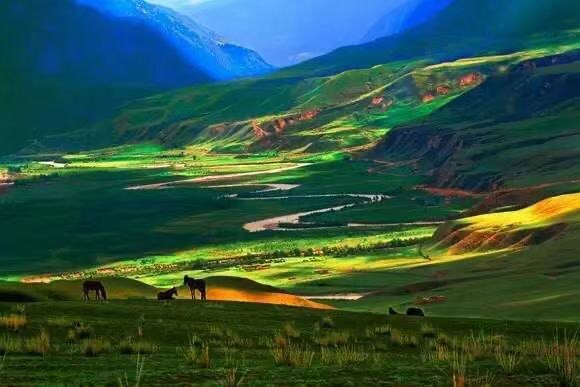
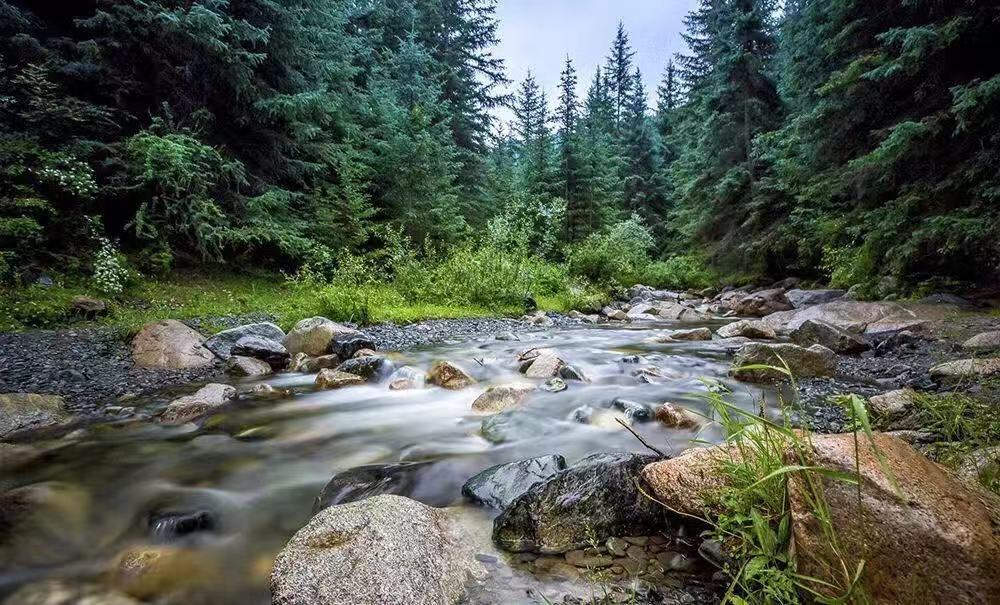

The July 1 Glacier or Qiyi Glacier (Chinese: 七一冰川) is a glacier in Jiayuguan City, Gansu, China, and on the northern slope of the Tola Mountain in the Qilian Mountains. It is the closest glacier to cities in Asia, but it has been shrinking in recent years. This glacier was discovered by a geological worker of the Lanzhou Branch of the Chinese Academy of Sciences and a glacier scholar of the Soviet Union on July 1, 1958. The glacier is on a hillside with a slope that is less than 45 degrees. The elevation of the ice peak is 5158.8 meters, and the elevation of the front edge of the ice tongue is 4304 meters. The average thickness of the ice layer of the glacier is 78 meters, and the thickest part can even reach 120 meters. The total length of the July 1 glacier is 3.5 kilometers, and the widest place is 2.4 kilometers. There are 160 million cubic meters of water storage. The Tourist Area in the July 1 Glacier covers about 4 square kilometers.

== Location ==
The July 1 Glacier is located in the hinterland of the Qilian Mountains. The Qilian Mountains is the group of parallel pleated fault block mountains on the south side of the Hexi Corridor. There are 3,066 glaciers on the mountains, and the July 1 Glacier is one of them with a total area of 2062.72 square kilometers and glacial reserves of 114.5 billion cubic meters.

== Formation ==
The July 1 Glacier was formed about 200 million years ago, and it is covered with snow all the year. Glaciers are a form of existence of water, and are transformed through a series of changes by snow. To form a glacier, there must first be a certain amount of solid precipitation, including snow, fog and hail.

Glaciers exist in extremely cold places. The Antarctic and North Pole on the earth are extremely cold all year round. In other regions, only high-altitude mountains can form glaciers. The July 1 Glacier develops on high mountains, so this kind of glacier is called mountain glacier.

In high mountains, the conditions for forming glaciers not only require a certain altitude, but also require that the mountains are not too steep. If the mountain peaks are too steep, the snow will fall down the slope and leave nothing. Snowflakes will change as soon as they fall to the ground. With the change of external conditions and time, snowflakes will become spherical snow that completely loses its crystal characteristics, which is called grain snow. Over time, the hardness of the snow and the tightness between grains continue to increase. The large and small grains of snow squeeze each other and are closely embedded, and the pores between them shrink and disappear. The brightness and transparency of the layer of the snow gradually weaken. Some air is also enclosed inside, which forms glacial ice. Glacier ice is milky white when it is first formed. After a long period of time, the glacial ice become denser and harder, and the air bubbles inside gradually decrease and turn into old ice with blue crystals. Under the function of gravity, glacier ice slowly flows down the slope (of course, the speed is very slow), and a glacier is formed.

== History ==
In the 1950s, in order to develop and construct the Hexi Corridor, Gansu Province and the Chinese Academy of Sciences agreed to carry out large-scale investigations on the Qilian Mountain glaciers, and planned to use the semi-annual period to clarify the distribution and quantity of glacial resources in the Qilian Mountains. Ice and snow created conditions for the irrigation of the Hexi Corridor. Therefore, within 10 days, China's first glacier expedition team, the Alpine Ice and Snow Utilization Research Team, was formed. The team consisted of hundreds of people and hired Glacier expert Dawl Gusin of the Soviet Union as a consultant. China's famous glaciologist Shi Yafeng served as the vice captain. The July 1 Glacier is the first glacier discovered by this team.

Due to global warming, the July 1 Glacier is shrinking.

On July 24, 2017, a reporter captured the change in the July 1 glacier that is located in the hinterland of the Qilian mountains: compared with two years ago, the ice tongue had shrunk significantly. The result of comparing two catalogings of Glaciers in the Qilian Mountains show that in the past 50 years, 509 glaciers in the Qilian Mountains have disappeared and the area has decreased by 420 square kilometers.
