= 2016 Dangyang explosion =

Chinese coal power plant explosion

- Date: 11 August 2016
- Time: 15:20 CST (07:20 UTC)
- Location: Dangyang, Hubei, China
- Cause: Accident of production safety responsibility
- Deaths: 22
- Injuries: 4

The 2016 Dangyang explosion was an explosion that occurred at the coal-fired power plant of Madian Gangue Power Generation Company located in Dangyang, Hubei, China on 11 August 2016 at 15:20 local time (07:20 UTC). Twenty-one people were killed and five were injured, three critically.

== Events ==
The explosion involved a high-pressure steam pipe, which had burst and began leaking during a debugging process for the unfinished power plant.

On 13 August, it was reported by the State Administration of Work Safety that the death toll had risen to 22. The explosion also caused the power plant and nearby companies to close and prompted a work safety overhaul to be launched in the city.
