= Dangyang =

Dangyang 当阳市 Tangyang
- County-level city
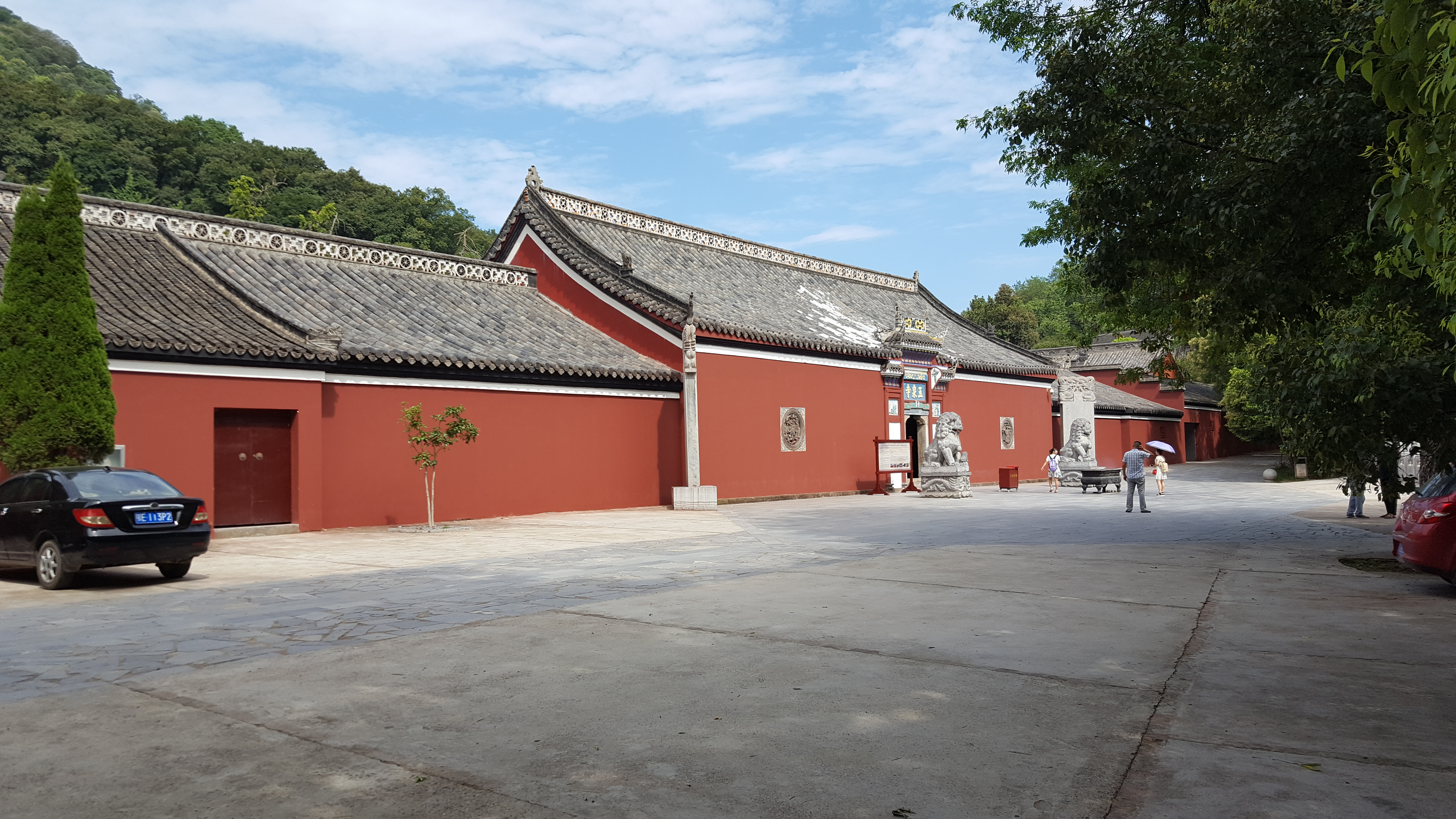
- Dangyang Yuquan Temple

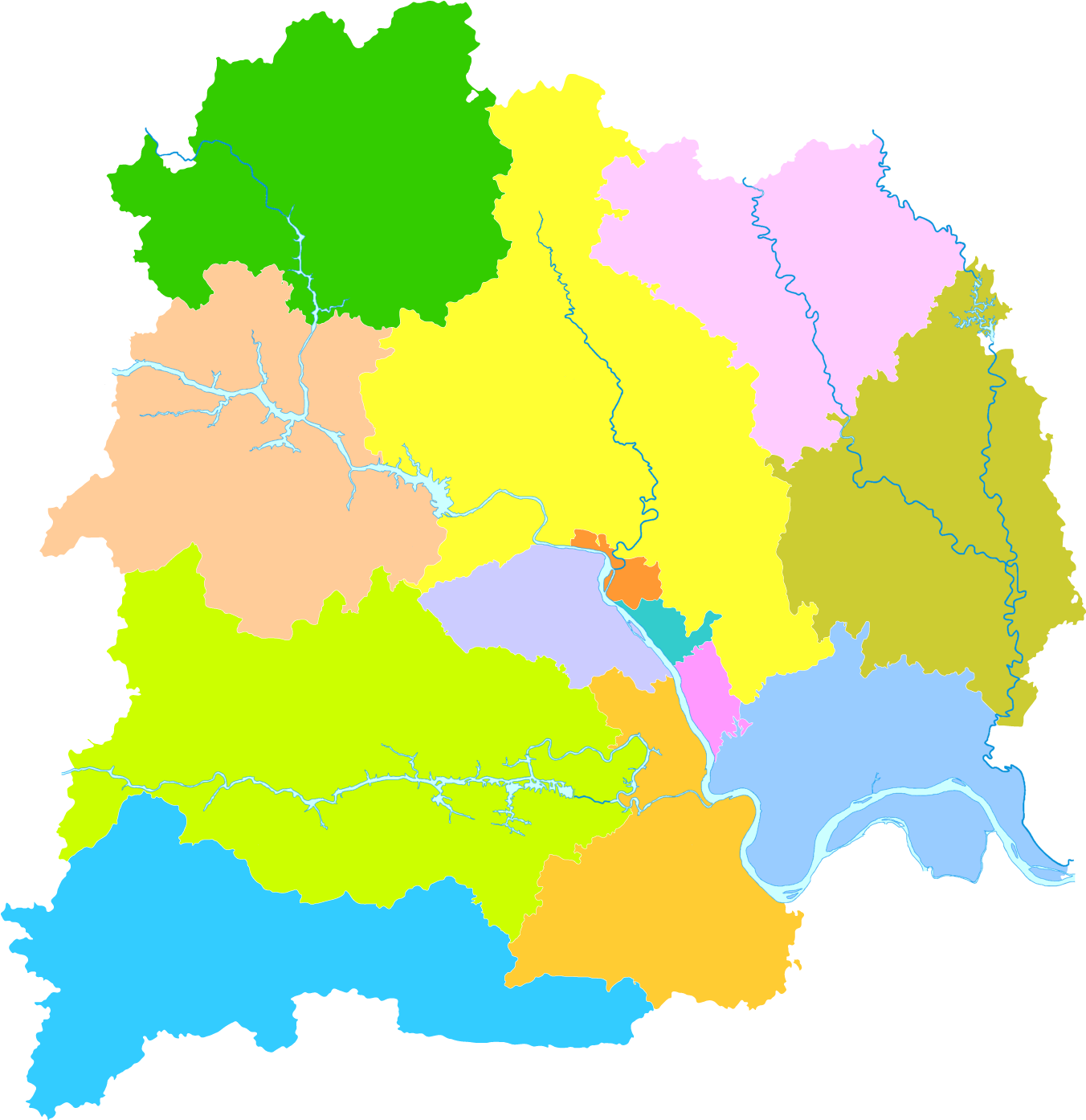
- Dangyang is the easternmost division on this map of Yichang

- Location in Hubei
- Coordinates: 30°49′16″N 111°47′20″E
- Country: People's Republic of China
- Province: Hubei
- Prefecture-level city: Yichang

Area
  - County-level city: 2,038 km^{2} (787 sq mi)
  - Urban: 220.30 km^{2} (85.06 sq mi)

Population (2020)
  - County-level city: 397,465
  - Density: 195.0/km^{2} (505.1/sq mi)
  - Urban: 224,057
- Website: hbdy.gov.cn

Dangyang (simplified Chinese: 当阳; traditional Chinese: 當陽; pinyin: Dāngyáng) is a city in western Hubei province, People's Republic of China, lying 70 kilometres (43 mi) east of the Gezhouba Dam on the Yangtze River. During the Western Han dynasty (206–24 BC). Emperor Jing of Han established an administration in Dangyang on an area of 2,000 square kilometres (770 sq mi). In 1988 the State Council of the People's Republic of China elevated this from a county to a county-level city, and is currently under the administration of the prefecture-level city of Yichang.

Dangyang used to be a strategic point in ancient wars. Sun Bin and Pang Juan, two famous strategists of the Warring States period (475–221 BC) studied military affairs from Gui Guzi at Daxian Cave in Dangyang. The Green Woods Uprising was launched in Dangyang and several battles were fought in Dangyang during the Three Kingdoms period (AD 220–280).

Today Dangyang is a rapidly growing modern city with a population of over 100,000. While agriculture remains a key industry in Dangyang, industrial production now includes output in the areas of foodstuffs, building materials, textiles, chemicals, electronics, machinery, energy and packaging.

On August 11, 2016, an explosion at a chemical factory in Dangyang killed 21 people and injured at least 5.

== Administrative divisions ==
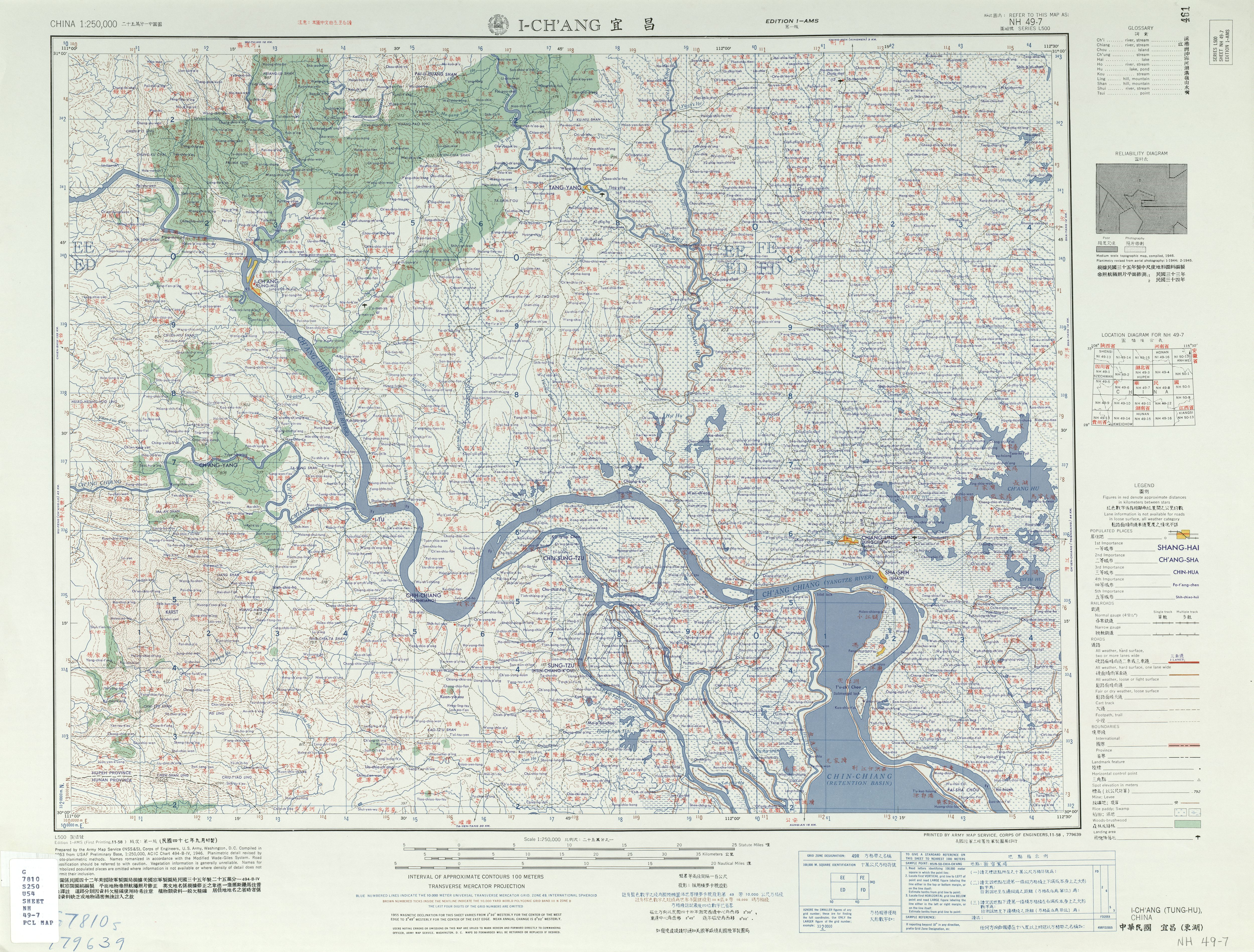
Map including Dangyang (labeled as TANG-YANG 當陽) (1953)

Three subdistricts:

- Yuyang Subdistrict (玉阳街道), Baling Subdistrict (坝陵街道), Yuquan Subdistrict (玉泉街道)

Seven towns:

- Lianghe (两河镇), Herong (河溶镇), Yuxi (淯溪镇/育溪镇), Miaoqian (庙前镇), Wangdian (王店镇), Banyue (半月镇), Caobuhu (草埠湖镇)

== Climate ==
Climate data for Dangyang, elevation 92 m (302 ft), (1991–2020 normals, extremes 1991–present)
| Month | Jan | Feb | Mar | Apr | May | Jun | Jul | Aug | Sep | Oct | Nov | Dec | Year |
|---|---|---|---|---|---|---|---|---|---|---|---|---|---|
| Record high °C (°F) | 21.8 (71.2) | 26.4 (79.5) | 31.3 (88.3) | 35.8 (96.4) | 37.9 (100.2) | 38.2 (100.8) | 39.5 (103.1) | 39.6 (103.3) | 38.7 (101.7) | 35.2 (95.4) | 30.1 (86.2) | 23.4 (74.1) | 39.6 (103.3) |
| Mean daily maximum °C (°F) | 8.5 (47.3) | 11.6 (52.9) | 16.5 (61.7) | 22.7 (72.9) | 27.2 (81.0) | 30.1 (86.2) | 32.4 (90.3) | 32.2 (90.0) | 28.4 (83.1) | 23.0 (73.4) | 16.8 (62.2) | 10.9 (51.6) | 21.7 (71.1) |
| Daily mean °C (°F) | 4.3 (39.7) | 6.9 (44.4) | 11.4 (52.5) | 17.2 (63.0) | 22.0 (71.6) | 25.6 (78.1) | 28.0 (82.4) | 27.6 (81.7) | 23.5 (74.3) | 17.9 (64.2) | 11.9 (53.4) | 6.4 (43.5) | 16.9 (62.4) |
| Mean daily minimum °C (°F) | 1.3 (34.3) | 3.4 (38.1) | 7.4 (45.3) | 12.9 (55.2) | 17.8 (64.0) | 21.9 (71.4) | 24.6 (76.3) | 24.1 (75.4) | 20.0 (68.0) | 14.4 (57.9) | 8.5 (47.3) | 3.2 (37.8) | 13.3 (55.9) |
| Record low °C (°F) | −8.6 (16.5) | −4.9 (23.2) | −1.6 (29.1) | 2.4 (36.3) | 8.3 (46.9) | 15.0 (59.0) | 18.2 (64.8) | 16.0 (60.8) | 11.0 (51.8) | 3.4 (38.1) | −2.5 (27.5) | −8.4 (16.9) | −8.6 (16.5) |
| Average precipitation mm (inches) | 24.3 (0.96) | 31.8 (1.25) | 54.4 (2.14) | 89.2 (3.51) | 138.1 (5.44) | 144.9 (5.70) | 178.6 (7.03) | 137.8 (5.43) | 75.7 (2.98) | 71.6 (2.82) | 40.3 (1.59) | 14.3 (0.56) | 1,001 (39.41) |
| Average precipitation days (≥ 0.1 mm) | 7.1 | 8.2 | 10.8 | 11.8 | 12.7 | 11.7 | 12.5 | 10.2 | 9.1 | 10.1 | 8.4 | 6.4 | 119 |
| Average snowy days | 3.7 | 2.5 | 1.1 | 0 | 0 | 0 | 0 | 0 | 0 | 0 | 0.3 | 1.6 | 9.2 |
| Average relative humidity (%) | 71 | 71 | 72 | 74 | 73 | 78 | 80 | 77 | 73 | 74 | 75 | 71 | 74 |
| Mean monthly sunshine hours | 77.1 | 83.2 | 117.3 | 137.2 | 144.5 | 137.3 | 175.7 | 184.6 | 138.3 | 127.9 | 109.0 | 92.3 | 1,524.4 |
| Percentage possible sunshine | 24 | 26 | 31 | 35 | 34 | 33 | 41 | 45 | 38 | 37 | 35 | 29 | 34 |
Source: China Meteorological Administration
