= Yuquan Temple =

Yuquan Temple or Jade Spring Temple may refer to these temples:

- Yuquan Temple (Dangyang), Buddhist temple in Dangyang, Hubei, China
- Yuquan Temple (Changsha), Buddhist temple in Changsha, Hunan, China

== See also ==
- Gyokusen-ji, Buddhist temple in Shimoda, Shizuoka Prefecture, Japan
