= Yuquan, Jiayuguan =

Yuquan 峪泉镇
- Town
- Location in Gansu
- Coordinates: 39.8097°N 98.2313°E
- Country: People's Republic of China
- Province: Gansu
- Prefecture-level city: Jiayuguan City
- Time zone: UTC+8 (China Standard)

Yuquan (Chinese: 峪泉; pinyin: Yùquán) is a town in Jiayuguan City, Gansu province, China. As of 2020, it administers the following three villages:

- Jiayuguan Village (嘉峪关村)
- Huangcaoying Village (黄草营村)
- Duanshankou Village (段山口村)
