= Yuquan Temple (Changsha) =

Buddhist temple in Tianxin District of Changsha, Hunan, China

- 玉泉寺
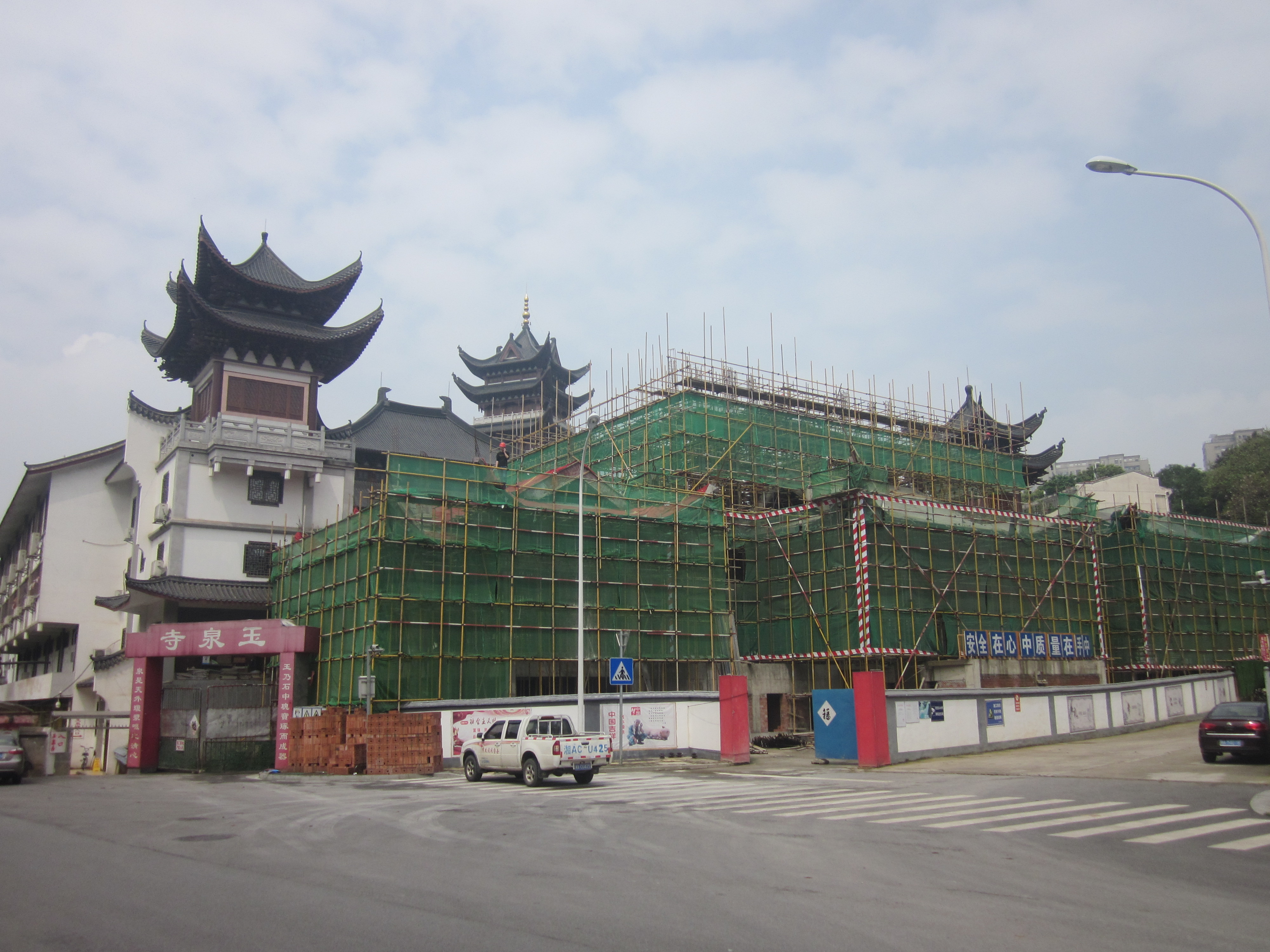
- Yuquan Temple.

- Location within Hunan

Religion
- Affiliation: Buddhism
- Deity: Linji school

Location
- Location: Tianxin District, Changsha, Hunan
- Country: China
- Interactive map of Yuquan Temple
- Coordinates: 28°09′43″N 112°58′34″E

Architecture
- Style: Chinese architecture
- Established: 1368
- Completed: 2015 (reconstruction)

Yuquan Temple (Chinese: 玉泉寺; pinyin: Yùquán Sì), formerly known as Palace of the Goddess (simplified Chinese: 天妃宫; traditional Chinese: 天妃宮; pinyin: Tiānfēi Gōng), is a Buddhist temple located in Tianxin District of Changsha, Hunan.

== History ==
Yuquan Temple was originally built in 1368, at the dawn of Ming dynasty (1368–1644).

In 1731, in the 9th year of Yongzheng period of the Qing dynasty (1644–1911), Zhang Fengyi (张凤仪), the local politician added a statue of Mazu to the temple and renamed it "Palace of the Goddess". It was repaired and renovated in 1789, during the reign of Qianlong Emperor. In 1852, it was restored after war. Termites bit the pillars of the halls of Yuquan Temple, it was refurbished in 1877, in the ruling of Guangxu Emperor.

In 2006, in order to support urban construction, the whole temple was relocated to Jinpenling (金盆岭) of Tianxin District. The foundation-laying ceremony was held in February 2009. The construction of Yuquan Temple was completed in 2015.

== Architecture ==
The temple consists of more than 10 buildings, including Shanmen, Bell tower, Drum tower, Mahavira Hall, and the Buddhist Texts Library and east and west annex halls.

The Mahavira Hall is the main hall in the temple. It was built in November 2012. It is 25.3-metre (83 ft) high and covers an area of 1,923-square-metre (20,700 sq ft).

== Gallery ==
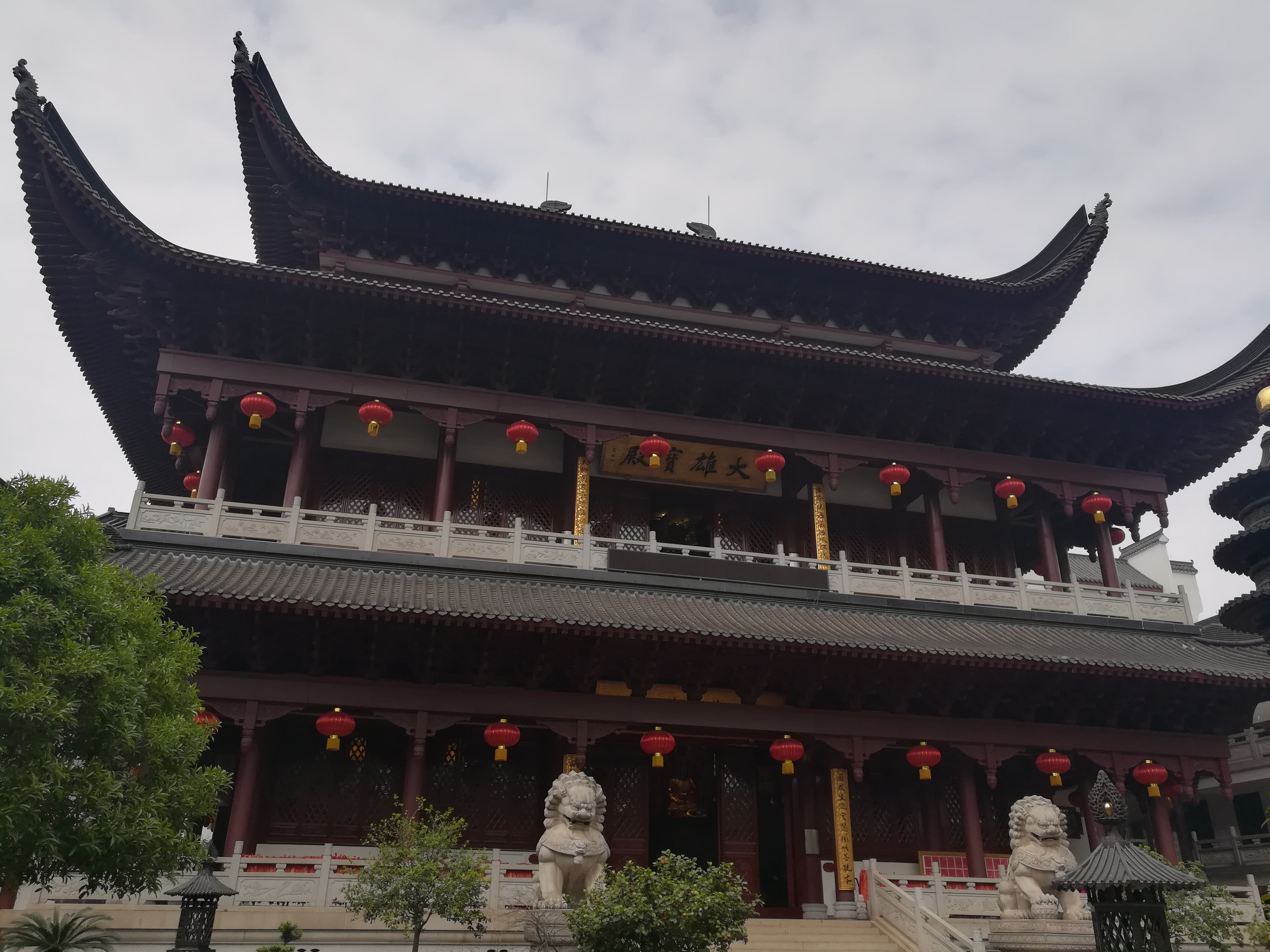
Mahavira Hall.

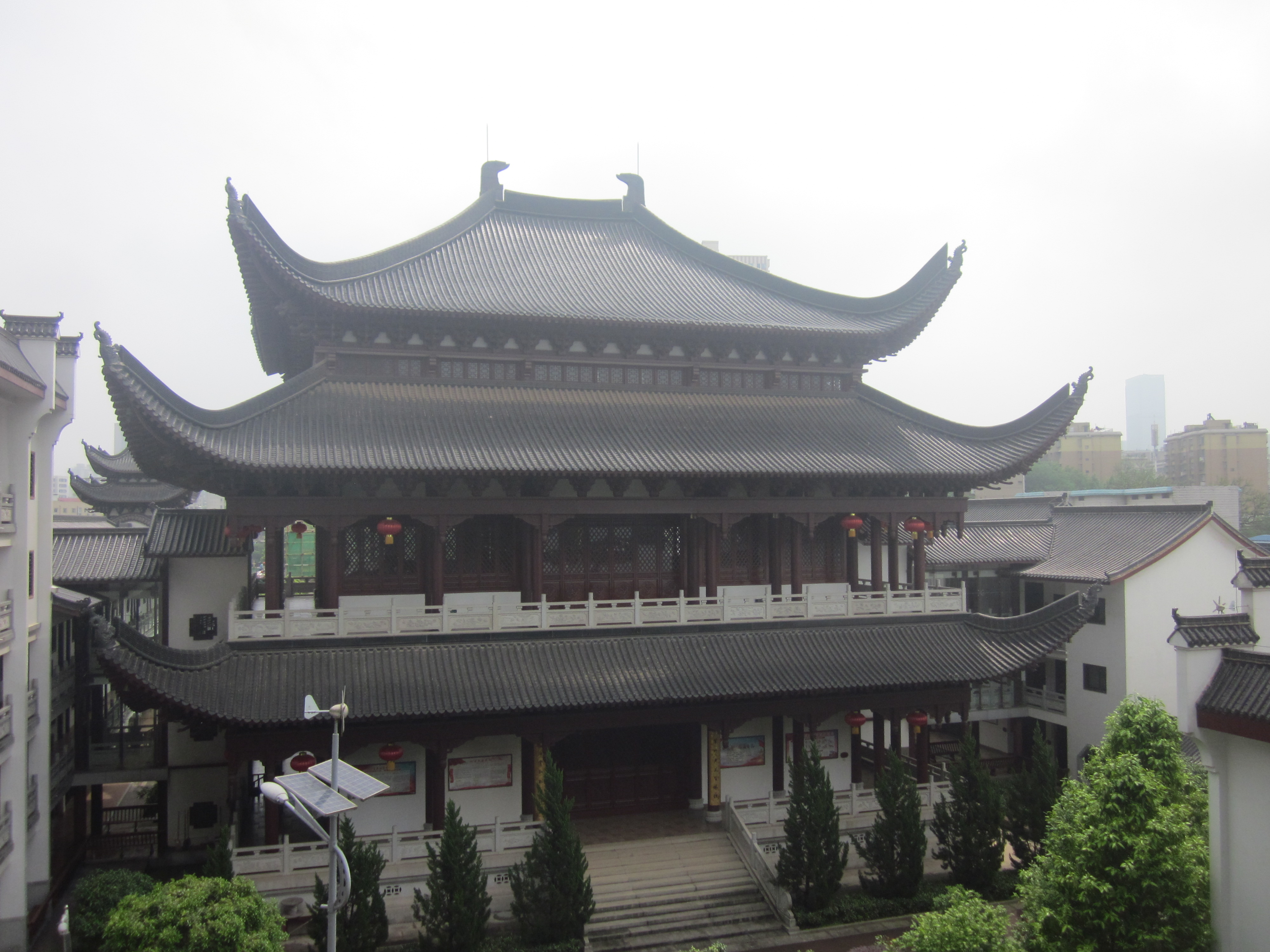
Mahavira Hall.

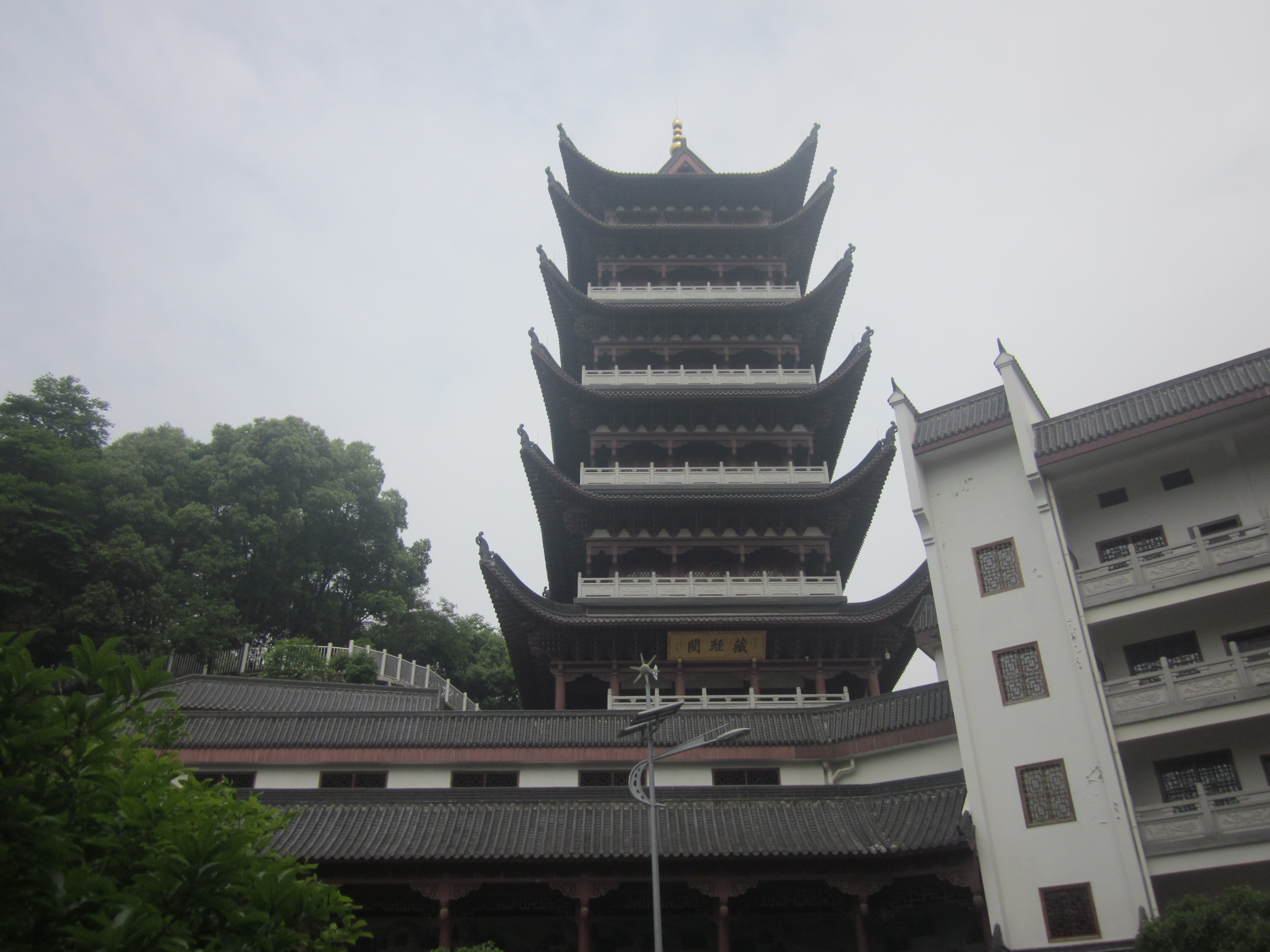
Buddhist Texts Library.

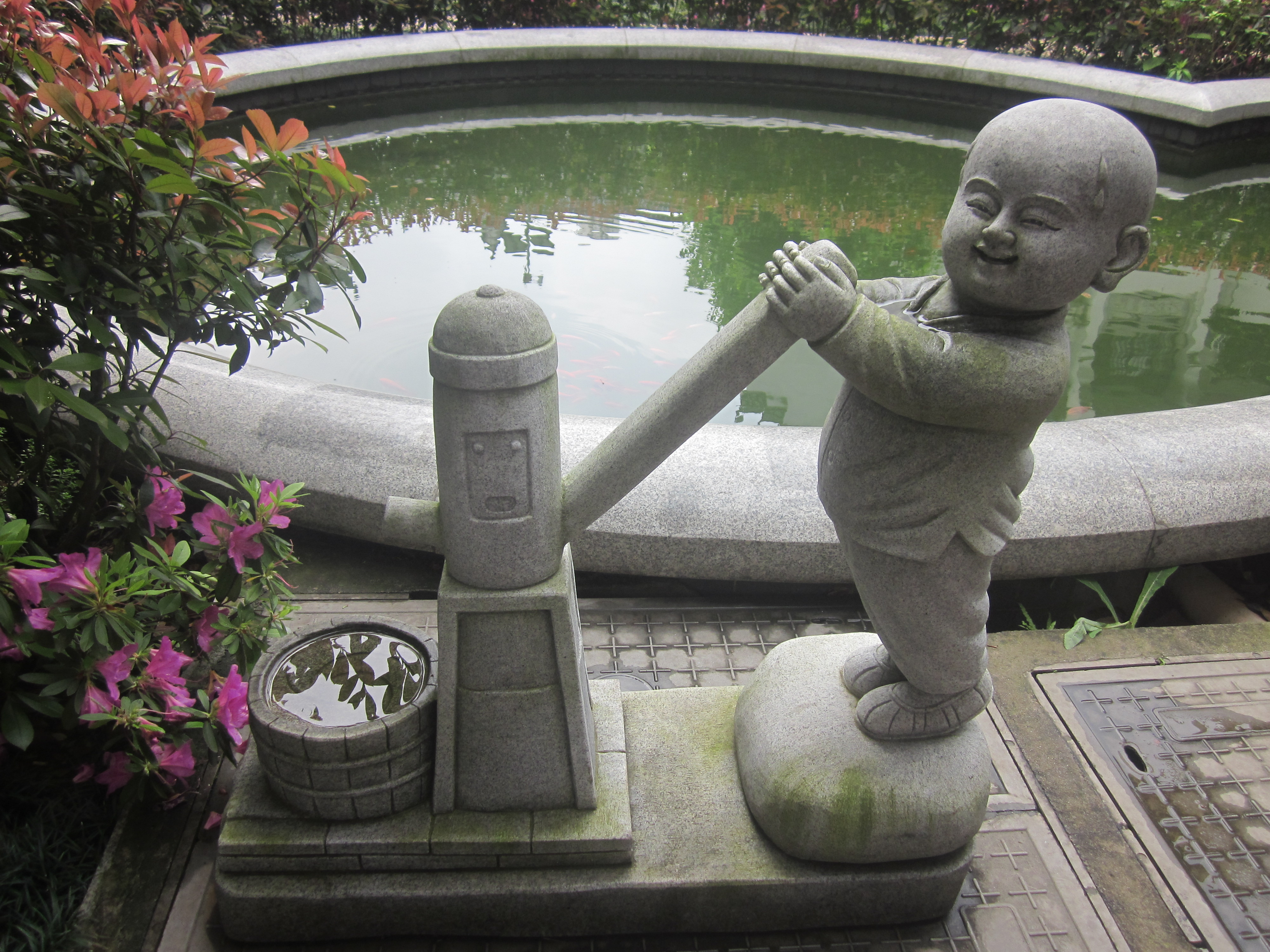
a statue of arhat.
