= Yuquan Subdistrict, Dangyang =

Yuquan Subdistrict 玉泉街道
- Subdistrict
- Location in Hubei
- Coordinates: 30°49′48″N 111°46′31″E
- Country: People's Republic of China
- Province: Hubei
- Prefecture-level city: Yichang
- County-level city: Dangyang
- Time zone: UTC+8 (China Standard)

Yuquan Subdistrict (Chinese: 玉泉街道; pinyin: Yùquán Jiēdào) is a subdistrict in Dangyang, Hubei, China. As of 2020, it administers Niangniangmiao Residential Community (娘娘庙社区) and the following 15 villages:

- Yuquan Village
- Zilong Village (子龙村)
- Heyi Village (合意村)
- Yanwumiao Village (岩屋庙村)
- Guanlingmiao Village (关陵庙村)
- Xiongfeng Village (雄风村)
- Guandaohe Village (官道河村)
- Ganhe Village (干河村)
- Qingxi Village (清溪村)
- Zaolin Village (枣林村)
- Sanqiao Village (三桥村)
- Liulin Village (柳林村)
- Jinsha Village (金沙村)
- Jiaodi Village (焦堤村)
- Baibaozhai Village (百宝寨村)

== See also ==
- List of township-level divisions of Hubei
