= Yuquan, Tianshui =

Yuquan 玉泉镇
- Town
- Location in Gansu
- Coordinates: 34°35′6″N 105°43′34″E
- Country: People's Republic of China
- Province: Gansu
- Prefecture-level city: Tianshui
- District: Qinzhou District
- Time zone: UTC+8 (China Standard)

Yuquan (Chinese: 玉泉; pinyin: Yùquán) is a town in Qinzhou District, Tianshui, Gansu province, China. As of 2020, it administers the following 32 residential neighborhoods:

- Yuquan
- Nanhu (南湖)
- Shuangxi (双西)
- Wangjiamo (王家磨)
- Yanhe (闫河)
- Sunjiaping (孙家坪)
- Binglingsi (冰凌寺)
- Liguanwan (李官湾)
- Caojiaya (曹家崖)
- Qilidun (七里墩)
- Yanchi (盐池)
- Xujiashan (徐家山)
- Yanpu (烟铺)
- Liujiazhuang (刘家庄)
- Malan (马兰)
- Huangcheng (皇城)
- Wangjiaping (王家坪)
- Yanghe (杨何)
- Shimaping (石马坪)
- Zuojiachang (左家场)
- Wayaopo (瓦窑坡)
- Zaoyuan (枣园)
- Dongtuanzhuang (东团庄)
- Lianting (莲亭)
- Tianshuijun (天水郡)
- Nuanhewan (暖和湾)
- Dongshili (东十里)
- Dongfanghong (东方红)
- Fuxi Road (伏羲路)
- Yanxin (闫新)
- Xituanzhuang (西团庄)
- Xishili (西十里)
