= Jiayuguan City =

Jiayuguan City 嘉峪关市 Chia-yü-kuan
- Prefecture-level city
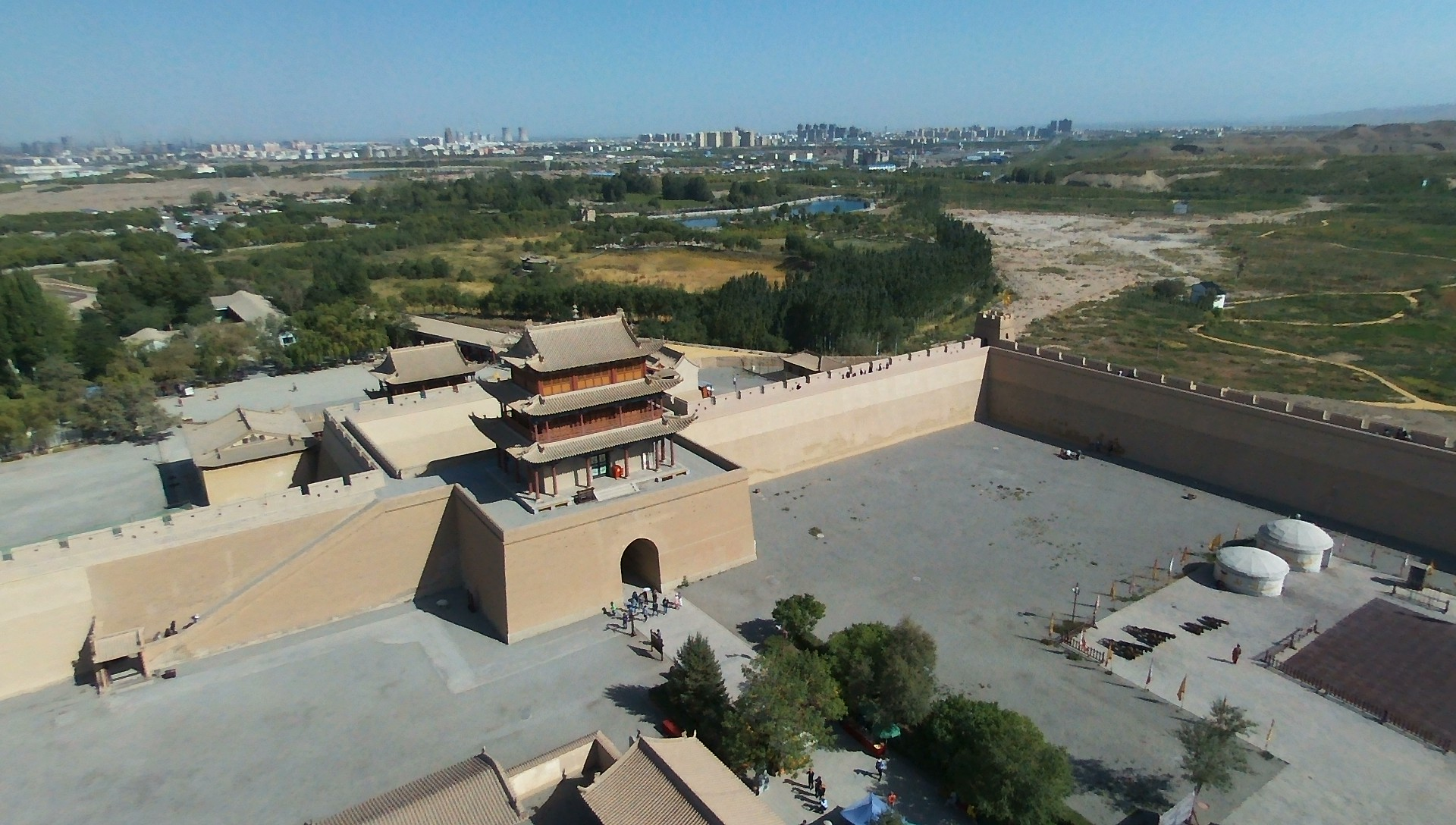
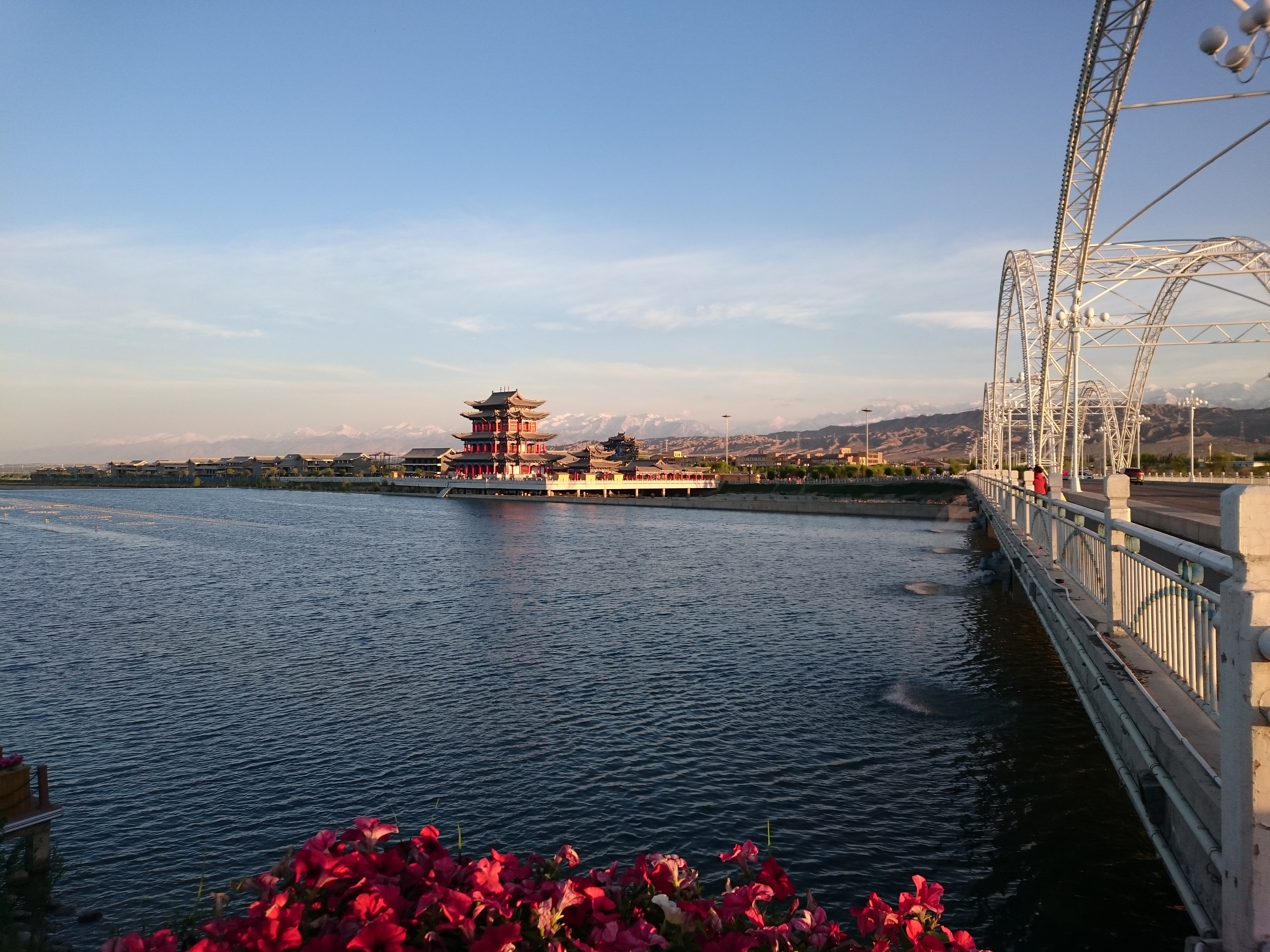
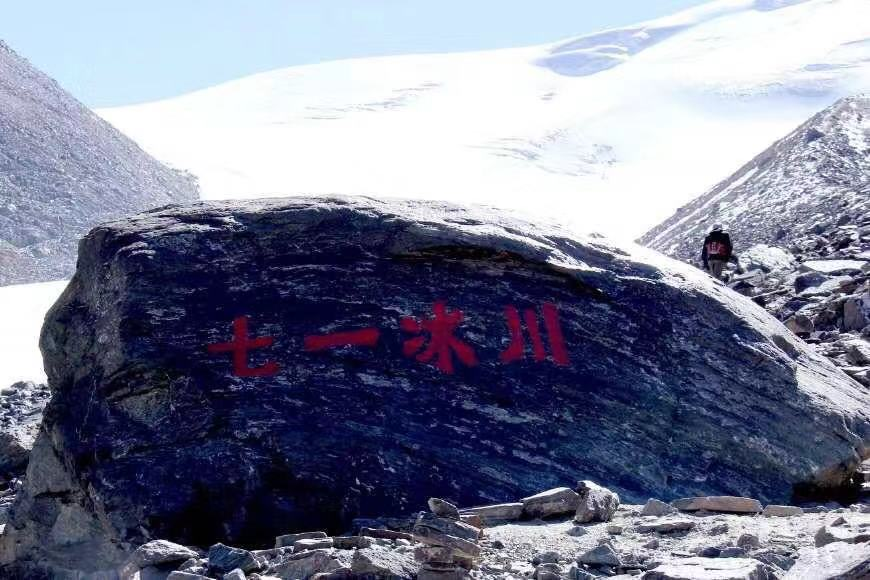
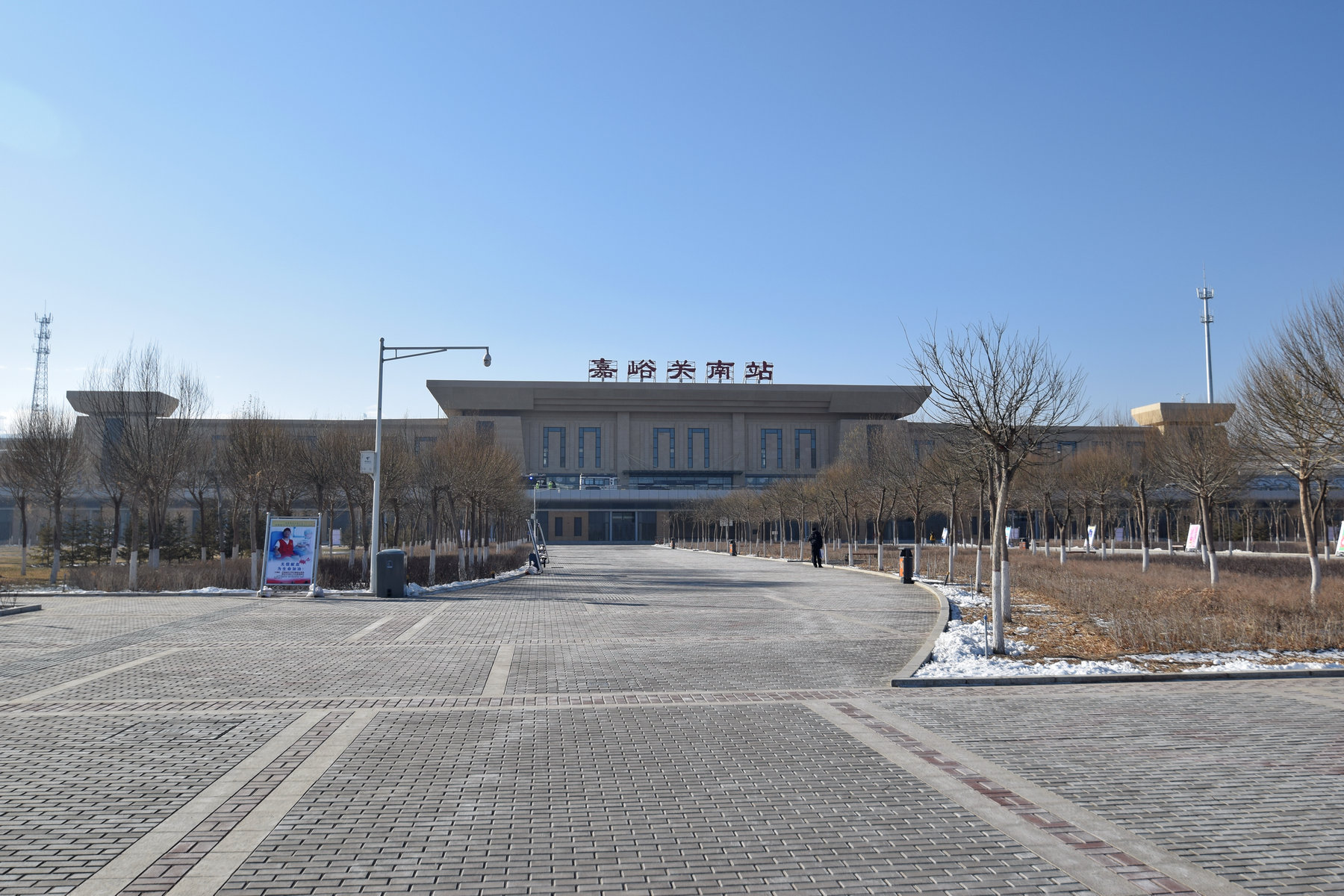
- Clockwise from top: Jiayu Pass with the city visible in the background, the July 1 Glacier, Jiayuguan South station on the Lanzhou–Xinjiang high-speed railway, statue commemorating Jiayuguan as China's "Top Tourist City", and the Taolai River.

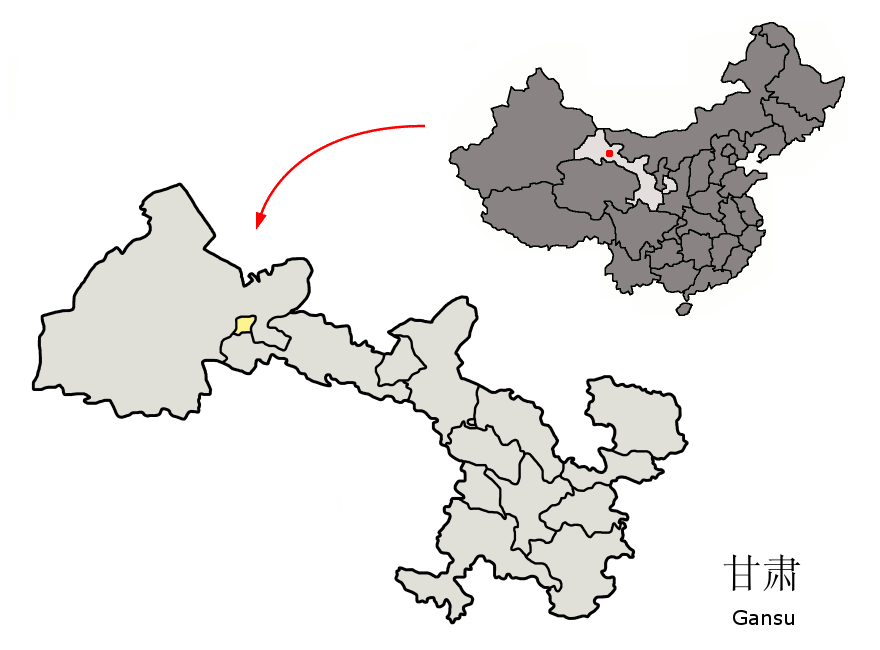
- Location of Jiayuguan City jurisdiction in Gansu

- Location of the city center in Gansu Jiayuguan City (China)
- Coordinates (Jiayuguan municipal government): 39°46′24″N 98°17′18″E
- Country: China
- Province: Gansu
- Municipal seat: Gangcheng Subdistrict

Area
  - Prefecture-level city: 1,224 km^{2} (473 sq mi)
  - Urban: 1,224 km^{2} (473 sq mi)
  - Metro: 4,577 km^{2} (1,767 sq mi)

Population (2020 census)
  - Prefecture-level city: 312,663
  - Density: 255.4/km^{2} (661.6/sq mi)
  - Urban: 312,663
  - Urban density: 255.4/km^{2} (661.6/sq mi)
  - Metro: 768,274
  - Metro density: 167.9/km^{2} (434.7/sq mi)

GDP
  - Prefecture-level city: CN¥ 19.0 billion US$ 3.1 billion
  - Per capita: CN¥ 78,336; US$ 12,577
- Time zone: UTC+8 (CST)
- Postal code: 735100
- ISO 3166 code: CN-GS-02
- Website: www.jyg.gansu.gov.cn

Jiayuguan City (simplified Chinese: 嘉峪关市; traditional Chinese: 嘉峪關市; pinyin: Jiāyùguān Shì) is a prefecture-level city in northwestern Gansu province, with a population of 312,663 as of the 2020 census. Compared with the 231,853 people in the sixth national census in 2010, there was an increase of 80,810 people, with an average annual increase of 3.04%. Its built-up (or metro) area was home to 768,274 inhabitants made of Jiayuguan City and Suzhou urban district of Jiuquan City now being conurbated. It is named after the nearby Jiayu Pass, the largest and most intact pass of the Great Wall of China.

Jiayuguan is a major industrial city. In 1958, Jiuquan Iron and Steel Works established in Jiuquan, Gansu. In 1965, parts of Jiuquan County and Sunan Yugur Autonomous County (Including Jiuquan Iron and Steel Works) were marked out to establish the County-level Jiayuguan City, which is under the direct jurisdiction of Gansu Government. Following Jiuquan Iron and Steel Works, the largest Iron and Steel Works in Gansu, was assigned to Jiayuguan City, mining and mineral processing are the primary industries of the city. In 1971, Jiayuguan City was changed to a prefecture-level city. By area, it is by far the smallest prefecture-level division of Gansu. It is also one of the four prefecture-level cities which has no districts.

The fortress at Jiayuguan is situated at the end of the portion of the Great Wall of China which was built by the Ming Dynasty, in the 14th century.

== Great Wall Monitoring Platform ==
The Jiayuguan Pass, a part of the Great Wall of China World Heritage Site, is protected by a "Cultural Relics Monitoring and Early Warning Platform." This system uses sensors and drones to monitor structural stability, environmental factors, and visitor impact on the ancient fortifications in real-time.

== Administration ==
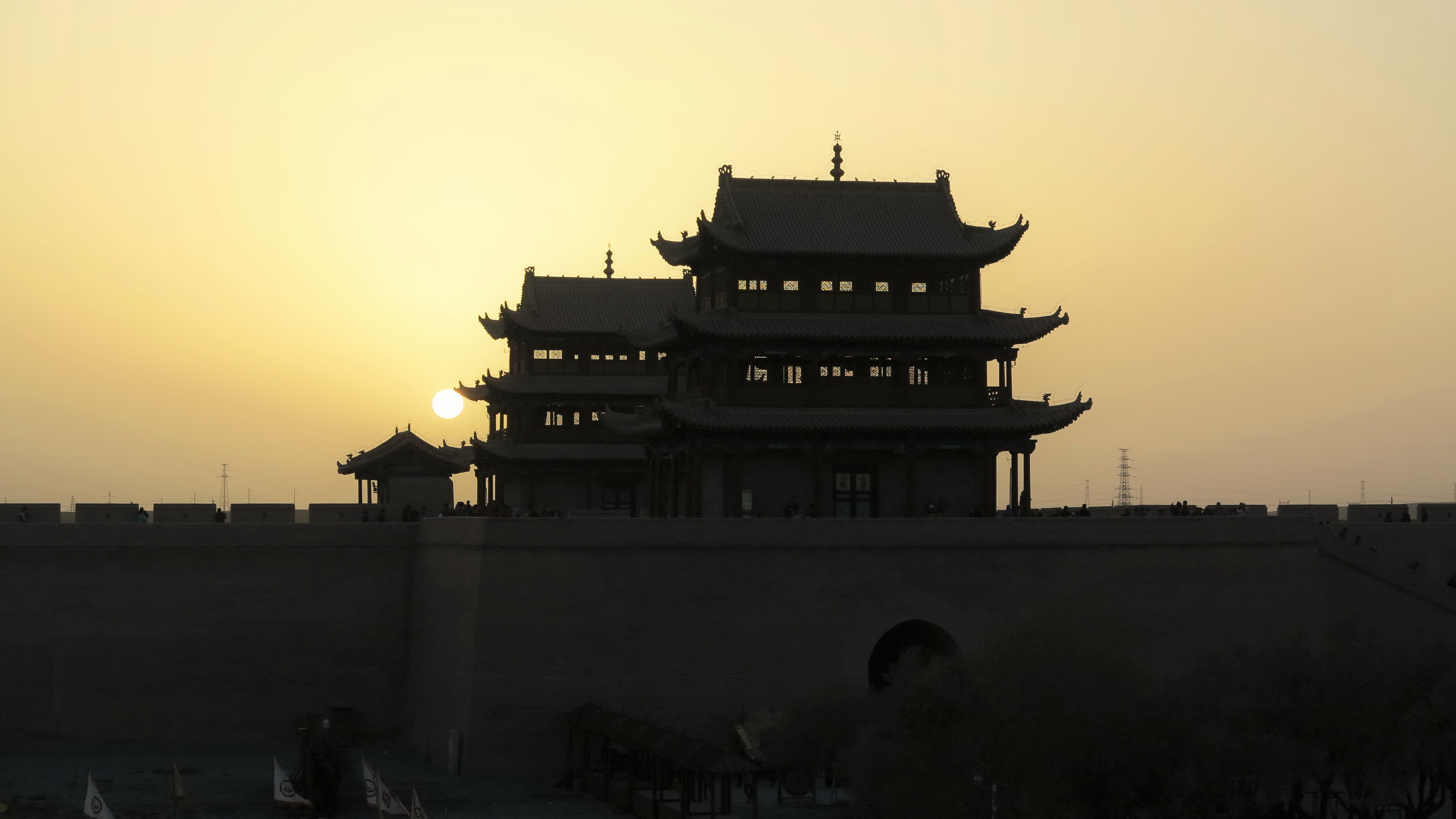
Jiayuguan Fort at sunset

As of 2019, Jiayuguan City is underdivided 3 towns.

Towns

- Xincheng (新城镇)
- Yuquan (峪泉镇)
- Wenshu (文殊镇)

Jiayuguan is divided into 2 subdistricts and 3 towns.

Map
Name	Chinese	Hanyu Pinyin
Xiongguan Subdistrict	雄关街道	Xióngguān Jiēdào
Gangcheng Subdistrict	长城街道	Gāngchéng Jiēdào
Xincheng town	新城镇	Xīnchéng Zhèn
Yuquan town	峪泉镇	Yùquán Zhèn
Wenshu town	文殊镇	Wénshū Zhèn

== Transport ==
Jiayuguan is served by China National Highway 312, and the Lanzhou-Xinjiang and Jiayuguan-Ceke Railways. A 69-km-long branch railway, the Jiajing Railway (嘉镜铁路), runs from Jiayuguan to Jingtieshan (镜铁山矿区). High speed passenger rail stops at Jiayuguan South railway station.

Jiayuguan is served by the Jiayuguan Jiuquan Airport that offers direct air services to Xi'an on Shanghai Airlines and Beijing on Air China.

== Climate ==
Jiayuguan has a cool arid climate (Köppen BWk), in common with most of northwestern China. Summers feature pleasant mornings and very warm afternoons, whilst winters are freezing to frigid though with essentially no snow due to the extreme aridity produced by the Siberian High.

Climate data for Jiayuguan
Month	Jan	Feb	Mar	Apr	May	Jun	Jul	Aug	Sep	Oct	Nov	Dec	Year
Mean daily maximum °C (°F)	−2 (28)	3 (38)	11 (51)	17 (63)	22 (72)	27 (81)	29 (84)	28 (83)	23 (73)	16 (60)	6 (42)	0 (32)	15 (59)
Mean daily minimum °C (°F)	−16 (3)	−12 (11)	−4 (25)	2 (36)	8 (46)	13 (55)	15 (59)	14 (58)	8 (47)	1 (33)	−7 (20)	−13 (9)	1 (34)
Average precipitation cm (inches)	0 (0)	0.25 (0.1)	0.51 (0.2)	0.51 (0.2)	0.76 (0.3)	1.0 (0.4)	1.8 (0.7)	2.8 (1.1)	0.51 (0.2)	0 (0)	0.25 (0.1)	0.25 (0.1)	8.64 (3.4)
Source: Weatherbase

== Demographics ==
According to the Seventh National Census in 2020, the city's Permanent Population (hukou) was 185,231. Compared with 231,853 in the Sixth National Census in 2010, the number has increased by 80,810, or an average annual increase of 3.04 percent. The male population was 162,360, accounting for 51.93%; The female population was 150,303 (48.07%). The sex ratio of the resident population (100 females, male to female ratio) decreased to 108.02 from 114.59 in the Sixth National Census in 2010.

== See also ==
- Jiayuguan Solar Park
