= Yuquan, Mianzhu =

Yuquan 玉泉镇
- Town
- Location in Sichuan
- Coordinates: 31°15′19″N 104°8′1″E
- Country: People's Republic of China
- Province: Sichuan
- Prefecture-level city: Deyang
- County-level city: Mianzhu
- Time zone: UTC+8 (China Standard)

Yuquan (Chinese: 玉泉; pinyin: Yùquán) is a town in Mianzhu, Sichuan province, China. As of 2020, it administers the following five villages:

- Yujiang Village (玉江村)
- Longxing Village (龙兴村)
- Yongning Village (永宁村)
- Guihua Village (桂花村)
- Yongquan Village (涌泉村)
