= Hami (disambiguation) =

Hami is a prefecture-level city in Xinjiang, China.

Hami may also refer to:

== Biology ==
- Hami, also called hooks, a type of archaeal pilus

== Geographic Designations ==
- Yizhou District, Hami, formerly Hami county-level city, now the central district of Hami
- Hami Desert, Xinjiang, China
- Hami, Iran, a village in South Khorasan Province
- Hami, Yemen
- Hami, Kagoshima, Japan

== Plants ==
- Hami melon, a type of muskmelon grown in Hami

== See also ==
- Kumul (disambiguation)
- Haami, a 2018 Indian film
  - Haami 2, its 2022 sequel
