= Hami railway station =

Railway station in Hami, China

Coordinates: 42.84836°N 93.50450°E

Hami 哈密
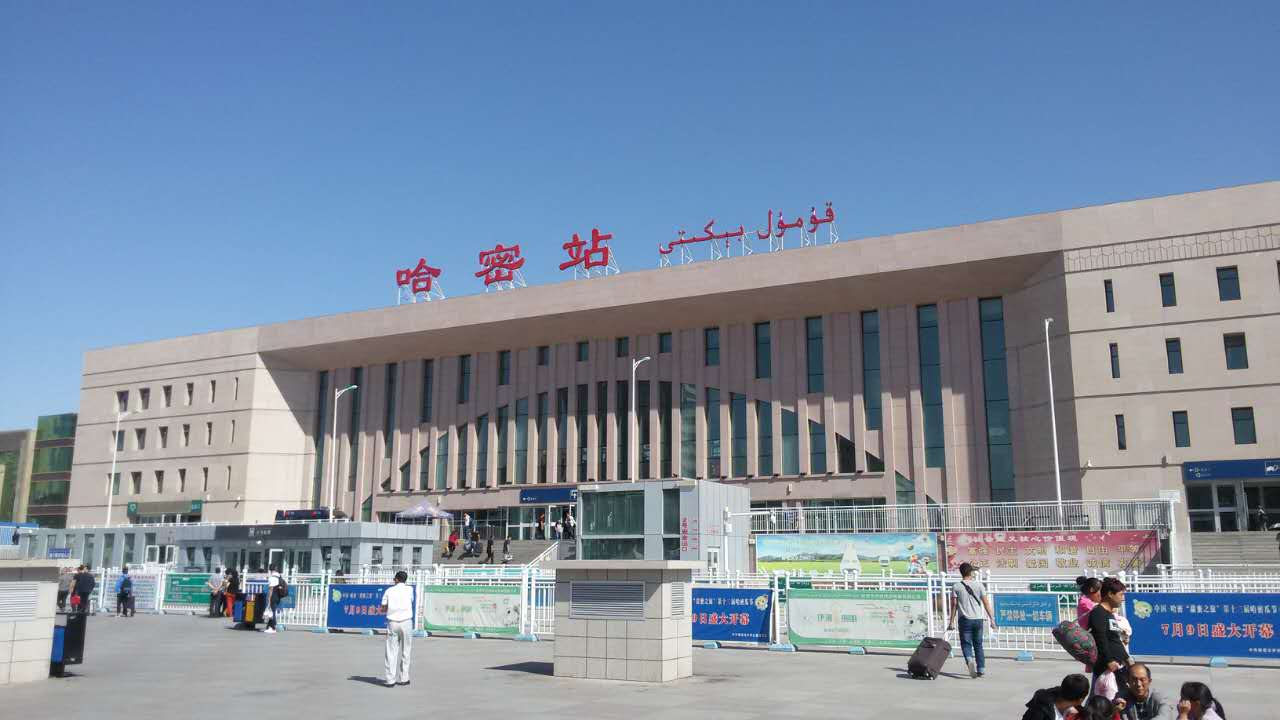

General information
- Location: Yizhou District, Hami, Xinjiang; China
- Operator: China Railway Ürümqi Group
- Lines: Lanzhou–Xinjiang HSR; Lanzhou–Xinjiang railway

History
- Opened: 2014

Services
Preceding station	China Railway	Following station
Hongguang towards Lanzhou	Lanzhou–Xinjiang railway	Huoshiquan towards Ürümqi South
Location

Hami railway station is a station servicing high-speed and conventional rail in Yizhou District, Hami, Xinjiang, China.

The station is along the line of the Lanzhou–Xinjiang high-speed railway connecting Hami to the rest of Xinjiang to the west and to Eastern Chinese cities. Conventional rail services continue to serve the station using the Lanzhou–Xinjiang railway.

Near the end of construction on August 21, 2014, a fire started around 17:00 and engulfed 600 square meters of the stations before firefighters extinguished the fire after a 30-minute battle. The station was reopened on November 19, 2014.
