= Kumul (disambiguation) =

Kumul is the Uyghur name of Hami, a city in Xinjiang, China.

Kumul may also refer to:

- Kumul Khanate, a semi-autonomous vassal state within the Qing Empire and the Republic of China
- Kumul (bird), Paradisaea raggiana, the national bird of Papua New Guinea
- Morobe United F.C., called "the Blue Kumuls" or "Morobe Kumuls", a Papua New Guinea association football club
- The Kumuls, nickname for the Papua New Guinea national rugby league team

== See also ==
- Hami (disambiguation)
