= Hongguang railway station =

Railway station in Hami, China

Hongguang 红光

General information
- Location: Yizhou District, Hami, Xinjiang; China
- Operator: China Railway Ürümqi Group
- Line: Lanzhou–Xinjiang Railway

History
- Opened: 1959
Location

The Hongguang railway station (Chinese: 红光站; pinyin: Hóngguāng Zhàn) is a railway station of Lanzhou–Xinjiang Railway. The station located in Yizhou District, Hami, Xinjiang, China.

== See also ==
- Lanzhou–Xinjiang Railway
