= 伊州 =

伊州 may refer to:

- Iga Province, abbreviated name was Ishū (伊州), province of Japan located in what is today part of western Mie Prefecture
- Yizhou District, Hami, district of Hami, Xinjiang
