= Lanzhou–Xinjiang railway =

Railway line in China

Lanzhou−Xinjiang railway 兰新铁路
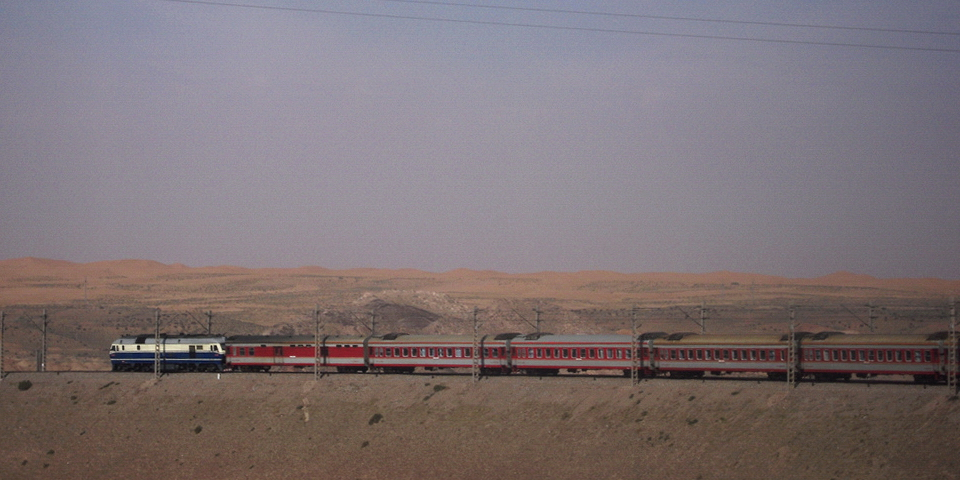
- A train running through the deserts of Xinjiang

Overview
- Status: Operational
- Locale: China: Gansu; Xinjiang
- Termini: Lanzhou railway station; Ürümqi South railway station

Service
- Type: Heavy rail
- System: China Railway
- Operator(s): China Railway Lanzhou Group; China Railway Ürümqi Group

History
- Opened: 1966

Technical
- Line length: 1,904 km (1,183 mi)
- Number of tracks: 2 (Double-track railway)
- Track gauge: 1,435 mm (4 ft 8 1/2 in) standard gauge
- Electrification: 25 kV 50 Hz AC overhead catenary
- Operating speed: 160km/h

The Lanzhou−Xinjiang railway or Lanxin railway (simplified Chinese: 兰新铁路; traditional Chinese: 蘭新鐵路; pinyin: Lánxīn Tiělù), is the longest railway in Northwestern China. It runs 1904 kilometres (1,183 miles) from Lanzhou, Gansu, through the Hexi Corridor, to Ürümqi, in Xinjiang. It was Xinjiang's only rail link with the rest of China until the opening of the Lanzhou–Xinjiang high-speed railway in December 2014. The railway follows the path of the ancient Silk Road.

== History ==
The Lanzhou–Xinjiang railway, often abbreviated as the Lanxin line, is the longest railway built by the People's Republic of China. It was built by the China Railway Engineering Corporation. Construction of the initial stage (to Ürümqi) started in 1952, completed in 1962 and opened in 1966. The extension to the Kazakhstan border was built in the late 1980s and the linkup with the Kazakhstan Railroads was achieved on September 12, 1990. After the completion of the 20 km Wushaoling Tunnel in 2006, the railway from Lanzhou to Ürümqi is all double-tracked.

== Route ==
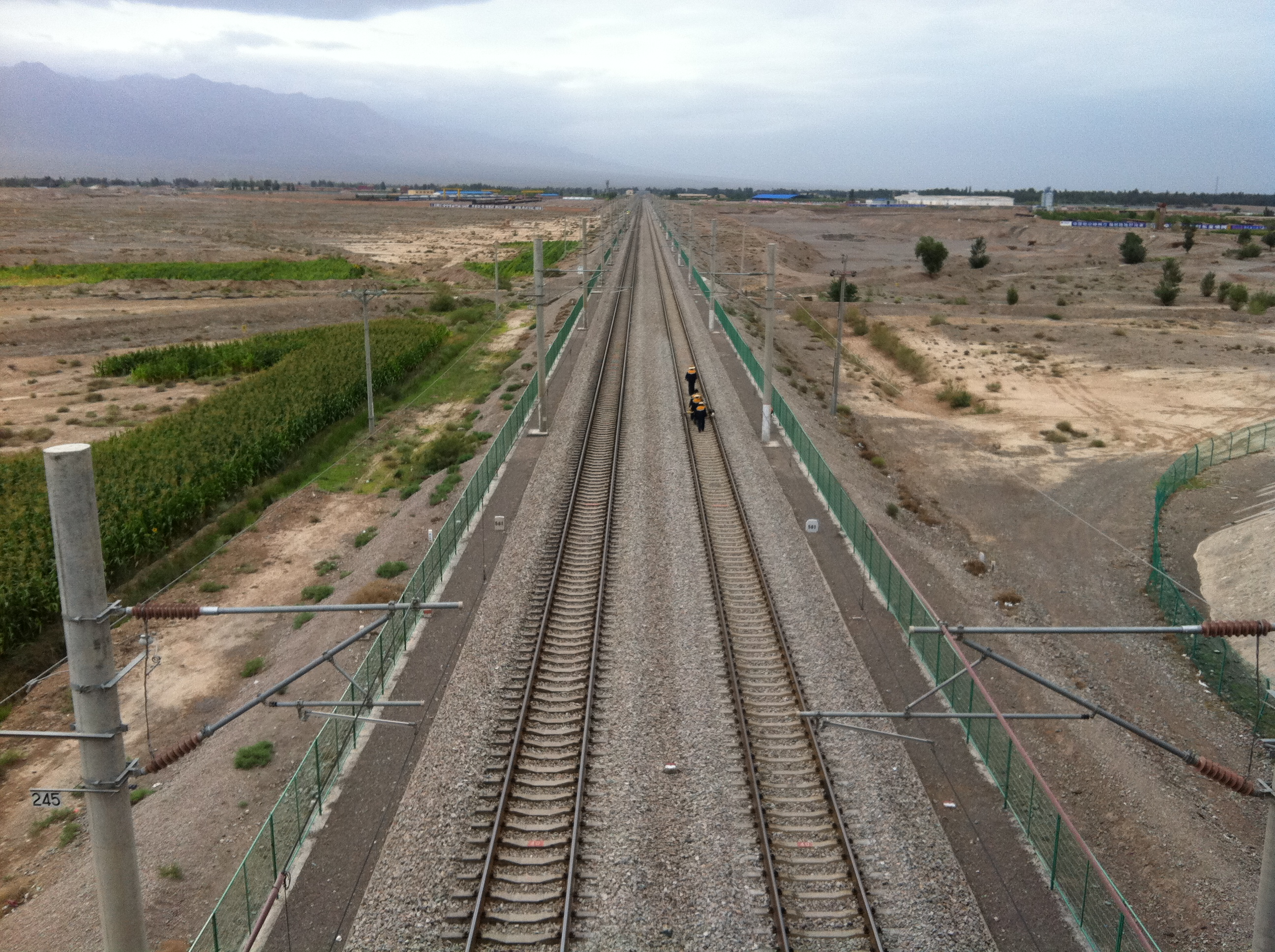
Lanxin railway in Linze County, Gansu

The Lanxin railway's eastern terminus is Lanzhou railway station. Lanzhou is a railway junction city in eastern Gansu Province, where the Lanzhou–Qinghai, Baotou–Lanzhou and Longhai Railways converge. From Lanzhou, the line heads west, across the Yellow River, into the Hexi Corridor, where it passes through Gansu cities Wuwei, Jinchang, Zhangye, Jiuquan and Jiayuguan, en route to Xinjiang. Once in Xinjiang, the railway passes through Hami, Shanshan, Turpan and Dabancheng, before reaching Ürümqi in central Xinjiang.

The Lanxin railway is sometimes categorized to include the Northern Xinjiang railway, which continues west from Ürümqi to Alashankou, on the Kazakhstan border. The distance from Alashankou to Lanzhou is 2360 km. Beyond Alashankou, the railway links up with the Turkestan–Siberia railway of Central Asia and eventually reaches Rotterdam.

=== Station list ===
Station	Chinese	Distance (km)	Location	
Lanzhou _{Longhai railway Baotou–Lanzhou railway}	兰州	0	Lanzhou	Gansu
Lanzhou West	兰州西		Lanzhou	Gansu
Stations in between 陈官营 - 西固城 - 坡底下 - 河口南 Lanzhou–Qinghai railway 大路 - 新屯川 - 华家山 - 龙泉寺 - 马家坪 永登 - 中堡 - 屯沟湾 - 富强堡 - 天祝 石门河 - 安家河 - 打柴沟 - 深沟 - 岔西滩 金强河 - 乌鞘岭 - 青河 - 安远镇 - 沙沟台 龙沟 - 柳家台 - 十八里堡 - 古浪 - 小桥堡 双塔 - 黄羊镇 - 头坝河
Wuwei South _{Ganwu railway}	武威南	290	Wuwei	Gansu
Wuwei	武威	303	Wuwei	Gansu
Stations in between 北河 - 槐安 - 截河坝 - 青山堡 - 宗家庄
Jinchang	金昌	377	Jinchang	Gansu
Stations in between 东大山 - 玉石 - 芨岭 - 尖山 - 大青田口 马莲井 - 东明 - 山丹 - 东乐 - 西屯 - 太平堡
Zhangye	张掖	547	Zhangye	Gansu
Stations in between 乌江堡 - 平原堡 - 临泽 - 新华庄 - 高台 梧桐泉 - 许三湾 - 屯升
Qingshui	清水	684	Jiuquan	Gansu
Stations in between 丰乐滩 - 上河清 - 金佛寺 - 红山堡
Jiuquan Jiuquan–Ejin railway	酒泉	748	Jiuquan	Gansu
Jiayuguan _{Jiayuguan–Jingtieshan Railway; Jiayuguan–Ceke Railway}	嘉峪关	770	Jiayuguan	Gansu
Stations in between 大草滩 - 黑山湖 - 玉门 - 新民堡 - 鄯马河 腰泉子 - 五华山
Diwopu	低窝铺	880	Jiuquan	Gansu
Stations in between 玉门镇 - 军垦
Shulehe	疏勒河	925	Jiuquan	Gansu
Stations in between 疏勒河 - 河东 - 桥湾 - 柳沟 Dunhuang Railway - 安北 金泉 - 石板墩 - 峡东 - 峡口
Liuyuan	柳园	1067	Jiuquan	Gansu
Xiaoquan East	小泉东	1083	Jiuquan	Gansu
Daquan	大泉	1104	Jiuquan	Gansu
Zhaodong	照东	1126	Jiuquan	Gansu
Hongliuhe	红柳河	1153	Jiuquan	Gansu
Tianhu	天湖	1176	Hami	Xinjiang
Weiya	尾亚	1197	Hami	Xinjiang
Sitian	思甜	1219	Hami	Xinjiang
Shankou	山口	1242	Hami	Xinjiang
Yandun	烟墩	1262	Hami	Xinjiang
Yanquan	盐泉	1287	Hami	Xinjiang
Hongqicun	红旗村	1301	Hami	Xinjiang
Hongguang	红光	1328	Hami	Xinjiang
Hami	哈密	1339	Hami	Xinjiang
Huoshiquan	火石泉	1352	Hami	Xinjiang
Toubao	头堡	1368	Hami	Xinjiang
Erbao	二堡	1384	Hami	Xinjiang
Liushuquan	柳树泉	1398	Hami	Xinjiang
Yaziquan	雅子泉	1426	Hami	Xinjiang
Liaodun	了墩	1455	Hami	Xinjiang
Shisanjianfang	十三间房	1496	Hami	Xinjiang
Station in between 大步
Shanshan	鄯善	1609	Turpan	Xinjiang
Qiquanhu	七泉湖	1696	Turpan	Xinjiang
Meiyaogou	煤窑沟	1708	Turpan	Xinjiang
Station in between 夏普吐勒
Turpan _{Southern Xinjiang Railway}	吐鲁番	1749	Turpan	Xinjiang
Station in between 天山
Dabanqiao	达板桥	1802	Ürümqi	Xinjiang
Yanhu	盐湖	1827	Ürümqi	Xinjiang
Chaiwobao	柴窝堡	1841	Ürümqi	Xinjiang
Sangezhuang	三葛庄	1859	Ürümqi	Xinjiang
Station in between 芨芨槽子
Wulabo	乌拉泊	1883	Ürümqi	Xinjiang
Ürümqi South _{Northern Xinjiang Railway; Second Ürümqi–Jinghe Railway}	乌鲁木齐南	1892	Ürümqi	Xinjiang

== The northern branch ==
The railway's northern branch extends 477 kilometres from Ürümqi to Alataw Pass (its westernmost point), where China's Alashankou railway station is connected to Kazakhstan's Dostyk station.

== The southern branch ==
The railway also has a southern branch, which splits off the main line near Turpan (east of Ürümqi), and runs west to Kashgar at the westernmost tip of the country. It was completed in 1999.

== Cargo ==
Xinjiang coal is one of the main types of freight shipped along the railway. In 2010, the railway is expected to ship 30 million tons of it, and by 2012, the amount is anticipated to rise to 50 million tons.

== Parallel high-speed passenger rail line ==
A new high-speed passenger rail line from Lanzhou to Xinjiang opened in December 2014. The line is mostly parallel to the existing Lanxin railway, with the exception of also serving Xining, Qinghai rather than staying entirely within Gansu province on the way to Xinjiang. The estimated cost was 143.5 billion yuan. Since the completion of this route, the older Lanxin railway is used mostly for freight.

There is also a planned railway connecting Golmud and Korla, to be an alternative railway corridor to Xinjiang.

== Gallery ==
Lanxin Railway

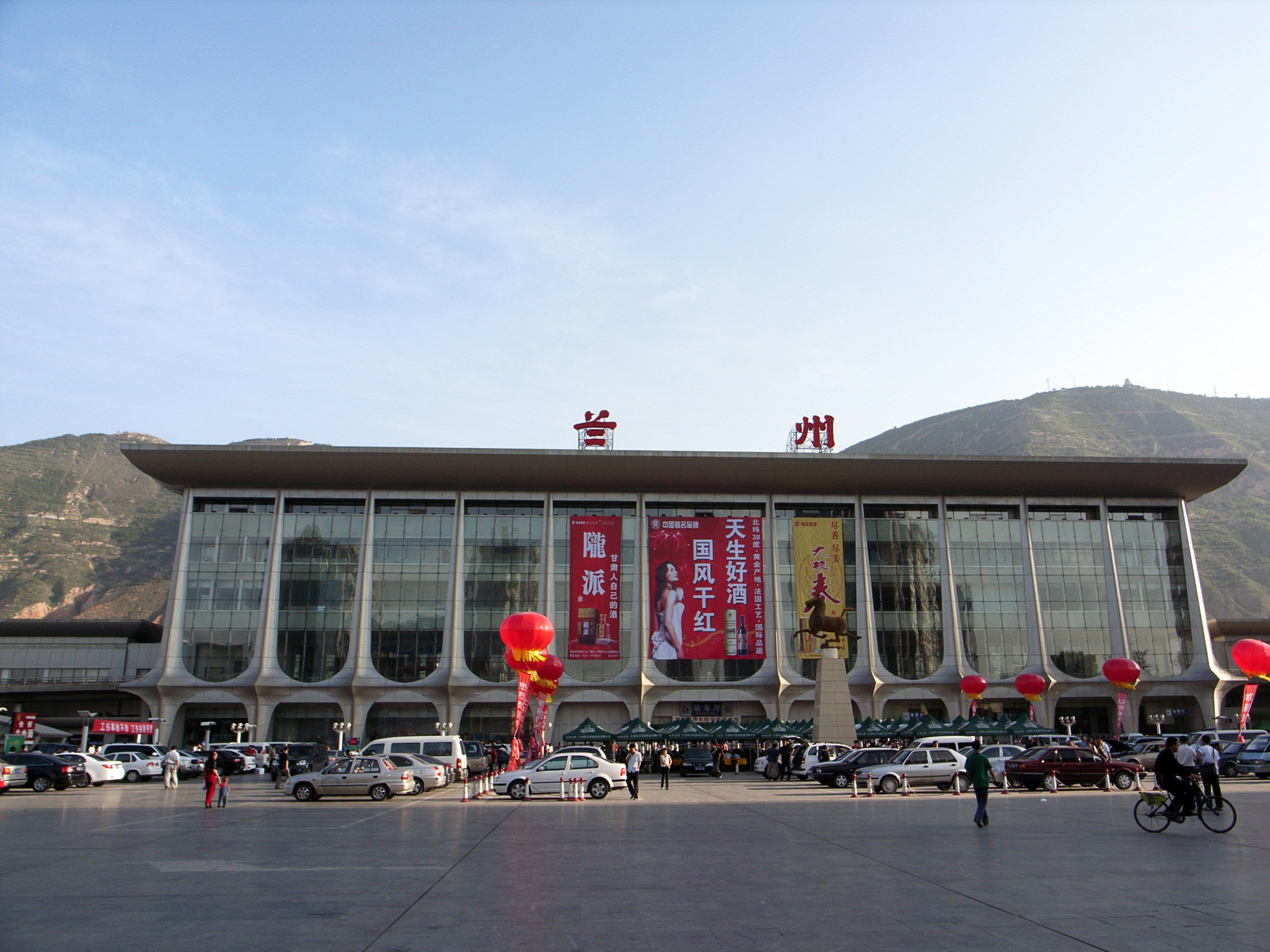
Lanzhou Station

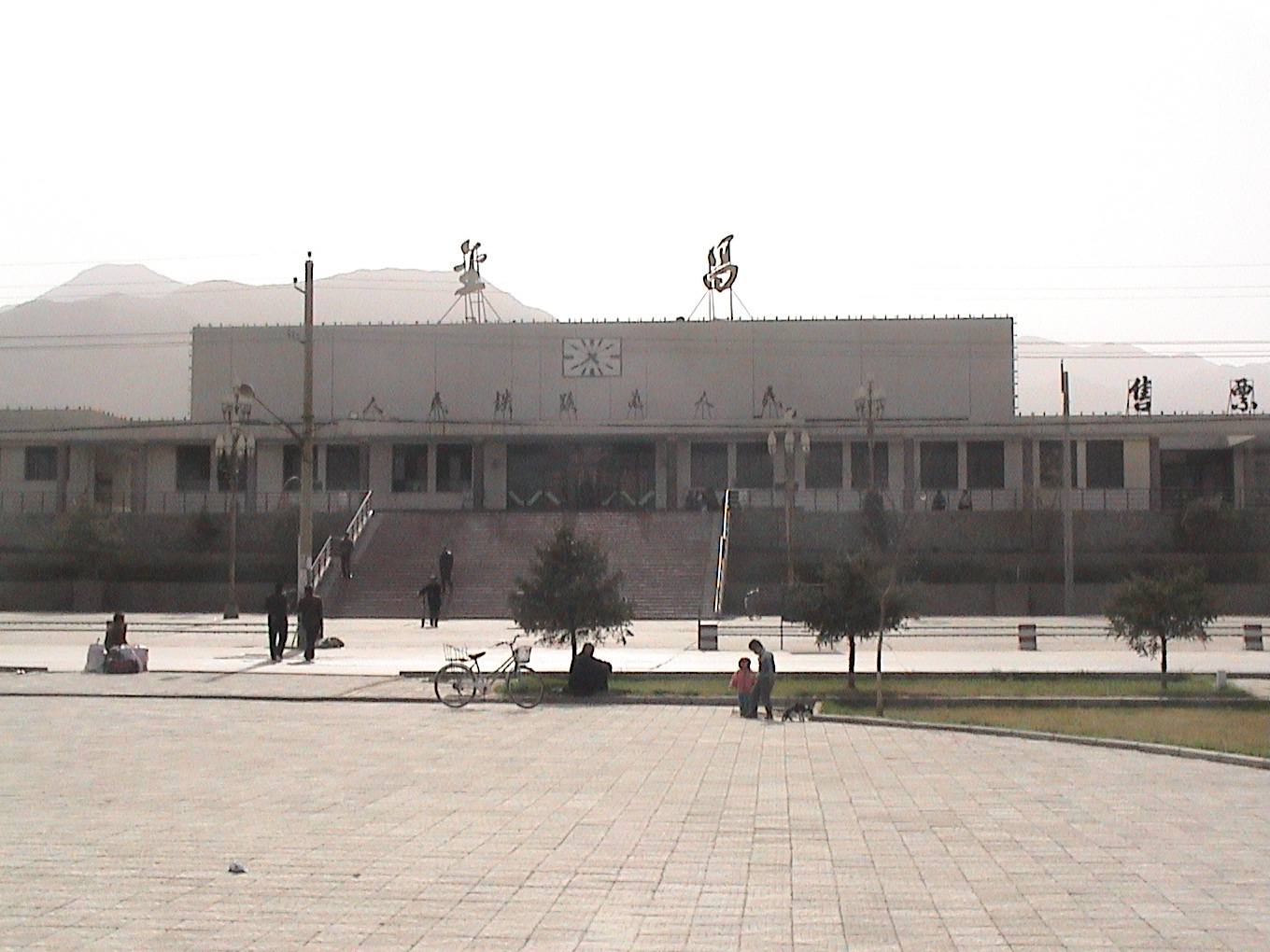
Jinchang Station

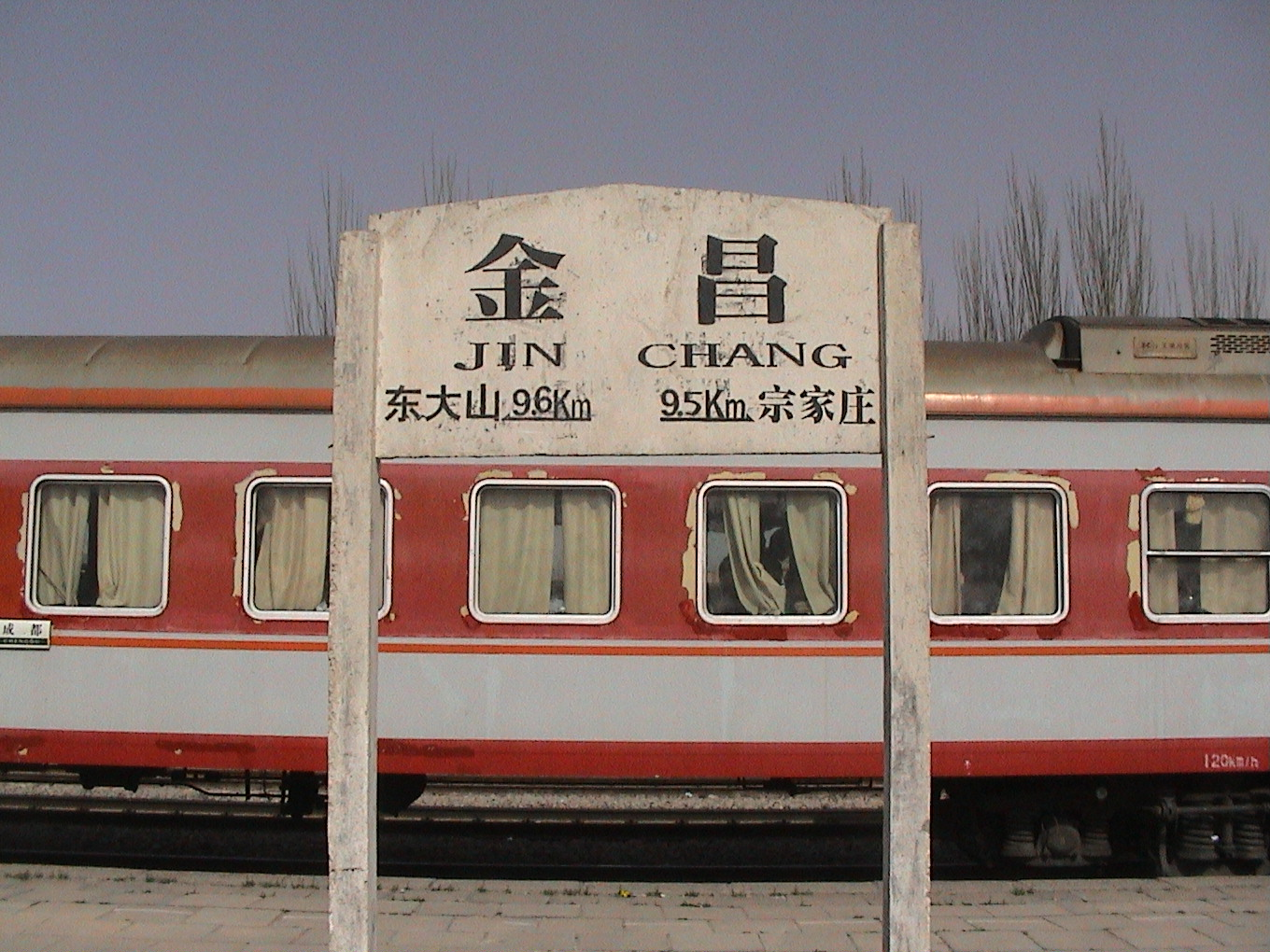
Jinchang Station platform

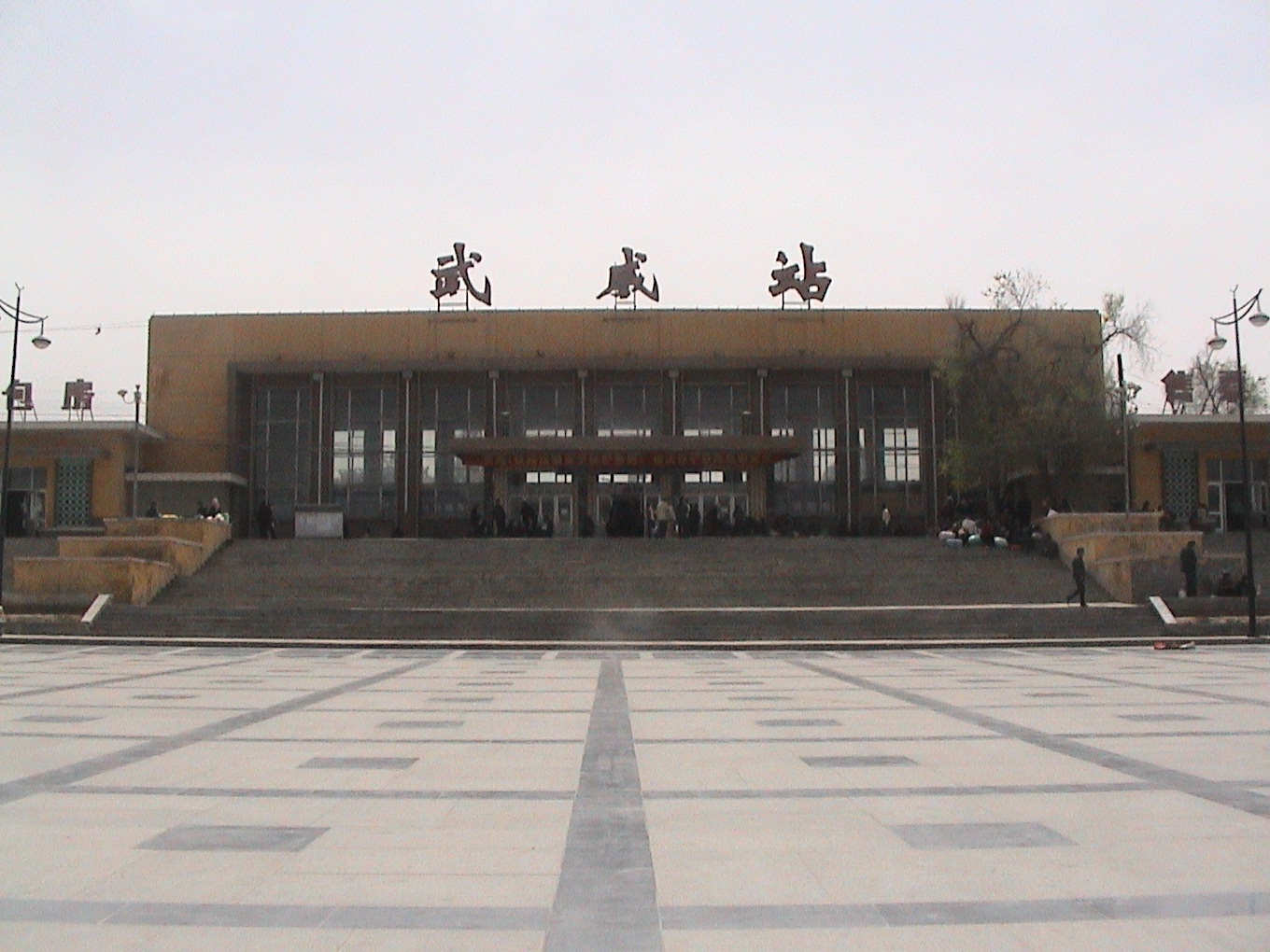
Wuwei Station

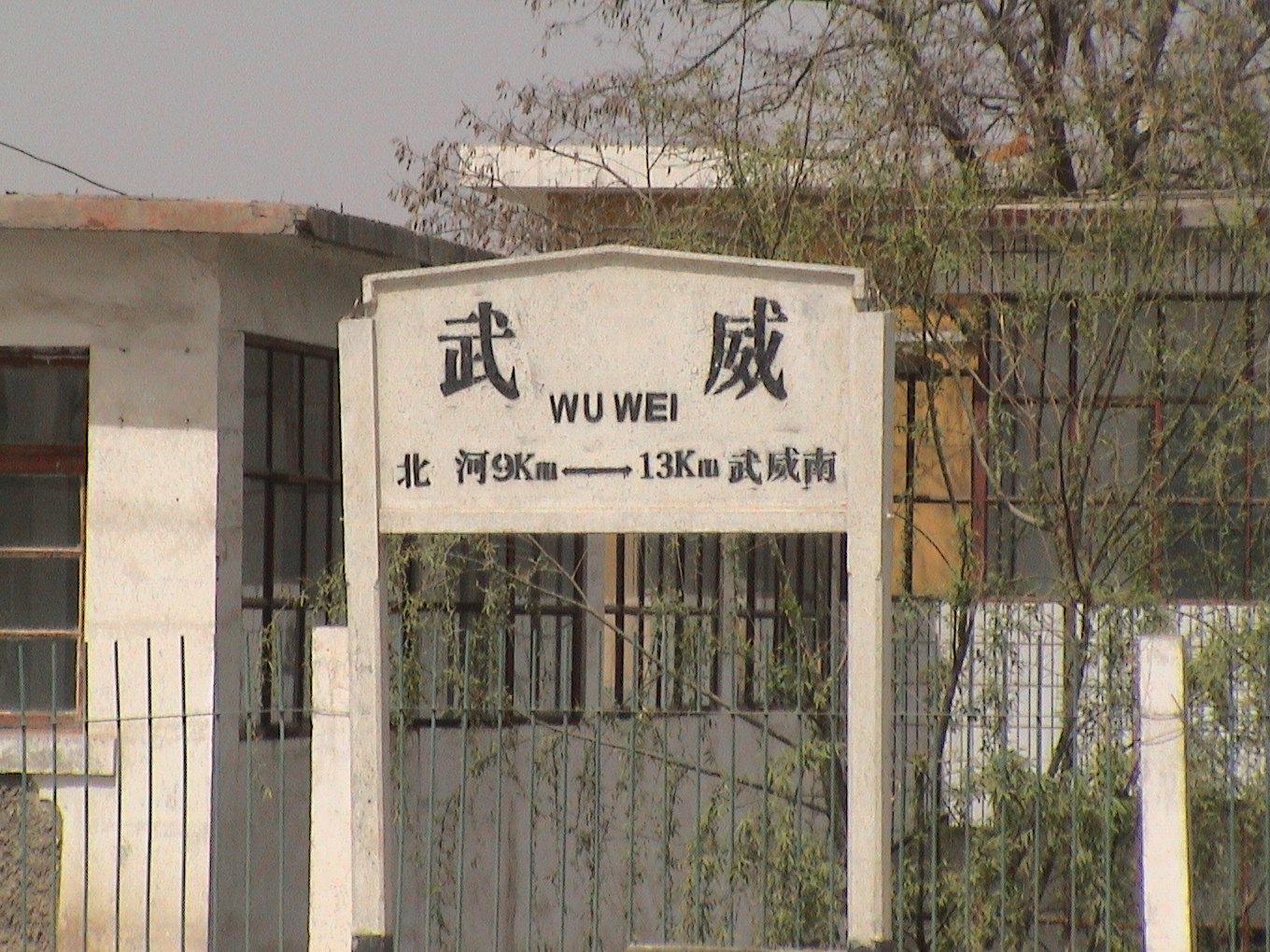
Wuwei platform

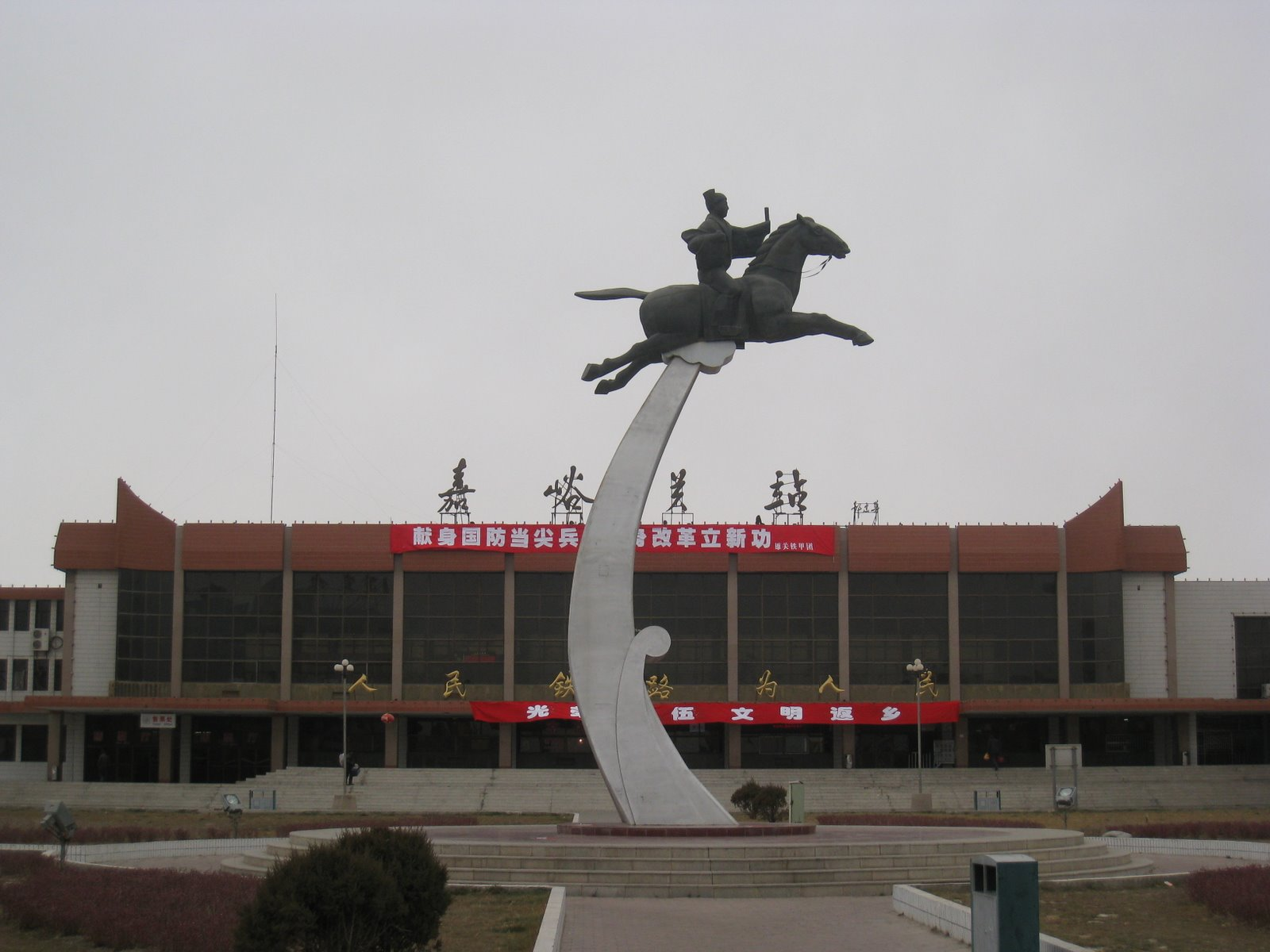
Jiayuguan Station

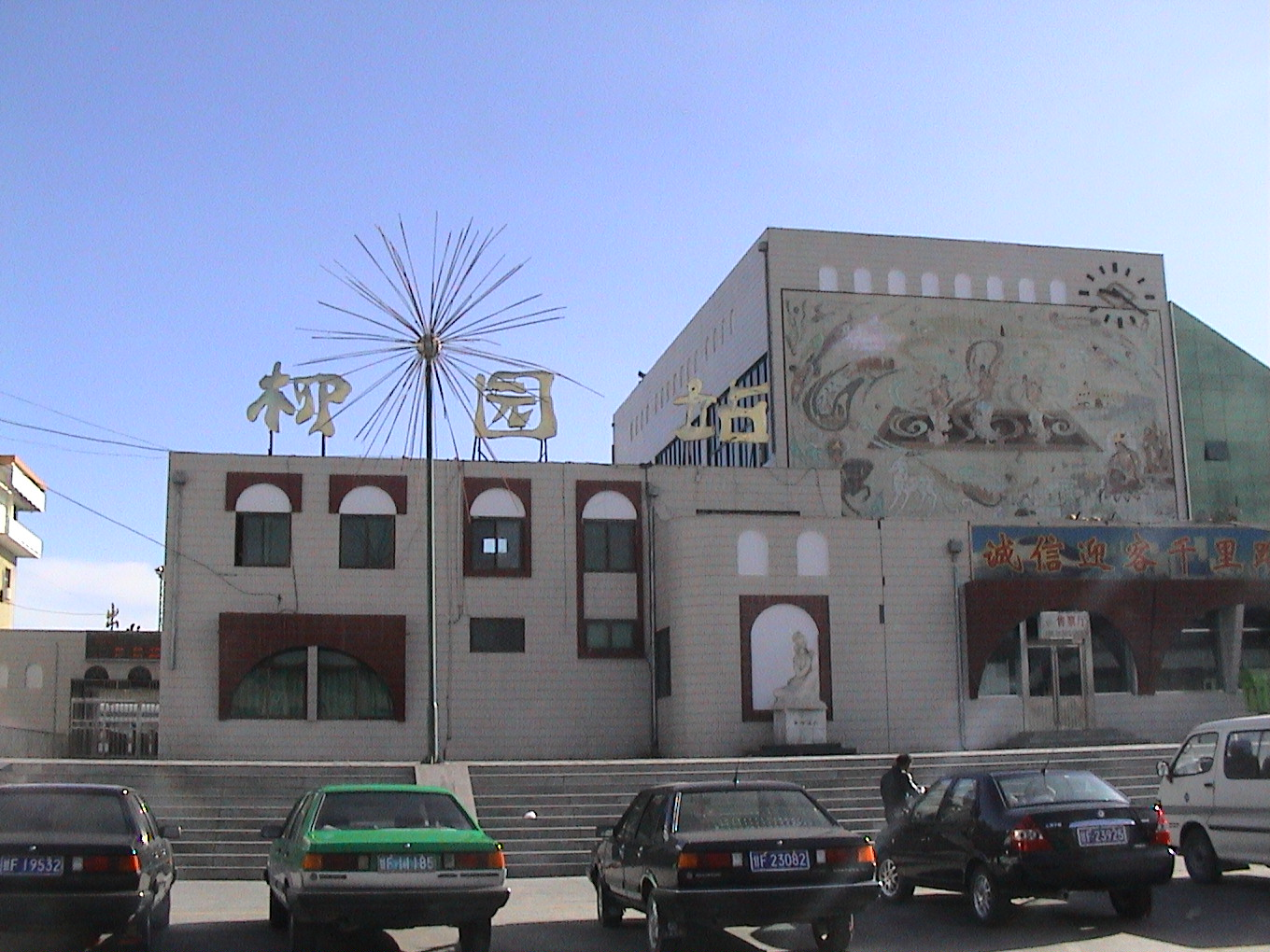
Liuyuan Station

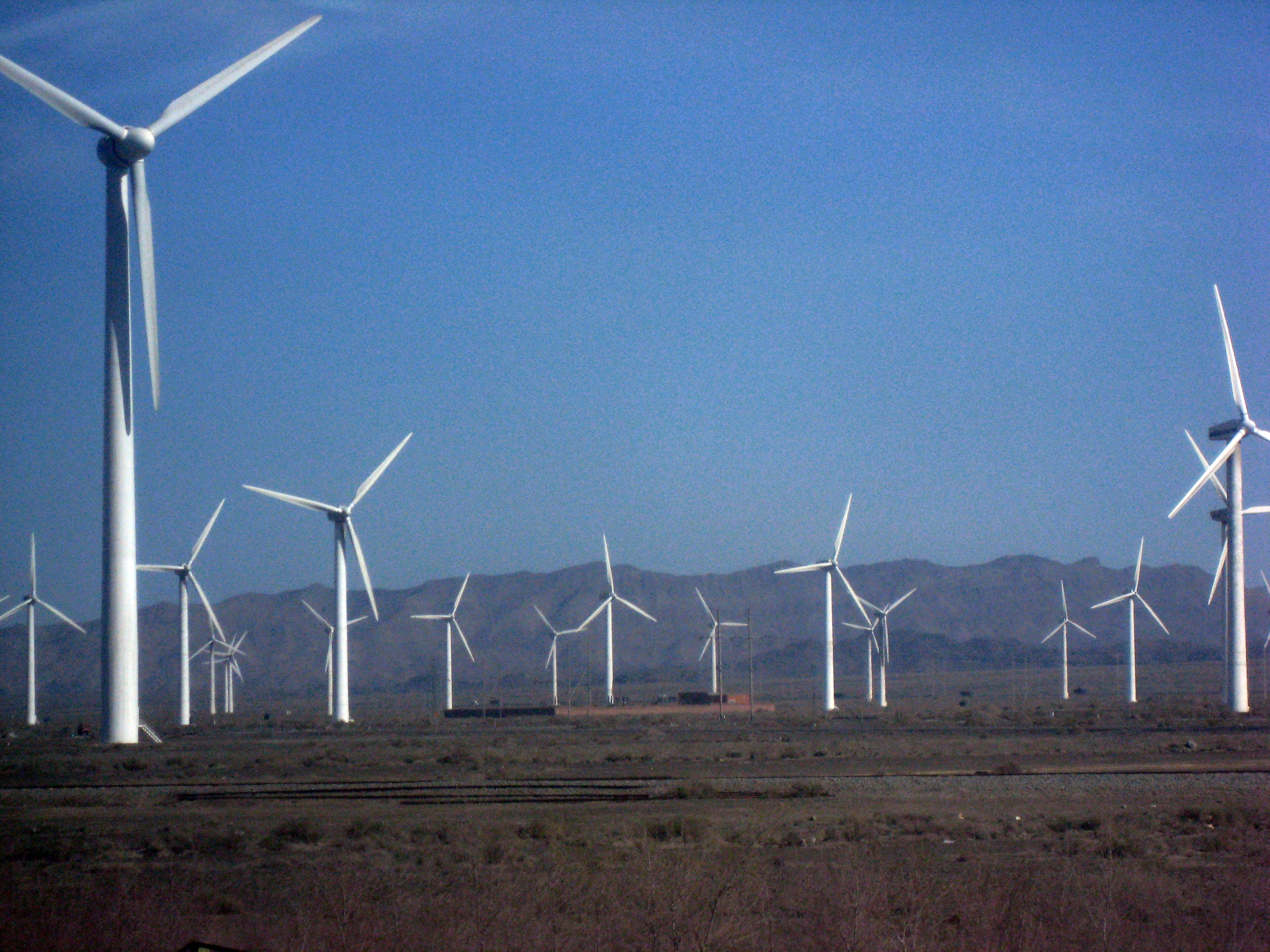
Wind farm along the railway in Xinjiang

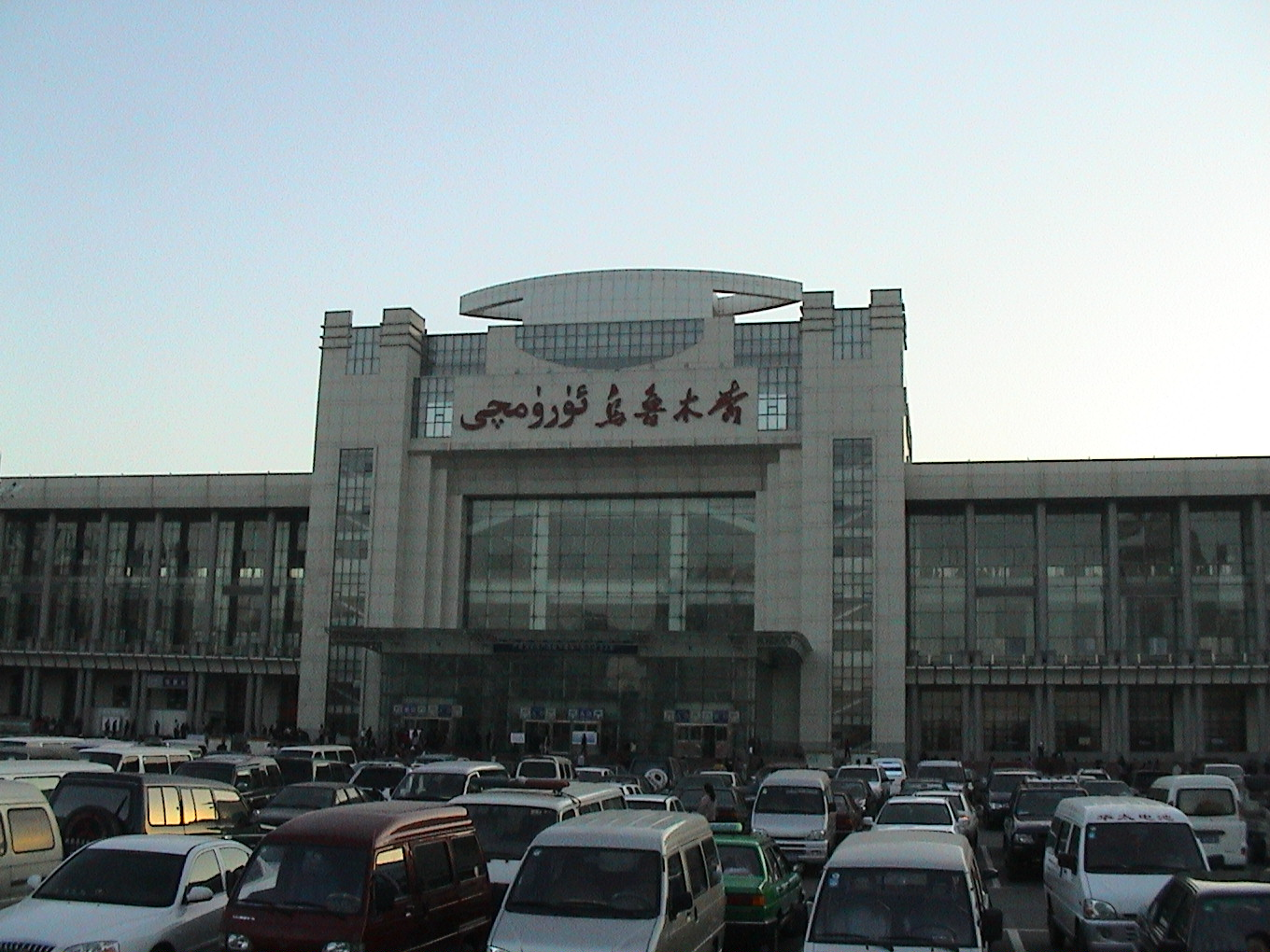
Ürümqi Station
