= Hami melon =

Melon cultivar

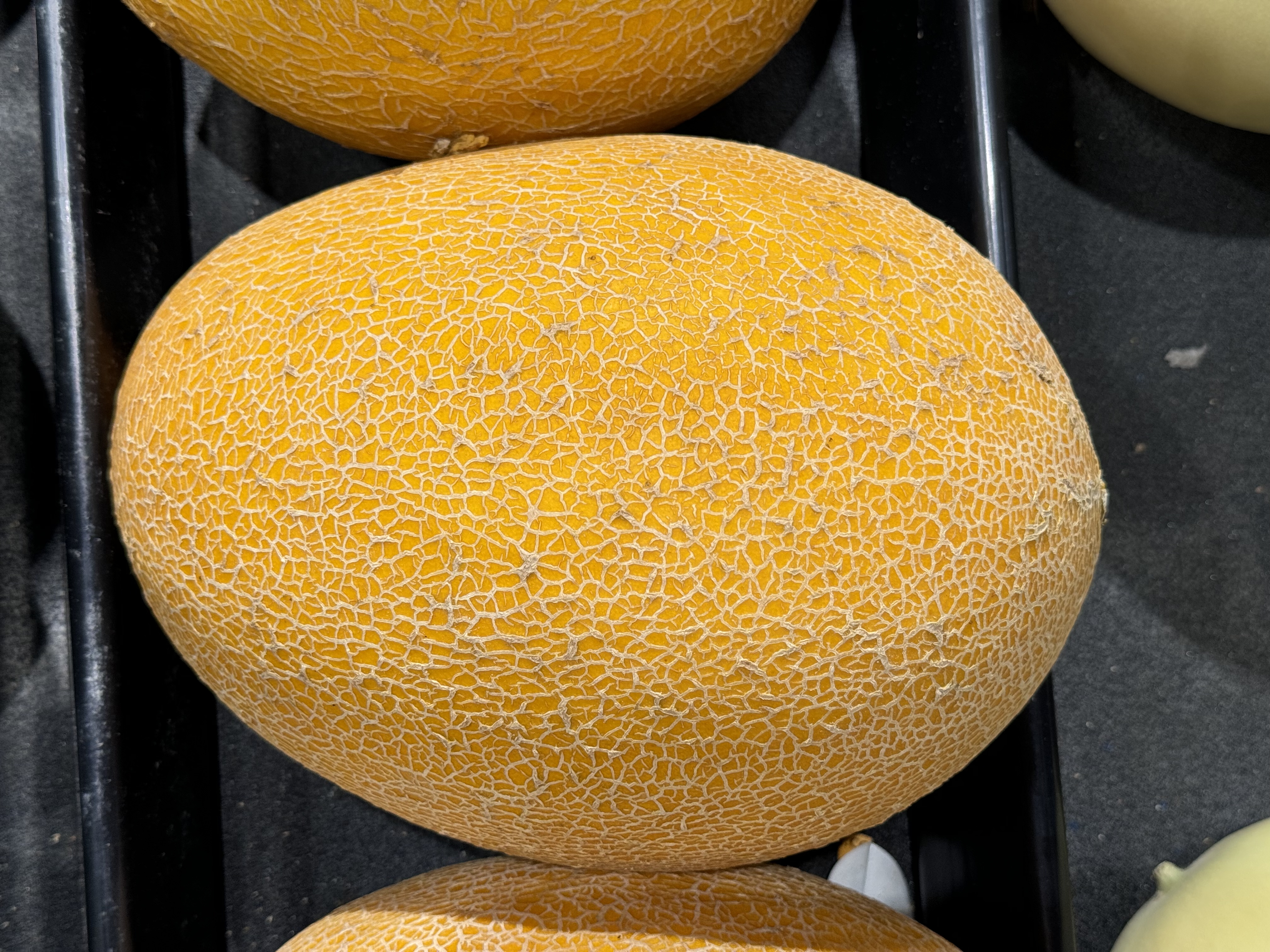
- Genus: Cucumis
- Species: C. melo
- Cultivar group: Ameri Group, Inodorus Group, Chandalak Group

Hami melon
- Traditional Chinese: 哈密瓜
Transcriptions
Standard Mandarin
- Hanyu Pinyin: Hāmì guā
- Bopomofo: ㄏㄚ ㄇㄧˋ ㄍㄨㄚ
- Wade–Giles: Ha^{1}-mi^{4} kua^{1}

Hami melon is an umbrella term for sweet melon varieties from Xinjiang, China, especially from Hami. This fruit is also referred to as the Chinese Hami melon or the snow melon. The outer color is generally white through pink or yellow through green. The inside flesh is sweet and crisp.

== Cultivation ==
The origin of the Hami melon can be traced back to the Han dynasty in China. From 58 to 76 AD, Hami melons were given to Emperor Ming of Han by officials as a rare tribute from the Western Regions and called kùhóng (Chinese: 库洪).

The Kangxi emperor wrote in a letter addressed to palace eunuchs and court ladies, "Among the local produce that the Moslems of Hami sent to me... only the sun-dried musk-melon had a really beautiful taste". He further writes that the dried melon should be rehydrated and eaten with small grapes.

Xinjiang's unique geographical environment (high altitude, large temperature difference between day and night, and sufficient sunshine) has created different varieties of Hami melon, such as the Yellow Honey Hami Melon and the Red Honey Hami Melon. More than 100 cultivated forms and hybrids of the 'Hami' melon have been grown in China.

Xinjiang has different protected areas for the cultivation of Hami melon, among which Yiwu County, Hami, has an area the length of 150 kilometers. The storage method of Hami melon at low temperatures is also unique. Among them, Gold Queen Hami Melons can be stored at 3°C for 18 days and still maintain the original taste.

== Gallery ==
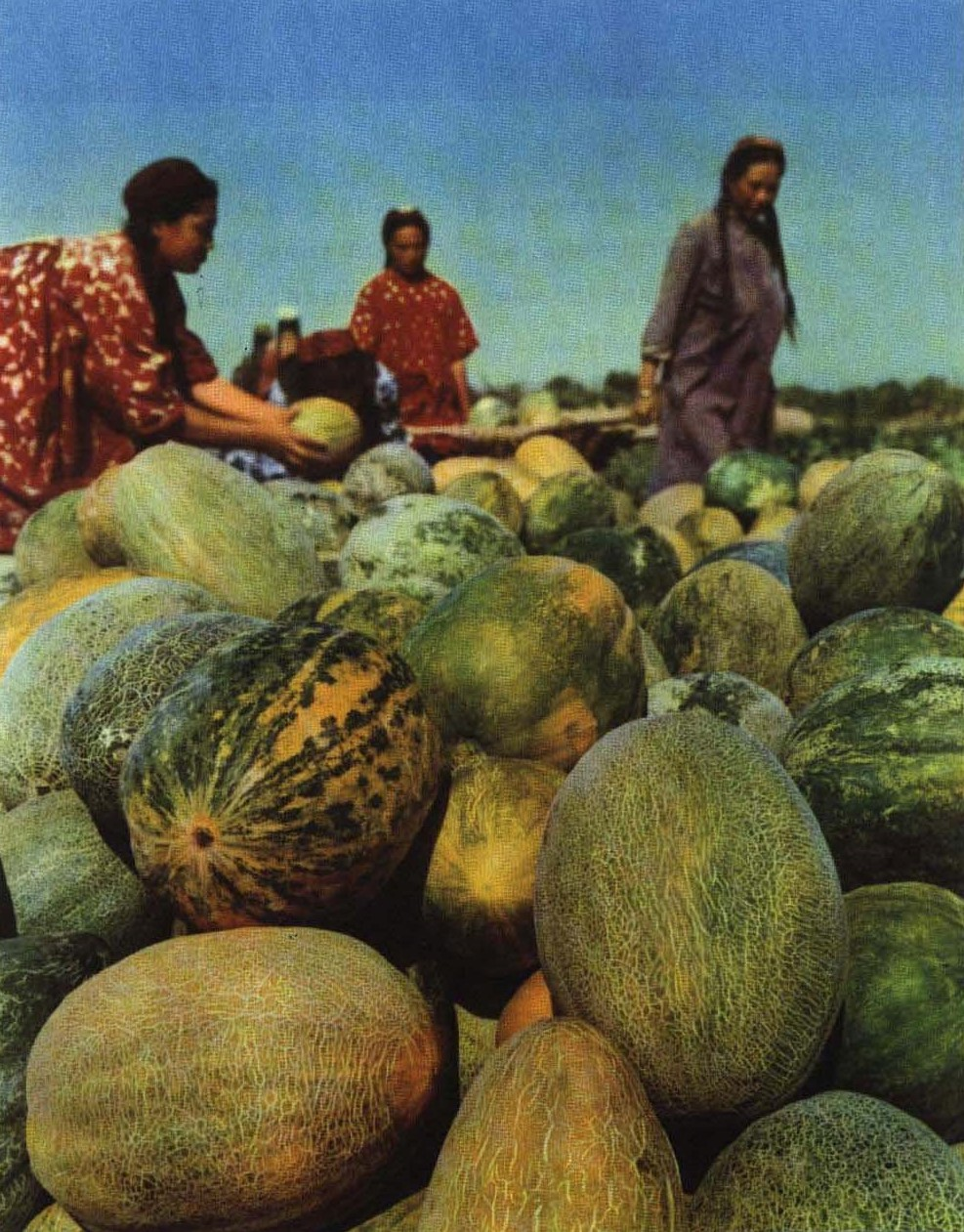
Harvesting hami melon at Hami in 1965

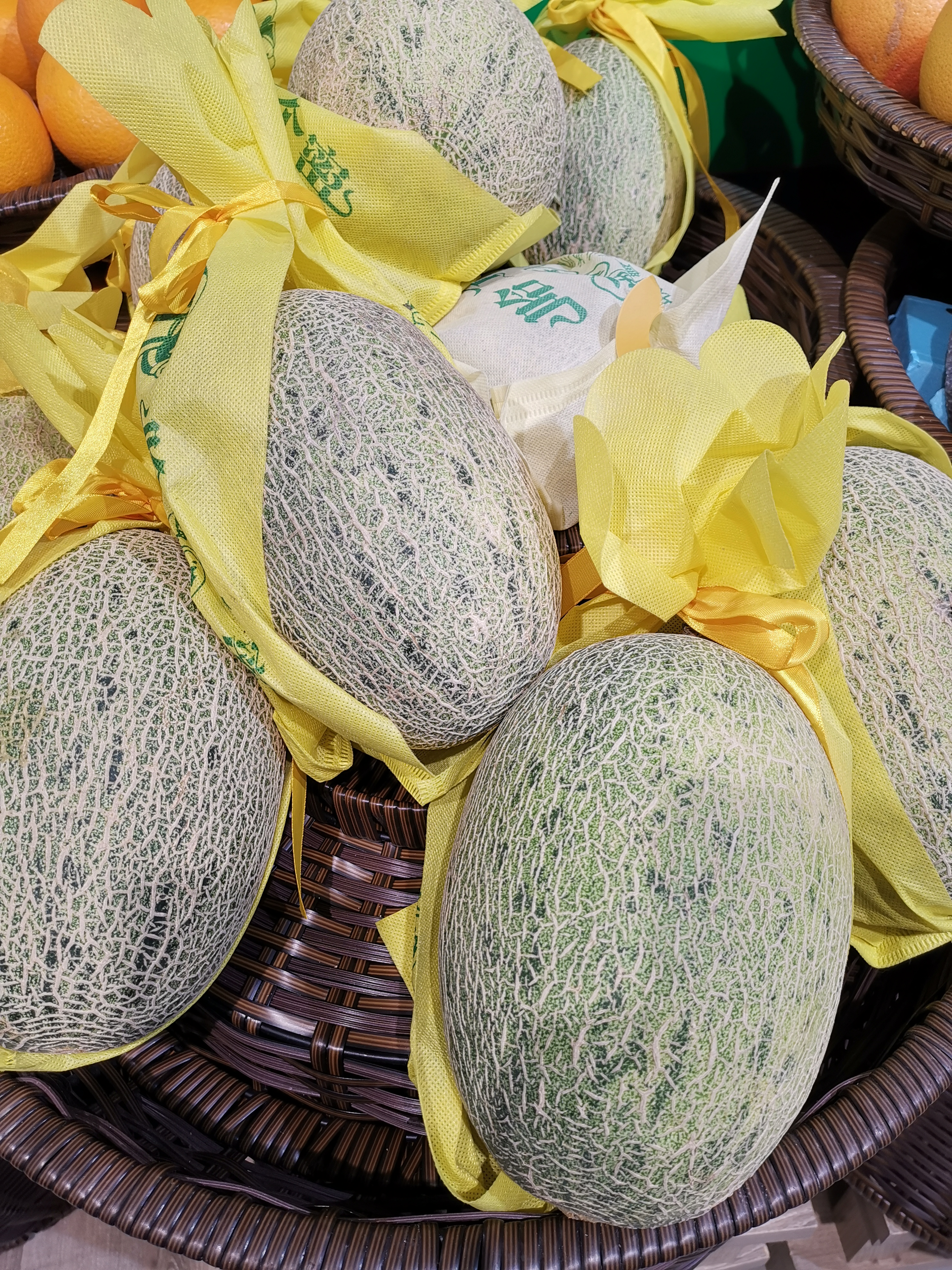
Hami melons at a market in Urumqi
