= Hami =

Prefecture-level city in Xinjiang, China

Hami: 哈密市 (Chinese); قۇمۇل شەھىرى (Uyghur); Kumul, Qumul
- Prefecture-level city
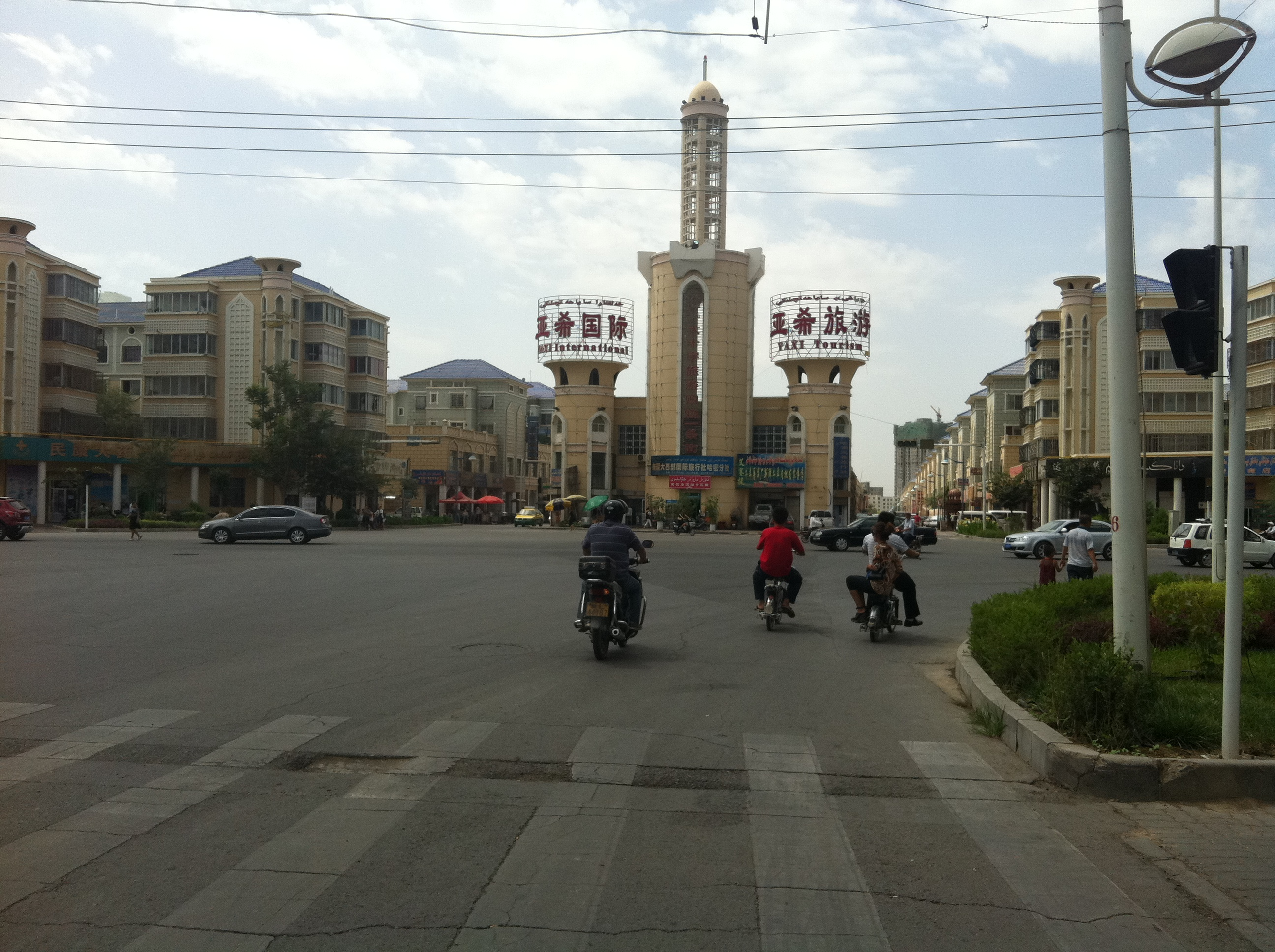

- Hami Prefecture (red) in Xinjiang (orange)

- Location of the city center in Xinjiang Hami (China)
- Coordinates (Hami municipal government): 42°49′09″N 93°30′54″E
- Country: People's Republic of China
- Autonomous region: Xinjiang
- Municipal seat: Yizhou District

Area
  - Total: 137,222 km^{2} (52,982 sq mi)
- Elevation: 759 m (2,490 ft)

Population (2020)
  - Total: 673,383
  - Density: 4.90725/km^{2} (12.7097/sq mi)

GDP
  - Total: CN¥ 108.4 billion US$ 15.2 billion
  - Per capita: CN¥ 162,151; US$ 22,769
- Time zone: UTC+8 (China Standard)
- Postal code: 839000
- ISO 3166 code: CN-XJ-05

Hami

Chinese name
- Chinese: 哈密
Transcriptions
Standard Mandarin
- Hanyu Pinyin: Hāmì
- Wade–Giles: Ha1-mi4
other Mandarin
- Xiao'erjing: خَامِ

Mongolian name
- Mongolian Cyrillic: Хамил хот
- Mongolian script: ᠬᠠᠮᠢᠯ ᠬᠣᠲᠠ
Transcriptions
- SASM/GNC: Qamil qota

Uyghur name
- Uyghur: قۇمۇل
Transcriptions
- Latin Yëziqi: Qumul
- Yengi Yeziⱪ: Ⱪumul
- SASM/GNC: K̂umul
- Siril Yëziqi: Қумул

Hami (Chinese: 哈密; pinyin: Hāmì), or Kumul (Uyghur: قۇمۇل, romanized: Qumul), is a prefecture-level city in eastern Xinjiang, China. It is well known for sweet Hami melons. In early 2016, the former Hami county-level city merged with Hami Prefecture to form the Hami prefecture-level city with the county-level city becoming Yizhou District. Since the Han dynasty, Hami has been known for its production of agricultural products and raw resources.

== History ==
=== Origins and names ===
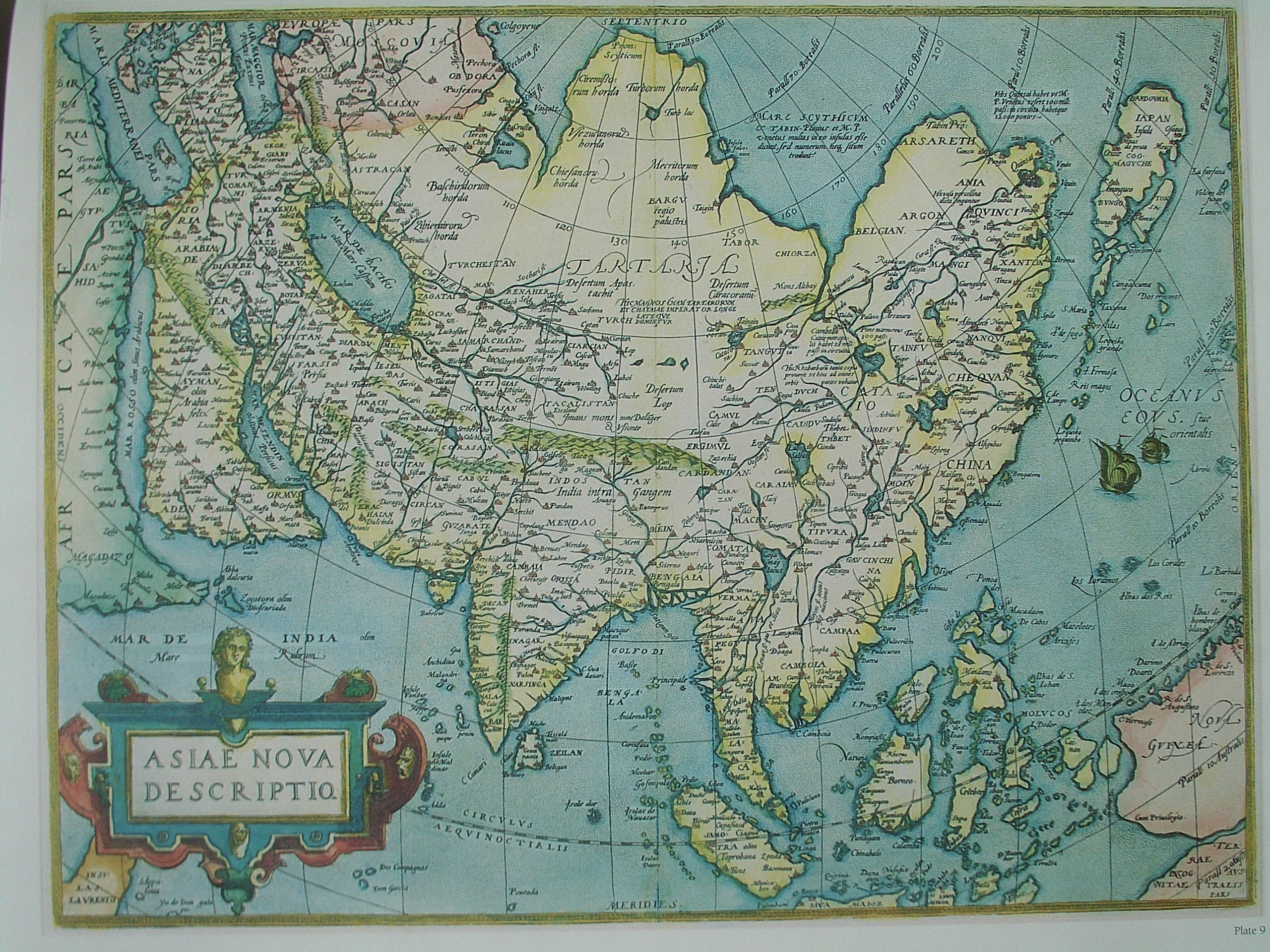
"Camul" (Kumul) shown in the middle or Asia, halfway between "Samarchand" and "Cataio", on a 1570 map by Abraham Ortelius

Cumuḍa (sometimes Cimuda or Cunuda) is the oldest known endonym of Hami, when it was founded by a people known in Han Chinese sources as the Xiao Yuezhi ("Lesser Yuezhi"), during the 1st millennium BCE.

The oldest attested Chinese name is "昆莫" (Kūnmò). By the time of the Han dynasty, it was referred to in Chinese as "伊吾" (Yīwú) or "伊吾卢" (Yīwúlú). Under the Tang dynasty, it was also known as Yīzhōu, 伊州. The name I-gou, I-gu, Igu, &c. sometimes encountered in European discussion of Hami was a mistaken form of Yiwu introduced by Stanislas Julien in his translation of Huili's biography of Xuanzang.

By the 10th century CE, the city and its residents were known to the Han as "仲雲" (pinyin: Zhòngyún; Wade–Giles: Chung-yün). A monk named Gao Juhui, who had traveled to the Tarim Basin, wrote that the Zhongyun were descendants of the Xiao Yuezhi and that the king of Zhongyun lived near Lop Nur.

Following the subsequent settlement of Uyghur-speaking people in the area, Cumuḍa became known as Čungul, Xungul, Qumul, Qomul and Kumul (Yengi Yezik̡: K̡umul, K̡omul).

The toponym Yīwúlú also appears as "伊吾廬" in the History of the Yuan dynasty, the biographies of which include references to the place using both names: Baurchuk Art Tekin (巴而朮阿而忒的斤) bases his troops at Hāmìlì in juan 122, while one Tabun (塔本) is recorded as being a man of Yīwúlú in juan 124.

During the Yuan dynasty the Mongolian name for the place, Qamil, transcribed into Chinese as "哈密力" (Hāmìlì), was widely used.

Marco Polo reported visiting "Camul" in the early 14th century and that was the name under which it first appeared on European maps, during the 16th century.

From the Ming dynasty onwards, Qumul was known in Han sources as "哈密" (Hāmì).

When Matteo Ricci visited the city in 1605, in his account of the Portuguese Jesuit Benedict Goës, he used the same spelling as well.

Lionel Giles has recorded the following names (with his Wade–Giles forms of the Chinese names converted to Pinyin):

- Kunwu (Zhou)
- Yiwu or Yiwulu (Han)
- Yiwu Jun (Sui)
- Yizhou or Yi Zhou (Tang)
- Kumul, Kamul, Camul (Turkic)
- Khamil (Mongol)
- Hami (modern Chinese name)

The modern Chinese name Hami was originally applied to the wider province, which had its historic capital at Qocho 325 km to the west of the city of Hami.

=== History since the Later Han dynasty (10th century CE) ===
During the Later Han dynasty, Hami repeatedly changed hands between the Chinese and Uyghurs, who both wanted to control this fertile and strategic oasis. Several times, the Han set up military agricultural colonies to feed their troops and supply trade caravans. It was especially noted for its melons, raisins and wine.

"The region of Yiwu [Hami] is favourable for the five types of grain [rice, two kinds of millet, wheat and beans], mulberry trees, hemp, and grapes. Further north is Liuzhong [Lukchun]. All these places are fertile. This is why the Han have constantly struggled with the Xiongnu over Jushi [Turfan/Jimasa] and Yiwu [Hamich], for the control of the Western Regions."

The decline of the Xiongnu and the Han dynasty led to relative stability and peace for Hami and the surrounding area. However, in 456, the Northern Wei dynasty occupied the Hami region. Based here, they launched raids against the Rouran Khaganate. After the decline of the Northern Wei dynasty around the 6th century, the First Turkic Khaganate assumed control of the region. Hami was then tossed around between the western and eastern branches of the khaganate.

Xuanzang visited the oasis town, famous for its melons, the first of a string of oases supplied by the Tian Shan Mountains. This water had been preserved in underground wells and channels since time immemorial. The town had long been inhabited by a Chinese military colony. During the early Tang dynasty and reaching into the Sui dynasty, the Chinese colony had accepted Turkic rule. Xuanzang stayed at a monastery inhabited at the time by three Chinese monks.

The Tang dynasty asserted control over the region and occupied Hami in the 7th century. The Tibetan Empire and the Tang vied for control of the region until the Chinese were repelled in 851. After the collapse of the Uyghur Khaganate, a group of Uyghurs migrated to the Hami region and ushered in an era of linguistic and cultural change of the local population. The Mongols conquered this region during the Yuan dynasty. Later, Gunashiri, a descendant of Chagatai Khan, founded his own small state called Qara Del in Kumul or Hami, which accepted Ming supremacy in the early 15th century, but was conquered by another branch of Mongols later on.

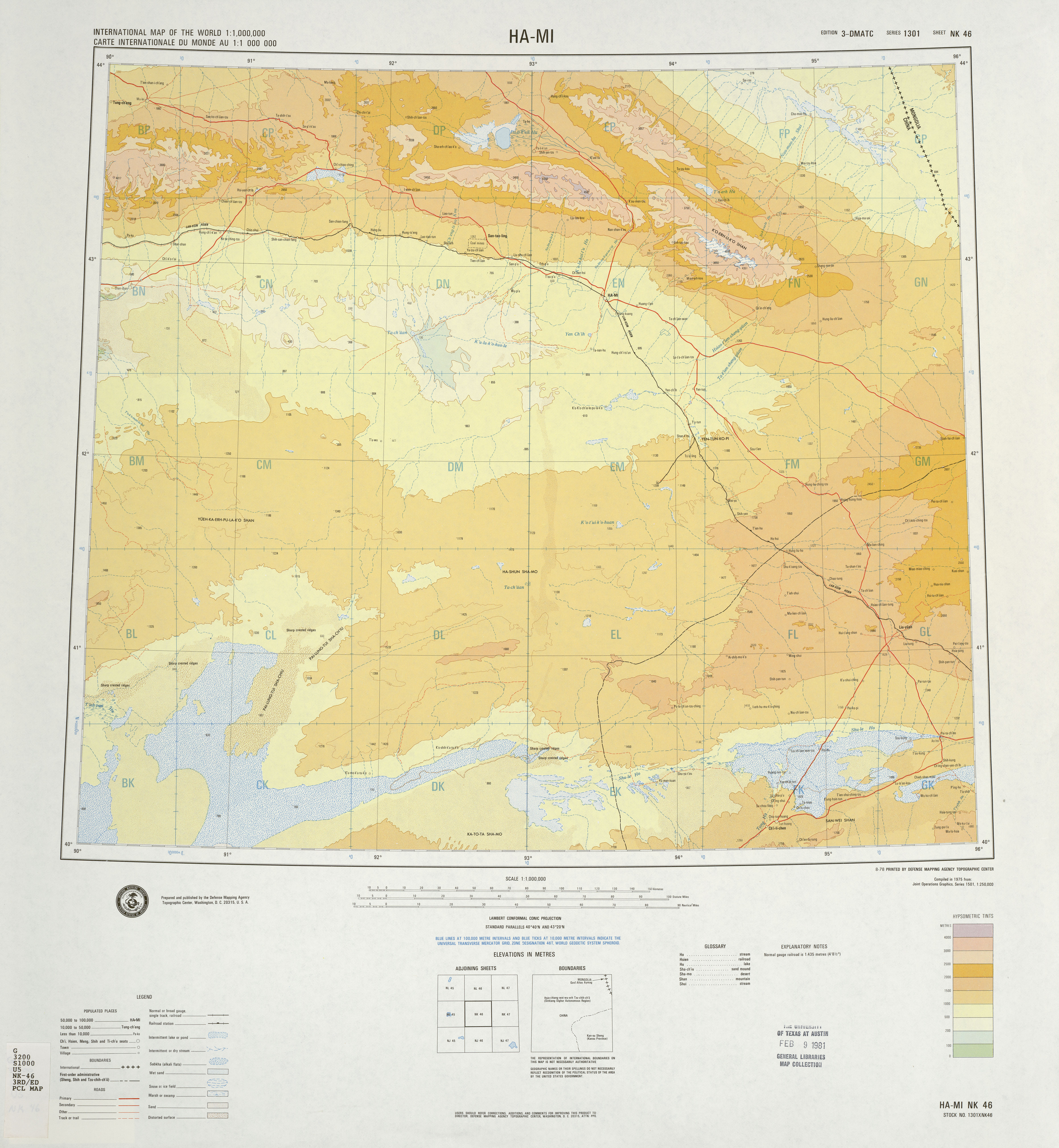
Map of Hami (labeled as HA-MI) and surrounding region from the International Map of the World (1975)

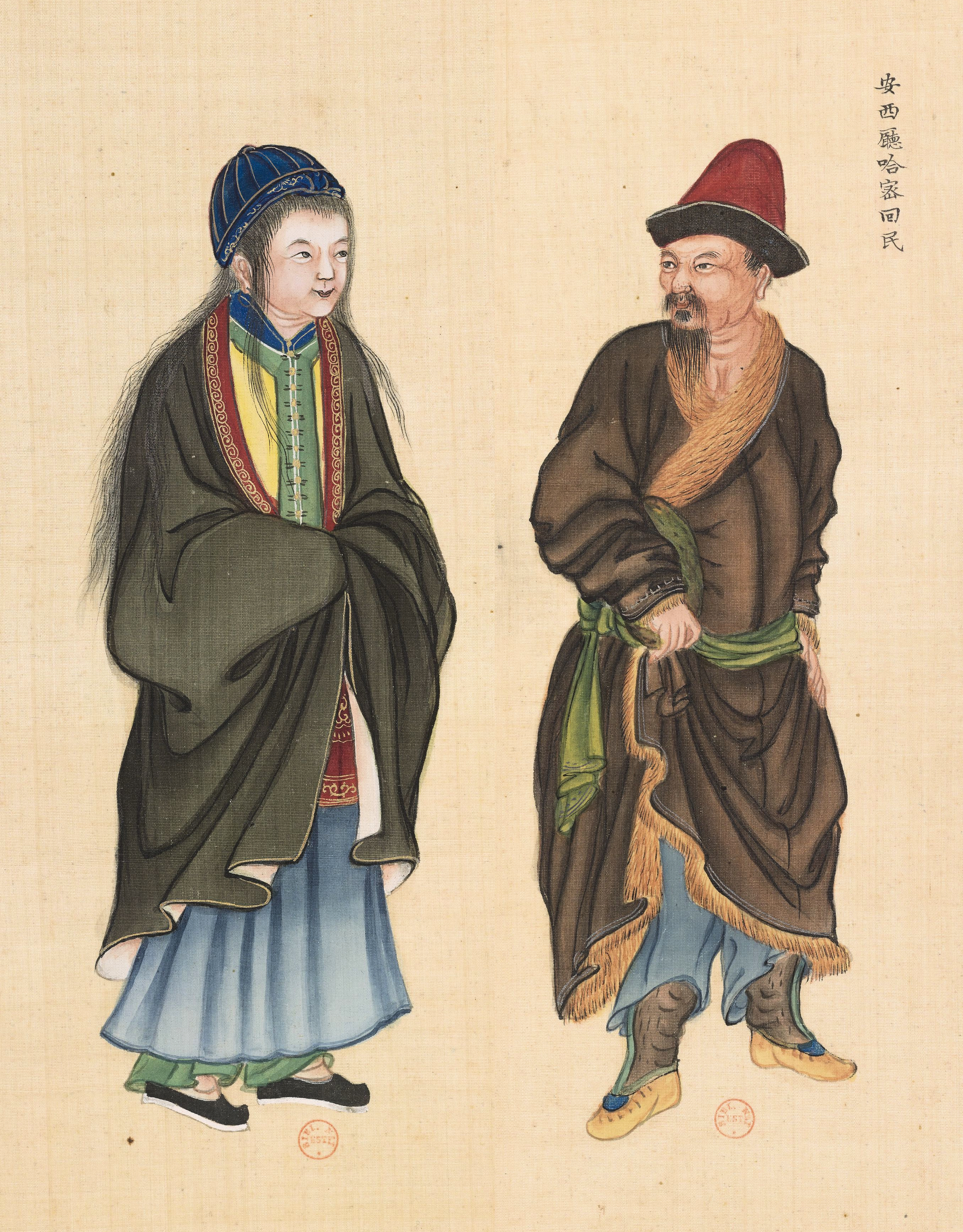
Uyghur people from Hami, in Anxi subprefecture. Huang Qing Zhigong Tu, 1769

The Ming dynasty established this region as Kumul Hami in 1404 after the Mongol kingdom Qara Del accepted its supremacy. But it was later controlled by Oirat Mongols. Hami was conquered and converted to Islam in 1513. Since the 18th century, Kumul became the center of the Kumul Khanate, a semi-autonomous vassal state within the Qing Empire and the Republic of China as part of Xinjiang. The last ruler of the khanate was Maqsud Shah.

A traveler in 1888 gave the following description of the city:

""The kingdom of Ha-mi contains a great number of villages and hamlets, but it has, properly, only one city, which is its capital, and has the same name. It is surrounded by a lofty wall, which is half a league in circumference, and has two gates, one of which fronts the east, and the other the west. These gates are exceedingly beautiful and make a fine appearance at a distance. The streets are straight, and well laid out; but the houses (which contain only a ground-floor, and which are almost all constructed of earth) make very little shew: however, as this city enjoys a serene sky, and is situated in a beautiful plain, watered by a river, and surrounded by mountains which shelter it from the north winds, it is a most agreeable and delightful residence. On whatever side one approaches it, gardens may be seen, which contain everything that a fertile and cultivated soil can produce in the mildest climates. All the surrounding fields are enchanting, but they do not extend far, for on several sides they terminate in dry plains, where a number of beautiful horses are fed, and a species of excellent sheep, which have large flat tails that sometimes weigh three hundred pounds. The country of Ha-mi appears to be very abundant in fossils and valuable minerals: the Chinese have, for a long time, procured diamonds and a great deal of gold from it; at present, it supplies them with a kind of agate, on which they set a great value."

== Geography and climate ==
Hami is located at the border with Gansu province. It is characterized by strong elevation gradients between the low elevations of the Hami basin and peaks up to circa 4,900 metres or 16,000 feet above sea level in the Qarlik and Barkol mountain ranges.

Hami (Kumul) is in a fault depression at 759 m (2,490 ft) above sea level, and has a temperate zone, continental desert climate (Köppen BWk) (see Hami Desert), with extreme differences between summer and winter, and dry, sunny weather year-round. On average, there is only 43.6 mm (1.72 in) of precipitation annually, occurring on 25 days of the year. With monthly percent possible sunshine ranging from 68% in December to 79% in September and October, the city receives 3,285 hours of bright sunshine annually, making it one of the sunniest nationally. The monthly 24-hour average temperature ranges from −9.8 °C (14.4 °F) in January to 26.8 °C (80.2 °F) in July, while the annual mean is 10.25 °C (50.4 °F). The diurnal temperature variation is typically large, at about an average 15 °C (27 °F) for the year.

Climate data for Hami (Kumul), elevation 737 m (2,418 ft), (1991–2020 normals, extremes 1951–present)
Month	Jan	Feb	Mar	Apr	May	Jun	Jul	Aug	Sep	Oct	Nov	Dec	Year
Record high °C (°F)	8.2 (46.8)	16.8 (62.2)	26.8 (80.2)	36.5 (97.7)	38.8 (101.8)	42.7 (108.9)	45.1 (113.2)	43.2 (109.8)	39.6 (103.3)	31.7 (89.1)	20.9 (69.6)	10.0 (50.0)	45.1 (113.2)
Mean daily maximum °C (°F)	−3.0 (26.6)	4.8 (40.6)	14.0 (57.2)	22.9 (73.2)	28.6 (83.5)	33.3 (91.9)	35.1 (95.2)	34.0 (93.2)	28.3 (82.9)	19.5 (67.1)	8.3 (46.9)	−1.2 (29.8)	18.7 (65.7)
Daily mean °C (°F)	−10.4 (13.3)	−3.2 (26.2)	5.9 (42.6)	14.9 (58.8)	20.7 (69.3)	25.6 (78.1)	27.2 (81.0)	25.1 (77.2)	18.2 (64.8)	9.4 (48.9)	0.4 (32.7)	−8.2 (17.2)	10.5 (50.8)
Mean daily minimum °C (°F)	−16.1 (3.0)	−9.7 (14.5)	−1.4 (29.5)	7.0 (44.6)	12.2 (54.0)	17.3 (63.1)	19.3 (66.7)	17.2 (63.0)	10.5 (50.9)	2.6 (36.7)	−4.9 (23.2)	−13.3 (8.1)	3.4 (38.1)
Record low °C (°F)	−31.9 (−25.4)	−28.8 (−19.8)	−24.5 (−12.1)	−11.7 (10.9)	−1.6 (29.1)	5.6 (42.1)	9.4 (48.9)	5.4 (41.7)	−1.7 (28.9)	−9.6 (14.7)	−27.6 (−17.7)	−32.0 (−25.6)	−32.0 (−25.6)
Average precipitation mm (inches)	1.4 (0.06)	1.1 (0.04)	1.5 (0.06)	3.5 (0.14)	3.6 (0.14)	8.5 (0.33)	8.6 (0.34)	5.3 (0.21)	2.7 (0.11)	3.1 (0.12)	3.0 (0.12)	2.3 (0.09)	44.6 (1.76)
Average precipitation days (≥ 0.1 mm)	2.3	1.0	1.0	1.4	2.2	3.5	5.0	3.1	1.7	1.5	1.3	1.7	25.7
Average snowy days	4.3	1.4	0.9	0.3	0	0	0	0	0	0.2	1.6	3.0	11.7
Average relative humidity (%)	63	47	31	27	32	37	42	43	46	49	54	62	44
Mean monthly sunshine hours	207.5	223.9	285.2	304.1	349.9	339.4	340.1	326.5	301.4	266.4	211.0	192.3	3,347.7
Percentage possible sunshine	70	74	76	75	77	74	74	77	82	80	74	69	75
Source: China Meteorological AdministrationNOAAall-time record highall-time September high

== Administrative divisions ==
map
#	Name	Hanzi	Hanyu Pinyin	Uyghur (UEY)	Uyghur Latin (ULY)	Population (2020 census)	Area (km^{2})	Density (/km^{2})
1	Yizhou District	伊州区	Yīzhōu Qū	ئىۋىرغول رايونى	Iwirghol Rayoni	569,388	80,791	7.05
2	Yiwu County	伊吾县	Yīwú Xiàn	ئارا تۈرۈك ناھىيىسى	Ara Türük Nahiyisi	38,464	19,530	1.97
3	Barkol Kazakh Autonomous County	巴里坤哈萨克自治县	Bālǐkūn Hāsàkè Zìzhìxiàn	باركۆل قازاق ئاپتونوم ناھىيىسى	Barköl Qazaq Aptonom Nahiyisi	65,531	36,901	1.78

== Demographics ==
As of 2017, Hami had a population of about 580,000, of which 68.4% were Han Chinese and 31.6% ethnic minorities, mostly Uyghurs, Kazakhs, and Hui.

As of 2015, 427,657 (76.6%) of the 616,711 residents of the county were Han Chinese, 109,072 (17.6%) were Uyghur, 55,550 (9.0%) were Kazakh and 17,588 (2.8%) were Hui.

The proportion of nationalities in Hami (Kumul) City
Nationality	Percentage
Han	65.5%
Uyghurs	20.0%
Kazakhs	10.0%
Hui	3.2%
Mongols	0.5%
Others	0.8%
Source of the population statistics:

== Economy ==
The Hami area is known for its large amount of high quality raw resources with 76 kinds of metals already detected. The major mineral resources of this area include coal, iron, copper, nickel, gold.

A newly discovered nickel deposit in Hami is estimated to contain reserves of over 15.8 million tons of the metal, it therefore ranks as China's second largest nickel mine. Around 900,000 tons of nickel has already been detected. Some local copper and nickel mining enterprises are reported to have begun operation, with Xinjiang Nonferrous Metals Group mining company running its nickel smelter crude production furnace at Hami Industrial Park.

China is building a field of ICBM silos near Hami, about 380 km (240 miles) northwest of another field near Yumen.

== Transport ==
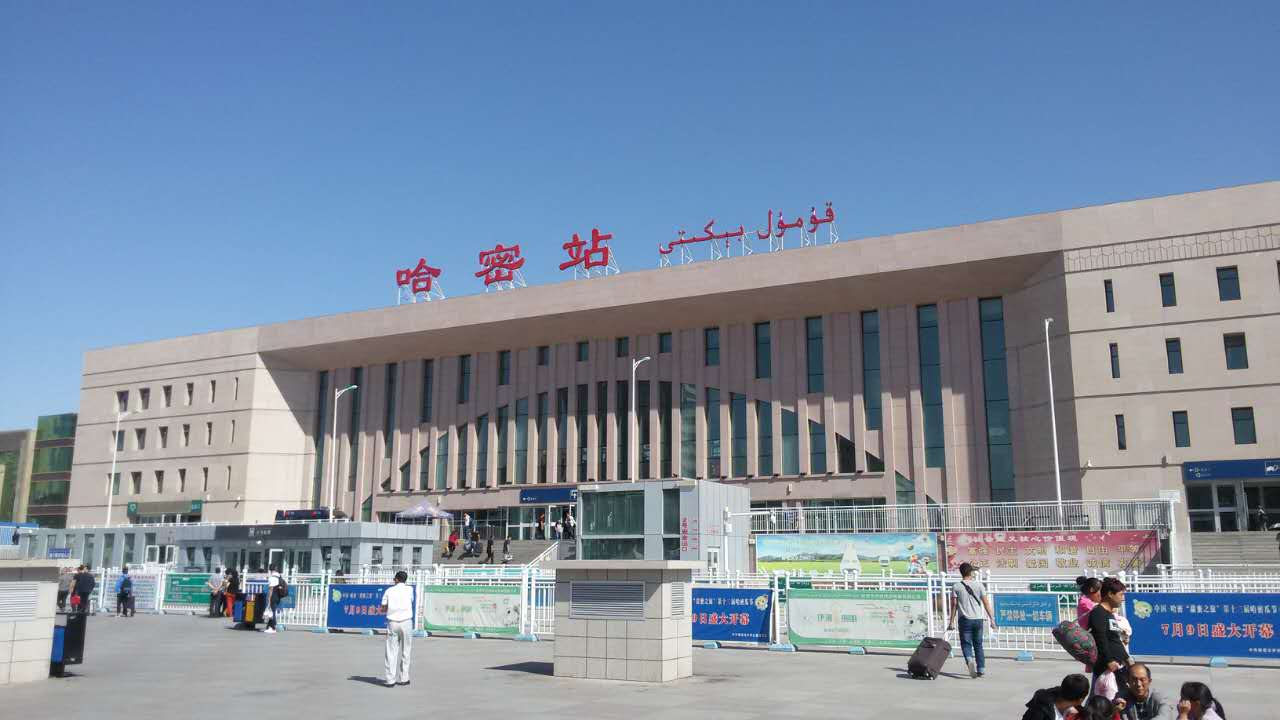
Hami Railway Station

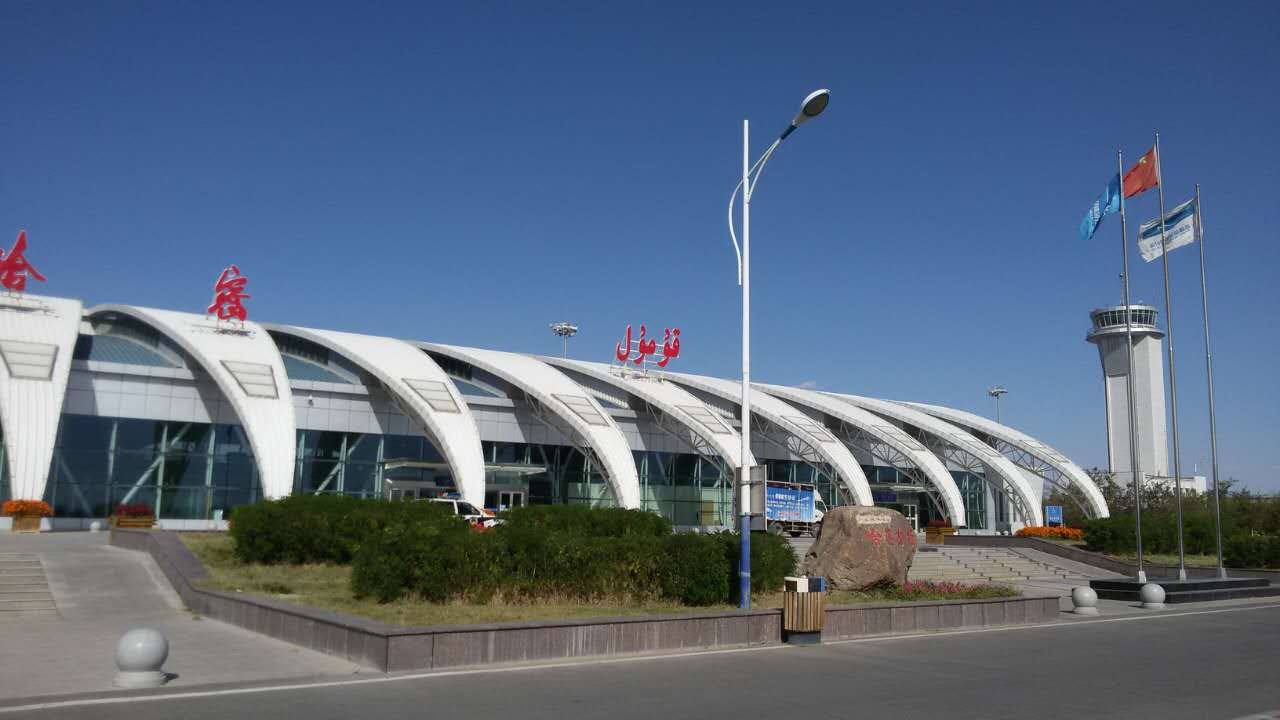
Hami Airport

Hami is connected to Xinjiang and the rest of China by both high-speed and conventional rail links. The Lanzhou–Xinjiang High-Speed Railway, a passenger dedicated high speed rail line running 1,776 kilometers (1,104 mi) from Lanzhou in Gansu Province to Ürümqi passes through the city. Hami is a stopping point for the Lanzhou–Xinjiang Railway and Ejin–Hami Railway, two lines that are part of trans-national transport corridors. The Lanzhou–Xinjiang Railway carries passengers and freight, connecting the rest of China to Central Asia and beyond as part of the New Eurasian Land Bridge through a border cross in Kazakhstan, and the Ejin–Hami Railway moves passengers and freight as part of a planned corridor beginning in the Bohai Gulf in North China to Torugart Pass on the border with Kyrgyzstan. A short rail line of 374.83 km (233 mi) transports potassium salts mined near Lop Nur to Hami.

By road Hami is located along China National Highway 312, an east–west route of 4,967 km (3,086 mi) from Shanghai to Khorgas, Xinjiang in the Ili River valley, on the border with Kazakhstan.

Hami Yizhou Airport is a one-gate airport located 12.5 km (7.8 mi) northeast of the city center.

== See also ==
- Khoja Niyaz
- Hami melon
