= Yizhou District, Hami =

Yizhou: 伊州区 (Chinese); ئىۋىرغول رايونى (Uyghur); Iwirghol
- District
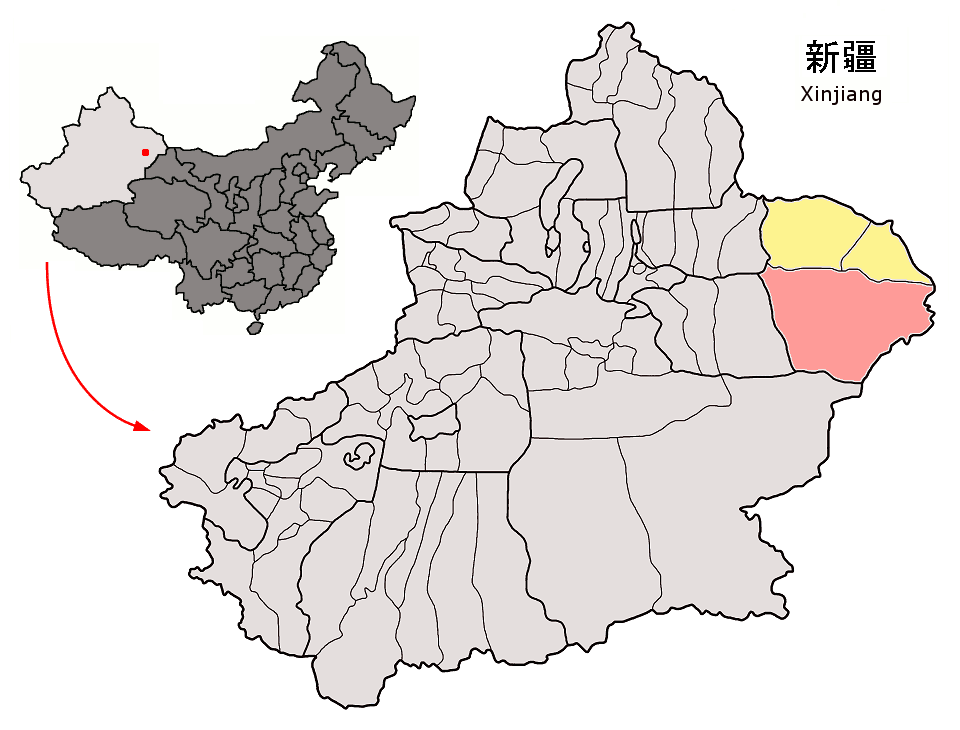
- Location of Yizhou (red) in Hami (yellow) and Xinjiang

- Location of the seat in Xinjiang Yizhou (China)
- Country: China
- Region: Xinjiang
- Prefecture-level city: Komul
- Township-level divisions: 3 subdistricts 2 towns 7 townships
- District seat: Donghe Subdistrict (Sherqi Osteng)

Area
  - District: 80,791 km^{2} (31,194 sq mi)
  - Urban: 103.58 km^{2} (39.99 sq mi)

Population (2020)
  - District: 569,388
  - Density: 7.0477/km^{2} (18.253/sq mi)
  - Urban: 246,373
  - Urban density: 2,378.6/km^{2} (6,160.5/sq mi)
- Time zone: UTC+8 (China Standard (Note: Locals in Xinjiang frequently observe UTC+6 (Xinjiang Time), 2 hours behind Beijing.))
- Website: www.xjhm.gov.cn

Yizhou District, Hami

Chinese name
- Simplified Chinese: 伊州区
- Traditional Chinese: 伊州區
Transcriptions
Standard Mandarin
- Hanyu Pinyin: Yīzhōu Qū

Uyghur name
- Uyghur: ئىۋىرغول رايونى
Transcriptions
- Latin Yëziqi: Iwirghol Rayoni
- Siril Yëziqi: Ивирғол Райони

Yizhou (Uyghur: ئىۋىرغول رايونى, romanized: Iwirghol; Chinese: 伊州; pinyin: Yīzhōu) is the central district of the Hami prefecture-level city, in Xinjiang Uyghur Autonomous Region, China. Its population was 472,175 at the end of 2010. It was known as Hami county-level city until February 2016, when it was merged with the Hami Prefecture to form the Hami prefecture-level city and the county-level city was renamed Yizhou District. Xingxingxia (Singsingsia) town (星星峡镇) is located on the border with Gansu.

On February 4, 2021, the city of Xinxing (Yengi Yultuz), along with several farms and ranches belonging to XPCC were separated from Yizhou District, and formed an independent county-level city.

== Subdivisions ==
Yizhou District is divided into 5 subdistricts, 7 towns, 10 townships, 2 ethnic townships.

| Name | Simplified Chinese | Hanyu Pinyin | Uyghur (UEY) | Uyghur Latin (ULY) | Administrative division code | Notes |
|---|---|---|---|---|---|---|
Subdistricts
| Donghe Subdistrict (Sherqi Osteng) | 东河街道 | Dōnghé Jiēdào | شەرقىي ئۆستەڭ كوچا باشقارمىسى | Sherqiy Östeng kocha bashqarmisi | 650502001 | |
| Xihe Subdistrict (Gherbiy Osteng) | 西河街道 | Xīhé Jiēdào | غەربىي ئۆستەڭ كوچا باشقارمىسى | Gherbiy Östeng kocha bashqarmisi | 650502002 | |
| Chengbei Subdistrict | 城北街道 | Chéngběi Jiēdào | شەھەر شىمالىي كوچا باشقارمىسى | Sheher shimaliy kocha bashqarmisi | 650502003 | |
| Liyuan Subdistrict | 丽园街道 | Lìyuán Jiēdào | گۈلباغ كوچا باشقارمىسى | Gülbagh kocha bashqarmisi | 650502004 | |
| Shiyou Xincheng Subdistrict | 石油新城街道 | Shíyóu xīnchéng Jiēdào | نېفىتلىك يېڭى شەھىرى كوچا باشقارمىسى | Nëfitlik yëngi shehiri kocha bashqarmisi | 650502005 | |
Towns
| Yamansu Town | 雅满苏镇 | Yǎmǎnsū Zhèn | يامانسۇ بازىرى | Yamansu baziri | 650502100 | |
| Yêttêkhudukh Town (Qijiaojing Town) | 七角井镇 | Qījiǎojǐng Zhèn | يەتتەقۇدۇق بازىرى | Yettequduq baziri | 650502101 | |
| Xingxingxia Town (Arayultuz Town) | 星星峡镇 | Xīngxīngxiá Zhèn | ئارايۇلتۇز (شىڭشىڭشيا) بازىرى | Arayultuz (Shingshingshya) baziri | 650502102 | |
| Astanê Town (Erpu Town) | 二堡镇 | Èrpù Zhèn | ئاستانە بازىرى | Astane baziri | 650502103 | |
| Palwantur Town (Taojiagong Town) | 陶家宫镇 | Táojiāgōng Zhèn | پالۋانتۇر بازىرى | Palwantur baziri | 650502104 | |
| Kharadöwê Town (Wupu Town) | 五堡镇 | Wǔpù Zhèn | قارادۆۋە بازىرى | Qaradöwe baziri | 650502105 | |
| Taranqi Town (Sandaoling Town) | 三道岭镇 | Sāndàolǐng Zhèn | تارانچى بازىرى | Taranchi baziri | 650502106 | |
Townships
| Taxwelikh Township (Qincheng Township) | 沁城乡 | Qìnchéng Xiāng | تاشۋېلىق يېزىسى | Tashwëliq yëzisi | 650502200 | |
| Khoxkhudukh Township (Shuangjingzi Township) | 双井子乡 | Shuāngjǐngzǐ Xiāng | قوشقۇدۇق يېزىسى | Qoshquduq yëzisi | 650502202 | |
| Bulungtoghrakh Township (Daquanwan Township) | 大泉湾乡 | Dàquánwān Xiāng | بۇلۇڭتوغراق يېزىسى | Bulungtoghraq yëzisi | 650502203 | |
| Xêhhêr Iqi Township (Huicheng Township) | 回城乡 | Huíchéng Xiāng | شەھەر ئىچى يېزىسى | Sheher Ichi yëzisi | 650502205 | |
| Rahhêtbagh Township (Huayuan Township) | 花园乡 | Huāyuán Xiāng | راھەتباغ يېزىسى | Rahetbagh yëzisi | 650502206 | |
| Boghaz Township (Nanhu Township) | 南湖乡 | Nánhú Xiāng | بوغاز يېزىسى | Boghaz yëzisi | 650502207 | |
| Ghêrbitagh Township (Xishan Township) | 西山乡 | Xīshān Xiāng | غەربىتاغ يېزىسى | Gherbitagh yëzisi | 650502210 | |
| Tianshan Township | 天山乡 | Tiānshān Xiāng | تەڭرىتاغ يېزىسى | Tengritagh yëzisi | 650502211 | |
| Akhtax Township (Baishitou Township) | 白石头乡 | Báishítóu Xiāng | ئاقتاش يېزىسى | Aqtash yëzisi | 650502212 | |
| Khoylukh Township (Liushugou Township) | 柳树沟乡 | Liǔshùgōu Xiāng | قويلۇق يېزىسى | Qoyluq yëzisi | 650502214 | |
Ethics Townships
| Ulatay Kazakh Ethnic Township | 乌拉台哈萨克民族乡 | Wūlātái Hāsàkè Mínzúxiāng | ئۇلاتاي قازاق يېزىسى | Ulatay qazaq yëzisi | 650502201 | (Kazakh) ۇلاتاي قازاق ۇلتتىق اۋىلى; Үлатай Қазақ Ұлттық ауылы |
| Däwêldürük Kazakh Ethnic Township | 德外里都如克哈萨克族乡 | Déwàilǐdōurúkè Hāsàkèzú Xiāng | دەۋەلدۈرۈك قازاق يېزىسى | Deweldürük qazaq yëzisi | 650502209 | (Kazakh) دەبەلدىرىك قازاق ۇلتتىق اۋىلى; Дэбэлдырык Қазақ Ұлттық ауылы |

== Demographics ==
The statistic below also includes the now independent Xinxing (Yengi Yultuz) City.

The proportion of nationalities in Yizhou (Iwirghol) District
| Nationality | Percentage |
| Han People | 68.4% |
| Uyghurs | 23.5% |
| Hui People | 3.9% |
| Kazakhs | 3.0% |
| Mongols | 0.3% |
| Others | 0.9% |
Source of the population statistics :

== Climate ==
Climate data for Hongliuhe Station, Yizhou District, elevation 1,574 m (5,164 ft), (1991–2020 normals)
| Month | Jan | Feb | Mar | Apr | May | Jun | Jul | Aug | Sep | Oct | Nov | Dec | Year |
|---|---|---|---|---|---|---|---|---|---|---|---|---|---|
| Mean daily maximum °C (°F) | −3.6 (25.5) | 2.1 (35.8) | 10.4 (50.7) | 18.3 (64.9) | 23.6 (74.5) | 28.6 (83.5) | 31.1 (88.0) | 30.1 (86.2) | 24.1 (75.4) | 15.7 (60.3) | 5.9 (42.6) | −2.4 (27.7) | 15.3 (59.6) |
| Daily mean °C (°F) | −11.9 (10.6) | −6.4 (20.5) | 1.8 (35.2) | 9.9 (49.8) | 15.9 (60.6) | 21.6 (70.9) | 24.0 (75.2) | 22.6 (72.7) | 16.0 (60.8) | 7.2 (45.0) | −2.3 (27.9) | −10.3 (13.5) | 7.3 (45.2) |
| Mean daily minimum °C (°F) | −18.1 (−0.6) | −13.3 (8.1) | −5.7 (21.7) | 2.1 (35.8) | 7.9 (46.2) | 14.0 (57.2) | 16.8 (62.2) | 15.5 (59.9) | 8.9 (48.0) | 0.1 (32.2) | −8.5 (16.7) | −16.1 (3.0) | 0.3 (32.5) |
| Average precipitation mm (inches) | 1.3 (0.05) | 1.8 (0.07) | 1.4 (0.06) | 4.4 (0.17) | 6.4 (0.25) | 11.7 (0.46) | 11.1 (0.44) | 5.6 (0.22) | 4.5 (0.18) | 1.1 (0.04) | 2.8 (0.11) | 2.1 (0.08) | 54.2 (2.13) |
| Average precipitation days (≥ 0.1 mm) | 2.2 | 1.8 | 1.3 | 2.4 | 2.5 | 3.8 | 4.6 | 3.1 | 2.1 | 1.0 | 2.2 | 2.8 | 29.8 |
| Average snowy days | 4.4 | 3.1 | 1.6 | 1.0 | 0.2 | 0 | 0 | 0 | 0.2 | 0.4 | 2.6 | 4.7 | 18.2 |
| Average relative humidity (%) | 58 | 47 | 31 | 27 | 25 | 29 | 31 | 29 | 30 | 33 | 50 | 58 | 37 |
| Mean monthly sunshine hours | 232.3 | 232.4 | 288.8 | 301.4 | 334.8 | 317.4 | 321.4 | 314.9 | 299.6 | 287.9 | 229.7 | 218.8 | 3,379.4 |
| Percentage possible sunshine | 78 | 77 | 77 | 75 | 74 | 70 | 71 | 75 | 82 | 86 | 79 | 77 | 77 |
Source: China Meteorological Administration

Climate data for Shisanjianfang, Yizhou District, elevation 721 m (2,365 ft), (1991–2020 normals)
| Month | Jan | Feb | Mar | Apr | May | Jun | Jul | Aug | Sep | Oct | Nov | Dec | Year |
|---|---|---|---|---|---|---|---|---|---|---|---|---|---|
| Mean daily maximum °C (°F) | −3.4 (25.9) | 3.9 (39.0) | 13.5 (56.3) | 22.1 (71.8) | 28.3 (82.9) | 33.6 (92.5) | 35.8 (96.4) | 34.6 (94.3) | 28.3 (82.9) | 18.9 (66.0) | 8.1 (46.6) | −1.5 (29.3) | 18.5 (65.3) |
| Daily mean °C (°F) | −8.3 (17.1) | −1.8 (28.8) | 7.0 (44.6) | 15.5 (59.9) | 21.7 (71.1) | 27.4 (81.3) | 29.4 (84.9) | 28.1 (82.6) | 21.8 (71.2) | 12.9 (55.2) | 2.9 (37.2) | −6.2 (20.8) | 12.5 (54.6) |
| Mean daily minimum °C (°F) | −12.5 (9.5) | −6.5 (20.3) | 1.8 (35.2) | 10.1 (50.2) | 16.0 (60.8) | 22.0 (71.6) | 24.1 (75.4) | 22.8 (73.0) | 16.6 (61.9) | 8.2 (46.8) | −1.2 (29.8) | −10.1 (13.8) | 7.6 (45.7) |
| Average precipitation mm (inches) | 0.4 (0.02) | 0.1 (0.00) | 0.2 (0.01) | 0.7 (0.03) | 1.5 (0.06) | 6.2 (0.24) | 7.4 (0.29) | 5.6 (0.22) | 2.2 (0.09) | 0.8 (0.03) | 0.5 (0.02) | 0.2 (0.01) | 25.8 (1.02) |
| Average precipitation days (≥ 0.1 mm) | 9.6 | 9.0 | 8.4 | 8.2 | 8.3 | 8.4 | 9.4 | 7.1 | 5.7 | 7.7 | 10.6 | 10.9 | 103.3 |
| Average snowy days | 11.4 | 10.8 | 7.0 | 1.9 | 0.2 | 0 | 0 | 0 | 0.1 | 2.5 | 9.5 | 13.0 | 56.4 |
| Average relative humidity (%) | 52 | 38 | 28 | 25 | 23 | 25 | 27 | 26 | 25 | 31 | 42 | 51 | 33 |
| Mean monthly sunshine hours | 164.5 | 182.9 | 241.8 | 274.6 | 338.2 | 344.8 | 347.6 | 332.1 | 282.1 | 230.8 | 155.7 | 140.9 | 3,036 |
| Percentage possible sunshine | 58 | 61 | 64 | 66 | 72 | 73 | 74 | 77 | 77 | 70 | 56 | 53 | 67 |
Source: China Meteorological Administration
