= List of endangered languages in China =

Language Endangerment Status by UNESCO Atlas of the World's Languages in Danger category

Extinct (EX)
- Extinct (EX): (lists)

Endangered
- Critically Endangered (CR); Severely Endangered (SE); Definitely Endangered (DE); Vulnerable (VU): (list); (list); (list); (list)

Safe
- Safe (NE): no list
- Other categories
- Revived (RE); Constructed (CL): (list); (list)
- Related topics: Atlas of the World's Languages in Danger; Endangered Languages Project; Ethnologue; Unclassified language; List of languages by total number of speakers
- UNESCO Atlas of the World's; Languages in Danger categories

An endangered language is a language that it is at risk of falling out of use, generally because it has few surviving speakers. If it loses all of its native speakers, it becomes an extinct language. UNESCO defines four levels of language endangerment between "safe" (not endangered) and "extinct":

- Vulnerable
- Definitely endangered
- Severely endangered
- Critically endangered

== Languages ==
China
Language	Status	Comments	ISO 639-3
Adi language	Vulnerable	Also spoken in: India	adi
Aluo language	Definitely endangered		yna
Amis language	Vulnerable	Also spoken in: Taiwan. Formosan languages.	ami
Amok language	Critically endangered	Also spoken in: Laos, Burma, Thailand	mqt
Anung language	Critically endangered		nun
Aqaw Gelao language	Critically endangered		gio
Ayizi language	Critically endangered		yyz
Baheng language	Vulnerable		pha
Baima language	Vulnerable		bqh
Bokar language	Vulnerable	Also spoken in: India	adi
Bola language	Definitely endangered		bxd
Bonan language	Definitely endangered		peh
Bori language	Definitely endangered	Also spoken in: India	adi
Bunun language	Vulnerable	Also spoken in: Taiwan. Formosan languages.	bnn
Buryat language	Definitely endangered	(Manchuria). Also spoken in: Mongolia	bxm, bxr, bxu
Buyang language	Severely endangered		yzg, yha, yin
Chesu language	Definitely endangered		ych
Chintaw language	Critically endangered		xia
Choyi language	Definitely endangered		qvy
Cosung language	Definitely endangered		lkc
Dagur language	Critically endangered	(Amur).	dta
Ersu language	Definitely endangered		ers
Evenki language	Severely endangered	(Northeast China). Also spoken in: Russia	tuw-sol, orh
Fuyu Kyrgyz language	Critically endangered	(Northeast China). Belong to Siberian Turkic	
Gangou language	Severely endangered		
Gazhuo language	Definitely endangered		kaf
Green Gelao language	Critically endangered		giq
Guichong language	Vulnerable		gqi
Hlersu language	Vulnerable		hle
Hu language	Definitely endangered		huo
Huzhu Monguor language	Severely endangered		mjg
Idu language	Definitely endangered	Also spoken in: India	clk
Ili Turki language	Critically endangered		ili
Jinuo language	Definitely endangered		jiy, jiu
Jiongnai Bunu language	Definitely endangered		pnu
Jone language	Definitely endangered		cda
Kanakanavu language	Critically endangered	Also spoken in: Taiwan. Formosan languages.	xnb
Kangjia language	Severely endangered		kxs
Kathu language	Definitely endangered		ykt
Kavalan language	Critically endangered	Also spoken in: Taiwan. Formosan languages.	ckv
Khamba language	Definitely endangered	Also spoken in: India	kbg
Khamnigan Mongol language	Definitely endangered	Also spoken in: Mongolia, Russia	
Khmin language	Vulnerable		bgk
Kilen language	Critically endangered	Also spoken in: Russia	gld
Ladakhi language	Vulnerable	Also spoken in: India	can, lbj, tkk
Laemae language	Severely endangered		
Lai language	Definitely endangered		ply
Laji language	Critically endangered		lbt
Lajia language	Definitely endangered		lbc
Lalo language	Vulnerable		yik, ywt, yit, ywl
Lamu language	Critically endangered		llh
Laomian language	Definitely endangered		lwm
Lopnor Uighur	Critically endangered	Also known as Lopluk.	uig
Mak language	Definitely endangered		mkg
Manchu language	Critically endangered	(Amur).	mnc
Manchu language	Critically endangered	(Nonni).	mnc
Manchurian Kirghiz language	Critically endangered		
Manchurian Ölöt language	Severely endangered		
Mang language	Definitely endangered		zng
Maonan language	Vulnerable		mmd
Miju language	Vulnerable	Also spoken in: India	mxj
Minhe Monguor language	Definitely endangered		mjg
Miqie language	Definitely endangered		yiq
Mo'ang language	Definitely endangered		
Mok language	Definitely endangered		tlq
Motuo Menba language	Definitely endangered	Also spoken in: India	tsj
Mra language	Critically endangered	Also spoken in: India	
Muda language	Vulnerable		ymd
Muji language	Definitely endangered		ymx, ymq, ymc, ymi, ymz
Mulam language	Vulnerable		mlm
Mulao language	Severely endangered		
Muya language	Vulnerable		mvm
Na language	Critically endangered	Also spoken in: India	
Naluo language	Vulnerable		ylo
Namuyi language	Vulnerable		nmy
Nanay language	Severely endangered	Also spoken in: Russia	gld
Nataoran language	Critically endangered	Also spoken in: Taiwan. Formosan languages.	ais
Northern Tujia language	Severely endangered		tji
Numao Bunu language	Definitely endangered		bwx
Ordos language	Definitely endangered		drh, khk, mvf
Oyrat language	Definitely endangered	Also spoken in: Kyrgyzstan, Mongolia	xal
Paiwan language	Vulnerable	Also spoken in: Taiwan. Formosan languages.	pwn
Pakan language	Definitely endangered		bbh
Patua language	Critically endangered		mzs
Phula language	Vulnerable		ypa, ypg, ypo, yip, ypn, yhl, ypb, phh, ypm, ypp, yph, ypz
Pupeo language	Definitely endangered		laq
Pyuma language	Vulnerable	Also spoken in: Taiwan. Formosan languages.	pyu
Rao language	Definitely endangered		tct
Red Gelao language	Critically endangered		gir
Rukai language	Vulnerable	Also spoken in: Taiwan. Formosan languages.	dru
Saaroa language	Critically endangered	Also spoken in: Taiwan. Formosan languages.	sxr
Saisiyat language	Severely endangered	Also spoken in: Taiwan. Formosan languages.	xsy
Salar language	Vulnerable		slr
Samatao language	Critically endangered		ysd
Samatu language	Critically endangered		
Samei language	Severely endangered		smh
Sangkong language	Vulnerable		sgk
Santa language	Vulnerable		sce
Sanyi language	Severely endangered		ysy
Sarikoli language	Definitely endangered		srh
Saryg Yugur language	Severely endangered		ybe
She language	Critically endangered		shx
Sherpa language	Vulnerable	Also spoken in: India, Nepal	xsr
Shingsaba language	Vulnerable	Also spoken in: Nepal	lhm
Shira Yugur language	Severely endangered		yuy
Shixing language	Definitely endangered		sxg
Sibe language	Severely endangered		sjo
Sinkiang Dagur language	Definitely endangered		dta
Solon language	Definitely endangered		evn, orh
Southern Tujia language	Severely endangered		tjs
Sulung language	Definitely endangered	Also spoken in: India	suv
Talu language	Vulnerable		yta
Tanglang language	Vulnerable		ytl
Tangwang language	Definitely endangered		
Taroko language	Vulnerable	Also spoken in: Taiwan. Formosan languages.	trv
Taruang language	Vulnerable	Also spoken in: India, Burma	mhu
Tawang language	Vulnerable	Also spoken in: Bhutan, India	twm
Tayal language	Vulnerable	Also spoken in: Taiwan. Formosan languages.	tay
Thao language	Critically endangered	Also spoken in: Taiwan. Formosan languages.	ssf
Tinan language	Definitely endangered	Also spoken in: India	lbf
Tshangla language	Vulnerable	Also spoken in: Bhutan, India	tsj
Tsou language	Vulnerable	Also spoken in: Taiwan. Formosan languages.	tsy
Tuvan language	Vulnerable	Also spoken in: Mongolia, Russia	tyv
U language	Definitely endangered		uuu
Utsat language	Definitely endangered		huq
Wakhi language	Definitely endangered	Also spoken in: Pakistan, Tajikistan, Afghanistan	wbl
Waxiang language	Vulnerable		wxa
White Gelao language	Severely endangered		giw
Wunai Bunu language	Definitely endangered		bwn
Wuse language	Vulnerable		eee
Wutun language	Definitely endangered		wuh
Yami language	Vulnerable	Also spoken in: Taiwan. Formosan languages.	tao
Yerong language	Severely endangered		yrn
Younuo Bunu language	Definitely endangered		buh
Zaiwa language	Definitely endangered	Also spoken in: India	zkr
Zaozou language	Vulnerable		zal
Zhaba language	Vulnerable		zhb

== See also ==
- Lists of endangered languages
- Red Book of Endangered Languages
- Affirmative action in China
- List of endangered languages in Russia
