= List of Mongolic languages =

The Mongolic languages are a language family that is spoken in East-Central Asia, mostly in Mongolia, Inner Mongolia, an autonomous region of China, Xinjiang, another autonomous region of China, the region of Qinghai, and also in Kalmykia, a republic of Southern European Russia.

Mongolic is a small, relatively homogenous and recent language family whose common ancestor, Proto-Mongolian, was spoken at the beginning of the second millennium AD.

However, Proto-Mongolian seems to descend from a common ancestor to languages like Khitan, which are sister languages of Mongolian languages (they do not descend from Proto-Mongolian but are sister languages from an even older language from the first millennium AD, i.e. Para-Mongolian).

The Mongolic language family has about 6 million speakers. The best-known member of this language family, Mongolian, is the primary language of most of the residents of Mongolia and the Mongolian residents of Inner Mongolia, with an estimated 5.2 million speakers.

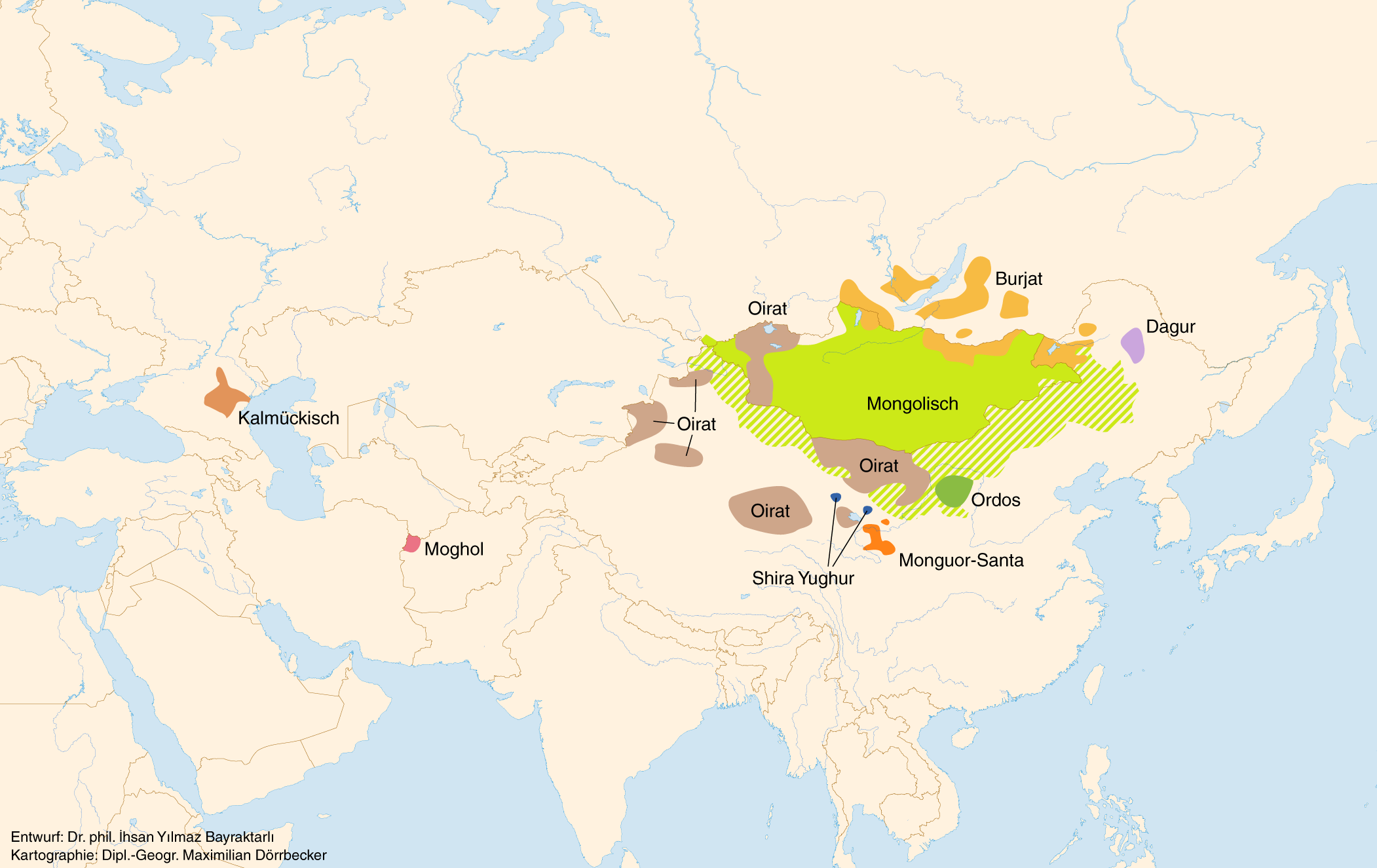
Geographic distribution of Mongolic languages

== Hypothetical ancestors ==
Hypothetical relation to other language families and their proto-languages

- Serbi–Mongolic (Donghu)
  - Para-Mongolic (all extinct)
    - Xianbei
      - Khitan
      - Tuyuhun
    - Wuhuan
  - Early Pre-Proto-Mongolic
    - Late Pre-Proto-Mongolic

== Ancestral ==
- Proto-Mongolic language

== Historical Mongolic ==
- Middle Mongol
  - Daur / Dagur
    - Nonni Daur
    - Hailar Daur
    - Amur Daur
  - Central Mongolic
    - Central Proper
      - Classical Mongolian, from approximately 1700 to 1900
        - Mongolian
          - Khalkha
            - Northern Khalkha
              - Darkhad
            - Southern Khalkha
              - Shilingol/Xilingol
              - Sönid
              - Ulaanchab
              - Alasha
              - Baarin
          - Chakhar
          - Ordos
          - Khamnigan
      - Western
        - Oirat-Kalmyk
          - Dörbet
          - Bayat
          - Torgut
          - Altai Uriankhai
          - Ööld
          - Zakhchin
          - Khoton
          - Kalmyk
      - Eastern
        - Kharchin / Khorchin
      - Northern
        - Buryat
          - Khori group
          - Alar–Tunka group
          - Ekhirit–Bulagat group
          - Bargut group
          - Lower Uda
    - Southern Mongolic (part of a Gansu–Qinghai Sprachbund)
      - Shira Yugur / Eastern Yugur
      - Shirongolic
        - Monguor
          - Mongghul
          - Mongghuor
          - Mangghuer
        - Bonan (Manegacha)
          - Tongren
          - Ñantoq Baoan
        - Transitional Bonan-Kangjia
          - Kangjia
        - Santa / Sarta (Dongxiang)
          - Suonanba
          - Wangjiaji
          - Sijiaji
    - Moghol / Mogholi (almost extinct or extinct)

== Possible Mongolic languages (all extinct) ==
Unclassified languages that may have been Mongolic or members of other language families include:

- Tabγač / Tuoba (Mongolic or Turkic language)
- Xiongnu (may have been the same as the Hunnic language)
- Pannonian Avar

== See also ==
- Mongolic languages

== Sources ==
- Andrews, Peter A. (1999). Felt tents and pavilions: the nomadic tradition and its interaction with princely tentage, Volume 1. Melisende. ISBN 978-1-901764-03-1.
- Janhunen, Juha, ed. (2003). The Mongolic languages. Routledge Language Family Series. London: Routledge. ISBN 978-0-7007-1133-8.
  - Rybatzki, Volker (2003). "Middle Mongol". In Janhunen, J. (ed.). pp. 47–82.
- Janhunen, Juha. 2012. Khitan – Understanding the language behind the scripts. SCRIPTA, Vol. 4: 107–132.
- Janhunen, Juha (2006). "Mongolic languages". In Brown, K. (ed.). The encyclopedia of language & linguistics. Amsterdam: Elsevier. pp. 231–234.
- Luvsanvandan, Š. (1959). "Mongol hel ajalguuny učir". Mongolyn Sudlal. 1.
- Nugteren, Hans (2011). Mongolic Phonology and the Qinghai-Gansu Languages (Ph.D.). Netherlands Graduate School of Linguistics / Landelijke – LOT.
- Poppe, Nicholas (1964) [1954]. Grammar of Written Mongolian. Wiesbaden: Harrassowitz.
- Sechenbaatar, Borjigin (2003). The Chakhar dialect of Mongol – A morphological description. Helsinki: Finno-Ugrian society.
- [Sechenbaatar] Sečenbaγatur, Qasgerel, Tuyaγ-a, B. ǰirannige, U Ying ǰe. (2005). Mongγul kelen-ü nutuγ-un ayalγun-u sinǰilel-ün uduridqal. Kökeqota: ÖMAKQ.
- Starostin, Sergei A.; Dybo, Anna V.; Mudrak, Oleg A. (2003). Etymological Dictionary of the Altaic Languages. Leiden: Brill.
- Svantesson, Jan-Olof; Tsendina, Anna; Karlsson, Anastasia; Franzén, Vivan (2005). The Phonology of Mongolian. New York: Oxford University Press.
- Golden, Peter B. (2011). Studies on the Peoples and Cultures of the Eurasian Steppes. Editura Academiei Române; Editura Istros a Muzeului Brăilei. ISBN 9789732721520.
- Vovin, Alexander (2005). "The end of the Altaic controversy (review of Starostin et al. 2003)". Central Asiatic Journal. 49 (1): 71–132.
- Vovin, Alexander. 2007. Once again on the Tabgač language. Mongolian Studies XXIX: 191–206.
