= Qinghai–Gansu sprachbund =

Linguistic area in northwest China

Area of the sprachbund, with shading indicating official minority designation of counties or prefectures: Hui Tibetan Tu (Monguor) Dongxiang / Bonan Salar Yugur

The Qinghai–Gansu sprachbund or Amdo sprachbund is a sprachbund in the plateau traversed by the upper Yellow River, including northeastern Qinghai and southern Gansu. This has long been an area of interaction between speakers of northwestern varieties of Mandarin Chinese, Amdo Tibetan and Mongolic and Turkic languages. These families feature contrasting typologies, which spread between languages in the region. The languages have come to share many features, and differ significantly from their relatives outside the region.

== Languages ==
The languages involved include

- Chinese
  - Hezhou, the language of the Hui people in Linxia Hui Autonomous Prefecture (Gansu) and Tongren, Xunhua, Minhe, Ledu and Datong counties of Qinghai.
  - Gangou, spoken in Minhe county (Qinghai).
  - Tangwang, spoken in northeastern Dongxiang Autonomous County (Gansu).
  - Wutun, spoken in the Upper and Lower Wutun villages, Tongren county (Qinghai).
- Tibetic
  - Amdo Tibetan, the Tibetic language of Qinghai, varies considerably across the region.
- Mongolic
  - Monguor (Tu) has two major varieties, often treated as separate languages: Mangghuer in Minhe Hui and Tu Autonomous County and Mongghul in Huzhu Tu Autonomous County.
  - Eastern Yugur, spoken in Sunan Yugur Autonomous County (Gansu)
  - Bonan (Bao'an) is spoken in Jishishan Bonan, Dongxiang and Salar Autonomous County (Gansu) and Tongren County (Qinghai).
  - Santa (Dongxiang), centred on Dongxiang Autonomous County (Gansu)
  - Kangjia, spoken in Jianzha County (Qinghai).
- Turkic
  - Salar, spoken in Xunhua county (Qinghai)
  - Western Yugur, spoken in Sunan county (Gansu)

More mainstream varieties of northwestern Mandarin are spoken in the provincial capitals, Xining and Lanzhou. All these languages are subject to a superstrate influence from Standard Mandarin.

These languages belong to families with three sharply contrasting typologies:

	Chinese	Tibetic	Mongolic and Turkic
Sentence structure	SVO	SOV	SOV
Noun phrases	Adj+N	N+Adj	Adj+N
Morphology	isolating	suffixal	suffixal
Alignment	accusative	ergative	accusative
Phonemic tone	yes	no (Note: Some Tibetic languages, including Lhasa Tibetan, have developed tonal registers, but these are absent from Amdo Tibetan.)	no

The Mandarin varieties have acquired such features as spirantized voiceless stops, SOV word order and case markers. The Wutun language of Tongren county, Qinghai, is a highly divergent Mandarin variety, with phonological and grammatical structures resembling Amdo Tibetan.

In some cases, the changes progress through the speaker population in a few decades, so that they can be observed in progress. A common pattern is to add a borrowed structure beside an indigenous structure with the same function, after which the indigenous structure loses its function and eventually disappears, leaving a changed syntactic pattern. For example, the indigenous Bonan comparative structure was N-si, where the noun N represents the standard being compared against. Bonan added the equivalent Mandarin structure, bi+N, yielding a composite bi+N-si. The original suffix was then lost, leaving a transformed syntactic pattern.
