= Serbi–Mongolic languages =

Language family of Eurasia

Serbi–Mongolic
- Mongolic–Khitan; Macro-Mongolic
- Geographic distribution: Mongolia, Northern China, Lake Baikal region
- Ethnicity: Mongolic peoples
- Linguistic classification: One of the world's primary language families
- Subdivisions: Mongolic; Para-Mongolic †

Language codes
- Glottolog: mong1349
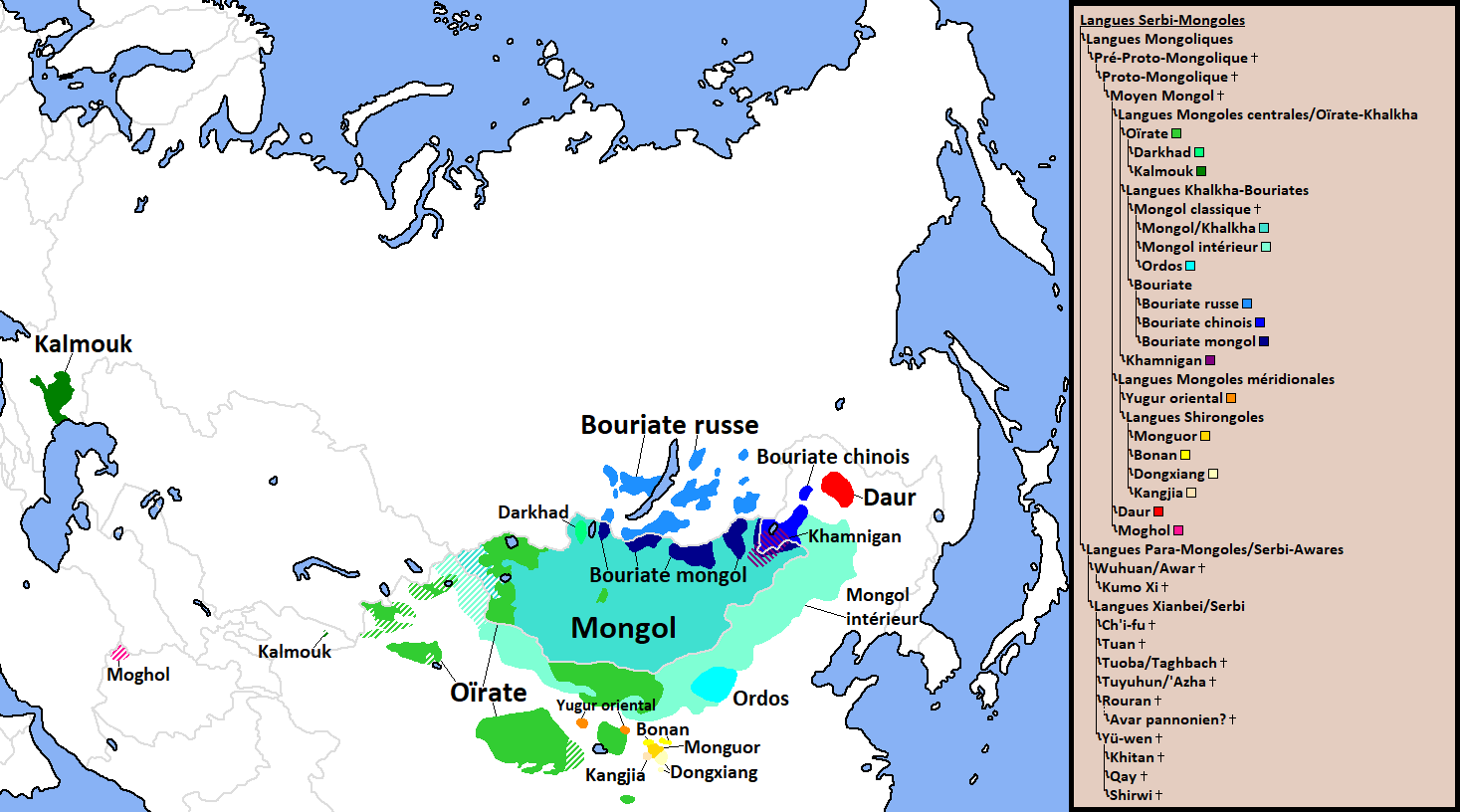
- Map of the Mongolic languages

Serbi–Mongolic (Note: also known as Mongolic–Khitan, Mongolo-Khitanic, Khitano-Mongolic and Macro-Mongolic) is a group of languages that includes the Mongolic languages as well as the Para-Mongolic languages, a group including extinct sister languages to the Mongolic language family, notably the Khitan language.

== Names ==
Serbi (*serbi) is Shimunek's reconstruction for the historical ethnonym Xianbei (鮮卑).

In Glottolog 4.4, the languages are referred to as Mongolic–Khitan.

== Languages ==
Below is a preliminary classification of the Serbi–Mongolic languages in Shimunek (2017:35):

- Serbi–Mongolic
  - Mongolic
    - Central Mongolic
      - Khalkha Mongolian
      - Khorchin Mongolian
      - Ordos Mongolian
      - Oirat
      - Buryat
      - Khamnigan Mongol
    - Southern Mongolic
      - Shira Yugur
      - Shirongolic
        - Monguor
        - Baoanic
          - Bonan
          - Kangjia
          - Santa
    - Moghol
    - Dagur
  - Serbi–Awar (= Juha Janhunen's "Para-Mongolic")
    - Awar (Avar) (Wuhuan 烏桓 or Wuwan 烏丸)
    - Old Serbi (Common Serbi)
      - Ch’i-fu/Qifu 乞伏 (northern Early Middle Chinese/NEMC *kʰɨrbuwk)
      - Tuan/Duan 段 (NEMC *dɔr̃)
      - Tabghach
      - Tuyuhun/T’u-yü-hun (Mu-jung/Murong 慕容)
      - Kitanic (Yü-wen/Yuwen 宇文)
        - Old Kitan
        - Qay 奚 (NEMC *ɣay)
        - Shirwi proper 室韋 (*širwi/*širβi < *serbi 鮮卑 'Xianbei')

== Sound changes ==
Phonological innovations from Common Serbi–Mongolic (i.e., Proto-Serbi–Mongolic) to Proto-Mongolic and Proto-Serbi are (Shimunek 2017:415):

Proto-Mongolic innovations	Proto-Serbi innovations
*p > *h	*ɔ > *a / _C_{[dorsal]}
*#ñ > *#n	*ze > *ži
*Vñ# > *Vi#	*se > *ši
*z > *s	*VbV > *Vw(V)
*wə > *ə	*wə > *ɔ

== See also ==
- Xianbei

== Sources ==
- Janhunen, Juha (2006). "Mongolic languages". In Brown, K. (ed.). The encyclopedia of language & linguistics. Amsterdam: Elsevier. pp. 231–234.
- Nugteren, Hans (2011). Mongolic Phonology and the Qinghai-Gansu Languages (Ph.D. thesis). Netherlands Graduate School of Linguistics / Landelijke – LOT.
