= Dongxiang people =

Mongolic ethnic group in China

Dongxiang
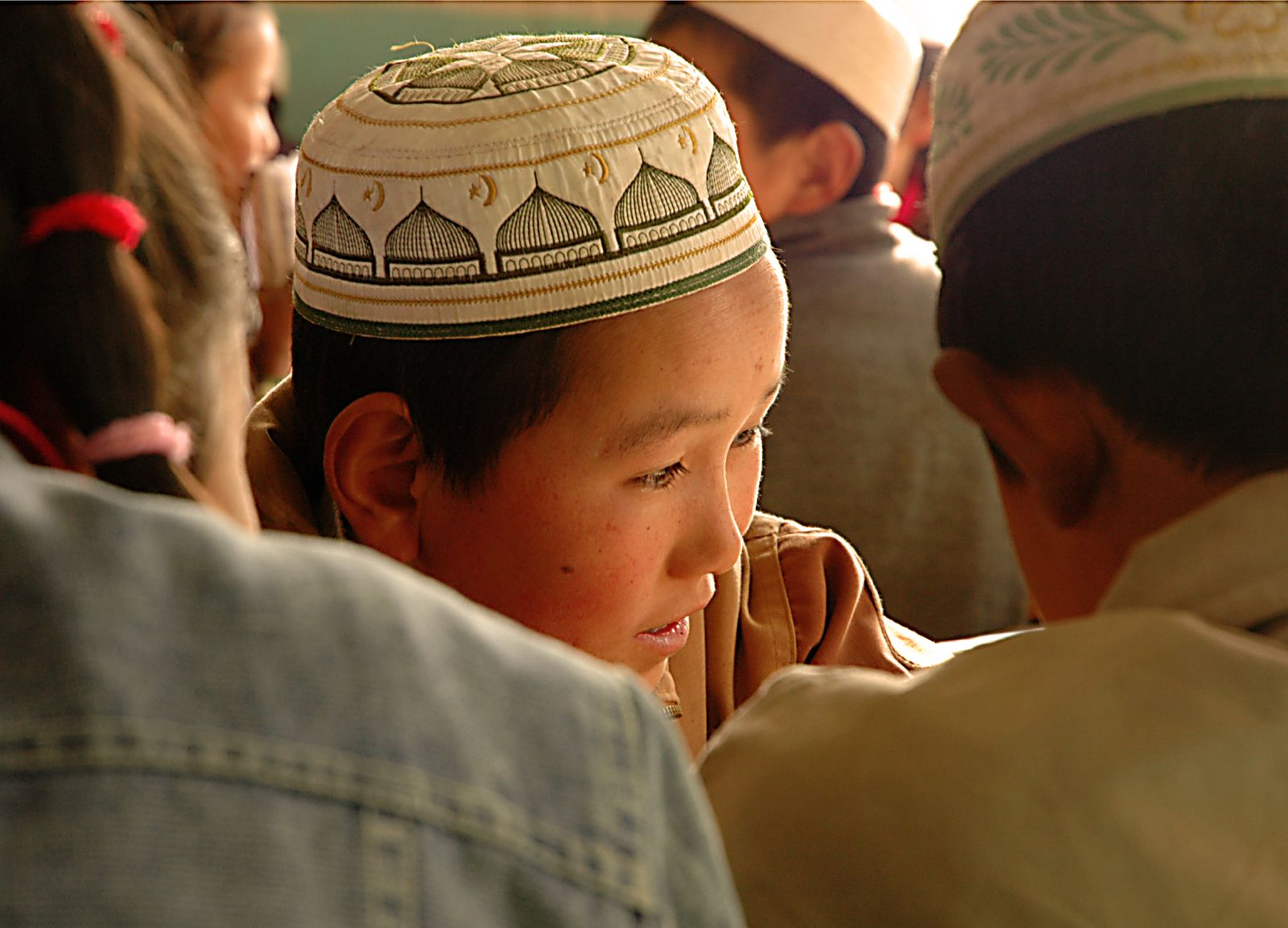
- A Dongxiang student in school

Total population
- ~775,000

Regions with significant populations
- ~775,000, according to China Statistical Yearbook 2021

Languages
- Santa, Hezhou, Tangwang, Mandarin

Religion
- Sunni Islam

Related ethnic groups
- Mongolic peoples, Hui, Bonan, Salar

Dongxiang people
- Simplified Chinese: 东乡族
- Traditional Chinese: 東鄉族
- Xiao'erjing: دْوثِيَانْ‌زُو
Transcriptions
Standard Mandarin
- Hanyu Pinyin: Dōngxiāngzú
other Mandarin
- Xiao'erjing: دْوثِيَانْ‌زُو

Sarta / Santa
- Simplified Chinese: 撒尔塔
- Traditional Chinese: 撒爾塔
Transcriptions
Standard Mandarin
- Hanyu Pinyin: Sā'ěrtǎ

The Dongxiang (autonym: Sarta or Santa) are a Mongolic people and one of 56 ethnic groups officially recognized by the People's Republic of China. Half of the population live in Dongxiang Autonomous County, Linxia Prefecture, Gansu Province, China. The rest are divided over Hezheng County, Linxia City, Lanzhou, Dingxi and Ningxia. According to the China Statistical Yearbook 2021, their population numbers 774,947, although research has found that the number is inflated due to Hui identifying themselves as Dongxiang for the census, in order to benefit from minority policies.

== History ==
Chinese historians generally agreed that Dongxiang are the descendants of Central Asians who had migrated during the Yuan dynasty. They were converted to Islam in the 1340s by a missionary named Hamzeh (哈木則, Hāmùzé). They spoke a different Central Asian language before shifting to their current mother tongue, Dongxiang language, a member of the Mongolic languages.

The name Dongxiang is derived from them living in what was called the eastern (Dong) part of Hezhou prefecture, present day Linxia.

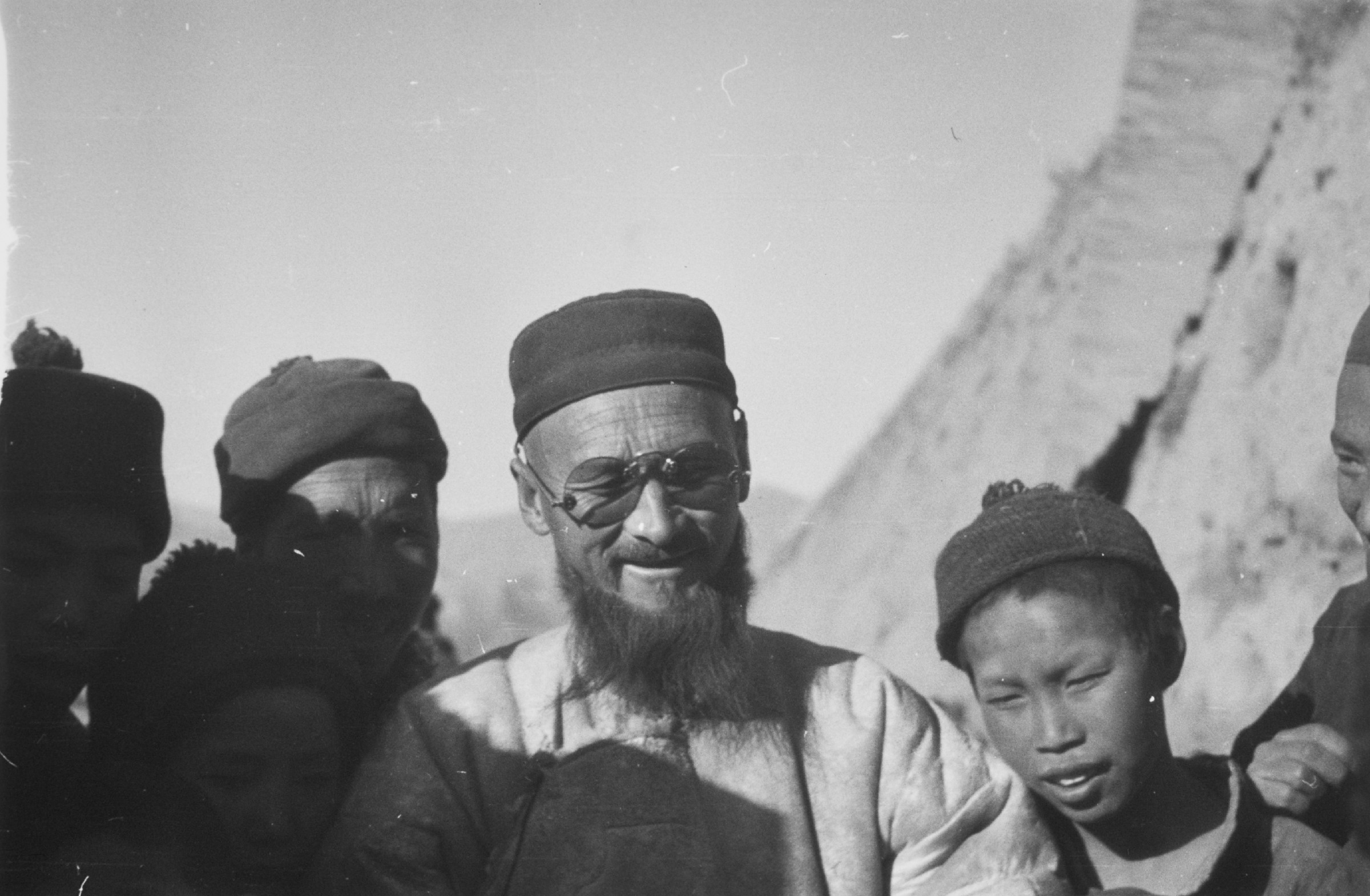
A Dongxiang Muslim elder with long beard & other Muslims. Hezhou (Linxia), Gansu, 1934.

=== Origin ===
Haplogroup analysis by Wen et al. (2013) shows that the closest relative of Dongxiang people are the common ancestors of the Kyrgyz of Kyrgyzstan and Xinjiang, the Tajiks of Khujand, Tajikistan, and the Ishkashimis of Tajikistan. The second closest relative is the Salars of Xinhua, Qinghai. The third closest relative are the commons ancestors of the Uyghurs and Tajiks of Xinjiang, the Shughnis of Tajikistan, the Bartangi of Tajikistan and various Uzbeks of different Central Asian countries.

STR analysis excluding Kyrgyz, Tajiks and other Central Asians might conclude Dongxiang is close to East Asians as a whole.

Physical anthropological analysis by Li et al. (2011) shows that the closest relative of Dongxiang men among the Chinese populations are the Tajiks in Tashkurgan, Xinjiang. The next closest relative is the common ancestor of the Mongols in Bayingolin, Xinjiang, the Salars in Xinhua, Qinghai and the Mongols in Tongliao, Inner Mongolia. The physical anthropology of Dongxiang women show her closest relative are the common ancestor of the Bonans in Jishishan, Gansu and the Oroqens in Oroqen Banner, Inner Mongolia. Her next closest relative is the common ancestors of the Monguors in Huzhu, Qinghai, the Salars in Xinhua, Qinghai and the Tajiks in Tashkurgan, Xinjiang.

Distribution of Y-chromosome haplogroups in Dongxiang:

O=24.29(O2=18.69,O1a=1.87,O1b=3.73)

J=16.82

R1=16.82(R1a=14.02,R1b=2.8)

R2=9.35

C=6.54

G=5.61

N=5.6

D=4.67

E=3.74

Others=6.56

In another study in 2010 found that the majority of the Dongxiang belonged to Haplogroup R1a (R1a : 54%).

=== Intermarriage ===
The Dongxiang have Mongol, Han Chinese, Hui and Tibetan surnames. Dongxiang with Han Chinese surnames such as Wang, Kang, Zhang, Gao and Huang claim descent from Han Chinese. Surnames such as Ma and Mu are of Hui origin.

Some Dongxiang have said that, in the rare instances that they do marry with other people, it is only with Han and Hui, but not Tibetans.

== Military history ==
In 1900, Generals Ma Fulu and Ma Fuxiang brought a Chinese Muslim troop comprising Dongxiang, Hui and Bonan to fight the foreign troops in the Boxer Rebellion. They were killed while defending the Zhengyang Gate in Beijing. In 1937–1945, General Ma Biao brought a multiethnic troop, including Dongxiang, to fight the Second Sino-Japanese War. Some claimed Ma Fuxiang himself was of a Dongxiang assimilated into the Hui Chinese.

== Economy ==
The base of the economy of Dongxiang is agriculture. The main products are potatoes, corn, barley, millet and wheat. They are also recognized craftsmen, specializing in the elaboration of traditional carpets.

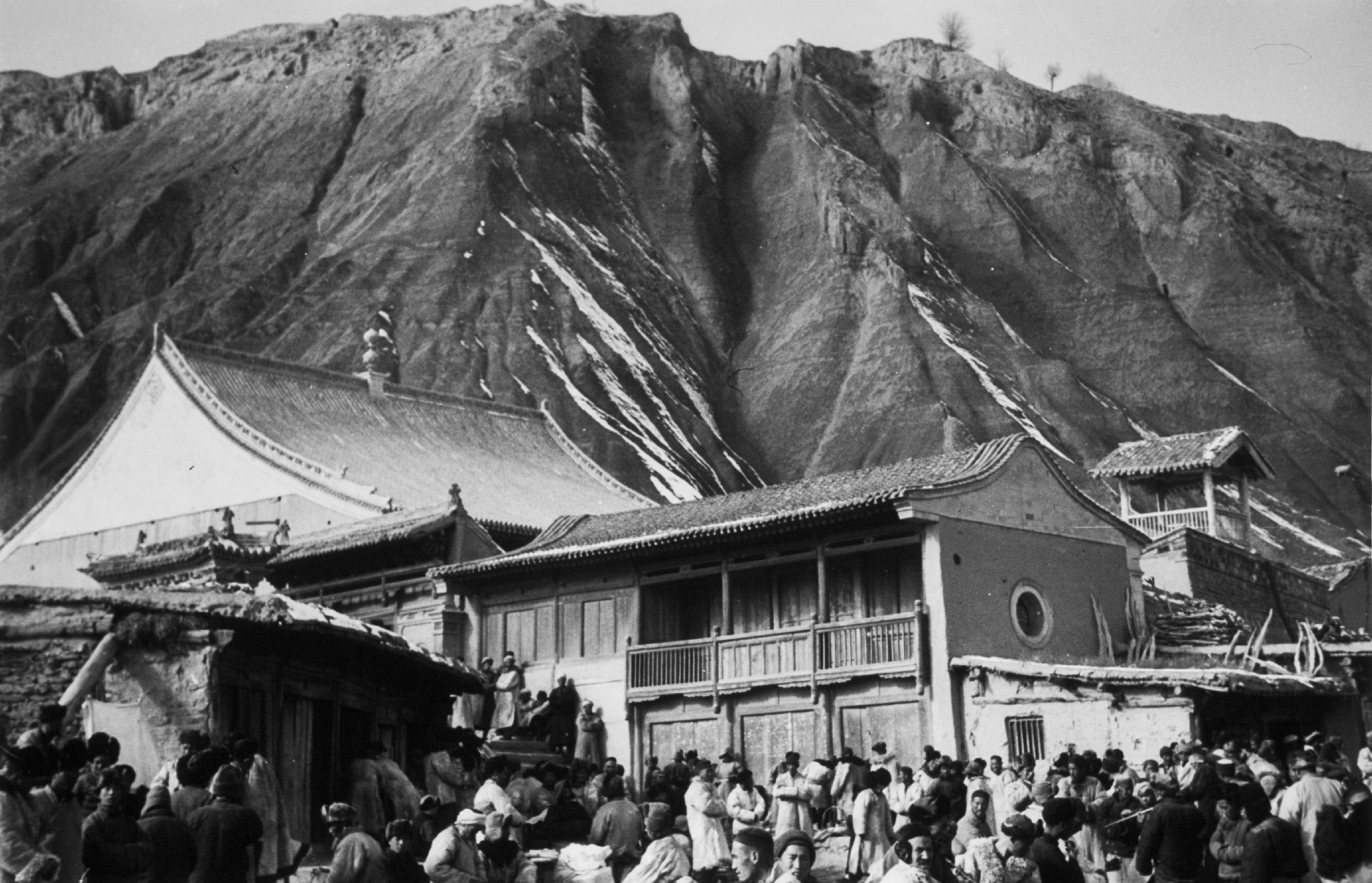
Muslims at the mosque with a minaret and market, Dongxiang County, Gansu, 1934.

== Culture ==
An early ethnography of Dongxiang was documented in 1940 by the American Asiatic Association. The author interviewed Ma Chuanyuan, a Muslim Mongol who was the magistrate of five districts, on the origins of his people. The account described them as a community of one hundred thousand, Mongol by race, Muslim by religion and Chinese by culture.

Common Dongxiang cuisine includes the use of a potato mash that is used for noodles, snacks, alcoholic drinks and more.

Traditional Dongxiang dress for men includes buttoned robes and a broad waistband. These waistbands are sometimes used to hang knives, snuff bottles, or small bags on them. A vest over a white shirt, trousers and a beret like cap makes up the rest of the traditional outfit. Seasonal clothing like sheepskin coats are also worn during the winter. Dongxiang women wear embroidered outfits which include wide sleeved shirts and trousers. Older women wear kerchiefs and younger women tend to wear bright decorated cotton caps and silk veils. On special occasions, women wear embroidered shoes with a medium heel.

== Language and education ==
The Dongxiang speak the Dongxiang language, a member of the Mongolic family. The language has distinct features resembling Middle Mongolian and has up to 35% loan words borrowed from Mandarin Chinese. The negligible words of Persian, Turkic and Arabic origin are probably remnants of their original languages before language shift to Dongxiang. The Dongxiang people also have a rich tradition of oral literature and use the Arabic alphabet.

As a result of the language shift, some 20,000 people in several villages in the Northeastern Dongxiang County now speak the so-called "Tangwang language": a creolized version of Mandarin Chinese with a strong Dongxiang influence, in particular in its grammar.

Government statistics show that the Dongxiang are among the poorest and least literate of China's minorities, with most Dongxiang having completed only an average of 1.1 years of schooling, a problem aggravated by the lack of a written language.

In 2004, the Ford Foundation provided US$30,000 in grant money for a pilot project to promote bilingual education in Mandarin and Dongxiang, in an effort to reduce school drop-out rates. The project is credited with the publication of a Dongxiang–Chinese bilingual dictionary as well as recent rises in test scores.

== Famous Dongxiang people ==
- Ma Wanfu, anti-Qing rebel and Yihewani founder
- Ma Dahan, anti-Qing rebel
