= Bonan people =

Mongolic ethnic group

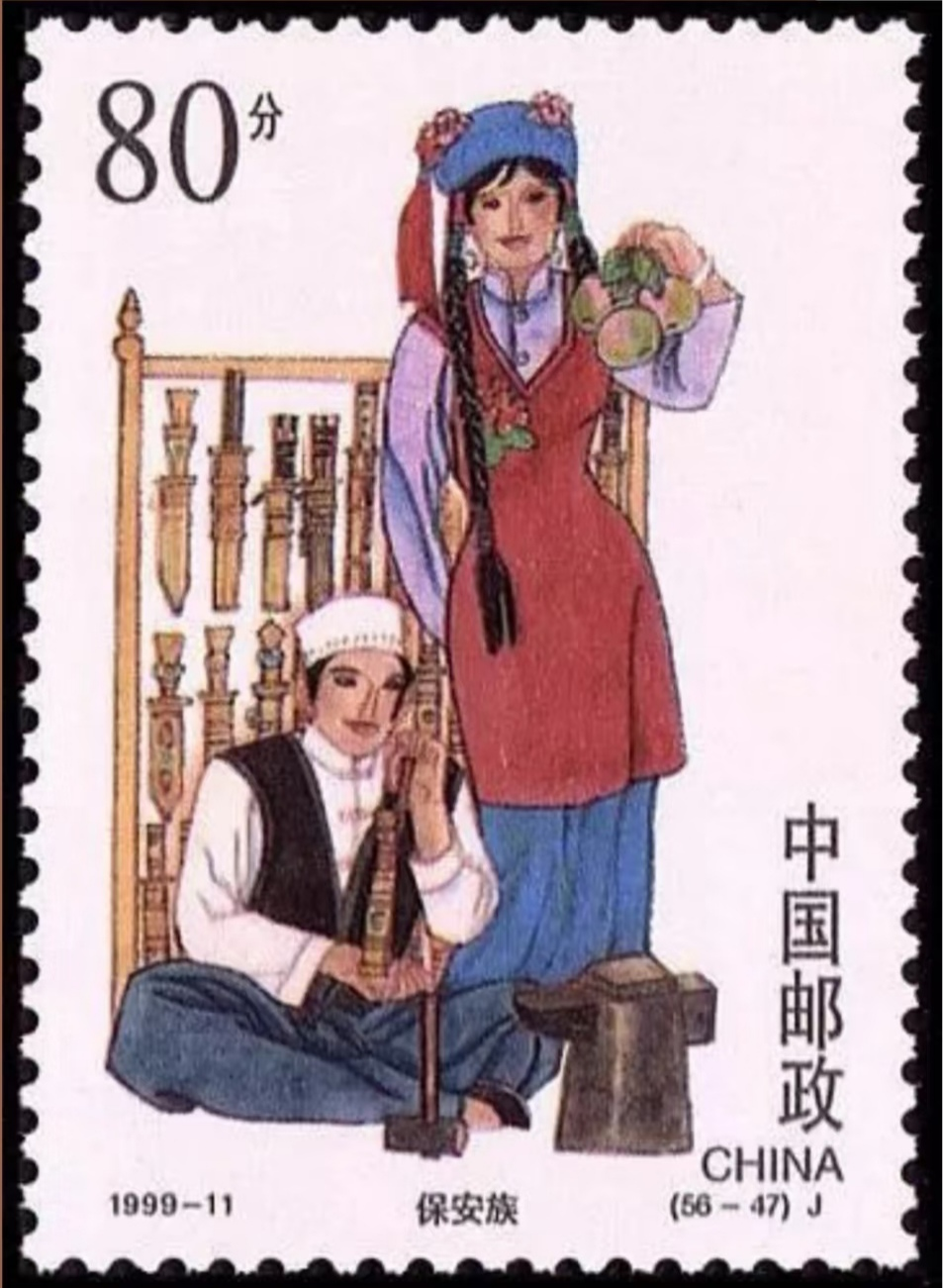

Total population
- 24,434 (2020 census)

Regions with significant populations
- China
- Gansu Province (significant): n/a
- Qinghai (small pop.): n/a

Languages
- Mandarin Chinese, Hezhou, Bonan (traditional)

Religion
- Predominantly Sunni Islam, minority Tibetan Buddhism (Qinghai)

Related ethnic groups
- Mongols, Daurs, Dongxiangs

The Bonan people (Chinese: 保安族; pinyin: Bǎo'ānzú) are an ethno-linguistic group distinct from all other Mongolic peoples, living in Gansu and Qinghai provinces in Northwestern China. They are one of the "titular nationalities" of Gansu's Jishishan Bonan, Dongxiang and Salar Autonomous County, which is located south of the Yellow River, near Gansu's border with Qinghai.

Bonan are the 10th-smallest (47th out of 56) of the ethnic groups officially recognized by the People's Republic of China. 95% of Bonan live in Jishishan County, numbering 21,400 of the county's population.

== History ==
The Bonan people are believed to be descended from Mongol and Central Asian soldiers stationed in Qinghai (around modern day Tongren County) during the Yuan dynasty. After the collapse of the Yuan dynasty, the ancestors of the Bonan stayed in the region and eventually intermingled with the surrounding Hui, Tibetan, Han, and Monguor peoples, which would contribute to the emergence of the modern Bonans.

The ancestors of the Bonan people were Tibetan Buddhists, and it is known that around 1585 they lived in Tongren County (in Amdo Region; presently, in Qinghai Province), north of the Tibetan Rebgong Monastery. It was in that year that the town of Bao'an was founded in that area. Later on, some of the members of the Bonan-speaking community converted to Islam and moved north, to Xunhua County. It is said that they have been converted to Islam by the Hui Sufi master Ma Laichi (1681?–1766). Later, in the aftermath of the Dungan Rebellion (1862–1874) the Muslim Bonans moved farther east, into what's today Jishishan Bonan, Dongxiang and Salar Autonomous County of Gansu Province.

Hui, Baoan and Dongxiang troops served under Generals Ma Fulu and Ma Fuxiang in the Boxer Rebellion, defeating the invading Eight Nation Alliance at the Battle of Langfang. Hui, Baoan, Dongxiang, Salar and Tibetan troops served under Ma Biao in the Second Sino-Japanese War against the Japanese.

It were the members of this Muslim part of the original Bonan community who are officially recognized as the separate "Bonan" ethnic group in today's PRC. Their brethren who have remained Buddhist and stayed in Tongren, are now officially classified as part of the Monguor (Tu) ethnic group, even though they speak essentially the same Bonan language. The official concept of the "Bonan ethnic group" still remains somewhat artificial for the Bonans themselves.

Nowadays Bonan are concentrated in the villages of Ganhetan, Meipo and Dadun in Jishishan County.

== Language ==
Both the Muslim Bonans in Gansu and their Buddhist cousins in Qinghai (officially classified as Monguor) have historically spoken the Bonan language, a Mongolic language. The Buddhist Monguor of Qinghai speak a slightly different dialect than the Muslim Bonan of Gansu. Whereas the Bonan language of Gansu has undergone Chinese influences, the Bonan language of Qinghai has been influenced by Tibetan. The language is also closely related to archaic versions of Mongolian.

There are 11 vowels in the Bonan language, as well as many compound vowels and there are 26 consonants, 5 of which are unstable.

They have no script for their language.

The Muslim Gansu Bonans are more numerous than their Buddhist Qinghai cousins (the estimates for the two groups were around 12,200 (in 1990) and around 3,500 (in 1980), respectively). However, it has been observed that in Gansu the use of Bonan language is declining (in favor of the local version – the "Hezhou dialect" – of Mandarin Chinese), while in Qinghai the language keeps being transmitted to younger generations.

== Genetics ==
Distribution of Y-chromosome haplogroups in Bonan:

- O=23.43(O2=20.31,O1a=1.56,O1b=1.56)
- J=18.75
- R1=14.07(R1a=10.94,R1b=3.13)
- C=9.37
- N=9.17
- R2=6.25
- D=6.25
- I=4.69
- Others=8.02

In another study in 2010 found:

- K*=22.2
- O1b=18.5
- D*=14.8
- O2=14.8
- O*=7.4
- R1a=7.4
- R2=7.4
- N=3.7
- R1b=3.7

== Culture ==
The Bonan share many traditions with the Dongxiang and Hui. Their traditional dress includes elements of Tibetan, Hui and Dongxiang clothing. Married Bonan women wear black veils, while unmarried women wear green veils. Women wear more colorful dress, including trousers with colored cuffs. Bonan men typically wear black or white skullcaps and white or dark blue jackets. Fur-lined jackets are used during the winter.

The economy of the Bonan consists of farming (mainly wheat and rye), raising livestock, selling local handicrafts and working in the lumber industry. Bonan are especially known for the knife production, with their surrounding areas are rich in copper deposits. Over 620 Bonan knife crafters produce 400,000 knives annually. During the Cultural Revolution, knife making tools were confiscated, but Bonan continued producing knives in secret, upholding their skills. In 2006, Bonan knife making was added to Intangible Cultural Heritage of China list.

Popular pastimes for the Bonan include horse-riding, wrestling, and archery. The Bonan also enjoy poetry, singing, dancing and playing traditional Chinese instruments. Majority of the Bonan are Muslim. A small minority of Bonans are Tibetan Buddhists that reside in Qinghai, but they have been largely acculturated to neighboring ethnic groups.

The Bonan in Jishishan county follow a halal diet consisting mainly of beef and mutton, combined with carrots, potatoes and glass noodles. They also enjoy drinking tea. Bonan traditional villages have the roofs of the houses connected, in a way allowing the villagers to walk between houses over the roofs. However these traditional houses are rare nowadays.
