= Monguor =

Mongour, formerly also various names including Tu and Dchiahour, may refer to:

- Monguor people
- Monguor language
