= Nao Klao language =

Hmongic language of China

Nao Klao
- Baonao
- Native to: China
- Region: Guangxi; Libo County, Guizhou
- Ethnicity: Yao
- Native speakers: (28,952 cited 2001)
- Language family: Hmong–Mien: Hmongic; West Hmongic; Bu–Nao; Nao Klao

Language codes
- ISO 639-3: –
- Glottolog: naog1238

Nao Klao (Naogelao) or Baonao is a Hmongic language of southern China.

== Varieties ==
According to Meng (2001), Baonao 包瑙 (Nao Klao, Naogelao 瑙格劳, autonyms: pou33 nou22, [tɔ11] m̥ɔu11 tlou11) has 28,952 speakers in Nandan, Hechi, and Tian'e in Guangxi as well as Libo County, Guizhou. The representative dialect in Meng (2001) is that of Lihu Township 里湖瑶族乡, Nandan County 南丹县, Guangxi.

Beidongnuo 被动诺, with 244 speakers (as of 1984) in Libo County, Guizhou, is likely a variety of Nagelao (Nao Klao). It was identified as Dongmeng by Bradley (2007).
