= Hezhou language =

Mixed language spoken in China

Hezhou
- Native to: China
- Region: Linxia Hui Autonomous Prefecture (approximating the former Hezhou Prefecture), Gansu Province
- Language family: Western Yugur-based creole, or Western Yugur–Mandarin mixed language

Language codes
- ISO 639-3: None (mis)
- Glottolog: hezh1244

Hezhou (Chinese: 河州话; pinyin: Hézhōuhuà), also known as Linxia (Chinese: 临夏方言; pinyin: Línxià fāngyán), is a creolized mixed language spoken in Gansu Province, China. It has been the lingua franca of Linxia (formerly Hezhou) for several centuries.

Earlier scholars such as Mei Lee-Smith and Stephen A. Wurm, proposed that it is based on Western Yugur and perhaps Salar and has been relexified by Mandarin Chinese, so that nearly all roots are of Chinese origin, but grammatically it remains a Turkic language, with six noun cases, agglutinative morphology and an SOV word order. Under this statement, the language is thought to be originated from a Turkic language and replaced all of its vocabulary with Mandarin Chinese. However, modern linguists argue that Hezhou is fundamentally a Sinitic language that experienced language contact induced change. Dwyer demonstrated that the dialect consistently retains native Sinitic phonological and lexical features while undergoing heavy morphosyntactic interference from neighboring Altaic and Bodic languages. Tetsuya Kawasumi also notes that neither Uyghur nor Western Yugur speaking population inhabited the core Hezhou region. Instead, Kawasumi attributes the dialect change to the language contact during the mid-to-late Qing Dynasty.

Grammatical suffixes are either Turkic or Chinese in origin; in the latter case they have been divorced from their original function and bear little to no relation to Chinese semantics. The phonology is largely Chinese, with three tones, though Hezhou tone sandhi is unusual from a Chinese perspective. It may be that Hezhou tone differs among ethnic Chinese, Hui, Dongxiang and Bao'an speakers, though there is no indication that such differences occur among native speakers.

Hezhou was once thought to be a Chinese language that had undergone heavy Turkic influence with an ongoing loss of tone; it is now believed to be the opposite, with tone acquisition perhaps ongoing.

== Phonology ==
Apart from traditional descriptions of the Hezhou dialect’s tones, recent linguistics studies find that the dialect has developed a simpler two tones system in some local areas, mainly the old Bafang Hui vernacular of Linxia Old Town. This change comes from the merging of different historical tone categories.

In addition, the dialect has a unique sound change for small or affectionate expressions, known as rhyme modification (a local equivalent of erhua). When people repeat nouns or adjectives to describe small things, the last syllable changes its vowel sound, most commonly by dropping nasal endings; take the following sentences for example.

1. Nasal ending loss and vowel shift for reduplicated nouns:
  (1) gùngùn (棍棍, ‘small stick’): The original nasalized syllable kuə̃ shifts in the second syllable. The final nasal tail drops entirely, and the vowel shifts to an oral /kuei/, pronounced as kuə̃ kuei.
  (2) tántán (坛坛, ‘small jar’): The nasal ending is deleted with a simple vowel alternation. The first syllable is tʰæ (with nasalization), and the second syllable shifts to an oral vowel /tʰɛ/.
2. Diminutive adjective modification:
  (1) nènnènde (嫩嫩的, ‘tender/soft’): The first syllable is a nasalized nẽ, while the second shifts to an oral vowel /nei/, pronounced as nẽ nei ti.

== Grammar ==
=== Sentence Structure ===
The main sentence order of Hezhou is SOV (subject-Object-Verb), which is different from standard Mandarin Chinese’s sentence structure SVO (Subject-Verb-Object). Nonetheless, the Mandarin Chinese sentence order SVO is still used in Hezhou, especially for general and unspecific objects and in fixed sayings as shown in the following sentences.

1. Unspecified objects and fixed expressions

When the object is general or part of the habitual verb-object collocation, Hezhou typically remains the original Mandarin Chinese word order. The common expressions are shown as follows.

(1) chī fàn (吃饭, ‘to eat food’)
(2) xǐ yī (洗衣, ‘to wash clothes’)
(3) kàn shū (看书, ‘to read books’)
(4) shuō huà (说话, ‘to speak [words]’)

2. specific objects

when the object has a specific reference, the object is usually fronted to form a SOV structure sentence.

我 你 啊 看 来 了
Wǒ nǐ a kàn lái le
I you ACC see come PERF
‘I have come to see you.’

(Note the addition of the accusative marker a 啊 after the fronted specific object ‘you’).

However, the SVO sentence is still widely accepted and used interchangeably.

我 看 你 来 了
Wǒ kàn nǐ lái le
I look you.ACC come PERF
‘I have come to see you.’

=== Case marker ===
The Hezhou dialect employs a complete set of postpositional case markers and unique sentence structures to show grammatical relationships, reflecting a deep structural convergence with Altaic and Bodic languages.

1 Accusative and Dative Cases (ha 哈 or a 啊):

These two markers indicate direct (accusative) or indirect objects (dative). They evolved syntactically from Chinese topic markers and are core functional particles in Hezhou.

我 他 哈 勸 了 半天
Wǒ tā ha quàn le bàntiān
I him ACC persuade PERF long.time
‘I persuaded him for a long time.’

你 客人們 哈 說 給 下
Nǐ kèrenmen ha shuō gěi xià
you guest.PL DAT say give tentative
‘You tell the guests’

2. Instrumental and Comitative Cases (la 啦 or liangge 兩個):

This structural pattern is borrowed from Altaic languages, while the phonetic forms are originally from Sinitic language.They indicate the tool of an action or accompanying people respectively.

眼睛 la 看
Yǎnjing la kàn
Eye INST look
‘Look with your eyes’

我 筆 兩個 寫 去
Wǒ bǐ liangge xiě qù
I pen INST write go
‘I use a pen to write.’

我 你 啦 蘭州 浪 走
Wǒ nǐ la Lánzhōu làng zǒu
I you COM Lanzhou wander go
‘I will go to Lanzhou to hang out with you.’

3. Ablative Case (ta):

This word is used as a postposition to show the origin, source, or movement from a place.

北京 ta 回來 了
Běijīng ta huílái le
Beijing ABL return PERF
‘Returned from Beijing.’

4. Unique Possessive Construction:

The Hezhou has a unique possessive construction, which is heavily influenced by neighboring non-Chinese languages. It uses the pattern Possessor (Noun/Pronoun) + Dative marker + have.

我哈 錢 沒有
Nga/Ya qián méiyǒu
I.DAT money not.have
‘I have no money’

In this sentence, the possessor 'I' (wǒ) fuses with the dative marker ha to become nga or ya before the verb 'have'.

== History ==
Hezhou language began to form in the Yuan dynasty. At that time, a large number of speakers of Mongolian and Turkic languages entered the Hezhou area, and some elements of those languages were mixed with Mandarin Chinese. Studies suggest that Hezhou was also influenced by the Tibetan and Monguor languages.

Starting in the late 1970s, linguists began to research the Hezhou language. It is unknown if the language was studied before that.

Some modern researchers put forward a new opinion on the dialect’s formation. They believe that its core grammatical structure was not finalized in the Yuan Dynasty but mainly formed in the mid-to-late Qing Dynasty. During this period, the decline of the local chieftain system removed regional communication barriers.

Because of the decline, many Monguor and Tibetan people started to communicate with Han people and gradually underwent language shift to Mandarin. This extensive bilingual contact and language replacement triggered widespread structural borrowing, enabling the Hezhou dialect to acquire numerous non-Sinitic grammatical features typical of Altaic and Tibetan languages.

== Abbreviation ==
ACC = Accusative case (direct object marker)

ABL = Ablative case (source / movement-from marker)

COM = Comitative case (accompaniment marker)

DAT = Dative case (indirect object / possessor marker)

INST = Instrumental case (tool / means marker)

PERF = Perfect aspect (completed action)

PL = Plural number

SG = Singular number

1 = First person
