= BWX =

BWX or bwx may refer to:

- BWX Technologies, a supplier of nuclear components and fuel to the United States
- BWX, the IATA code for Banyuwangi International Airport, Java Island, Indonesia
- bwx, the ISO 639-3 code for Bu–Nao languages, China
