= Shirongol languages =

Shirongolic
- Southeast Mongolian; Dolot; Shirongol
- Geographic distribution: China (Gansu, Qinghai)
- Linguistic classification: Mongolic: Southern; Shirongolic
- Subdivisions: Baoanic • Bonan • Kangjia • Santa; Monguor

Language codes
- Glottolog: shir1260
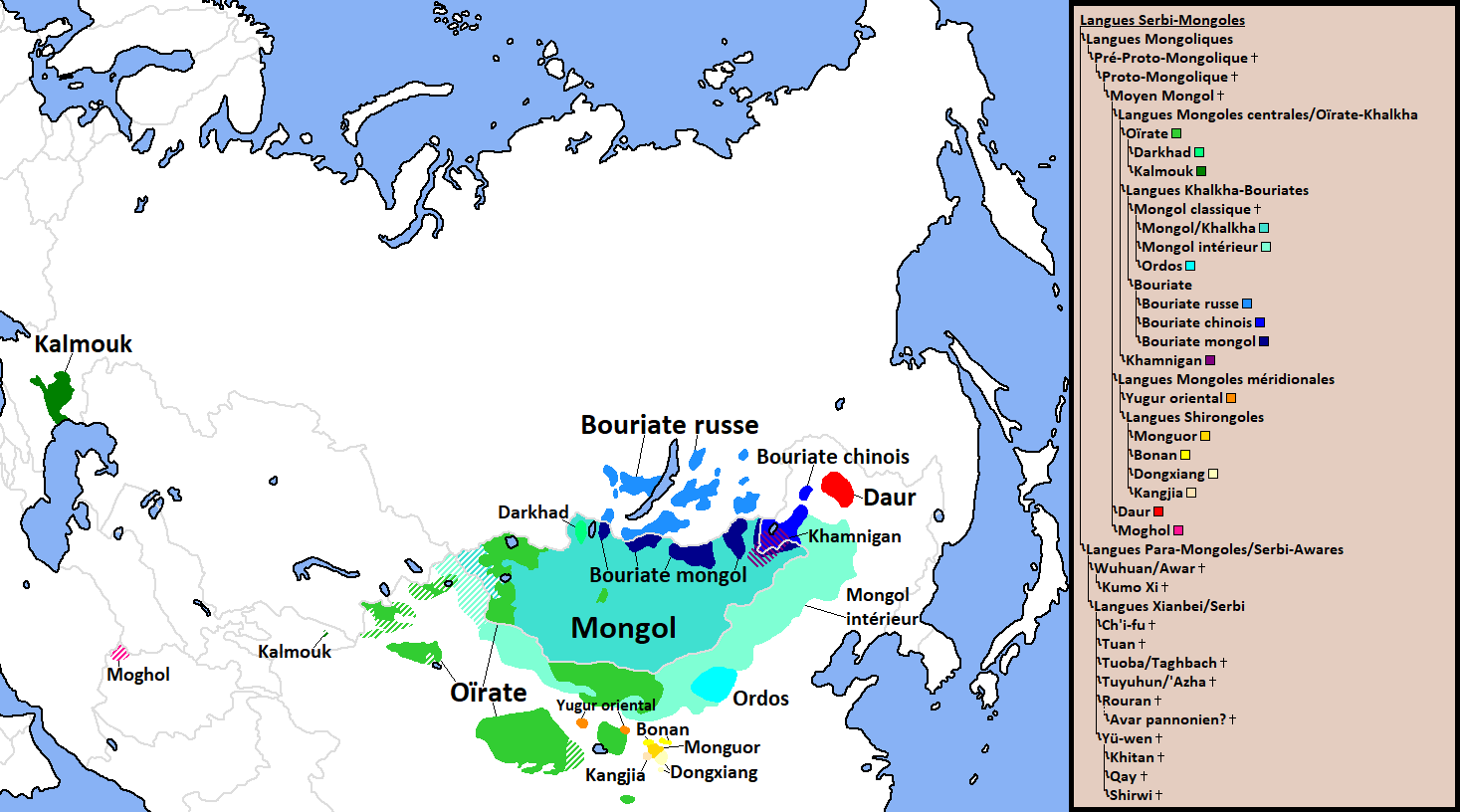
- Map of Mongolic languages. Shirongol languages are in yellow.

The Shirongol, Shirongolic or Southeast Mongolian (or more rarely, the Dolot languages) are a subgroup of the Mongolic languages in the Southern Mongolian subgroup. They are spoken in the Gansu and Qinghai provinces in China.

== History ==
It is possible that Proto-Shirongolic and Eastern Yugur were separated between the 14th and 16th centuries. The Shirongolic languages separated in the 16th century. Since then, they have been retreating in favor of Mandarin.

== Characteristics ==
Contrary to the Central Mongolic languages and Moghol, the Southern Mongolic languages (and therefore Shirongol) and Daur are not synharmonic, according to Janhunen. The Shirongolic languages have been strongly influenced by Mandarin and the Tibetan languages. Like all Mongolic languages, their word order is SOV, have agglutinative morphology and have vowel harmony.

== Internal classification ==
The Shirongolic family groups together the Bonan, Dongxiang, Kangjia and Monguor languages. Glottolog separates the Mongghul and Mangghuer dialects into separate languages and proposes the Baoanic and Monguoric groups. Dialects are indicated in italic.

Shirongol
  - Baoanic
    - Bonan
      - Jishishan
      - Tongren
      - Wutun (mixed Bonan-Mandarin)
    - Dongxiang/Santa
      - Sijiaji
      - Suonanba
      - Wangjiaji
      - Tangwang (mixed Santa-Mandarin)
    - Kangjia
  - Monguor/Monguoric/Tu languages
    - Mongghuer
    - Mongghul

Ethnologue does not use this classification. It instead groups the southern Mongolian languages in a "Mongour" group.

- Mongour languages
  - Bonan [peh]
  - Dongxiang [sce]
  - Kangjia [kxs]
  - Tu [mjg]
  - Eastern Yugur[yuy]

== See also ==
- Mongolic languages

== Bibliography ==
- Juha Janhunen (2003). The Mongolic languages. London: Routledge. ISBN 978-1-135-79690-7.
- Juha Janhunen (2006). Mongolic languages. Amsterdam: Elsevier.
- Lee-Smith, Mei W.; Wurm, Stephen A. (1996), "The Wutun language", in Wurm, Stephen A.; Mühlhäusler, Peter; Tyron, Darrell T. (eds.), Atlas of languages of intercultural communication in the Pacific, Asia, and the Americas, Volume 2, Part 1. (Volume 13 of Trends in Linguistics, Documentation Series), Walter de Gruyter, ISBN 3-11-013417-9, "International Council for Philosophy and Humanistic Studies, North China: Intercultural communications involving languages other than Chinese"
- Rybatzki, Volker. 2003. "Intra-Mongolic taxonomy." In Janhunen, Juha (ed). The Mongolic Languages, 364-390. Routledge Language Family Series 5. London: Routledge.
