= Numao language =

Hmongic language of China

Numao
- Native to: China
- Region: Libo County, Guizhou
- Ethnicity: Yao
- Native speakers: (1,715 cited 2001)
- Language family: Hmong–Mien: Hmongic; West Hmongic; Bu–Nao; Numao
- Dialects: Numao; Dongmeng; Doumu

Language codes
- ISO 639-3: –
- Glottolog: numa1251

Numao is a Hmongic language of China.

== Varieties ==
Meng (2001) lists the following language varieties for Numao.

- Numao 努茂 (Nu Mhou, autonym: nu22 m̥ou11) - 1,715 speakers in Libo County, Guizhou; representative dialect: Yaolu Township, Libo County 荔波瑶麓瑶族乡
  - Numao 努茂 (Nu Mhou, White-Trouser Yao 白裤瑶, autonym: nu22 m̥ou11) - about 1,200 speakers in the townships of Yaolu 瑶麓 and Jiarong 佳荣
  - Dongmeng 冬孟 (Long-Shirt Yao 长衫瑶, autonym: toŋ11 nu22, toŋ11 m̥uŋ11) - about 400 speakers in the townships of Maolan 茂兰, Dongtang 洞塘, and Weng'ang 翁昂

Zhou (2013:29) lists the following three varieties of Numao and also provides 400-word vocabulary lists for them.

- White-Trouser Yao 白裤瑶 (autonym: təu51 m̥o33) in Yaoshan Township 瑶山乡
- Green Yao 青瑶 (autonym: mu51 m̥ɑu33) in Yaolu Township 瑶麓乡
- Long-Shirt Yao 长衫瑶 (autonym: tən33 m̥o55) in Yaozhai 瑶寨, Dongtang Township 洞塘乡

The Guizhou Province Gazetteer (2002) lists the following autonyms for these villages in Libo County, Guizhou.

- nu55 m̥au33: Yaolu 瑶麓
- təu55 m̥u55: Yaoshan 瑶山
- tuŋ33 m̥uŋ33: Yao'ai 瑶埃
