= Gangou language =

Mandarin Chinese dialect of Qinghai, China

Gangou
- 甘沟话 / 甘溝語
- Native to: China
- Region: Minhe County, Qinghai
- Native speakers: (unclear; 12,000 residents of Gangou township cited 1990)
- Language family: Sino-Tibetan: Sinitic; Chinese; Mandarin; Central Plains; Gangou

Language codes
- ISO 639-3: None (mis)
- Glottolog: gang1272

Gangou (Chinese: 甘沟话; pinyin: Gāngōuhuà) is a variety of Mandarin Chinese that has been strongly influenced by Monguor (Mongol) and Amdo (Tibetan). It is representative of Chinese varieties spoken in rural Qinghai that have been influenced by neighboring minority languages.

Gangou Mandarin is spoken in Minhe Hui and Tu Autonomous County, at the very eastern tip of Qinghai, an area of the Gansu–Qinghai Sprachbund with a large minority population, and where even today Han Chinese were a minority in close contact with their neighbors. Many of the local Han may actually have little Chinese ancestry. The dialect has a number of common words borrowed from Monguor, as well as kinship terms from Monguor and Tibetan. Some syntactic structures, such as an SOV word order and direct objects marked by a postposition, have parallels in Monguor and to a lesser extent Tibetan.

There are also phonological differences from Standard Mandarin, though it is not clear whether these are shared by local Mandarin dialects not so strongly influenced by minority languages. For example, Standard y and w are pronounced [z] and [v], so yi 'one' is [zi] while wu 'five' and wang 'king' are [vu] and [vã]. There is no distinction between final -n and -ng: both are replaced by a nasal vowel. The consonants represented by j, q, x in pinyin do not exist; they are replaced by z, c, s before i and by g, k, h elsewhere, at least in some cases reflecting their historical origin. Thus 解 jiě 'untie' is pronounced gai, like Cantonese gaai², and 鞋 xié 'shoe' is pronounced hai, like Cantonese haai⁴.
