= Mongolic languages =

Language family of Eurasia

Mongolic
- Geographic distribution: Mongolia, Inner Mongolia (China), Buryatia and Kalmykia (Russia), Herat Province (Afghanistan) and Issyk-Kul Region (Kyrgyzstan)
- Ethnicity: Mongolic peoples
- Linguistic classification: Serbi–Mongolic: Mongolic
- Proto-language: Proto-Mongolic
- Subdivisions: Central Mongolic (including Mongolian); Southern Mongolic; Dagur; Moghol; ?Rouran †

Language codes
- ISO 639-5: xgn
- Glottolog: mong1329
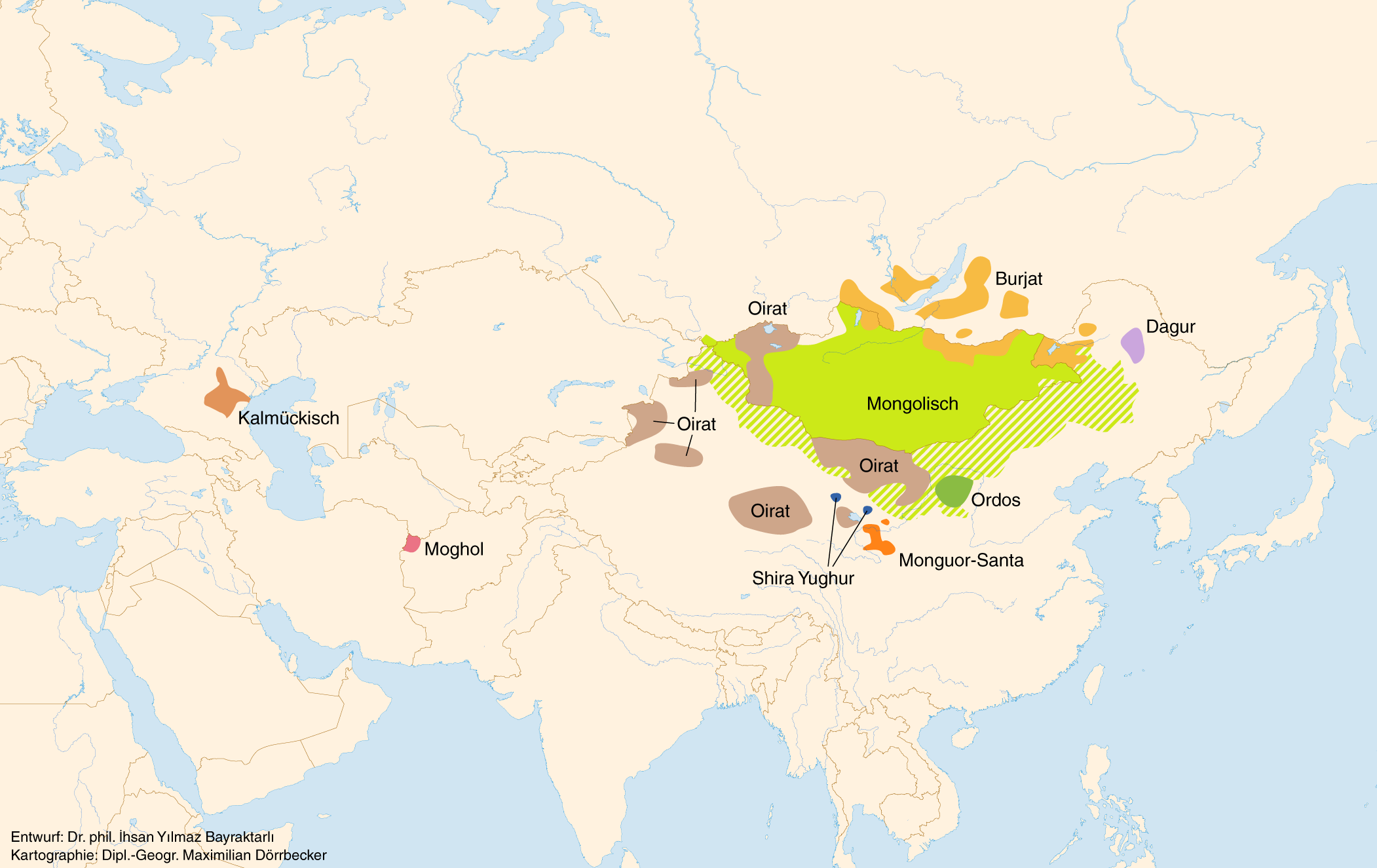
- Geographic distribution of the Mongolic languages

The Mongolic languages are a language family spoken by the Mongolic peoples in North Asia, East Asia, Central Asia, and Eastern Europe mostly in Mongolia and surrounding areas and in Kalmykia and Buryatia. The best-known member of this language family, Mongolian, is the primary language of most of the residents of Mongolia and the Mongol residents of Inner Mongolia, with an estimated 5.7+ million speakers.

== History ==
A timeline-based graphical representation of the Mongolic and Para-Mongolic languages

The possible precursor to Mongolic is the Xianbei language, heavily influenced by the Proto-Turkic (later, the Lir-Turkic) language.

The stages of historical Mongolic are:

- Pre-Proto-Mongolic, from approximately the 4th century AD until the 12th century AD, influenced by Shaz-Turkic.
- Proto-Mongolic, from approximately the 13th century, spoken around the time of Chinggis Khan.
- Middle Mongol, from the 13th century until the early 15th century or late 16th century, depending on classification spoken. (Given the almost entire lack of written sources for the period in between, an exact cutoff point cannot be established.) Again influenced by Turkic.
- Classical Mongolian, from approximately 1700 to 1900.
- Standard Mongolian The standard Mongolian language has been in official use since 1919, and this form of the language is used in the economic, political, and social fields.

=== Pre-Proto-Mongolic ===
Pre-Proto-Mongolic is the name for the stage of Mongolic that precedes Proto-Mongolic. Proto-Mongolic can be clearly identified chronologically with the language spoken by the Mongols during Genghis Khan's early expansion in the 1200-1210s. Pre-Proto-Mongolic, by contrast, is a continuum that stretches back indefinitely in time. It is divided into Early Pre-Proto-Mongolic and Late Pre-Proto-Mongolic.

Late Pre-Proto-Mongolic refers to the Mongolic spoken a few centuries before Proto-Mongolic by the Mongols and neighboring tribes like the Merkits and Keraits. Certain archaic words and features in Written Mongolian go back past Proto-Mongolic to Late Pre-Proto-Mongolic (Janhunen 2006).

Juha Janhunen argues that Mongolic languages originated in Western Manchuria, and split early on from the Para-Mongolic languages such as Khitan and Tabgach when Mongolic speakers (likely the Shiwei recorded in historical annals) spread from their original homeland in the West Liao River basin to Northwestern Manchuria, near the historically-attested Mongol homeland. Furthermore, Altaic peoples were found to have primary Ancient Northeast Asian (ANA) Neolithic ancestry from the Amur region, supporting a theory of their origins from the Amur and surrounding regions.

=== Relationship with Turkic ===
Pre-Proto-Mongolic has borrowed various words from Turkic languages.

In the case of Early Pre-Proto-Mongolic, certain loanwords in the Mongolic languages point to early contact with Oghur (Pre-Proto-Bulgaric) Turkic, also known as r-Turkic. These loanwords precede Common Turkic (z-Turkic) loanwords and include:

- Mongolic ikere (twins) from Pre-Proto-Bulgaric ikir (versus Common Turkic ekiz)
- Mongolic hüker (ox) from Pre-Proto-Bulgaric hekür (Common Turkic öküz)
- Mongolic jer (weapon) from Pre-Proto-Bulgaric jer (Common Turkic yäz)
- Mongolic biragu (calf) versus Common Turkic buzagu
- Mongolic siri- (to smelt ore) versus Common Turkic siz- (to melt)

The above words are thought to have been borrowed from Oghur Turkic during the time of the Xiongnu.

Later Turkic peoples in Mongolia all spoke forms of Common Turkic (z-Turkic) as opposed to Oghur (Bulgharic) Turkic, which withdrew to the west in the 4th century. The Chuvash language, spoken by 1 million people in European Russia, is the only living representative of Oghur Turkic which split from Proto Turkic around the 1st century AD.

Words in Mongolic like dayir (brown, Common Turkic yagiz) and nidurga (fist, Common Turkic yudruk) with initial *d and *n versus Common Turkic *y are sufficiently archaic to indicate loans from an earlier stage of Oghur (Pre-Proto-Bulgaric). This is because Chuvash and Common Turkic do not differ in these features despite differing fundamentally in rhotacism-lambdacism (Janhunen 2006). Oghur tribes lived in the Mongolian borderlands before the 5th century, and provided Oghur loanwords to Early Pre-Proto-Mongolic before Common Turkic loanwords.

=== Proto-Mongolic ===
Proto-Mongolic, the ancestor language of the modern Mongolic languages, is very close to Middle Mongol, the language spoken at the time of Genghis Khan and the Mongol Empire. Most features of modern Mongolic languages can thus be reconstructed from Middle Mongol. An exception would be the voice suffix like -caga- 'do together', which can be reconstructed from the modern languages but is not attested in Middle Mongol.

The languages of the historical Donghu, Wuhuan, and Xianbei peoples might have been related to Proto-Mongolic. For Tabghach, the language of the founders of the Northern Wei dynasty, for which the surviving evidence is very sparse, and Khitan, for which evidence exists that is written in the two Khitan scripts (large and small) which have as yet not been fully deciphered, a direct affiliation to Mongolic can now be taken to be most likely or even demonstrated.

=== Middle Mongol ===
The changes from Proto-Mongolic to Middle Mongol are described below.

==== Changes in phonology ====
===== Consonants =====
Research into reconstruction of the consonants of Middle Mongol has engendered several controversies. Middle Mongol had two series of plosives, but there is disagreement as to which phonological dimension they lie on, whether aspiration or voicing. The early scripts have distinct letters for velar plosives and uvular plosives, but as these are in complementary distribution according to vowel harmony class, only two back plosive phonemes, */k/, */kʰ/ (~ *[k], *[qʰ]) are to be reconstructed. One prominent, long-running disagreement concerns certain correspondences of word medial consonants among the four major scripts (UM, SM, AM, and Ph, which were discussed in the preceding section). Word-medial /k/ of Uyghur Mongolian (UM) has not one, but two correspondences with the three other scripts: either /k/ or zero. Traditional scholarship has reconstructed */k/ for both correspondences, arguing that */k/ was lost in some instances, which raises the question of what the conditioning factors of those instances were. More recently, the other possibility has been assumed; namely, that the correspondence between UM /k/ and zero in the other scripts points to a distinct phoneme, /h/, which would correspond to the word-initial phoneme /h/ that is present in those other scripts. /h/ (also called /x/) is sometimes assumed to derive from */pʰ/, which would also explain zero in SM, AM, Ph in some instances where UM indicates /p/; e.g. debel > Khalkha deel.

The palatal affricates *č, *čʰ were fronted in Northern Modern Mongolian dialects such as Khalkha. *kʰ was spirantized to /x/ in Ulaanbaatar Khalkha and the Mongolian dialects south of it, e.g. Preclassical Mongolian kündü, reconstructed as *kʰynty 'heavy', became Modern Mongolian /xunt/ (but in the vicinity of Bayankhongor and Baruun-Urt, many speakers will say [kʰunt]). Originally word-final *n turned into /ŋ/; if *n was originally followed by a vowel that later dropped, it remained unchanged, e.g. *kʰen became /xiŋ/, but *kʰoina became /xɔin/. After i-breaking, *[ʃ] became phonemic. Consonants in words containing back vowels that were followed by *i in Proto-Mongolian became palatalized in Modern Mongolian. In some words, word-final *n was dropped with most case forms, but still appears with the ablative, dative and genitive.

Only foreign origin words start with the letter L and none start with the letter R.

===== Vowels =====
The standard view is that Proto-Mongolic had *i, *e, *y, *ø, *u, *o, *a. According to this view, *o and *u were pharyngealized to /ɔ/ and /ʊ/, then *y and *ø were velarized to /u/ and /o/. Thus, the vowel harmony shifted from a velar to a pharyngeal paradigm. *i in the first syllable of back-vocalic words was assimilated to the following vowel; in word-initial position it became /ja/. *e was rounded to *ø when followed by *y. VhV and VjV sequences where the second vowel was any vowel but *i were monophthongized. In noninitial syllables, short vowels were deleted from the phonetic representation of the word and long vowels became short; e.g. *imahan (*i becomes /ja/, *h disappears) > *jamaːn (unstable n drops; vowel reduction) > /jama(n)/ 'goat', and *emys- (regressive rounding assimilation) > *ømys- (vowel velarization) > *omus- (vowel reduction) > /oms-/ 'to wear'

This reconstruction has recently been opposed, arguing that vowel developments across the Mongolic languages can be more economically explained starting from basically the same vowel system as Khalkha, only with *[ə] instead of *[e]. Moreover, the sound changes involved in this alternative scenario are more likely from an articulatory point of view and early Middle Mongol loans into Korean.

==== Changes in morphology ====
===== Nominal system =====
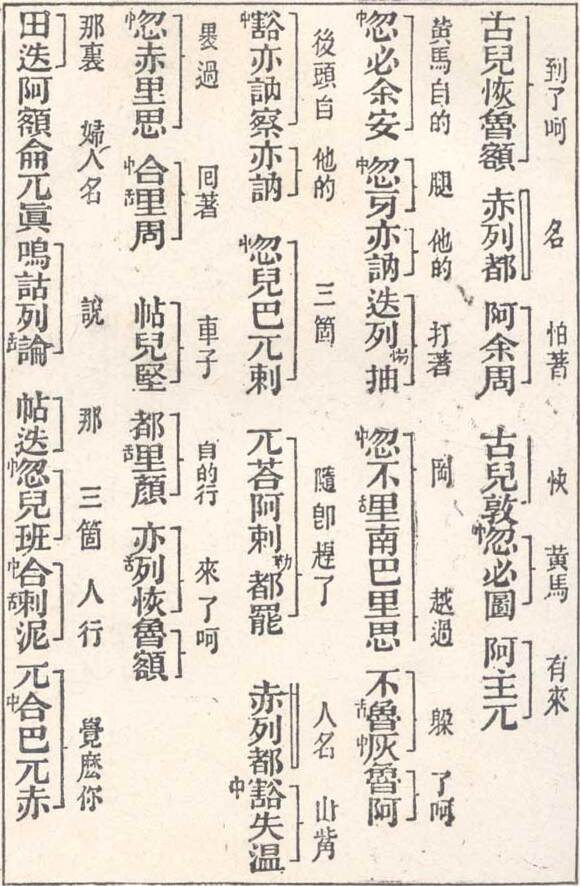
The Secret History of the Mongols which goes back to a lost Mongolian script original is the only document that allows the reconstruction of agreement in social gender in Middle Mongol.

In the ensuing discourse, as noted earlier, the term "Middle Mongol" is employed broadly to encompass texts scripted in either Uighur Mongolian (UM), Chinese (SM), or Arabic (AM).

The case system of Middle Mongol has remained mostly intact down to the present, although important changes occurred with the comitative and the dative and most other case suffixes did undergo slight changes in form, i.e., were shortened. The Middle Mongol comitative -luɣ-a could not be used attributively, but it was replaced by the suffix -taj that originally derived adjectives denoting possession from nouns, e.g. mori-tai 'having a horse' became mor'toj 'having a horse/with a horse'. As this adjective functioned parallel to ügej 'not having', it has been suggested that a "privative case" ('without') has been introduced into Mongolian. There have been three different case suffixes in the dative-locative-directive domain that are grouped in different ways: -a as locative and -dur, -da as dative or -da and -a as dative and -dur as locative, in both cases with some functional overlapping. As -dur seems to be grammaticalized from dotur-a 'within', thus indicating a span of time, the second account seems to be more likely. Of these, -da was lost, -dur was first reduced to -du and then to -d and -a only survived in a few frozen environments. Finally, the directive of modern Mongolian, -ruu, has been innovated from uruɣu 'downwards'. Social gender agreement was abandoned.

===== Verbal system =====
Middle Mongol had a slightly larger set of declarative finite verb suffix forms and a smaller number of participles, which were less likely to be used as finite predicates. The linking converb -n became confined to stable verb combinations, while the number of converbs increased. The distinction between male, female and plural subjects exhibited by some finite verbal suffixes was lost.

==== Changes in syntax ====
Neutral word order in clauses with pronominal subject changed from object–predicate–subject to subject–object–predicate; e.g.

Kökseü sabraq ügü.le-run ayyi yeke uge ugu.le-d ta ... kee-jüü.y
Kökseü sabraq speak-CVB alas big word speak-PAST you ... say-NFUT
"Kökseü sabraq spoke saying, 'Alas! You speak a great boast....' "

The syntax of verb negation shifted from negation particles preceding final verbs to a negation particle following participles; thus, as final verbs could no longer be negated, their paradigm of negation was filled by particles. For example, Preclassical Mongolian ese irebe 'did not come' v. modern spoken Khalkha Mongolian ireegüi or irsengüi.

== Classification ==
The Mongolic languages have no convincingly established living relatives. The closest relatives of the Mongolic languages appear to be the para-Mongolic languages, which include the extinct Khitan, Tuyuhun, and possibly also Tuoba languages.

Alexander Vovin (2007) identifies the extinct Tabɣač or Tuoba language as a Mongolic language. However, Chen (2005) argues that Tuoba (Tabɣač) was a Turkic language. Vovin (2018) suggests that the Rouran language of the Rouran Khaganate was a Mongolic language, close but not identical to Middle Mongolian.

=== Altaic ===
A few linguists have grouped Mongolic with Turkic, Tungusic and possibly Koreanic or Japonic as part of the controversial Altaic family.

Following Sergei Starostin, Martine Robbeets suggested that Mongolic languages belong to a "Transeurasian" superfamily also comprising Japonic languages, Korean, Tungusic languages and Turkic languages, but this view has been severely criticized.

=== Languages ===
Contemporary Mongolic languages are as follows. The classification and numbers of speakers follow Janhunen (2006), except for Southern Mongolic, which follows Nugteren (2011).

- Mongolic
  - Dagur (96,000 speakers)
  - Central Mongolic
    - Khamnigan Mongol (2,000 speakers)
    - Buryat (330,000 speakers)
    - Mongolian proper (5.2 million speakers)
    - Peripheral Mongolian (as Ordos)
    - Kalmyk–Oirat (360,000 speakers)
  - Southern Mongolic (part of a Gansu–Qinghai Sprachbund)
    - Eastern Yugur (4,000 speakers)
    - Shirongol
      - Monguor (150,000 speakers)
        - Mongghul/Huzhu Monguor
        - Mangghuer/Minhe Monguor
      - Baoanic
        - Bonan (6,000 speakers)
        - Santa (Dongxiang) (200,000 speakers)
        - Kangjia (1,000 speakers)
  - Moghol (extinct)

In another classificational approach, there is a tendency to call Central Mongolian a language consisting of Mongolian proper, Oirat and Buryat, while Ordos (and implicitly also Khamnigan) is seen as a variety of Mongolian proper. Within Mongolian proper, they then draw a distinction between Khalkha on the one hand and the Mongolian language in Inner Mongolia (containing everything else) on the other hand. A less common subdivision of Central Mongolic is to divide it into a Central dialect (Khalkha, Chakhar, Ordos), an Eastern dialect (Kharchin, Khorchin), a Western dialect (Oirat, Kalmyk), and a Northern dialect (consisting of two Buryat varieties).

The broader delimitation of Mongolian may be based on mutual intelligibility, but an analysis based on a tree diagram such as the one above faces other problems because of the close contacts between, for example, Buryat and Khalkha Mongols during history, thus creating or preserving a dialect continuum. Another problem lies in the sheer comparability of terminology, as Western linguists use language and dialect, while Mongolian linguists use the Grimmian trichotomy language (kele), dialect (nutuɣ-un ayalɣu) and Mundart (aman ayalɣu).

Rybatzki (2003: 388–389) recognizes the following 6 areal subgroups of Mongolic.

- Northeastern Mongolic (NE) = Dagur
- Northern Mongolic (N) = Khamnigan Mongol–Buryat
- Central Mongolic (C) = Mongol proper–Ordos–Oirat
- South-Central Mongolic (SC) = Shira Yughur
- Southeastern Mongolic (SE) = Mongghul–Mangghuer–Bonan–Santa – Kangjia
- Southwestern Mongolic (SW) = Moghol

Additionally, the Max Planck Institute for Evolutionary Anthropology refers to Central Mongolic as "Eastern Mongolic" and classifies the group as follows, using data from Rybatzki (2003) as its basis:

- Eastern Mongolic
  - Khalkha–Buriat
    - Buriat
      - China Buriat
      - Mongolia Buriat
      - Russia Buriat
    - Mongolian
      - Halh Mongolian
      - Oirad–Kalmyk–Darkhat
      - Peripheral Mongolian
  - Khamnigan

=== Mixed languages ===
The following are mixed Sinitic–Mongolic languages.

- Tangwang (mixed Mandarin–Santa)
- Wutun (mixed Mandarin–Bonan)

== Writing systems ==
- The traditional Mongolian script (based on the Old Uyghur alphabet) was first developed for Proto-Mongolic, possibly as early as the 7th century.
- In 1931, the Mongolian People's Republic adopted a Mongolian version of the Latin alphabet as the official script for Mongolian.
- Under Soviet influence, in 1941 Mongolia switched to a version of the Russian alphabet called Mongolian Cyrillic.
- In March 2020, the Mongolian government announced plans to use both Cyrillic and the traditional Mongolian script in official documents by 2025.

== See also ==
- Inscription of Hüis Tolgoi
