= Khamnigan Mongol =

Central Mongolic language

- ᠬᠠᠮᠨᠢᠭᠠᠨ
- Native to: China, Russia, Mongolia
- Region: Onon–Argun basin, Transbaikalia
- Ethnicity: Hamnigans
- Native speakers: (undated figure of 2,000)
- Language family: Serbi–Mongolic: Mongolic; Central Mongolic; Khamnigan Mongol
- Writing system: Mongolian script, Cyrillic

Language codes
- ISO 639-3: ykh
- Glottolog: kham1281
- ELP: Khamnigan Mongol

Khamnigan (Khamnigan: ᠬᠠᠮᠨᠢᠭᠠᠨ) is a Mongolic language spoken by the Hamnigan people east of Lake Baikal.

== Usage ==
The Khamnigan people, called the Horse Tungus or Steppe Tungus, are natively bilingual, speaking both a Mongolic and a Tungusic language, which are inherited from their mixed ancestry. This bilingualism appears to be several centuries old. Their Tungusic language is Evenki (Khamnigan is the Mongol name for the Evenki), while Khamnigan Mongol is a distinct Mongolic language, not a dialect of Mongol or Buryat as traditionally classified in Mongolia or in Russia. Mongol is the dominant language; the two dialects of Evenki are only used by part of the population, and only within the home.

Use of the language has declined in Russia, with few speakers left, but both Khamnigan Mongol and Evenki bilingualism remain vigorous in China. Khamnigan Evenki, though not a distinct language from other Evenki, is heavily influenced by Mongol, especially in vocabulary. Khamnigan Mongol, on the other hand, is the most conservative Mongolic language, little different from Middle Mongolian, though the system of vowel harmony has been disrupted. There is little influence from Evenki: although Khamnigan Evenki has a grammatical plural, for example, Khamnigan Mongol does not.

Khamnigan in Mongolia has strongly assimilated to Khalkha Mongolian, and even though some Buryat-like and idiosyncratic features are to be found (e.g. the very particular mood system lacking in Khamnigan in China), it overall resembles a dialect of Khalkha, and it has lost its particular Tungusic lexicon.

== Orthography ==
Khamnigan is written using the Mongolian script. In Russia, Khamnigan is written using Cyrillic (Russian alphabet with additional letters Ө ө and Ү ү).

== See also ==
- Hamnigan (Hamnigan Mongols)
