= Kangjia language =

Southern Mongolic language

Kangjia
- Native to: China
- Region: Qinghai
- Ethnicity: 2,000 (2007)
- Native speakers: 1,000 (2007)
- Language family: Mongolic: Southern Mongolic; Shirongol; Baoanic; Kangjia

Language codes
- ISO 639-3: kxs
- Glottolog: kang1281
- ELP: Kangjia
- Kangjia is classified as Severely Endangered by the UNESCO Atlas of the World's Languages in Danger.

The Kangjia language (Chinese: 康家语; pinyin: Kāngjiāyǔ) is a Mongolic language spoken by a Muslim population of around 300 people in Jainca (Jianzha) County, Huangnan Tibetan Autonomous Prefecture in Qinghai province of China. As to its taxonomic affiliation, Kangjia seems to be an intermediate between Bonan language and Santa language (Dongxiang).

== Phonology ==
Kangjia has nine vowels.

Vowels
	Front	Central	Back
Close		ʉ	u
Near-close		ɪ̈	
Close-mid	e		o
Mid		ə	
Open-mid			ɔ
Open	a		

Consonants
		Bilabial	Alveolar	Postalveolar	Palatal	Velar	Uvular	Glottal
Nasal		m	n			ŋ		
Plosive/ Affricate	voiceless	p	t͡s	t͡ʃ		k	q	
Plosive/ Affricate	voiced	b	d͡z	d͡ʒ		g	ɢ	
Fricative	voiceless	f	s	ʃ			χ	h
Fricative	voiced	v	z			ɣ	ʁ	
Approximant			l		j			
Trill			r					
