= Tangwang language =

Mixed language of Chinese and Mongolic

Tangwang
- Native to: China
- Region: Gansu
- Native speakers: (20,000 cited 1995)
- Language family: Mixed Mandarin–Santa

Language codes
- ISO 639-3: None (mis)
- Glottolog: tang1373
- IETF: crp-u-sd-cngs
- Tangwang is classified as Definitely Endangered by the UNESCO Atlas of the World's Languages in Danger.

The Tangwang language (Chinese: 唐汪话; pinyin: Tángwànghuà) is a variety of Mandarin Chinese heavily influenced by the Mongolic Santa language (Dongxiang). It is spoken in a dozen or so villages in Dongxiang Autonomous County, Gansu Province, China. The linguist Mei W. Lee-Smith calls this creole language the "Tangwang language" (Chinese: 唐汪话), based on the names of the two largest villages (Tangjia 唐家 and Wangjia 汪家, parts of Tangwang town) where it is spoken.

== Speakers ==
According to Lee-Smith (1996), the Tangwang language is spoken by about 20,000 people living in the north-eastern part of the Dongxiang Autonomous County (Tangwang town). These people self-identify as Dongxiang (Santa) or Hui people. The Tangwang speakers do not speak the Dongxiang language.

== Description ==
The Tangwang language uses mostly Mandarin words and morphemes with Dongxiang grammar. Besides Dongxiang loanwords, Tangwang also has a substantial number of Arabic and Persian loanwords.

Like standard Mandarin, Tangwang is a tonal language. However, grammatical particles, which are typically borrowed from Mandarin but used in the way Dongxiang morphemes would be used in Dongxiang, do not carry tones.

For example, while the Mandarin plural suffix -men (们) has only very restricted usage (it can be used with personal pronouns and some nouns related to people), Tangwang uses it, in the form -m, universally, the way Dongxiang would use its plural suffix -la. The Mandarin pronoun nǐ (你) can be used in Tangwang as a possessive suffix (meaning "your").

Unlike Mandarin, but like Dongxiang, Tangwang has grammatical cases as well (but only four of them, instead of eight in Dongxiang).

The word order of Tangwang is the same as Dongxiang subject–object–verb form.

Tangwang combines the characteristics of Mandarin Chinese and Dongxiang Mongolian. The hybrid language is a symbol of language blending. According to Lee-Smith, the blending is caused by the Silk Road.

== See also ==
- Tangwang town
- Wutun language
