= Wutun language =

Chinese–Tibetan–Mongolian creole language of northwestern China

Wutun
- Ngandehua
- Native to: China
- Region: Qinghai province, mainly in Tongren County
- Ethnicity: Tibetans
- Native speakers: 4,000 (2016)
- Language family: mixed Lower Yangtze Mandarin–Amdo–Bonan

Language codes
- ISO 639-3: wuh
- Glottolog: wutu1241
- ELP: Wutunhua

The Wutun language (Chinese: 五屯话; pinyin: Wǔtúnhuà) is a Mandarin–Amdo–Bonan creole language. It is spoken by about 4,000 people, most of whom are classified as Monguor (Tu) by the Chinese government. Wutun speakers reside in two villages (Upper Wutun 上五屯 and Lower Wutun 下五屯) of Tongren County, eastern Qinghai province, China. It is also known as the Ngandehua language.

The two Wutun villages, as well as other villages in the area, were under the control of a Mongol banner for several centuries, and have long been regarded by governments as members of a Mongol ethnic group. However, they self-identify as Tibetans.

== History ==
A number of theories have been proposed about the origin of the Wutun villagers, and their peculiar dialect. The Chinese linguist Chen Naixiong infers from the vowel distribution of the Chinese lexical items in Wutun speech that their ancestors may have spoken an old Nanjing dialect. Others think that they may have been a group of Hui people (Chinese-speaking Muslims) from Sichuan who, for reasons unknown, converted to Tibetan Buddhism and moved to eastern Qinghai. In any event, historical documents as old as 1585 attest to the existence of the Wutun community.

Today's Wutun villagers do not speak Chinese, but the knowledge of Tibetan is common both in Wutun and in Tongren County in general, as the Tibetan language is the lingua franca of this multiethnic region, which is populated by Tibetans and Hui people, as well as some Han Chinese and Mongols.

Erika Sandman said Wutun speakers most likely descend from Mongol and Tibetan women marrying newly settled Chinese soldiers in the 14th century.

== Phonology ==
=== Consonants ===
The following table shows the consonants of Wutun.

		Labial	Dental		Retroflex	Alveolo- palatal	Palatal	Velar
		Labial	plain	sibilant	Retroflex	Alveolo- palatal	Palatal	Velar
Nasal		m ⟨m⟩	n ⟨n⟩					ŋ ⟨ng⟩
Plosive/ Affricate	tenuis	p ⟨b⟩	t ⟨d⟩	t͡s ⟨z⟩	ʈ͡ʂ ⟨zh⟩	t͡ɕ ⟨j⟩	c͡ç ⟨jh⟩	k ⟨g⟩
Plosive/ Affricate	aspirated	pʰ ⟨p⟩	tʰ ⟨t⟩	t͡sʰ ⟨c⟩	ʈ͡ʂʰ ⟨ch⟩	t͡ɕʰ ⟨q⟩	c͡çʰ ⟨qh⟩	kʰ ⟨k⟩
Plosive/ Affricate	voiced	b ⟨bb⟩	d ⟨dd⟩	d͡z ⟨zz⟩	ɖ͡ʐ ⟨zzh⟩	d͡ʑ ⟨jj⟩	ɟ͡ʝ ⟨jjh⟩	g ⟨gg⟩
Fricative	tenuis	f ⟨f⟩	ɬ ⟨lh⟩	(s) ⟨sz⟩		ɕ ⟨x⟩		x ~ h ⟨h⟩
Fricative	aspirated			sʰ ⟨s⟩	ʂʰ ⟨sh⟩			
Fricative	voiced			z ⟨ss⟩		ʑ ⟨xx⟩		ɣ ~ ʁ ⟨gh⟩
Approximant		w ⟨w⟩	l ⟨l⟩		ɻ ⟨r⟩		j ⟨y⟩	ɧ ⟨xh⟩

- /s/ has a very limited distribution; speakers contrast /s, sʰ/ only in some Tibetan loanwords.
- /ɧ/ might be an unorthodox way to represent /ɰ/.

=== Vowels ===
Wutun consists of six basic vowels, /a e i o u ə/ which are influenced to some extent by their consonantal environment. For instance, vowels are velarized before ⟨k⟩, as in ek [əˠ] 'two' or maidok [metoˠ] 'flower'.

		Front	Central	Back
Close	short	i ⟨i⟩		u ⟨u⟩
Close	long	iː ⟨ii⟩		uː ⟨uu⟩
Mid		e ⟨ai⟩	ə ⟨e⟩	o ⟨o⟩
Open		a ~ ɑ ⟨a⟩		

== Grammar ==
The Wutun grammar derives from Amdo Tibetan. There is also a Bonan influence.

== Vocabulary ==
The greatest portion of Wutun lexical items is Chinese (but with their tones lost); a smaller one, from Amdo Tibetan, the local lingua franca; and an even smaller element comes from the Bonan Mongolian language.

== See also ==
- Tangwang language
- Dao language (China)
- Selibu language
