= Bonan language =

Southern Mongolic language

Bonan
- མ་ནི་སྐད་ཅི, Ma ni skad ci
- Native to: China
- Region: Gansu, Qinghai
- Native speakers: (6,000 cited 1999)
- Language family: Mongolic: Southern; Shirongol; Baoanic; Bonan
- Writing system: Tibetan script

Language codes
- ISO 639-3: peh
- Glottolog: bona1250
- Bonan is classified as Definitely Endangered by the UNESCO Atlas of the World's Languages in Danger.

The Bonan language (pronounced [p⁼aoˈnaŋ], Baonang; Chinese: 保安语, Bǎo'ānyǔ; Amdo Tibetan: Dorké), also known by its endonym Manikacha (Tibetan: མ་ནི་སྐད་ཅི; Wylie: Ma ni skad ci), is the Mongolic language of the Bonan people of China. As of 1985, it was spoken by about 8,000 people, including about 75% of the total Bonan ethnic population and many ethnic Monguor, in Gansu and Qinghai Provinces. There are several dialects, which are influenced to varying degrees – but always heavily – by Chinese and Tibetan, while bilingualism in Wutun is less common. The most commonly studied is the Tongren dialect. Bonan is not typically written by speakers, though there is a folk practice of writing Bonan with the Tibetan syllabary following Amdo pronunciation.

== Phonology ==
Bonan phonology has been heavily influenced by Tibetan. Consonants possess a voicing contrast. Initial consonant clusters of mostly falling sonority are present in native words, as are heavy diphthongs, though the content of both is heavily restricted. The possible word-initial consonant clusters in Bonan are [mp, nt, nt͡ɕ, ntʂ, ŋk, tʰχ, χt͡ɕ, rt͡ɕ, lt͡ɕ, ft, fk, ʂp, ʂk].

=== Vowels ===
Ñantoq Baoan has six vowels, with long counterparts for all except /ə/.

	Front		Central		Back	
	short	long	short	long	short	long
Close	i	iː			u	uː
Mid	e	eː	ə		ɤ	ɤː
Open			a	aː		

- /ɤ, ɤː/ may also be heard as rounded, central [ɵ, ɵː].

=== Consonants ===
==== Fried (2010) ====
Fried (2010) identifies the following consonant phonemes:

		Labial	Alveolar		Retroflex	Alveolo- palatal	Palatal	Velar/ Uvular
		Labial	plain	sibilant	Retroflex	Alveolo- palatal	Palatal	Velar/ Uvular
Nasal		m	n				ɲ	ŋ
Plosive/ Affricate	tenuis	p	t	t͡s	t͡ʂ	t͡ɕ		k
Plosive/ Affricate	aspirated	pʰ	tʰ	t͡sʰ	t͡ʂʰ	t͡ɕʰ		kʰ
Plosive/ Affricate	preasp.	ʰp	ʰt			ʰt͡ɕ		ʰk
Plosive/ Affricate	voiced	b	d		d͡ʐ			g
Continuant	voiceless	f	ɬ	s	ʂ	ɕ	ç	χ
Continuant	voiced	w	l	z	ɹ	ʑ	j	ʁ

- /w/ is realized as [w ~ ʋ] in free variation, but [w] occurs more frequently.

==== Chen & Chingeltei (1986) ====
Chen & Chingeltei (1986) identify the following consonant phonemes:

		Labial	Alveolar		Retroflex	Alveolo- palatal	Velar/ Palatal	Uvular	Pharyn- geal
		Labial	plain	sibilant	Retroflex	Alveolo- palatal	Velar/ Palatal	Uvular	Pharyn- geal
Nasal		m	n			ȵ	ŋ		
Plosive/ Affricate	tenuis	p	t	t͡s	t͡ʂ	t͡ɕ	k	q	
Plosive/ Affricate	aspirated	pʰ	tʰ	t͡sʰ	t͡ʂʰ	t͡ɕʰ	kʰ		
Plosive/ Affricate	preasp.		ʰt		ʰt͡ʂ	ʰt͡ɕ	ʰk		
Plosive/ Affricate	prenasal	ᵐb	ⁿd	ⁿd͡z	ᶯd͡ʐ	ᶮd͡ʑ	ᵑg	ᶰɢ	
Continuant	tenuis	f	ɬ	s	ʂ	ɕ	ç	χ	ħ
Continuant	preasp.			ʰs		ʰɕ			
Continuant	voiced	w	l	z	r	ʑ	j		ʕ

- Chen & Chingeltei (1986) additionally identify the following pre-rhotacized consonant phonemes: /ʳm, ʳŋ, ʳp, ʳt, ʳk/.

==== Wu (2003) ====
Wu (2003) identifies the following consonant phonemes:

		Labial	Alveolar		Retroflex	Alveolo- palatal	Palatal	Velar	Glottal
		Labial	plain	sibilant	Retroflex	Alveolo- palatal	Palatal	Velar	Glottal
Nasal	plain	m	n				ɲ	ŋ	
Nasal	preasp.		ʰn				ʰɲ	ʰŋ	
Plosive/ Affricate	tenuis	p	t	t͡s	t͡ʂ	t͡ɕ		k	
Plosive/ Affricate	aspirated	pʰ	tʰ	t͡sʰ	t͡ʂʰ	t͡ɕʰ		kʰ	
Plosive/ Affricate	preasp.		ʰt	ʰt͡s	ʰt͡ʂ	ʰt͡ɕ		ʰk	
Plosive/ Affricate	pre+post		ʰtʰ	ʰt͡sʰ	ʰt͡ʂʰ	ʰt͡ɕʰ		ʰkʰ	
Plosive/ Affricate	prenasal	ᵐb	ⁿd	ⁿd͡z	ᶯd͡ʐ	ᶮd͡ʑ		ᵑg	
Continuant	tenuis	f	ɬ	s	ʂ	ɕ		x	h
Continuant	preasp.		ʰl	ʰz		ʰʑ	ʰj		
Continuant	voiced	w	l	z	r	ʑ	j	ɣ	

- Wu (2003) additionally identifies the following pre-rhotacized consonant phonemes: /ʳm, ʳŋ, ʳp, ʳt, ʳk, ʳpʰ, ʳtʰ, ʳt͡ɕʰ, ʳkʰ/.

== Morphology ==
Bonan, like other Mongolic languages, is agglutinative.

There are five case markings for Bonan nouns: Nominative, Accusative-Genitive, Dative-Locative, Ablative-Comparative, and Instrumentative.

Verbal morphology is quite complex. Evidentiality is marked in the indicative mood as "definite" or "indefinite" with a specific suffix or with an auxiliary verb. The present definite is used to mark naturally occurring phenomena, while the present indefinite indicates the habits of animals. The indefinite may also mark volition. The future, continuous, and perfective suffixes also possess markers for evidentiality that are often used to mark negation.

== Syntax ==
Bonan has a primary SOV (subject–object–verb), but topicalization of an object is common. It is known for its peculiar double marking of the copula. A Mongolic copula, of which there are several with different meanings, comes sentence-finally, following Bonan SOV word order, while a copula [ʂɪ] from Chinese /ʂɨ̂/ "to be" appears between the copula's subject and complement, as in Chinese SVO word order. This Chinese copula is optional and is used to emphasize the subject. The definite, but not indefinite, copula can also act as a participle following some finite verbs. For example:

ənə ʂɪ kuŋʂə-nə t͡ɕʰitʂə o
this COP commune-GEN car IND.COP
"This is the commune's car." (Buhe & Liu 1985: 65)

Uniquely among Mongolic languages, adjectives follow the noun they modify. This is due to Tibetan influence.

== Bibliography ==
- Üjiyediin Chuluu (Chaolu Wu) (1994). Introduction, Grammar, and Sample Sentences for Baoan (PDF). Sino-Platonic Papers, 58.
- Bu, He 布和; Liu, Zhaoxiong 刘照雄, eds. (1982). Bǎo'ānyǔ jiǎnzhì 保安语简志 [A Brief Description of Baonan] (in Chinese). Beijing: Renmin chubanshe.
- Chen, Naixiong 陈乃雄, ed. (1985). Bǎo'ānyǔ cíhuì 保安语词汇 [Baoan Vocabulary] (in Chinese). Huhehaote: Neimenggu renmin chubanshe.
- ———, ed. (1986). Bǎo'ānyǔ huàyǔ cáiliào 保安语话语材料 [Baoan Language Materials] (in Chinese). Huhehaote: Neimenggu renmin chubanshe.
- Chen, Naixiong 陈乃雄; Cinggaltai 清格尔泰 (1986). Bǎo'ānyǔ hé Ménggǔyǔ 保安语和蒙古语 [Baoan and Mongolian Languages] (in Chinese). Huhehaote: Neimenggu renmin chubanshe.
- Fried, Robert Wayne (2010). A Grammar of Bao'an Tu: A Mongolic Language of Northwest China (Ph.D. thesis). State University of New York at Buffalo. ProQuest 578487588.
