= Santa language =

Mongolic language of Northwest China

Santa
- Dongxiang
- Dunxian kielen, Sarta kelen
- Native to: China
- Region: Gansu (mainly Linxia Hui Autonomous Prefecture) and Xinjiang (Ili Kazakh Autonomous Prefecture)
- Native speakers: 200,000 (2007)
- Language family: Mongolic: Southern Mongolic; Shirongol; Baoanic; Santa
- Writing system: Arabic, Latin

Language codes
- ISO 639-3: sce
- Glottolog: dong1285
- ELP: Dongxiang
- Santa is classified as Vulnerable by the UNESCO Atlas of the World's Languages in Danger.

The Santa language, also known as Dongxiang (simplified Chinese: 东乡语; traditional Chinese: 東鄉語; pinyin: Dōngxiāngyǔ), is a Mongolic language spoken by the Dongxiang people in Northwest China.

== Dialects ==
There are no dialects in strict sense, but three local varieties (tuyu) can be found: Suonanba (c. 50% of all Dongxiang speakers), Wangjiaji (c. 30% of all Dongxiang speakers) and Sijiaji (c. 20% of all Dongxiang speakers).

== Phonology ==
Compared to other Mongolic languages, there is no vowel harmony, except for a handful of suffixes. However, the rules governing this phenomenon are by far not as strict as those of Mongolian.

=== Consonants ===
Santa has 29 consonants:

		Labial	Alveolar	Retroflex	Palatal	Velar	Uvular	Glottal
Plosive	plain	p	t			k	q	
Plosive	aspirated	pʰ	tʰ			kʰ	qʰ	
Fricative	voiceless	f	s	ʂ	ɕ	x		h
Fricative	voiced			(ʐ)			ʁ	
Affricate	plain		(t͡s)	t͡ʂ	t͡ɕ			
Affricate	aspirated		(t͡sʰ)	t͡ʂʰ	t͡ɕʰ			
Nasal		m	n			ŋ		
Approximant		w	l		j			
Trill			r					

- The aspirated stops /pʰ, tʰ, kʰ, qʰ/, at varying degrees, tend to be affricated before close vowels as [p͡ɸʰ, t͡θʰ, k͡xʰ, q͡χʰ] respectively:
  - /qʰ/ → [q͡χʰ]: This has the most noticeable affrication, seen in ghudogvo [q͡χʰutoˈʁo] (knife).
  - /pʰ/ → [p͡ɸʰ]: Still commonly affricated, e.g. pixie [p͡ɸʰi̥ˈɕi̯ɛ] (belt).
  - /tʰ/ → [t͡θʰ]: Affrication is salient, but seems to be more apparent with [ɯ] than [u], as in tiigha [t͡θʰɯ̥ˈqɑ] (chicken).
  - /kʰ/ → [k͡xʰ]: This consonant is the least affricated, but is still attested in kiqie [k͡xʰi̥ˈt͡ɕi̯ɛ] (to lie down).
- Likewise, before non-close vowels aspirated stops do not show affrication e.g. ta [tʰɑ] (to guess), korolon [kʰoroˈlõŋ] (footprint), or khalun [qʰɑˈlũŋ] (hot).
- Phonemes /t͡sʰ, t͡s, ʐ/ are only found in loanwords:
  - /t͡sʰ/ is only found in Chinese-derived words, as in cai /t͡sʰɑj/ (vegetable; from Chinese 菜 cài). It is frequently deaffricated to the native [s].
  - /t͡s/ is found within Chinese and Persian borrowings, with Persian زمین zamin (earth) rendered as zemin /t͡səˈmi(ŋ)/.
  - /ʐ/ in the same way is seen in words of Chinese and Arabic origin, as in renshen /ʐəŋˈʂəŋ/ (ginseng; Chinese 人參 rénshēn).
- The nasals /n, ŋ/ assimilate to [m] before labials, as in unba /unˈpɑ/ → [ũmˈpɑ] (to swim) and banban /pɑŋˈpɑŋ/ → [pɑ̃mˈpɑ̃ŋ] (cudgel) respectively. /ŋ/ also has another allophone [ɴ] before uvulars, cf. zhangha /t͡ʂɑŋˈqɑ/ → [t͡ʂɑ̃ɴˈqɑ] (walnut).
- Nasals are commonly deleted in the coda, which is an areal feature around the border between Gansu and Qinghai. Although it is not restricted to word-final situations, it is rarer to find deletion there as the following consonantal onsets somehow reinforce the nasal. It should also be noted that vowels preceding nasal consonants are also nasalized themselves.
- The central approximants /j, w/ are fricativized [ʝ, v] when syllable-initial, mainly before close vowels. /w/ can further be found before front vowels and even low back vowels. An example of fricatization for each is yibai [ˈʝipɛi̯] (one hundred) and weila [və̝i̯ˈlɑ] (to cry). This phenomenon can also be found in neighboring languages, including Dungan and Monguor.
- /ʁ/, which is usually realized as a fricative, can be pronounced as an approximant [ʁ̞] in fast speech.
- /r/ is usually a trill, and length is dependent on the speed of speech; similarly in rapid speech it can become a tap [ɾ].

=== Vowels ===
Dongxiang has 7 vowels. Unlike other neighboring Mongolic languages, it has limited vowel harmony and no distinctions of vowel length.

	Front	Central		Back	
	Front	plain	rhotacised	unrounded	rounded
Close	i			ɯ	u
Mid		ə	ɚ		o
Open				ɑ	

- /i/, which is usually a close front vowel, has a backened allophone [ɨ] after retroflex consonants, and a slightly opened one [ɪ] after alveolar affricates and fricatives. Compare chi [t͡ʂʰɨ] (you [2nd sing.]) with misi [miˈsɪ] (to fly).
- Close vowels are devoiced when in an unstressed initial syllable and between voiceless consonants, for example: chighin [t͡ʂʰɨ̥ˈqə̃ŋ] (ear), sidara [sɪ̥tɑˈrɑ] (to catch fire) and khidun [q͡χʰɯ̥ˈtũŋ] (hard). This is not the case though before a voiced consonant, especially if it is of native Mongolic origin, as evidenced with chila [t͡ʂʰɨˈlɑ] (to be exhausted) and suma [suˈmɑ] (arrow).
  - In Chinese loans, devoicing is optional, i.e. chugui (cupboard; from 櫥櫃 chúguì) can be pronounced either [t͡ʂʰu̥ˈku̯ə̝i̯] or [t͡ʂʰuˈku̯ə̝i̯].
  - The mid-central vowel /ə/ has also been recorded voiceless in the aforementioned environment: pese [pʰə̥ˈsɛ] (again).
  - Devoicing of /i/ can also occur regardless of the following sound and in non-initial syllables, under the condition it occurs after /s/: basi [ˈpɑsɪ̥] (tiger) or kewosila [kʰəˌwɑsɪ̥ˈlɑ] (children). Interestingly, it is not often the case, as in bositu [pʷosɪˈtʰu] (pregnant).
- /ɚ/ is always a syllabified as its own, as in ershi [ɚ.ʂɨ] (twenty), with the exception of one Arabic loanword with glottal /h/ as the onset: ruhher [ʐu.hɚ] (spirit; from رُوح rūḥ).
- /o/ is often pronounced with a considerable degree of labialization [ʷo], however this can be inconsistent, even in the same utterance; cf. olien [ʷoˈli̯ɛ̃n] (cloud) vs. onghono [õɴqõˈno] (to shout).
- When stressed, /ə/ is typically realized as mid-front [ɛ]: enzhegve [ə̃nt͡ʂəˈʁɛ] (donkey). Before /ŋ/, [ɤ] is used instead: amen [ɑˈmɤ̃ŋ] (rice). Otherwise in unstressed syllables it is mid-central [ə].
- [ɑ] is typically an open back vowel, e.g. apa [ɑˈpʰɑ] (barley), but before alveolar nasals it is fronted to [æ]; an example is dan [tæ̃n] (carrying pole with loads). Before velar nasals, as in dan [tɑ̃ŋ] ([political] party), the back form is used.

==== Glides ====
Although true diphthongal sequences (i.e. complex vowel combinations) do not exist in Santa, combinations with the vowels /u, ə, ɑ/ and the glides /j, w/ do. The glides are phonetically realized as non-syllabic vowels [i̯, u̯] and the vowels have the following phonetic realizations below, regardless of any previous allophonic rules as mentioned above.

Glide/vowel combinations
		Vowel + Glide	Glide + Vowel	Additional	
		Vowel + Glide	Glide + Vowel	/j/	/w/
/u/	/j/	—	/ju/	—	—
/u/	/w/	—	—	—	—
/ə/	/j/	/əj/	/jə/	—	—
/ə/	/w/	/əw/	—	/wəj/	—
/ɑ/	/j/	/ɑj/	/jɑ/	—	/jɑw/
/ɑ/	/w/	/ɑw/	/wɑ/	/wɑj/	—

Distinct phonetic vowel realizations (note that vowels in other environments take the cardinal form):

- /ə/:
  - Before /j/, the vowel is raised to [ə̝], e.g. khighei [q͡χʰɯ̥ˈqə̝i̯] (pig), falling somewhere in between [ə] and [i].
    - If also after /w/, the vowel is optionally dropped, as in ghuilu [qu̯(ə̝)i̯ˈlu] (to become).
  - After /j/, it is pronounced like stressed [ɛ]; for instance nie [ni̯ɛ] (one) or bierei [pi̯ɛˈri] (wife).
  - Before /w/, backness is often applied so that it varies between [ə~ɤ]: hotou [xʷoˈtəu̯~xʷoˈtɤu̯] (maggot).
- /ɑ/:
  - Before /j/, it may be raised, varying from [ɑ~ɛ], see bai [pɑi̯~pɛi̯] (to stop), kuaisun [kʰu̯ɑi̯ˈsũŋ~kʰu̯ɛi̯ˈsũŋ] (navel).
  - Before /w/, the vowel is often raised and backed, ranging from [ɑ~o] in nao [nɑu̯~nou̯] (to hit the mark), oqiao [ʷoˈt͡ɕʰi̯ɑu̯~ʷoˈt͡ɕʰi̯ou̯] (old).

=== Phonotactics ===
The general syllable template for Santa is (C)(G)V(G/N), where the brackets represent optional phonemes. C represents any consonant apart from /ŋ/ or a glide, G is one of the glides /j, w/, V is a vowel and G/N is either a glide or a nasal /n, ŋ/ (occasionally also /r/). However, there are further constraints to this scheme:

- The obstruents /pʰ, qʰ, f, x, h/ in words of Monogolic origin can only be found at the beginning of words.
- Also, /ɕ/ can occur at any position syllable-initially, but not after nasals of glides.
- /r, ʁ/ on the other hand can only occur after vowels. It is also possible for /ʁ/ to occur after nasals, but not /r/ due to the sonorant rule.
- /ʂ, ɕ, t͡ɕ, m/ can occur word-initially but between syllables only after vowels.
- It is impossible for non-compounded words of Mongolic origin for a sonorant (with the exception of the glide [i̯]) to follow a nasal after a syllable boundary. However, three exceptions exist: manlou [mɑ̃ŋˈləu̯] (forehead), danlei [tæ̃nˈləi̯] (palate) and chanlie [t͡ʂʰæ̃nˈli̯ə] (to listen).
  - Words borrowed from Mandarin Chinese do not follow this rule, seen with rinmin [ʐəŋˈmin] (people; from 人民 rénmín).

=== Stress ===
The majority of words in Santa are stressed on the final syllable. Examples include yawu /jɑˈwu/ (to walk), funiegvan /funjəˈʁɑŋ/ (fox) and agven /ɑˈʁəŋ/ (village). Stress also shifts to the suffix when added to a word: funiegvan-ni /funjəʁɑŋˈni/ (fox, genitive case), agven-de /ɑʁəŋˈdə/ (village, locative case).

However, several exceptions to this rule exist:

- Certain enclitics fall outside the domain of word-level stress. When they attach, the stress remains on the final syllable of the root rather than shifting to the absolute end of the word, as seen in yawu=ne /jɑˈwunə/ (will walk/walks, imperfective) and tomo=ghala /tʰoˈmoqɑlɑ/ (hammer, instrumental). However, not every clitic follows this rule.
- When the disyllabic suffixes +jiwo and +senu are added, they attract stress to their initial syllable, resulting in penultimate stress for the word as a whole: jawu+jiwo /jɑwuˈt͡ʂiwo/ (to walk, progressive) and ire+senu /irəˈsənu/ (as soon as one comes).
- Similarly, basi /ˈpɑsi/ (tiger) and bosi /ˈposi/ (cloth) are stressed on the initial syllable. There is a minimal pair with bosi, where the stress on the final syllable (i.e., /poˈsi/) means 'to wake up'.
- Loanwords may also violate the final stress rule; this is discussed below.

==== In loanwords ====
In Chinese loanwords, stress is not predictable; this is likely due to the tonal influence from the original pronunciation. However, these tones are based on the dialects of the Hui people rather than the standard dialect. Examples of non-final stress include hushi /ˈxuʂi/ (nurse; from 护士 hùshì), daozi /ˈdɑwt͡si/ (rice paddy; from 稻子 dàozi) and dadou /ˈdɑdəw/ (soybean; from 大豆 dàdòu). Minimal pairs, though uncommon, also exist. One example is shizi /ˈʂit͡si/ (persimmon; from 柿子 shìzi) and shizi /ʂiˈt͡si/ (lion; from 狮子 shīzi).

There are a number of Arabic loanwords which also violate ultimate stress; these include aghili /ˈɑqili/ (wisdom; from عَقِيْل ʿaqīl), mehheri /ˈməhəri/ (dowry; from مَهْر mahr), ghalebu /qɑˈləbu/ (body, form; from قَالَب qālab), etc.

Some words with unknown origin may also stress on other syllables, including tonghori /ˈtʰoŋqori/ (wild goose), dawala /ˈtɑwɑlɑ/ (urinary bladder) and bawa /ˈpɑwɑ/ (great-grandfather).

== Grammar ==
=== Morphology ===
Santa is an agglutinative, strictly suffixing language.

==== Plural marking ====
Plurality is primarily marked on human and animate nouns. There are three primary plural suffixes, conditioned by the lexical class of the noun:

Marker	Class	Example
-la	General plural for nouns and pronouns	ghoni → ghoni-la sheep {} sheep(s)
-sila / -sla	Restricted to certain nouns and pronouns	oqin → oqin-sila girl {} girls
-cai	Restricted to kinship terms	gajijiao → gajijiao-cai brother {} brothers

=== Noun phrase ===
==== Cases ====
Santa nominals inflect for six primary cases. In addition to these six core cases, certain directional and locational enclitics (like the aspectual -re and locative–prosecutive -gvun) frequently attach to nouns to express spatial relationships.

Marker	Case	Example	Marker	Case	Example
-∅	Nominative	morei holu-we horse run-PRF "The horse ran."	-le	Comitative	chi ibura-le hhantu echi-∅ 2SG Ibura-COM together go-IMP "You go together with Ibura."
-ni (rarely -yi)	Genitive–Accusative	bula-ni usu spring-GEN water "spring water"	-ghala / -guala	Sociative–Instrumental	khidei-ghala kielie-∅ Chinese-INST speak-IMP "Speak in Chinese."
-de	Dative–Locative–Benefactive	ula-de khirei-∅ mountain-DAT climb-IMP "Climb the mountain."	-re	Directional (Aspectual)	bi chima-re sana-ne 1SG 2SG-DIR settle.accounts-IPFV "I want to settle accounts with you."
-se	Ablative–Comparative	udani hon-se gao-we last.year year-ABL good-PRF "better than last year"	-gvun	Locative–Prosecutive	moron ghizha-gvun nie uzhe-∅ river bank-PROS one look-IMP; Look along the river.

==== Possession and reflexivity ====
Possession between two noun phrases is expressed by placing the possessor in the genitive case (-ni) before the possessed head noun. Santa also has postposed possessive pronoun clitics and dedicated reflexive/possessive markers.

Word	Alternative forms	Meaning
morei-mini	-miyi, -miy	My horse
morei-matanni	-matayi, -matay	Our (inclusive) horse
morei-bijienni	-bijieyi, -bijiey	Our (exclusive) horse
morei-chini	-chiyi, -chiy	Your horse
morei-tani	(also -tayi, -tay)	Your (plural) horse
morei-ni	—	His/her/their horse

The reflexive markers -ne and -nugvun are affixed to the possessed noun to indicate that the possessor is the subject of the clause (e.g., chi gaga-ne uru "you call your [own] elder brother").

=== Pronoun declension ===
Santa pronouns differentiate between inclusive and exclusive first-person plural, a feature retained despite heavy contact with Mandarin.

1st person
Case	Singular	Plural	
Case	Singular	Exclusive	Inclusive
Nominative	bi / orun (quotation)	bijien	matan / oruntan (quotation)
Genitive-Accusative	mi-ni / nama-ni	bijien-ni	matan-ni / ma-ni
Dative-Locative	nama-de / ma-de	bijien-de	matan-de
Ablative-Comparative	nama-se / ma-se	bijien-se	matan-se
Comitative	nama-le / ma-le	bijien-le	matan-le
Sociative-Instrumental	bi-ghala	bijien-ghala	matan-ghala

2nd person
Case	Singular	Plural
Nominative	chi	ta / tan
Genitive-Accusative	chi-ni	ta-ni
Dative-Locative	chima-de	tan-de
Ablative-Comparative	chima-se / cha-se	tan-se
Comitative	chima-le	tan-le
Sociative-Instrumental	chi-ghala	ta-ghala

3rd person
Case	Singular			Plural		
Nominative	hhe	tere	egven	hhela	terela	egvenla
Genitive-Accusative	hhe	tere	egven	hhesila	teresila	egvesila
Dative-Locative	hhe-ni	tere-ni	egen-ni	hhela-ni	terela-ni	egvenla-ni
Ablative-Comparative	hhe-nde	tere-(n)de / ten-de	egven-de	hhela-de	terela-de	egvenla-de
Comitative	hhe-nse	tere-(n)se	egven-se	hhela-se	terela-se	egvenla-se
Sociative-Instrumental	hhe-nle	tere-le	egven-le	hhela-le	terela-le	egvenla-le

=== Verbal complex ===
The Santa verbal complex distinguishes between finite and non-finite verbs. Finite verbs must occur in sentence-final position and are obligatorily marked for aspect or mood. Non-finite (medial) verbs participate in clause chaining and take switch-event (converbial) markers indicating their temporal, semantic or participant relationship to the main finite verb.

==== Voice ====
Voice marking alters the valency or participant relationship of the verb stem. Santa lacks a morphological active/passive voice distinction, relying instead on causatives and reciprocals.

Particle	Voice	Example
-∅	Active	echi-∅-we go-ACT-PRF "went"
-gva	Causative	bai-gva-we stand-CAUS-PRF "established (caused to stand)"
-ndu	Collective/reciprocal	ijie-ndu-we eat-RECP-PRF "ate together"

==== Finite verbs (Aspect and Mood) ====
Finite verbs mark the absolute endpoint of a sentence and denote aspect instead of tense.

Particle	Category	Example
-we	Perfective aspect	bi baza-de echi-we 1SG Linxia-DAT go-PRF; I have gone to Linxia.
-ne	Imperfective aspect	chi khala echi-ne? 2SG where go-IPFV; Where are you going?
-zhiwe (also -zho)	Progressive aspect	ana-miyi budan gie-zhiwe mother-1SG.POSS meal make-PROG; My mom is cooking.
-∅	Imperative mood	chi ijie-∅ 2SG eat-IMP; You eat.
-ye / -gie	Desiderative mood	matanghala yawu-ye 1PL.INCL.two go-DES; Let's go.

==== Non-finite verbs (Switch-events / Converbs) ====
Medial verbs are used extensively in clause chaining. These suffixes denote whether the subsequent clause represents a simultaneous, sequential, or conditional event.

Particle	Function	Example
-zhi	Simultaneous (same subject)	shira-zhi ijie-we roast-SIM eat-PRF "[I] roasted [it] and ate [it]."
-dene (-de)	Sequential (different event)	chi ijie-dene bi ijie-ye 2SG eat-SEQ 1SG eat-DES "After you eat, I will eat."
-le	Purposive	bi nie uzhe-le ire-we 1SG one look-PURP come-PRF "I came in order to take a look."
-se	Conditional	ghura bao-se bi ulie ire-ne rain fall-COND 1SG IRR.NEG come-IPFV "If it rains, I won't come."
-tala	Terminative (limit)	khara olu-tala wilie gie-we dark become-TERM work do-PRF "[I] worked until it got dark."
-senu	Concessive	eqiemagva bosi-senu shu uzhe-zho morning get.up-CONC book look-PROG "Read a book after getting up in the morning."

==== Deverbal nominalizers ====
Verbs can be nominalized to function as relative clauses or noun phrase arguments.

Particle	Tense/Aspect focus	Example
-san (-sen)	Perfective nominalizer	ene baodei bolu-san-we this wheat become.ripe-P.NM-PRF "This wheat is ripe."
-ku / -wu	Imperfective nominalizer	echi-ku mo gholo-we go-I.NM road long-PRF "The road that needs to be taken is long."
-chin	Progressive nominalizer	enende sao-chin kun wai-nu u-we here live-PR.NM person exist-Q NEG.COP-PRF "Is there anyone living here?"

=== Existential and copula verbs ===
Santa has two existential/locative verbs (bi and wi) and the native copula wo. Due to intensive contact, the Mandarin Chinese copula 是 shì (spelled shi in Santa) has been borrowed and is frequently used alongside or in hybrid equational constructions with the native wo.

Form	bi	wi
Active	bai-ne	wi-we
Past nominalizer	bi-san	wi-san
Future nominalizer	bi-ku	wi-ku
Present nominalizer	bi-chin	wi-chin
Speculative	bi-mu	—
Recollective	bi-lai	—

=== Syntax ===
In common with other Mongolic languages, Dongxiang is traditionally an SOV language. However, in the Linxia dialect area, under intense contact influence of the Mandarin Chinese dialects spoken by the neighbouring Hui people, sentences exhibiting SVO alignment have also been adopted.

While Mongolic languages use nouns natively as measure words, Santa has borrowed Chinese numeral classifiers (such as gie (from Mandarin 个 gè), ganzi, and kozi), producing a hybrid quantifying structure.

=== Numerals ===
While numbers up to ten continue from its native Mongolic roots, numbers above have been heavily supplanted by Mandarin loans. These include 30 (sanshi) and 40 (sishi). For 20, both the native khorun /qʰoˈruŋ/ and the borrowed ershi /ˈɚʂi/ are used.

Numeral	Dongxiang	IPA	Classical Mongolian	Numeral	Dongxiang	IPA	Classical Mongolian
1	nie	/njə/	nigen	11	shiyi	/ʂiji/	arban nigen
2	ghua	/qwɑ/	qoyar	12	shier	/ʂiɚ/	arban qoyar
3	ghuran	/quˈrɑŋ/	ghurban	20	khorun / ershi	/qʰoˈruŋ/ / /ˈɚʂi/	qorin
4	jieron	/t͡ɕjəˈroŋ/	dörben	30	sanshi	/sanʂi/	ghučin
5	tawun	/tʰaˈwuŋ/	tabun	40	sishi	/siʂi/	döčin
6	dzigvon	/t͡ʂiˈʁoŋ/	jirghughan	50	wushi	/wuʂi/	tabin
7	dolon	/toˈloŋ/	dologhan	60	liushi	/liuʂi/	jiran
8	naiman	/nɑjˈmɑŋ/	naiman	70	qishi	/t͡ɕʰiʂi/	dalan
9	yesun	/jəˈsuŋ/	yisün	80	bashi	/paʂi/	nayan
10	hharan	/hɑˈrɑŋ/	arban	90	jiushi	/t͡ɕiuʂi/	yeren

== Writing system ==
Knowledge of Arabic is widespread among the Sarta and as a result, they often use the Arabic script to write down their language informally (cf. the Xiao'erjing system that was used by Hui people); however, this has been little investigated by scholars. As of 2003, the official Latin alphabet for Dongxiang, developed on the basis of the Monguor alphabet, remained in the experimental stage:

Consonants
Letter	IPA	Letter	IPA	Letter	IPA
b	/p/	g	/k/	x	/ɕ/
p	/pʰ/	k	/kʰ/	zh	/t͡ʂ/
m	/m/	gh	/q/	ch	/t͡ʂʰ/
f	/f/	kh	/qʰ/	sh	/ʂ/
d	/t/	h	/x/	z	/t͡s/
t	/tʰ/	gv	/ʁ/	c	/t͡sʰ/
n	/n, ŋ/ (Note: Syllable final, n is pronounced as /n/ before ⟨e⟩ and ⟨i⟩, and /ŋ/ before ⟨a⟩, ⟨o⟩ and ⟨u⟩. Syllable initial is always /n/.)	hh	/h/	s	/s/
l	/l/	j	/t͡ɕ/	w	/w/
r	/r, ʐ/ (Note: r is pronounced as /ʐ/ in Chinese and Arabic loanwords.)	q	/t͡ɕʰ/	y	/j/

Vowels
Letter	IPA	Letter	IPA	Letter	IPA
a	/ɑ/	u	/u/	ie	/jə/
e	/ə/	ai	/ɑj/	iu	/ju/
er	/ɚ/	ei	/əj/	ua	/wɑ/
i (Note: When the preceding consonant is gh, kh, h or gv, this vowel is pronounced the same as ii.)	/i/	ao	/ɑw/	ui	/wəj/
ii	/ɯ/	ou	/əw/	iao	/jɑw/
o	/o/	ia	/jɑ/	uai	/wɑj/

== The Tangwang language ==
There are about 20,000 people in the north-eastern part Dongxiang County, who self-identify as Dongxiang or Hui people who do not speak Dongxiang, but natively speak a Dongxiang-influenced form of Mandarin Chinese. The linguist Mei W. Lee-Smith calls this the "Tangwang language" (Chinese: 唐汪话), based on the names of the two largest villages (Tangjia and Wangjia, parts of Tangwang Town) where it is spoken and argues it is a creolized language. According to Lee-Smith, the Tangwang language uses mostly Mandarin words and morphemes with Dongxiang grammar. Besides Dongxiang loanwords, Tangwang also has a substantial number of Arabic and Persian loanwords.

Like Standard Mandarin, Tangwang is a tonal language, but grammatical particles, which are typically borrowed from Mandarin, but are used in the way Dongxiang morphemes would be used in Dongxiang, do not carry tones.

For example, while the Mandarin plural suffix -men (们) has only very restricted usage (it can be used with personal pronouns and some nouns related to people), Tangwang uses it, in the form -m, universally, the way Dongxiang would use its plural suffix -la. Mandarin pronoun ni (你) can be used in Tangwang as a possessive suffix (meaning "your"). Unlike Mandarin, but like Dongxiang, Tangwang has grammatical cases as well (however only four of them, unlike eight in Dongxiang).

== Bibliography ==
- Bao, Saren (包萨仁) (2006), 从语言接触看东乡语和临夏话的语序变化 [Sequential Changes in Dongxiang Language and Linxia Dialects from the View of Linguistic Contact], Journal of the Second Northwest University for Nationalities (Social Science Edition) (2), ISSN 1008-2883, archived from the original on 2011-07-13
- Cheng, Joyce (2013-05-10), "Dongxiang – people of the northwest", GBTIMES, archived from the original on 2016-04-28
- Field, Kenneth Lynn (1997), A grammatical overview of Santa Mongolian (PDF), PhD dissertation, University of California, Santa Barbara
- Kim, Stephen S. (2003), "Santa", in Janhunen, Juha (ed.), The Mongolic Languages, Routledge Language Family Series, pp. 346–363, ISBN 978-0-203-98791-9
- Lee-Smith, Mei W.; International Council for Philosophy and Humanistic Studies (1996), "The Tangwang language", in Wurm, Stephen A.; Mühlhäusler, Peter; Tyron, Darrell T. (eds.), Atlas of languages of intercultural communication in the Pacific, Asia, and the Americas, Volume 2, Part 1. (Volume 13 of Trends in Linguistics, Documentation Series)., Walter de Gruyter, pp. 875–882, ISBN 978-3-11-013417-9
- People's Daily (2012-08-08), Chinese Ethnic Groups：东乡族（Dōngxiāng zú ）The Dongxiang ethnic minority
