= Monguor language =

Mongolic language of Northwest China

Monguor
- Dēd Mongol, Tu
- moŋɡuer
- Native to: China
- Region: Qinghai, Gansu
- Ethnicity: Monguor
- Native speakers: (150,000 cited 2000 census)
- Language family: Mongolic: Southern Mongolic; Shirongol; Monguor
- Dialects: Mongghul (Huzhu); Mangghuer (Minhe)
- Writing system: Latin script

Language codes
- ISO 639-3: mjg
- Glottolog: tuuu1240
- Glottopedia: Mangghuer

The Monguor language (Chinese: 土族语; pinyin: Tǔzúyǔ; also written Mongour and Mongor) is a Mongolic language of its Shirongolic branch and is part of the Gansu–Qinghai sprachbund (also called the Amdo sprachbund). There are several dialects, mostly spoken by the Monguor people. A writing system was devised for Huzhu Monguor (Mongghul) in the late 20th century but has been little used.

A division into two languages, namely Mongghul in Huzhu Tu Autonomous County and Mangghuer in Minhe Hui and Tu Autonomous County, is considered necessary by some linguists. While Mongghul was under strong influence from Amdo Tibetan, the same holds for Mangghuer and Sinitic languages, and local varieties of Chinese such as the Gangou language were in turn influenced by Monguor.

== Phonology ==
=== Vowels ===
| | Front | Central | Back |
|---|---|---|---|
| Close | i | | u |
| Mid | e | | o |
| Open | | a | |

- Vowel sounds may also be nasalized when preceding a nasal consonant, in different environments.
- Vowels /i, e, u/ may also undergo a devoicing process in certain phonetic environments.

| Phoneme | Allophones | Notes |
|---|---|---|
| /i/ [i] | [ɪ] | in stressed syllables |
| /i/ [i] | [ɨ] | when following alveolar sibilants or affricates |
| /i/ [i] | [ɨ˞] | when following a retroflex consonant |
| /e/ [e] | [ə] | in stressed syllables without onset clusters or coda consonants |
| /e/ [e] | [ɛ] | in a syllable with a palatal onset or palatal coda |
| /e/ [e] | [ə̝] | in a syllable with a nasal coda consonant |
| /a/ [ä] | [ɑ] | in a syllable closed by a velar nasal coda /ŋ/ |
| /a/ [ä] | [ɐ] | before a syllable-final /j/ |
| /a/ [ä] | [æ] | when a syllable is closed by an alveolar nasal /n/ |
| /a/ [ä] | [ɛ] | when following a palatal onset consonant, and preceding an alveolar nasal /n/ |
| /o/ [o] | [ɵ] | may be closer in different environments |
| /u/ [u] | [ʊ] | when in unstressed syllables |
| /u/ [u] | [ʉ] | when following palatal consonants |

=== Consonants ===
| | | Labial | Alveolar | Alveolo- palatal | Retroflex | Palatal | Velar | Uvular |
|---|---|---|---|---|---|---|---|---|
| Plosive | voiceless | p | t | | | | k | q |
| Plosive | aspirated | pʰ | tʰ | | | | kʰ | qʰ |
| Affricate | voiceless | | t͡s | t͡ɕ | t͡ʂ | | | |
| Affricate | aspirated | | t͡sʰ | t͡ɕʰ | t͡ʂʰ | | | |
| Fricative | | f | s | ɕ | ʂ | | | χ |
| Nasal | | m | n | | | | ŋ | |
| Approximant | liquid | | l | | ɻ | | | |
| Approximant | central | | | | | j | w | |

- /χ/ can also be heard as allophones [h] or [x], occurring in free variation.
- /ɻ/ can be heard as a voiced fricative [ʐ] within the onset of a stressed syllable, or of a word-initial syllable. It can also be heard as a flap sound [ɾ] intervocalically in the onset of an unstressed syllable. In a syllable-coda position, it is heard as a rhotic [ə˞] vowel sound.
- /j/ can have a spirantized allophone of [ʝ] strongly in stressed syllables.

== Writing system ==
=== Cyrillic alphabet ===
In 1958, a Cyrillic-based alphabet was developed for Monguor, but its practical use did not begin for political reasons.

The Cyrillic alphabet for Monguor had the following letters:

Letter
| а | а̄ | б | в | г | γ | д | е | е̄ | ж | җ | з | и | ӣ | ј | к | л | м | н | ң | о | о̄ | п | р | с | т | у | ӯ | ф | х | ц | ч | ҷ | ш | щ | э |
IPA
| /a/ | /aː/ | /p/ | /w/ | /k/ | /qʰ/, /q/ | /t/ | /e/ | /eː/ | /t͡ʂ/ | /t͡ɕ/ | /t͡s/ | /i/ | /iː/ | /j/ | /kʰ/ | /l/ | /m/ | /n/ | /ŋ/ | /o/ | /oː/ | /pʰ/ | /r/ | /s/ | /tʰ/ | /u/ | /uː/ | /f/ | /χ/ | /t͡sʰ/ | /t͡ʂʰ/ | /t͡ɕʰ/ | /ʂ/ | /ɕ/ | /ə/ |

=== Latin alphabet ===
From the 1970s to the 1980s, the current Latin alphabet for Monguor based on Pinyin was developed. It consists of 31 letters.

The following list shows the letters of the Monguor Latin alphabet along with their pronunciation in the IPA:

- A a (/a/)
- B b (/p/)
- C c (/tsʰ/)
- D d (/t/)
- E e (/e/)
- F f (/f/)
- G g (/k/)
- H h (/χ/)
- I i (/i/)
- J j (/tɕ/)
- K k (/kʰ/)
- L l (/l/)
- M m (/m/)
- N n (/n/)
- O o (/o/)
- P p (/pʰ/)
- Q q (/tɕʰ/)
- R r (/ɻ/)
- S s (/s/)
- T t (/tʰ/)
- U u (/u/)
- W w (/w/)
- X x (/ɕ/)
- Y y (/j/)
- Z z (/ts/)
- Zh zh (/tʂ/)
- Ch ch (/tʂʰ/)
- Sh sh (/ʂ/)
- Ng ng (/ŋ/)
- Gh gh (/q/)
- Kh kh (/qʰ/)

The letter V is not used. Long vowels are written with double vowel letters.

== Numerals ==
Mongolian numerals such as the following are only in use in the Mongghul dialect, while Mangghuer speakers have switched to counting in Chinese. Note that while the Mongolian script has only arban for 'ten', Middle Mongolian *harpa/n including *h can be reconstructed from the scripts.

| Numeral | Classical Mongolian | Monguor |
|---|---|---|
| 1 | nigen | nige |
| 2 | qoyar | ghoori |
| 3 | ghurban | ghuran |
| 4 | dörben | deeran |
| 5 | tabun | tawun |
| 6 | jirghughan | jirighun |
| 7 | dologhan | duluun |
| 8 | naiman | niiman |
| 9 | yisün | shdzin |
| 10 | arban | haran |
