= Tuoba language =

Extinct 5th-century language of northern China

Tuoba
- T'opa
- Tabγač, Taγbač
- Native to: Tuoba
- Region: Northern China and Mongolia
- Ethnicity: Tuoba
- Era: 5th century
- Language family: Unclassified language Mongolic (or Para-Mongolic)? Turkic?: Tuoba
- Writing system: Serbi script

Language codes
- ISO 639-3: None (mis)
- Glottolog: None

Tuoba (Tabγač or Tabghach; also Taγbač or Taghbach; Chinese: 拓跋) is an extinct language spoken by the Tuoba people in northern China around the 5th century AD during the Northern Wei dynasty. It has variously been considered to be of (Para-)Mongolic or Turkic affiliations.

== Classification ==
There is no consensus on the classification of the Tuoba language and it has been identified as either a Mongolic language or a Turkic language. No Tuoba texts have survived and the only sources for the Tuoba language are glosses scattered in Chinese texts. According to the Book of the Later Han, "the language and culture of the Xianbei are the same as the Wuhuan".

With the exception of Shiratori Kurakichi (1912, 1913), who was the first to claim Tuoba as a Mongolian language, most scholars during the first half of the 20th century such as Peter A. Boodberg, Louis Bazin, Gerard Clauson, René Grousset, Paul Pelliot and Wolfram Eberhard believed that the Tuoba people and language were primarily Turkic with perhaps some Mongolic admixture. This lasted until the 1970s when Lajos Ligeti argued that both the Xianbei and Tuoba languages were actually Mongolic due to the existence of obvious Mongolic cognates. Pulleyblank was favorable to Ligeti's argument and concluded in 1983 that the classification was sound while noting that there were probably Turkic and non-Mongolian elements integrated into the Tuoba confederacy. This was followed by another agreement from Gerhard Doerfer in 1992.

In 1996, Juha Janhunen proposed that the Tuoba might have spoken an Oghur Turkic language. However in 2003, Janhunen and Claus Schönig both came to the conclusion that the Tuoba language was Mongolic and its identification as Turkic was incorrect. Janhunen says that this mistake was partly caused by the existence of Turkic names and titles, but these were widespread cultural words in Central and East Asia. Schönig states that due to advances in research on Khitan language, the Mongolic or Para-Mongolic identity of the Xianbei and Tuoba was becoming more evident. Schönig points out that the first identifiable layer of Mongolic loanwords entering Turkic languages is dated to the Xianbei period when the linguistic flow of Turkic into Mongolic was at least partly reversed.

In 2005, Chen Sanping used new evidence from Tuoba onomastic data to argue that the core Tuoba clans likely spoke a Turkic language. Chen's argument for a Turkic Tuoba language has received pushback from a number of scholars including Alexander Vovin, Stephen G. Haw, and Chen Hao. Vovin criticized Chen for his lack of examples and blamed him for reviving the idea that the Tuoba language was Turkic. Vovin used new reconstructions of Early middle Chinese to study the Tuoba language and found that it shared unique similarities to the Manchu language such as the initial consonant m- that does not exist in Turkic languages. In 2012, Chen expanded on his argument by reiterating the onomastic data and separating the Tuoba into core clans that were Turkic and non-core clans that were Mongolic. However, a review of Chen's 2012 work by Haw found his new argument for a Turkic Tuoba language to be unconvincing. In 2020, Chen Hao also voiced opposition to Chen Sanping's argument for a Turkic Tuoba language.

Other more recent works by An-King Lim (2016, 2023) classifies Tuoba as a Turkic language, while Andrew Shimunek (2017) classifies Tuoba as a "Serbi" (i.e., para-Mongolic) language. Shimunek's Serbi branch also consists of the Tuyuhun and Khitan languages. In 2022, Holcombe stated that the scholarly opinion has shifted in favor of the Tuoba language as Mongolic.

A number of Chinese authors such as Zhu Xueyuan (2000), Wuqilatu (2002), and Luo Xin (2009) regard the Xianbei language as Mongolic or proto-Mongolic. Liu Xueyao argues that the Tuoba may have had their own language that was only broadly Ural-Altaic and should not be assumed to be identical with any other known languages.

== Morphology ==
Some functional suffixes are:

- *-A(y) ~ *ʁa(y) ‘verbal noun suffix’
- *-Al ~ *-l ‘deverbal noun suffix’
- **čɪ ~ **či ‘suffix denoting occupations’ <cognates with Turkic suffix "-či"
- **-mɔr/-mʊr (萬) ‘deverbal noun suffix’ <cognates with Turkic suffix "-mur"
- **-n ‘plural suffix’

== Lexicon ==
Selected basic Taghbach words from Shimunek (2017) are listed below. Forms reconstructed using the comparative method are marked with one asterisk (*), while forms reconstructed according to the Chinese fanqie spellings and/or rhymes of the traditional Chinese philological tradition are marked with two asterisks (**) (originally marked as ✩ by Shimunek 2017).

Taghbach (reconstructed form)	Taghbach (original Chinese transcription)	English meaning	Original Chinese gloss
*agyɪl ~ *agɪl	屋引	house	房
*čʰɪrnɔ	叱奴	wolf	狼
**dɪʁa	地何	writing, book, document	書
**ɦatśir̃	阿真	food	飲食
*ɦorbǝl	嗢盆	warmth	溫
*ɪrgɪn	俟懃	above, superior	尚
**kʰɪl-	乞	to speak	-
**kʰɪr-	契	to kill someone	殺人
**kʰɪrʁayčɪn	契害真	assassins	殺人者
*ñaqañ	若干	dog	狗
*pary-al	拔列	bridge	梁
**pʰatala	破多羅	rice water	潘
*qɔw/*qəw	侯	pig, boar	亥
**tʰaʁ	托	dirt, soil, earth	土
*tʰʊʁnar	土難	mountain	山
**tʰʊʁay	吐奚	ancient	古
*uwl/*ʊwl	宥連	cloud	雲
*yirtʊqañ/*yirtʊqan	壹斗眷	bright	明
*žirpəŋ	是賁	raised earth, embankment	封
**žiʁlʊ	是樓	high, tall	高
