= Balhae controversies =

East Asian historiographic dispute

The Balhae controversies involve disputes between China, Korea, Japan, and Russia, countries that have conducted studies on the historical state of Balhae (Bohai, Po-hai, Parhae). The Korean perspective generally considers Balhae to be the successor state of Goguryeo and part of the Northern and Southern States period of Korean history, while Chinese scholars generally consider Balhae to be a state of the Mohe people, a Tungusic ethnic group, and subordinate to the Tang dynasty (618–907). In Russian historiography, Balhae is recognized as the first highly organized independent state formation of the Tungus-Manchurian peoples.

== Background ==
Balhae (698–926) is a kingdom that has been studied and debated in East Asia since the early 20th century. Central to the issue of scholarship since the 1960s is whether or not Balhae belongs to Korean or Chinese national history. Arguments based on the identity and essential features of Balhae have been made by contemporary states to confirm or question territorial claims by present governments. Academic disputes over the identity of Goguryeo and Balhae are commonly linked to claims in international relations discourse on the legitimacy of the present Sino-Korean border.

The general positions of state actors involved in the Balhae dispute:

Koreas:

- Balhae was a "Korean" state founded by the descendants of Goguryeo and that Balhae and Unified Silla constituted the "Northern and Southern Dynasties." Korean and Japanese scholars assert that Balhae was the successor state to Goguryeo, continuing its multi-ethnic and multicultural traditions.

China:

- Balhae was a local polity founded by the "Mohe nationality", subordinate to the Tang dynasty. Both Chinese and Russian scholars agree that the rulers of Balhae were Mohe tribespeople.

Soviet Union/Russia:

- Balhae was an independent kingdom, referred to as the 'flourishing kingdom of the east'. It was created by a union of Mohe peoples who are the ancestors of tribal groups in Russian territory.

Japan:

- Early Japanese scholarship in the Empire of Japan placed Balhae within "Manchurian history" with no connection to Goguryeo or Korea, and was independent from the Tang dynasty. Starting in the 1930s and especially after cutting ties with the People's Republic of China in 1949, the view that Balhae was part of Korean history became the dominant position among Japanese scholarship. Since the 1980s, Japan has moved away from trying to identify a single ethnicity in favor of research on Balhae's government. They espouse the view that Balhae was founded by remnant Goguryeo military nobles who dominated a commoner class of Mohe peoples.

== Balhae as Korean ==
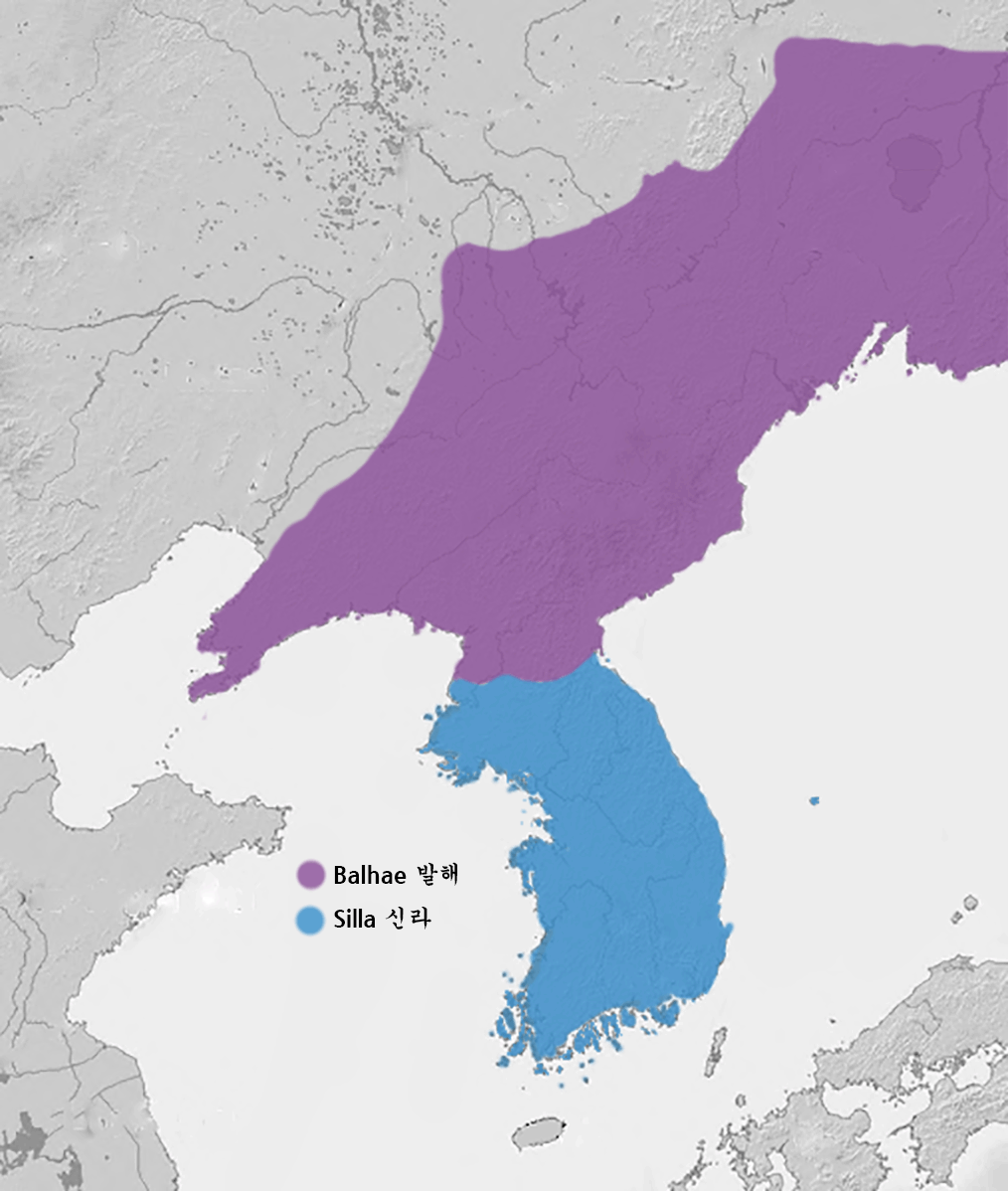
The Northern and Southern States period in 830

=== Goryeo ===
Goryeo (918–1392) did not write an official history for Balhae, and some modern scholars argue that had they done so, Koreans might have had a stronger claim to Balhae's history and territory. Korea's earliest surviving historical record, the Samguk sagi (History of the Three Kingdoms), was written by Kim Pusik (1075–1151), a direct descendant of the ruling Silla dynasty. Silla was known to have held a hostile attitude towards Balhae, which might explain the exclusion of Balhae from the first complete compilation of Korean History. Although Goryeo did not compile an official history for Balhae, a great portion of the royalty and aristocracy fled to Goryeo, including its Crown Prince Dae Gwang-hyeon.

A text known as the Jodaegi allegedly written by a Balhae refugee contained records of Balhae's history but was lost during the literary purges of Sejo of Joseon in the 15th century and only fragments remain. Snippets of its contents are recorded in the Taebaek Ilsa, part of the Hwandan Gogi compiled by Gye Yeon-su in 1911. However, most scholars from South Korea, North Korea and Japan believe that the Hwandan Gogi is a forgery and that its content is unreliable. The Hwandan Gogi and other texts like the Tan'gi kosa attributed to the brother of the founder of Balhae and the Kyuwǒn sawa attributed to Pug’ae no’in of the 17th century were likely written in the 1920s.

The first inclusion of Balhae in Korean history was in the Chewang un'gi (Songs of Emperors and Kings), a two volume historical saga written in the form of rhyming poetry by Goryeo scholar and court official Yi Sŭnghyu. It was completed in 1287 during the late Goryeo dynasty. Volume one of the Chewang un'gi covers the history of China to the Jurchen Jin dynasty. Volume two is called the Tongguk kunwang kaeguk yǒndae (Founding Era of Eastern Monarchs), covering the history of Korea in two parts. The first part covers the period from the legendary Tan'gun to Balhae while the second part covers the history of Goryeo from its founding to the reign of King Chungnyeol (r. 1274–1298).

According to Myungkyung University Professor Lee Sooyoung, Yi was motivated to write the Chewang un'gi due to both the internal political turmoil of the Goryeo court as well as the Yuan dynasty's interference in Goryeo politics during the period of Mongol rule. Yi wrote the Chewang un'gi in 1280 while he was exiled for criticizing the pro-Yuan clique in court. He sent his work to King Chungnyeol in 1287 hoping that it would cause a change in the king's policies. Stella Xu notes that Yi's work was much more inclusive than his contemporaries in his portrayal of ancient Korean history in an "effort to establish an unbroken lineage of Korean history". In addition to including Balhae, which had been neglected or even held in contempt by his peers, as part of Korean history, the Chewang un'gi is also the first time that the legendary figure Tan'gun was established as the common ancestor of all Korean people despite the existence of separate ancestor myths in Buyeo, Goguryeo, and Silla. The Chewang un'gi is considered important as it is the first history book to record the history of Balhae as Korean history, and has been cited by both North and South Korean scholars.

=== Joseon ===
A growing interest in Manchuria and Balhae during the middle Joseon (1393–1910) period was caused by increasing concern with territorial issues in the north. Following the Qing invasion of Joseon (1636-1637), Hyojong of Joseon lived as a hostage for seven years in Mukden (Shenyang). He planned an invasion of the Qing dynasty called Bukbeol (Korean: 북벌; Hanja: 北伐; lit. 'northern expedition') during his ten years on the Joseon throne, though the plan died with his death on the eve of the expedition. The northern expedition spurred a rising concern with the northern territory among Joseon literati. The location of the Four Commanderies of Han became tied to support for or against the northern expedition. Scholars who argued against the northern expedition situated all Four Commanderies within the Korean Peninsula while those who argued for the expedition situated them outside the peninsula but still within the former territory of Old Chosŏn. This framework of the Four Commanderies as both outside the Korean Peninsula but within Old Chosŏn's former territory lent support to a possible invasion of Manchuria and Liaodong (Yodong) by justifying it as recovering the lost lands of Old Chosŏn. A nostalgia grew for these lands covering Manchuria and Liaodong as part of Old Chosŏn. At the same time, the Pukhak (Northern Learning Scholars) discovered on their trips to Qing China that rather than the stereotypical image of a barbarian dynasty, the Qing had continued to refine Chinese civilization. These strands of interest in the north and Manchuria led to new interpretations of ancient history, particularly with regards to the northern lineage of Korean history.

Some scholars such as Seongho Yi Ik (1681–1763) and An Jeongbok (1712–1791) continued to place Balhae outside the confines of Korean history while Sin Gyeongjun, Pak Chiwŏn (1737–1805), Yu Deuk-gong (1749–1807), and Yi Gyu-gyeong (b. 1788) fully incorporated it. Pak denied the fact that the Han dynasty's territories extended south of the Yalu River, and criticized Kim Pusik for excluding Balhae in Manchuria from the history of Korea, arguing that the people of Balhae were "descendants" of Goguryeo. Yi argued that the exclusion of Balhae from Korean history was "a grave error" since "it occupied a vast area". Yu blamed the decline of Joseon on the loss of Manchuria. In Yu's Balhaego (Treatise on Balhae), he argued that Balhae should be included as part of Korean history and proposed a new periodization for Korean history in which the Nambukguk sidae ('South–north states period') replaced the Unified Silla period (668–935). Yu argued vehemently that the founders of Balhae were Goguryeo people and that they inherited the territory of Goguryeo, making it the legitimate successor state. While Yu's emphasis on the north and Manchuria was followed up by other authors such as Yi Chonghwi (1731–1797) in his Tongsa (Eastern History), published in 1803, the idea of a "South-North State" period was ignored until the 1970s.

This emphasis on northern states associated with Korea's remote past featured prominently in unofficial outlines of Korean history in the latter half of the 18th century. Texts such as the Tongsa shifted the emphasis away from Silla towards Goguryeo, Buyeo, and Balhae. In Joseon's later years, increasing numbers of Korean historians included Balhae in Korean history, despite acknowledging that the state's founders were the Mohe people and not considered to be "us." A century later, Han Chiyun and Han Jinseo included Balhae as equal in Korean history to such uncontroversially Korean dynasties like Silla.

=== Colonial period ===
Sin Chaeho (1880–1936) criticized the Samguk sagi for excluding Balhae and Buyeo (Chinese: Fuyu, another state in Manchuria) from Korean history. Sin also criticized the author, Kim Pusik, for claiming that Silla had achieved the unification of Korea because of Balhae's concurrent existence. Writing about Jiandao in the early 20th century, he bemoaned that for centuries, Korean people in their "hearts and eyes considered only the land south of the Yalu River as their home." He interpreted Balhae's defeat by the Khitan-led Liao dynasty (916–1125) as having caused "half of our ancestor Dangun's ancient lands... loss for over nine hundred years". He lionized historical Goguryeo figures like Ŭlchi Mundŏk and Yŏn Kaesomun for defeating Chinese invasions while denouncing leaders in Silla for requesting help from the Tang dynasty to conquer their fellow Koreans in Paekche and Goguryeo. This effectively reframed Korean historical developments based on their contributions to maintaining territory in Manchuria.

Inspired by ideas of Social Darwinism, Sin wrote:

How intimate is the connection between Korea and Manchuria? When the Korean race obtains Manchuria, the Korean race is strong and prosperous. When another race obtains Manchuria, the Korean race is inferior and recedes. Moreover, when in the possession of another race, if that race is the northern race, then Korea enters that northern race's sphere of power. If an eastern race obtains Manchuria, then Korea enters that race's sphere of power. Alas! This is an iron rule that has not changed for four thousand years.

Other individuals in the late Joseon and colonial period were even more expansive in their view of Korean history. Kim Kyohǒn (1868-1923) wrote the Sindan silgi (Veritable Records of the Sacred Sandalwood Tree) and the Sindan minsa (History of the Sacred Sandalwood People) in 1914 under Japanese occupation. At that point Manchuria's importance to Korea had increased even further as it had become the base of the Korean independence movement. Consequently, Kim put forward the idea that all inhabitants of Manchuria were descendants of Tan'gun. In addition to Balhae, Kim also incorporated the Khitan Liao and Jurchen Jin dynasties into the lineage of Korean history. Nationalist historians expanded the ethnic genealogies of Korean people to include Balhae as well as ethnic groups like the Xianbei, Sushen, Mohe, Jurchens, and Manchus.

=== Modern scholars ===
North Korean scholars—and more recently, some in the South—have incorporated Balhae history as an integral part of Korean history by challenging the view of Unified Silla (668–935) as the unification of Korea. According to this narrative, Goryeo was the first unification of Korea, since Balhae still existed while occupying former Goguryeo territory north of the Korean peninsula. In the 1960s, the North Korean scholar Pak Se-yong advanced arguments that claimed Balhae as "a part of Korean history." Central to the argument was Balhae's place as "a state founded by people of Koguryŏ" and its territory as composed of most of the "former territory of Koguryŏ and an expansive, newly-acquired portion." Pak made broader claims on the continuity of Balhae with modern Korea, contending that "bloodline and culture are an important component of the bloodlines and cultural traditions of the Korean race."

In South Korea, Chu Yŏnghŏn advocated a Korean identity for Balhae based on findings of joint Chinese-North Korean archaeological excavations in the 1960s. These efforts led to the incorporation of Balhae into Korean history as part of the "Northern and Southern Dynasties", a theory revived by Yi Usǒng in the 1970s, based on instances in which the Silla court referred to Balhae as the "northern court." Acceptance of this new narrative was not immediate. In 1981, a South Korean scholar called the Northern-Southern Dynasties an "interesting new interpretation" and as late as 1990, there was still no consensus. However, by now the Northern-Southern Dynasties paradigm is widely accepted in South Korean academia. According to Kim Eun Gug, the adoption of this position was necessary to counter Chinese claims on Goguryeo and Balhae as part of Chinese history as well as to provide a model for North and South Korea's unification. Kim openly declared that, "We have a national responsibility to develop a response to China's Northeast Project and its claims that Koguryŏ and Parhae belong to Chinese history."

Some Japanese scholarship from the mid-1930s to the early postwar period also supported placing Balhae within Korean history. This position was advanced mostly prominently by Mikami Tsugio and became very popular after Japan severed diplomatic ties with the People's Republic of China in 1949. In the 1980s, Japanese scholars scrutinized new archaeological evidence from China in the hopes of clarifying Balhae's ethnic identity. However, since then, the majority of Japanese scholars have moved away from seeking a singular ethnic paradigm for Balhae and instead focus on local government mechanisms and their relationship with central authority. According to Park Jin Suk, Japan no longer has any territorial interests in Balhae and its scholars offer a more objective position.

According to historian Richard McBride, Japanese scholars generally agree with Korean scholars that the ruling elites of Balhae were remnant Goguryeo military nobles who dominated a commoner class of Malgal people, and assert that Balhae was the successor state of Goguryeo. Pamela Kyle Crossley states that "Balhae as a language, people and state with diverse origins was without doubt part of a spectrum that included Goguryeo, Buyeo and Baekje and was closely connected with the development of medieval Korea." Mark E. Byington noted that neither Korean or Chinese historians have consistently viewed Balhae as a "Korean" or "Chinese" polity, but he considered it to be culturally closer to Korea than to China.

== Balhae as Chinese ==
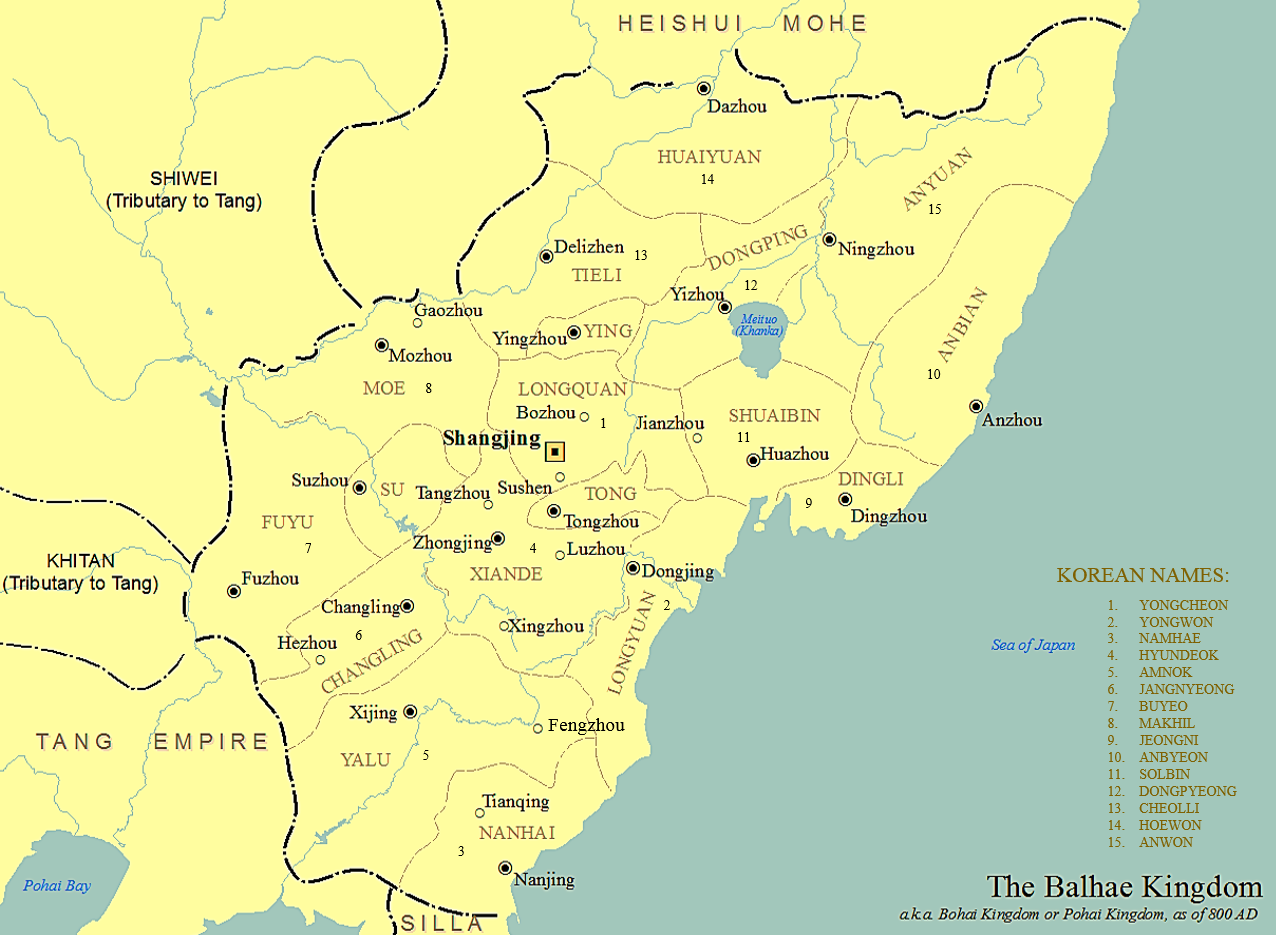
Administrative divisions of Balhae with Chinese and Korean names

=== Jurchens and Manchus ===
Modern Chinese historians consider Bohai's history to be an important aspect of the history of Manchuria and therefore "Chinese history" in a broad sense. Historically, the Jurchens (later renamed the Manchus), believed they shared ancestry with the Mohe. According to the History of Jin, a text covering the history of the Jurchen-led Jin dynasty (1115–1234), the Jin founder Emperor Taizu of Jin once sent ambassadors to Bohai people living in the Liao dynasty (916–1125) to convince them to rebel against the Liao. He claimed that "the Jurchens and Bohai were originally of the same family" (女直渤海本同一家) and that they were "actually one family, because in origin they were consisted of seven Wuji tribes." The distinction between Bohai and Jurchen rebellions was not always clear to the Liao. In the 1117 epitaph of a Han officer named Meng Chu (jinshi 1083), who died while fighting against Jurchens in 1114, the Bohai and Jurchens were mentioned in connection to each other, and the wording suggests that they occupied a similar category of "unsavory coastal peoples" to Liao observers.

Classical Chinese

建州毛怜则渤海大氏遗孽，乐住种，善缉纺，饮食服用，皆如华人，自长白山迤南，可拊而治也。

English

The (people of) Chien-chou and Mao-lin [YLSL always reads Mao-lien] are the descendants of the family Ta of Po-hai. They love to be sedentary and sow, and they are skilled in spinning and weaving. As for food, clothing, and utensils, they are the same as (those used by) the Chinese. (Those living) south of the Ch'ang-pai mountain are apt to be soothed and governed.

— Wei Huan, Huang ming jiu bian kao Juan 2 "Liao dong zhen bian yi kao" 据魏焕《皇明九边考》卷二《辽东镇边夷考》 Translation from Sino-J̌ürčed relations during the Yung-Lo period, 1403–1424 by Henry Serruys

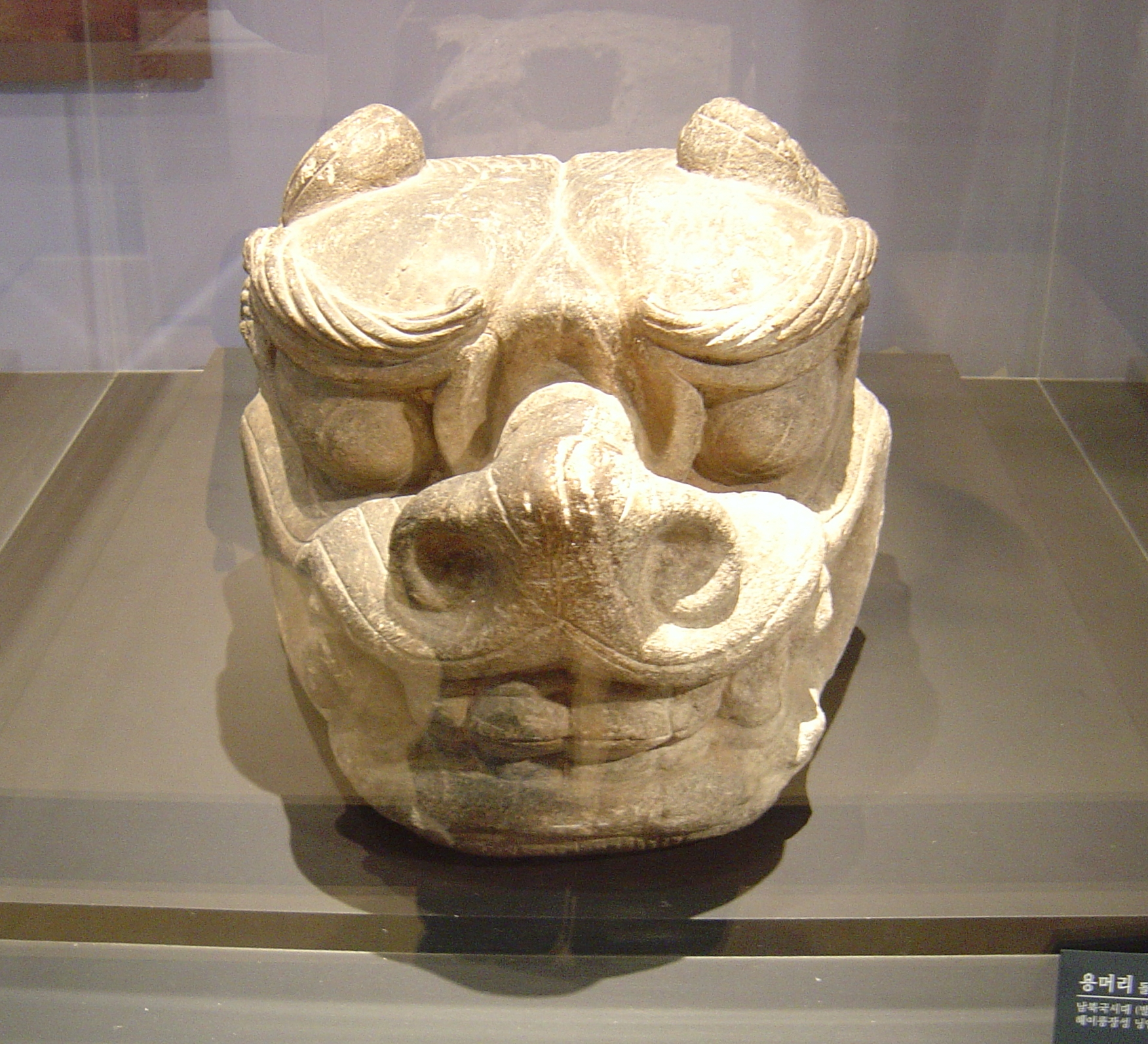
A dragon head artifact from Bohai at the National Museum of Korea.

Archaeological materials from the Anan'evskoe site show material evidence of ancestral relations between the Jurchens and Bohai people. Several South Korean scholars believe that after Bohai's destruction in 926, Bohai's population was divided into two groups. Influential Bohai families were sent to the inner part of the Liao dynasty and were referred to as Bohai people, while those who remained under indirect management were called Jurchen. Han Ciu-cheol argues that Jurchens could be considered part of Korean history. Soviet and Russian scholars agree there were hereditary relationships between Mohe and Jurchen and that the Bohai population certainly contributed culturally to the ethnogenesis of the Jurchen. However, some differences remain. The Bohai refugee population was received well in Goryeo while they had a combative relationship with the Jurchens. Goryeo once massacred the ambassador and leaders of a Jurchen delegation during peace talks. They sent an official complaint about the Jurchens to the Song dynasty, calling them greedy liars and other insulting names. The Jurchens described Goryeo people as enemies and often came into military conflict with them. The Jurchen and Bohai people also differed in their level of technological and societal sophistication. Chinese sources describe the Jurchens as lacking law, governors, kings, or dignitaries. Prior to the reign of Wanyan Wugunai (1021–1074), in the early 11th century, the Jurchens could not produce iron armor and had to trade for it from other tribes.

In 1778, the Qianlong Emperor of the Qing dynasty reviewed various history books and commissioned a new comprehensive history of the Manchus, the Researches on Manchu Origins (Manchu: ᠮᠠᠨᠵᡠᠰᠠᡳ
ᡩᠠ
ᠰᡝᡴᡳᠶᡝᠨ ‍‍ᡳ
ᡴᡳᠮᠴᡳᠨ
ᠪᡳᡨᡥᡝ, Möllendorff: Manjusai da sekiyen-i kimcin bithe, Abkai: Manjusai da sekiyen-i kimqin bithe; Chinese: 滿洲源流考; pinyin: Mǎnzhōu Yuánliú Kǎo). Part of this endeavor was to create a new imperial history of Manchus that was glorious in its own right and not a frontier imitation of Chinese civilization. This new history placed their Jin ancestors, the Jin imperial clan, among the population of the Mohe, who lived in the Changbai Mountains and along the Amur. Qianlong repeatedly made references to the Bohai as the origin of various organizational features such as the use of "the five-capitals, a writing system, and a leadership hierarchy that he believed was evident in early Qing history and still in use among Northeastern peoples."

Richard McBride states that the Heishui Mohe evolved into the Jurchens who conquered northern China and established the Jin Dynasty (1115-1234). They later renamed themselves the Manchu and established the Qing Dynasty. Finnish linguist Juha Janhunen argues that it is possible that the Goguryeo language could have been an Amuric language related to today's Nivkh language isolate.

=== People's Republic of China ===
Since 1949, the People's Republic of China has depicted the country as a multi-ethnic state and endeavored to create unity among the country's various minorities to strengthen the nation as a unified construct. According to this narrative, Chinese scholarship has generally characterized Bohai as a "local polity of a minority nationality" subordinate to Tang rule and that the history of Bohai belongs to China. Only in the 1980s did the study of the Bohai become a major enterprise in China. In the mid-2000s, Bohai studies received a new impetus from the Northeast Project. The project was seen by South Korean scholars as a concerted political effort to "contest the role of Koguryŏ and Parhae" as part of Korean history. There was concern that China would seek recognition from UNESCO. Park Jin Suk argues that "the Chinese position has been solidified" by the Northeast Project and now presents a united front against other historical interpretations. Although a standard Chinese position never actually developed and contradictions within Chinese scholars remain, there are no Chinese authors advocating Bohai as Korean.

Chinese research was described as focusing "solely on the relationship between Parhae and Tang, leading to the conclusion that Parhae was only a local government dependent in every respect on Tang." Such an assessment is no longer entirely true as Chinese scholarship now pays more attention to Bohai's relationship with other polities. A recent Chinese introduction to the topic categorized Bohai's diplomatic exchanges with the Tang as a "relationship between cultures" while other diplomatic actions were "foreign relations". According to Lei Yijie, Bohai was a "local ethnic polity" ruled by the Tang. Kaneko Shūichi notes that the Tang treated Bohai and Silla the same. Formally, they were "prefectures under loose rule" (jimizhou). In 713, the Tang court granted Da Zuorong the post of Commander-in-Chief (dudu) of Huhan Prefecture, the Tang name for Bohai's capital. In practice, it is hard for Chinese dynasties to claim any state as independent under the "tribute model." This problem is exhibited by states such as Silla, Goryeo, and Joseon, all of which had less political autonomy than Bohai but are not claimed as Chinese. Epigraphic evidence shows that the rulers of Bohai considered themselves emperors and empresses. In communications between Bohai and the Japanese court, Bohai's ruler referred to himself as "Grandson of Heaven" and portrayed the relationship between himself and the ruler of Japan as uncle to nephew. Sakayori Masashi believes this was meant to express his superiority in a "Sinocentric worldview" centered on Bohai and to claim sovereignty over Silla and the Mohe tribes.

An earlier, opposing view comes from Chinese Prime Minister Zhou Enlai, who said in 1963 that Korean people have lived in the northeastern region of China since ancient times and excavated relics prove that Bohai is a branch of ancient Korea. The former Chinese premier's remarks have been made public through a document entitled "Premier Zhou Enlai's Dialogue on Sino-Korean Relations."

=== Historical sites ===
China is accused of limiting Korean archaeologists access to historical sites located within Liaoning and Jilin. Starting from 1994, increasing numbers of South Korean tourists began to visit Goguryeo archaeological sites in China and often engaged in nationalistic displays. China perceived this as a threat and restricted foreign access to Goguryeo sites. This perception was aggravated by a series of tomb robberies and vandalism at several of these archaeological sites between 1995 and 2000. South Korean archeologist Song Ki-ho, a noted professor at Seoul National University who has published several papers criticizing the Chinese government's interpretation of Bohai 's history, made several visits to China in the 1990s, 2000, 2003, and 2004, examining several historical sites and museums. However, he found himself restricted by limitations on note-taking and photography and was even ejected from several sites by museum employees.

== Balhae as Manchurian ==
The placement of Balhae within Manchurian history was advanced by Japanese scholarship as their political and military interests grew after the First Sino-Japanese War in 1895. The Manchurian framework emphasized the distinctiveness of Balhae culture compared to Tang China, Goguryeo, and Silla. The Japanese archaeologist Komai Kazuchika led the excavation of Balhae's Supreme Capital in 1933–1934. In his draft of a "Cultural History of Manchuria," the first ruler of Balhae was described as "a ruler of the Sumo Mohe" with no connection to Korea or Goguryeo and independent of the Tang dynasty. However this view of Balhae declined during the mid-1930s when Japanese scholars such as Mikami Tsugio started to describe Balhae as part of Korean history. This view became even more dominant after Japan cut diplomatic ties with China in 1949. In the 1980s, Japanese scholars scrutinized for archaeological evidence from China to identify Balhae's ethnicity, however since then Japan has moved away from seeking a "single ethnicity" for Balhae in favor of researching the relationship between local and central governance. They espouse the view that Balhae was founded by remnant Goguryeo military nobles who dominated a commoner class of Mohe peoples.

== Russian position ==
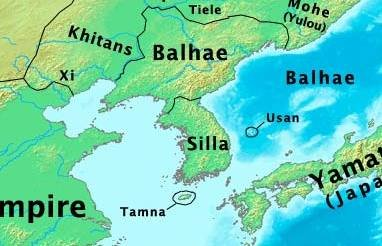
Bohai at the time of maximum expansion in the 9th century (according to Russian archaeological research).

In traditional Russian historiography, Bohai is recognized as the first organized state of the Tungus-Manchurian peoples. Other Russian scholars argue that they cannot determine the ethnic composition of Bohai with great precision as no materials have been found that can conclusively confirm the opinion of either the Chinese or the Korean side. Shavkunov has proposed that ancient Ainu-speaking and Nivh-speaking tribes, as well as Turkic-speaking people, may also have been part of the Bohai population, in addition to the traditionally recognized inhabitants of Bohai (Koguryo and Mohe). E. V. Shavkunov believes that Bohai's population also consisted of elements from Central Asia such as Sogdians and Tocharians. Many Uyghurs fled to Bohai after the destruction of the Uyghur Khaganate in 840 but they failed to adapt to Bohai society and caused social unrest.

On the territory of Russia, over 130 years, 18 small objects (detached farm, a watchtower, a smithy far outside village, etc.), 19 villages, and 7 cities of this state have been studied. Also, in Russian academic science there are other data on the borders of this state than in Korea and China.

According to Associate Professor Alexander Kim from Vladivostok State University, Bohai studies were not left outside the politically-driven polemics during the era of the Sino-Soviet split. Soviet scholars wrote extensively about the war between the Tang Empire and the state of Bohai, paying great attention to the victories of the Bohai forces and emphasizing the independence of the state, while at the same time trying to downplay the results of the war, which made Bohai re-confirm its inferior position vis-a-vis the Tang Empire in the tributary system.

Russian Archeologists found in the area an Abbasid drachma from Central Asia which may indicate an economy in which foreign currency may have been used. The archeologists laid stress on the argument that the absence of an independently developed coinage is not sufficient evidence to deny that the Bohai state existed as an independent state.

Alexander L'vovich Ivliev stresses that Bohai students are mentioned in Chinese sources (e.g. New Book of Tang) to have sat for the bingongke (賓貢科) exam, which was a special category of exams designed for foreign students and envoys, indicating that to the Tang officials, the students were subjects of other states as opposed to subjects of the Tang realm.

== Subjects of contention ==
=== Ethnicity ===
The ethnicity of Balhae's population is the most widely debated topic in the debate over its historical identity. The generally held position by most scholars is that Balhae society was separated into two ethnic components: descendants of Goguryeo and Mohe tribal groups. However, within this paradigm exists a number of different views on the relationship of the two groups.

Korean scholarship and history textbooks teach that "the ruling class of Parhae were persons of Koguryŏ origins and that the people over whom they ruled were the Malgal, a people whose ethnic origins were different from Koguryŏ." This Korean framework portrays Balhae as a country, state, and government founded and dominated by Goguryeo people, an ethnic group equivalent to modern Koreans. The ethnic identity of the rulers is the overriding identity marker of Balhae, placing it within Korean history. Chŏn Hoch'ŏn characterizes Balhae and the peninsular Korean state of Silla as possessing "the same ethnicity." Song Ki-ho and No T'aedon argue that the Mohe were Tungusic people who had been assimilated into Goguryeo and Balhae, thereby making the Mohe part of Korean history. Under Song's framework for Balhae's ethnicity, Tae Choyŏng was a "Koguryŏ person of Sumo Mohe ancestry” and Balhae was an ancestor kingdom of modern Korean states regardless of the ethnicity of the ruling house. No is of the opinion that seeking a single ethnic origin for Balhae and linking it to any modern nationality is an exercise in futility. A few scholars in Korea, such as Han Ciu-cheol, argue that there was no difference between the Goguryeo and Mohe population and that they were the same ethnicity. Mohe was used as a pejorative term for the lower class. In the same vein, Jang Guk-jong argues that Mohe tribes in Balhae were not Mohe but part of Goguryeo's provincial population.

In China, the Mohe are generally considered the "main ethnicity" while Goguryeo descendants occupy a secondary minority position. Based on the New Book of Tang, Chinese scholars argue that Balhae's founders were from the Sumo Mohe tribe centered on the Songhua River.

In 1915, Tsuda Sōkichi noted that Tang sources describe the Baishan Mohe as more closely allied to Goguryeo while the Sumo were actually in conflict with Goguryeo. Li Jiancai argues that based on this finding, the founder of Balhae, Dae Joyeong or Da Zuorong, was more likely to have been from the Baishan tribe. This position has been adopted by a number of Chinese scholars but remains marginal. Another marginal position presented by Sun Jinji argues that Balhae was not just Mohe but that diverse groups merged to form a Balhae ethnicity. This is directly opposed by Yun Jae-Woon, who points out separate activities by Mohe and Jurchen groups after the fall of Balhae, which demonstrate that they had not been absorbed into Balhae. However, Jesse D. Sloane notes that this does not mean a new ethnicity did not form as well, while not everyone was absorbed into it.

Russian scholars argue that the ethnic composition of Balhae cannot be determined with great precision because no materials exist that can confirm either the Chinese or Korean claims. Some Russian scholars claim Balhae as part of Manchurian history while others believe Balhae was neither a Korean state nor a Chinese province and there is no direct link between Balhae and either modern China or Korea. E. V. Shakunov believes that Balhae's population also consisted of elements from Central Asia such as Sogdians and Tocharians. Many Uyghurs fled to Balhae after the destruction of the Uyghur Khaganate in 840 but they failed to adapt to Balhae society and caused social unrest.

According to Yang Jun, it is evident that Balhae had a diverse population, including other minorities such as Khitan and Evenk peoples. Michael J. Seth also argues that Balhae was multi-cultural, and believes archaeological evidence suggests that the Balhae culture was an amalgamation of High Tang Chinese, Korean, and Tungusic cultures.

Some scholars emphasize the problematic nature of assigning ethnicity to Balhae, the problems with the sources, and how they are interpreted. While Mark E. Byington believes that the Sumo Mohe were the "most likely builders of the Parhae state", he also finds that there are "fundamental problems involved in any determination of the ethnic identity of the displaced groups who established Parhae". Sakayori Masashi observes that competing characterizations of Balhae often project their "respective countries' contemporary conceptions of ethnic identity". John Duncan points out the "problematic nature of nationalist narratives as applied to the history of Parhae". Alexander Kim states that some scholars view these disputes as the result of modern politics rather than historical reality. Johannes Reckel posits that the questions surrounding Balhae do not have a simple answer due to the number ways various historical sources can be interpreted differently.

==== Population change ====
Besides the territorial aspirations of both Korean nationalists and those of Joseon rulers during the mid-late period of the Joseon dynasty, Korean claims to Balhae also rest on ethnicity as well as East Asian concepts of state succession. When Balhae was destroyed by the Liao dynasty, a great portion of the Balhae royalty and aristocracy fled to Goryeo, including Dae Gwang-hyeon, the last crown prince. They were granted land and the crown prince was given the family name Wang (왕; 王), the royal family name of the Goryeo dynasty, and were included in the royal household by Wang Geon, who was crowned as Taejo of Goryeo. Koreans believe Goryeo thus unified the two successor nations of Goguryeo. Some other members of the Balhae royalty took the surname Tae (태; 太). According to the Goryeosa jeolyo, the Balhae refugees who accompanied the crown prince numbered in the tens of thousands of households. As descendants of Goguryeo, the Balhae people and the Goryeo dynasts were related. Taejo of Goryeo felt a strong familial kinship with Balhae, calling it his "relative country" and "married country", and protected the Balhae refugees. This was in stark contrast to Later Silla, which had endured a hostile relationship with Balhae.

Crossley believes that according to Goryeo records, Balhae refugees only arrived in groups of a few hundred to a few thousand. She suggests that the total number could not be more than 100,000, while millions remained in Liao-controlled territories. According to Crossley, it's also unclear whether they stayed, went back to Balhae, or moved on elsewhere like China or Japan. According to Kim, between the 10th and 11th centuries, 30,000 Balhae families (more than 100,000 people) immigrated to Goryeo, 94,000 (470,000 inhabitants) local families were deported by the Liao, and only 20,000 Balhae families lived in the former territories of Balhae, a significantly smaller figure than those that immigrated to Goryeo. Korean historians generally estimate that approximately 100,000 to 200,000 fled from Balhae to Goryeo. Historian Professor Park Jong-gi estimated that 120,600 people fled from Balhae to Goryeo, and by themselves, comprised approximately 6.3% of early Goryeo's roughly 2 million inhabitants.

Exodus en masse on part from the Balhae refugees would continue on at least until the early 12th century, during the reign of King Yejong, according to Korean scholars. (Note: For example, 3,000 Balhae households came to Goryeo in 938.) Due to this constant massive influx of Balhae refugees, the Goguryeo population is speculated to have become dominant in proportion compared to their Silla and Baekje counterparts that have experienced devastating war and political strife since the advent of the Later Three Kingdoms. Later, Baekje fared only little better than Later Silla before its fall in 936. Meanwhile, of the three capitals of Goryeo, two were Kaesong and Pyongyang, which were initially populated by Goguryeoic settlers from the Paeseo Region (패서; 浿西) and Balhae.

=== Textual sources ===
The problem about Parhae history is that many questions are beyond a simple answer. Different, nearly contemporary, sources represent fundamental questions in very different ways with different possible interpretations.

— Johannes Reckel

==== Chinese ====
While the study of Balhae draws on a wide range of textual sources, most investigations of its ethnicity start from the two official histories of the Tang dynasty. Efforts have been made to seek evidence in other texts but works by Balhae authors are extremely scarce.

According to the Old Book of Tang, the founder of Balhae, Da Zuorong or Dae Joyeong, was a Mohe but links him with Goguryeo via the term biezhong (gaoli biezhong; 高麗別種). Literally speaking, biezhong means "separate kind." The phrase gaoli biezhong has been interpreted in different ways. Korean historians believe it means "a branch of the Goguryeo people" while Japanese and Chinese researchers believe it means "distinct from Goguryeo". Richard D. Mcbride II also translates it as "branch of Koguryŏ people". The mainstream Korean position, as represented by Yun Jae-woon, is that the term biezhong "implies that 'branch' is closely related to the main group". Seo Gil-soo argues that the meaning of biezhong as well as other terms such as bielei and zhong in the New and Old Books are used to clarify the origin of things, such as Goguryeo and Buyeo or the Kumo Xi and the Xiongnu. Lei Yijie and Yao Yucheng argue that biezhong does not indicate ethnicity at all and was used in Chinese official sources in situations where different groups with similar culture occupied the same area. Kaizaburo Hino suggests that Da Zuorong or Dae Joyeong was a member of the Mohe that were incorporated into the Goguryeo populace, as the need to explicitly mention gaoli biezhong would have otherwise been unnecessary. Similarly, McBride states that Dae was most likely an "ethnic Malgal/Mohe fully assimilated to Goguryeo culture, and thus able to rally support from both the remaining Goguryeo nobles and Malgal tribespeople".

The Bohai Mohe Da Zuorong was originally a branch of the race of Koguryŏ. Once Koguryŏ had been annihilated [by the Tang], Da Zuorong led his relatives to a new home at Yingzhou 營州 [near modern Chaoyang Municipality 朝陽市, Liaoning]. In the [Tang] Wansui Tongtian 萬歲通天 period [696–697], the Khitan Li Jinzhong 李盡忠 rebelled, and Zuorong and the Mohe Qisi Biyu 乞四比羽 each led a group of refugees fleeing east, fortifying an inaccessible position for self-protection. Once Li Jinzhong had died, [Empress Wu] Zetian 武則天 ordered Li Kaigu 李楷固 [d.u.], Great General of the Right Guards of the Jade Strategy, to lead troops in an attack on [Li Jinzhong's] remaining followers. He first defeated and executed Qisi Biyu, and then crossed the Tianmen Range 天門嶺 to press in on Da Zuorong. Zuorong united Koguryŏ and Mohe groups to repel Li Kaigu. The [Tang] army suffered a major defeat, and Li Kaigu escaped to return [to Tang territory]. All of the Khitan and Xi submitted to the Turks, and with the route [to Zuorong's position] cut off, Wu Zutian was able to attack. Da Zuorong thereupon led his group to the east, fortifying the former territory of the Guilou 桂婁 and buttressed by Mt. Dongmou 東牟山, where they built a wall for a settlement.

— Old Book of Tang, 10th c.

According to Han Ciu-cheol, the Old Book states that the customs of the Balhae, such as coming of age ceremonies, marriages, funerals, and memorial rites, were the same as with the Goguryeo, which Korean historians often cite to support their arguments. However the original quotation in the Old Book does not make any specific mention of the social customs that were similar, and compares Balhae not just to Goguryeo but also to the Khitans: "The customs and habits were the same as in Goryeo and Khitan. It had its script, books and documents." In addition, the Old Book states that after 699, the dispersed people of Goguryeo joined the Turks and Mohe people, ending the Goguryeo royal line. According to Kim Eun Gug, the Old Book indicates that the Tang court bestowed Mu of Balhae the title of "King of Kyeru Commandery," which is significant because Kyeru (Gyeru) was the name that was used to denote old Goguryeo territory. Kim Eun Gug believe this indicates that the Tang recognized Balhae as Goguryeo's successor. (Note: The correct translation is probably "Prince of Kyeru" rather than "King". The title was given to Balhae princes rather than kings, who were always given the title of "Prince of Bohai Commandery" or "King of Bohai". Other titles for the ruler of Balhae include "Commander-in-chief of Huhan".)

The Old Book records that in 690, the Sumo Mohe were called the "Fuyu Mohe". Fuyu (浮渝) is a variant transcription of Buyeo (扶餘). Mark E. Byington believes that the Mohe who settled in Buyeo territory came to be known as the Sumo, and are to some degree the cultural composite of the Mohe people and Buyeo survivors.

The New Book of Tang, compiled in the 11th century, refers to Dae Joyeong and his state as Sumo Mohe, affiliated with Goguryeo. The New Book states that "Parhae was originally the Mohe [tribes] who had submitted to Koguryŏ; the clan surname [of its rulers] was Da." Chinese scholars have argued that Balhae's founder was a member of the Sumo Mohe and Balhae's royalty were Mohe rather than Goguryeo, based on this account. Li Jiancai believes that if the New Book had meant to say that Dae was a Goguryeo person, it would have said so more directly, and therefore the term biezhong in the Old Book implies difference. Yun Jae-woon challenged this by arguing that though he may have been Mohe, they "would have already undergone a substantial process of Koguryŏ-ization" while providing military service to Goguryeo over two generations. Seo argues that the New Book is unreliable because it was written a hundred years after the Old Book and more Sinocentric due to the influence of the Song dynasty. Han notes that Chinese historians often cite the New Book in their arguments, whereas Korean historians often cite the Old Book due to their conflicting viewpoints on the ethnicity of Balhae's founder as well as the nature of Balhae's society.

According to Sloane, Tang sources divided Balhae's population into two categories, Goguryeo and Mohe. The royalty and upper class were composed of Goguryeo remnants while the majority of Balhae's population were Mohe. According to Byington, Chinese communications tended to refer to the state as either Balhae or Mohe with the exception of the Wujing Zongyao, which describes Balhae as an offshoot of Buyeo.

==== Korean ====
According to Ch'oe Ch'i-wŏn (b. 857), who was from Silla, the people of Balhae were Mohe. In the conflict between the joint Tang-Silla forces against Balhae, Silla described Balhae as "rebellious barbarians." Sillan aristocracy tended to view the Balhae population as consisting of solely Mohe people, but this could be due to the antagonistic relations between the two states causing the Sillan nobility to ignore Goguryeo elements of Balhae ethnic composition.

As we know in relation to the origin of the Bohai people, when Gouli (Koguryŏ) was not yet destroyed, they [the Bohai people] were the useless tribe of Mohe. Many tribes were the same; its name was that of the small barbarian nation Sumo, and in the past [this tribe], being in competition with Gouli, moved to the inner region [China].

— Ch'oe Ch'i-wŏn (b. 857)

The Samguk sagi, written in the 12th century by Kim Pusik, did not consider Balhae a Korean state. According to Seo Gil-soo, the Samguk Sagi contains an excerpt of a letter from the Tang Grand Preceptor describing remnants of Goguryeo forming a country which they named Balhae.

The Samguk yusa, a 13th-century collection of Korean history and legends, describes Dae as a Sumo Mohe leader. However, it gives another account of Dae being a former Goguryeo general, citing a now-lost Sillan record. Alexander Kim considers this unlikely since Goguryeo fell in 668 while Dae died in 719, and young men could not receive the rank of general.

The Tongmunson (Selections of Refined Literature of Korea) compiled in 1478 by So Kojong contains an excerpt from a letter sent by Ch'oe Ch'iwŏn to a Tang official stating that "In the past, Emperor Gaozong of Tang destroyed Goguryeo, but that Goguryeo is now Balhae". According to Stella Xu, Ch'oe recognized that Balhae was established by descendants of Goguryeo people but his antipathy towards Balhae resulted in his denial of their place in Korean history.

==== Japanese ====
The Ruijū Kokushi, a 9th-century Japanese text, says that when Balhae was founded, it spanned 2,000 li and was filled with villages, each of which were Mohe tribes.

In length and breadth it measures two thousand li. It has no prefectures, counties, state lodges, or post stations, but has villages everywhere. All are Mohe tribes. Among its subjects, Mohe are many while natives are few. In all cases, natives are made village headmen; in large villages, they are called Commanders-in-Chief, in smaller [villages], Prefects, and below that, all subjects are called Chieftains.

— Ruijū Kokushi, 9th c.

According to Pak Se-yong, the "natives" in the passage refer to people of Goguryeo, and therefore, all officials in the local and central government were Koguryŏ aristocrats. This has been challenged by Han Ciu-cheol, who argues that the term for "native" (J. dojin 土人) should be read as "literati" (J. shijin 士人) instead. The resulting translation would therefore be: "Everywhere there were villages and those villages were all Malgal settlements. There are many Malgal among the commoners but there are few literati." Han notes that in some editions of the Ruijū Kokushi, dojin was replaced with shijin instead. However, Han's position is opposed by Fu Langyun, who argues that dojin does not refer to either Mohe or Goguryeo people but rather, a separate group of native inhabitants, while Yang Jun argues that dojin refers to the Sumo Mohe, who were the natives and referred to themselves as such.

Japanese diplomatic communications with Balhae recognized it as a "state of Go[gu]ryeo." In a diplomatic mission to Japan in 727 or 728, the Balhae envoy said that Balhae has "recovered the lost land of Goguryeo and inherited the old traditions of Buyeo." Wooden tablets discovered in Nara Prefecture state that an envoy to Balhae in 758 was called a Goryeo envoy. Mun of Balhae referred to himself as "King of Goryeo" but Reisa Shimoda suggests that this was not to restore the old name, as noted in the Dai Nihonshi, but as a means of gaining Japan's favor by invoking Goryeo. Examples of Balhae envoys being referred to as Goryeo envoys and Balhae kings as the king of Goryeo are found extensively in the Nara Period but have not been found during the later Heian Period. According to Japanese historian Shiratori Kurakichi, 26 of the 85 emissaries dispatched to Japan by Balhae bore the typical Goguryeo surname of Ko (Go), which is still commonly used in Korea, which indicated a substantial Goguryeo presence in Balhae culture. Some Korean historians believe that a record in the Shoku Nihongi implies that the Balhae and Silla language were mutually intelligible: a student sent from Silla to Japan for Japanese language interpreter training assisted a diplomatic envoy from Balhae in communicating with the audience of a Japanese court.

=== Archaeology ===
==== Burials ====
Chinese scholars have argued that the use of single-chambered brick tombs shows Tang influence. These single-chamber brick tombs appear later in Balhae history and appear less frequently. It was probably not due to a lack of other material that brick was used as stone was widely used around the capital sites. In the early 1980s, Nishikawa Hiroshi argued that early Balhae tombs resembled the Mohe practice of joint burial and reburial. Earthen pit tombs have also been interpreted as Mohe practice by Japanese and Chinese scholarship. Yun Jae-Woon argues that vertical-slit pits were used by non-elites universally and that earth tombs were more common in early Balhae, but many features found in Balhae tombs are influenced by Goguryeo, such as above ground structures, roof tiles, and the use of stone. According to Han Ciu-cheol, Balhae's ruling class used stone lined tombs, stone chambers, and stone coffins which had been used by Goguryeo's ruling class.

Sloane and Dieter Kuhn caution against assigning ethnicity to Balhae using architectural features as proof. Kuhn states that architectural types are not a reliable indicator of identity and points out that the Khitan Liao dynasty's architecture is completely based on Tang and Balhae precedents, with no distinctive "Khitan" elements. Architectural styles can be limited based on the environment, techniques and materials available. Certain structures such as pit dwellings could have been preferred in Balhae as a practical solution to low temperatures and to protect against the wind, rather than because of the occupants' ethnicity. Some Russian scholars believe that no materials exist that can confirm Balhae's exact ethnic makeup.

==== Ceramics ====
Balhae's ceramic vessels in China have been divided into three stylistic types: Mohe, Goguryeo, and Tang. Early Balhae vessels were mainly categorized as of the Mohe type and used as evidence that Balhae was founded by Mohe. Chinese archaeologists argue that the geographic distribution of Balhae's ceramics match that of the "wide-mouthed, deep-bellied jars of coarse black-brown material" from proceeding centuries in the same area. Chinese archaeologists refer to the previous culture as "Tongren Culture" while texts refer to the inhabitants of the area as "Mohe" and "Wuji" (K. Mulgil, J. Mukkitsu). Later, Balhae pottery show technical improvement and the introduction of three-color glazes.

Wei Cuncheng argues that "deep-bellied cylindrical jars and bowls" were prevalent from before the 8th century until the 10th or 11th centuries, especially in small burials and outside the capitals. He argues that these are indicative of the Sumo Mohe tribe and demonstrate that the majority of Balhae's population, particularly during its founding, was culturally, and ethnically Mohe. Yun Jae-Woon argues that similar jars have been found at Goguryeo sites but it is unclear if these are of the same type and could date later than the jars Wei refers to. Yun also argues that the jars do not indicate ethnic difference and "should be seen as reflecting social and cultural differences between elites and non-elites and between the center and the provinces."

==== City planning ====
Lee Byeong Gun argues that the pairing of flat riverside settlements with hilltop redoubts distinguishes Balhae settlements from Tang Chinese urban planning. To Lee, mountain sites represent the indigenous culture of Goguryeo, supporting the continuity and succession from Goguryeo to Balhae. Chinese scholarship does not portray Tang and Balhae styles as identical but rather, emphasizes influences on Balhae. Round eave-end roof tiles show Goguryeo influence while ceramic ornamentation show Tang influence. The patterns of Balhae style eave-end roof tiles have been used in China for reconstruction of a Tang dynasty site in Shanxi. Korean scholars argue that the existence of heated platforms in some building sites in the Balhae capital indicate Balhae succession from Goguryeo. Chinese scholars point to the existence of pit dwellings as examples of Mohe culture. No consensus has been reached yet on the cultural origin of the Lingguang Pagoda located in Changbai County, the only surviving above ground example of Balhae architecture.

== Role of Wikipedia ==
A comparative study on how different Wikipedia projects (English Wikipedia, Chinese Wikipedia, Korean Wikipedia) handled the portrayal of Balhae and the dispute was published in April 2024 by the Asian Journal of Communication. Conducted by Jonghyun Jee, Byungjun Kim, and Bong Gwan Jun, the study found that the English Wikipedia article for Balhae represents a "tug-of-war between different nationalistic ideologies seeking validation on a global platform". Nevertheless, it showcases Wikipedia's potential as a platform where conflicting perspectives can "collectively craft an article... that overcomes deep-seated historical convictions over time". This is not due to its ability to change a user's opinion on the subject matter through talk page discussion, but rather the simpler process of guiding edits toward neutrality based on adherence to Wikipedia policies. Users entered talk discussions, such as the one on the choice of transliteration for the title of the Balhae article, with distinct goals. They employed strategies focused on justifying their preferences and discrediting their opponents rather than finding common ground. Concessions were made by users due to the process of negotiating collective neutrality rather than reaching a result through collaborative knowledge-building.

Of the top 20 editors on the English Wikipedia Balhae article, a large portion also engaged in non-English Wikipedia editing. Some editors showed a disproportionate focus on Balhae relative to their overall contribution on English Wikipedia, suggesting a specialized and strategic interest in the topic. Several editors received indefinite blocks for policy violations such as edit warring and sockpuppetry.

The study describes edits to portray Balhae as definitively Korean or Chinese as strategic actions driven by nationalistic desires to "dominate the overarching story". Vandalism often involves the insertion of labels into the lead section depicting Balhae as a Korean or Chinese kingdom without discussion. Other typical edits include emphasizing the presence of the Mohe people by pro-Chinese users and the role of Goguryeo refugees by pro-Korean users. However, as the NPOV (Neutral Point of View) principle was invoked, binary nationalistic tags gave way to more ambiguous and inclusive descriptors like "multiethnic". This systematic ambiguity based on the NPOV policy served to alleviate conflict, although sporadic attempts to push "Korean" or "Chinese" national labels to the forefront persist. The division of the article into separate pages for Balhae and Balhae controversies represented a turning point in the discourse that acknowledged the existence of multiple valid interpretations of history, and notably a separation between established history and their interpretation.

While the English Wikipedia article for Balhae readily acknowledges potential disputes regarding Balhae, adopting a more encyclopedic tone without imposing a single perspective, the case is less true with the Korean and Chinese Wikipedia projects. At the time the study was conducted, the Korean Wikipedia article for Balhae omitted any mention of the kingdom's multiethnic character in the lead section, instead focusing on a narrative centered around the Balhae founder's role as a general and successor of Goguryeo. The article established a connection between the founder and Goguryeo while making no mention of Balhae's affiliation with any other ethnic group. Balhae was categorized under only the "History of Korea", reflecting the notion that Balhae belongs exclusively to Korean history. The Korean article described various perspectives of historical polities and states with the implication that China's recent revision of Balhae's history carries political undertones that threaten Korea's ancient historical identity.

The Balhae article on Chinese Wikipedia characterized Balhae as a multiethnic kingdom centered on the Mohe people as its primary ethnicity while other groups such as Goguryeo, Sushen, Yilou, Woju, and Wuji were listed as predecessors of Balhae. The lead section described the destruction of the Balhae state and the assimilation of the Balhae people into the ruling Jurchen people of the Jin dynasty, situating Balhae within Manchurian history rather than Korean. However, the article listed Balhae under "Korean Peninsula Dynasties" along with other historical categories, demonstrating that Chinese Wikipedians did consider Balhae to be part of both Korean and Chinese history. This may be explained by the user base of Chinese Wikipedia and the fact that Chinese Wikipedia has been blocked in mainland China since 2015. The contributors to Chinese Wikipedia are mostly from Taiwan, Hong Kong, and the broader Chinese diaspora. This was true even before the ban in 2015. Compared to Chinese Wikipedia, the collaborative encyclopedia Baidu Baike, which follows content regulations in the People's Republic of China, referred to Balhae as "a minority political power in ancient Chinese history", reflecting the view by modern Chinese historians that Balhae's history is an important aspect of Manchuria's past and by extension, "Chinese history" in a broad sense. The Chinese Wikipedia article framed Balhae as a local administration of the Tang dynasty but did not claim that the kingdom belonged exclusively to Chinese history.

The study notes that the editors of the English Wikipedia article are more varied in their backgrounds and the number of edits dwarf the Korean (2x) and Chinese (4x) versions. The disparity can also be observed in English talk discussions, which shows 19 and 20 times the level of activity respectively. This highlights the homogeneity of smaller Wikipedia language editions while the English Wikipedia serves as a nexus of global knowledge composed of diverse users with disparate perspectives. The authors acknowledge the phenomenon of "information imperialism" where Western narratives are privileged due to the Western-centric user base, structural disparities in global knowledge dissemination, and the global prominence of the English language, but also point out that the primary contributors to the Balhae article are Korean, Chinese, or Russian.

== Bibliography ==
- Byington, Mark E. (2016), The Ancient State of Puyŏ in Northeast Asia, Harvard University Asia Center
- Karlsson, Anders (December 2009). Northern Territories and the Historical Understanding of Territory in Late Chosŏn. Working Papers in Korean Studies. School of Oriental and African Studies, University of London.
- Crossley, Pamela K. (2002), The Manchus, Blackwell Publishers
- Crossley, Pamela Kyle (2016), Bohai/Parhae Identity and the Coherence of Dan gur under the Kitan/Liao Empire
- Jee, Jonghyun; Kim, Byungjun; Jun, Bong Gwan (2024), "The role of English Wikipedia in mediating East Asian historical disputes: the case of Balhae", Asian Journal of Communication, Routledge
- Kim, Alexander (2011a), Relations Between Bohai and Silla (7th to 9th Centuries): A Critical Analysis
- Kim, Alexander (2011b), On the Origin of the Jurchen People (A Study Based on Russian Sources)
- Kim, Alexander (2011), The Historiography of Bohai in Russia
- Kim, Alexander (2015), The Problem of the Ethnic Composition of the Bohai State – A Comparative Analysis of Russian and Korean Materials*Shin, Yong-ha (2000), Modern Korean history and nationalism, Korean Studies, Jimoondang
- Kim, Alexander (2019), Relations between the Bohai people and the Koryŏ kingdom
- Kim, Jong-bok (2014a), A Buffer Zone for Peace: Andong Protectorate and Diplomatic Relations between Silla, Balhae, and Tang in the 8th to 10th Centuries, Korea Journal
- Lee, Ji-Young (2017), China's Hegemony: Four Hundred Years of East Asian Domination, Columbia University Press
- McBride, Richard (2024), The Three Kingdoms of Korea: Lost Civilizations
- Rossabi, Morris (1983). China Among Equals: The Middle Kingdom and Its Neighbors, 10th-14th Centuries. University of California Press. ISBN 9780520045620.
- Reckel, Johannes (2015), Review of A New History of Parhae
- Sloane, Jesse D. (2014), Mapping a Stateless Nation: "Bohai" Identity in the Twelfth to Fourteenth Centuries
- Sloane, Jesse D. (2014a), Parhae in Historiography and Archaeology: International Debate and Prospects for Resolution
- Xu, Stella (2016), Reconstructing Ancient Korean History: The Formation of Korean-ness in the Shadow of History, Lexington Books
