= Manchu name =

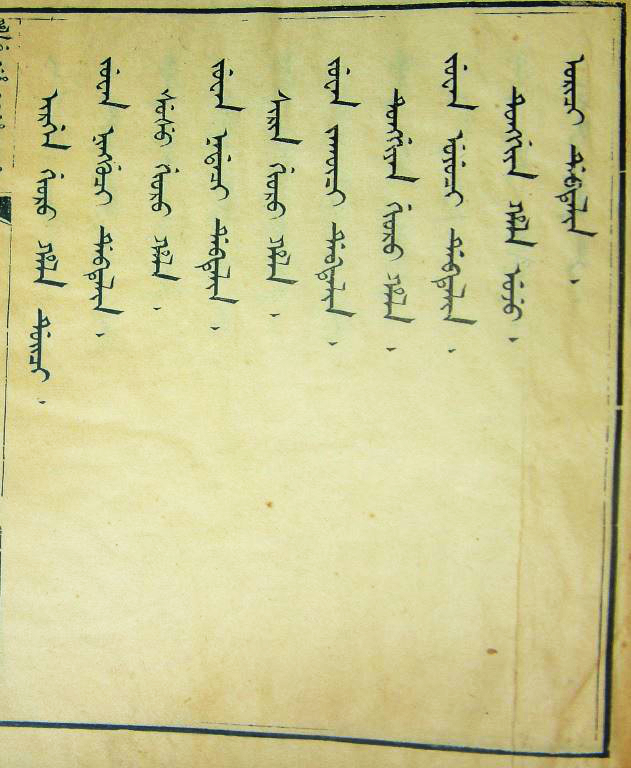
《The Comprehensive Book of the Eight Manchurian Banners' Surname-Clans (八旗满洲氏族通谱, ᠵᠠᡴᡡᠨ ᡤᡡᠰᠠᡳ ᠮᠠᠨᠵᡠᠰᠠᡳ ᠮᡠᡴᡡᠨ ᡥᠠᠯᠠ ᠪᡝ ᡠᡥᡝᡵᡳ ᡝᠵᡝᡥᡝ ᠪᡳᡨᡥᡝJakūn Gūsai Manjusai Mukūn Hala be Uheri Ejehe Bithe) p.33

Manchu names are the names of the Manchu people in their own language. Generally, there are several forms, such as bearing suffixes "-ngga", "-ngge" or "-nggo", meaning "having the quality of"; bearing the suffixes "-tai" or "-tu", meaning "having"; bearing the suffix, "-ju", "-boo"; numerals (Note: e.g. Nadanju (70 in Manchu), Susai (5 in Manchu), Liošici (67, a Mandarin homophone) and Bašinu (85, a Mandarin homophone)) or animal names. (Note: e.g. Dorgon (badger) and Arsalan (lion))

The Jurchens and their Manchu descendants had Khitan linguistic and grammatical elements in their personal names like suffixes. Many Khitan names had a "-ju" suffix.

Nikan (Han Chinese) was a common first name for Manchus. Nikan Wailan was a Jurchen leader who was an enemy of Nurhaci. Nikan was the name of one of the Aisin Gioro princes and grandsons of Nurhaci who supported Prince Dorgon. Nurhaci's first son was Cuyen, one of whose sons was Nikan.

== See also ==
- List of Manchu clans
- Chinese name
- Khitan name
