= Para-Mongolic languages =

Proposed group of extinct languages

Para-Mongolic
- Serbi–Awar (Xianbei–Wuhuan); Khitanic
- Geographic distribution: Mongolia, northern China, Lake Baikal region
- Linguistic classification: Serbi–Mongolic: Para-Mongolic
- Subdivisions: Khitan; Tuyuhun; Tuoba?; Rouran?; Pannonian Avar?

Language codes
- Glottolog: None kita1247 Kitan (Note: Only member of this branch represented)

Para-Mongolic is a group of languages that is considered to be an extinct sister branch of the Mongolic languages. Para-Mongolic contains certain historically attested extinct languages, among them Khitan and Tuyuhun.

== Languages ==
A timeline-based graphical representation of the Mongolic and Para-Mongolic languages

The languages of the Xiongnu, Donghu and Wuhuan might be Para-Mongolic, as might those of the Xianbei and the Tuoba (the founders of the Northern Wei) and Khitan. Because the surviving evidence for Xianbei and Tuoba is very sparse, one can only hypothesize that a genetic relationship could be possible. In the case of Khitan, there is rich evidence, but most of it is written in the two Khitan scripts (large and small) that have yet to be fully deciphered. However, from the available evidence it has been concluded that a genetic relationship to Mongolic is likely.

=== Tuoba ===
Alexander Vovin (2007) identifies the extinct Tuoba language (Tabɣač) as a Mongolic language. However, Chen (2005) argues that Tuoba was a Turkic language.

Shimunek classifies Tuoba as a "Serbi" (i.e., para-Mongolic) language, along with Tuyuhun and Khitan.

=== Rouran ===
Alexander Vovin (2018) suggests that the Rouran language of the Rouran Khaganate was a Mongolic language, close but not identical to Middle Mongolian.

==== Pannonian Avar ====
Shimunek (2017) proposes that the elite core of the Avars spoke a "Para-Mongolic language" of the "Serbi–Awar" group, that is a sister branch of the Mongolic languages. Together, the Serbi–Awar and Mongolic languages make up the Serbi–Mongolic languages.

=== Khitan ===
Juha Janhunen (2006) classified the Khitan language into the "Para-Mongolic" family, meaning that it is related to the Mongolic languages as a sister group, rather than as a direct descendant of Proto-Mongolic. Alexander Vovin (2017) has also identified several possible loanwords from Koreanic languages into the Khitan language.

=== Tuyuhun ===
Vovin (2015) identified the extinct Tuyuhun language as a Para-Mongolic language.

== Internal classification ==
Shimunek (2017) proposes a "Serbi–Awar" group of languages that is a sister branch of the Mongolic languages. Together, the Serbi–Awar and Mongolic languages make up the Serbi–Mongolic languages in Shimunek's classification.

- Serbi–Mongolic
  - Mongolic
  - Serbi–Awar (= Juha Janhunen's "Para-Mongolic")
    - Awar (Avar) (Wuhuan 烏桓 or Wuwan 烏丸)
    - Old Serbi (Common Serbi)
      - Ch’i-fu/Qifu 乞伏 (northern Early Middle Chinese/NEMC *kʰɨrbuwk)
      - Tuan/Duan 段 (NEMC *dɔr̃)
      - Taghbach
      - Tuyuhun/T’u-yü-hun (Mu-jung/Murong 慕容)
      - Kitanic (Yü-wen/Yuwen 宇文)
        - Old Kitan
        - Qay 奚 (NEMC *ɣay)
        - Shirwi proper 室韋 (*širwi/*širβi < *serbi 鮮卑 'Xianbei')

== See also ==
- Xianbei
- Donghu people

== Bibliography ==
- Andrews, Peter A. (1999). Felt tents and pavilions: the nomadic tradition and its interaction with princely tentage. Vol. 1. Melisende. ISBN 1-901764-03-6.
- Janhunen, Juha (2003a). "Proto-Mongolic". In Janhunen, J. (ed.). The Mongolic languages. Routledge. ISBN 9780700711338.
- Janhunen, Juha (2003b). "Para-Mongolic". In Janhunen, J. (ed.). The Mongolic languages. Routledge. pp. 391–402. ISBN 9780700711338.
