= Khitan Small Script (Unicode block) =

- Range: U+18B00..U+18CFF (512 code points)
- Plane: SMP
- Scripts: Khitan small script
- Assigned: 476 code points
- Unused: 36 reserved code points

Unicode Version History
- 13.0 (2020): 470 (+470)
- 16.0 (2024): 471 (+1)
- 18.0 (2026): 476 (+5)

Unicode documentation
- Code chart ∣ Web page

Khitan Small Script is a Unicode block containing characters from the Khitan small script, which was used for writing the Khitan language spoken by the Khitan people in northern China during the Liao dynasty.

Khitan Small Script characters do not have descriptive character names, but have names derived algorithmically from their code point value (e.g. U+18B00 is named KHITAN SMALL SCRIPT CHARACTER-18B00).

== Block ==
Khitan Small Script^{[1]}^{[2]} Official Unicode Consortium code chart (PDF)
	0	1	2	3	4	5	6	7	8	9	A	B	C	D	E	F
U+18B0x	𘬀	𘬁	𘬂	𘬃	𘬄	𘬅	𘬆	𘬇	𘬈	𘬉	𘬊	𘬋	𘬌	𘬍	𘬎	𘬏
U+18B1x	𘬐	𘬑	𘬒	𘬓	𘬔	𘬕	𘬖	𘬗	𘬘	𘬙	𘬚	𘬛	𘬜	𘬝	𘬞	𘬟
U+18B2x	𘬠	𘬡	𘬢	𘬣	𘬤	𘬥	𘬦	𘬧	𘬨	𘬩	𘬪	𘬫	𘬬	𘬭	𘬮	𘬯
U+18B3x	𘬰	𘬱	𘬲	𘬳	𘬴	𘬵	𘬶	𘬷	𘬸	𘬹	𘬺	𘬻	𘬼	𘬽	𘬾	𘬿
U+18B4x	𘭀	𘭁	𘭂	𘭃	𘭄	𘭅	𘭆	𘭇	𘭈	𘭉	𘭊	𘭋	𘭌	𘭍	𘭎	𘭏
U+18B5x	𘭐	𘭑	𘭒	𘭓	𘭔	𘭕	𘭖	𘭗	𘭘	𘭙	𘭚	𘭛	𘭜	𘭝	𘭞	𘭟
U+18B6x	𘭠	𘭡	𘭢	𘭣	𘭤	𘭥	𘭦	𘭧	𘭨	𘭩	𘭪	𘭫	𘭬	𘭭	𘭮	𘭯
U+18B7x	𘭰	𘭱	𘭲	𘭳	𘭴	𘭵	𘭶	𘭷	𘭸	𘭹	𘭺	𘭻	𘭼	𘭽	𘭾	𘭿
U+18B8x	𘮀	𘮁	𘮂	𘮃	𘮄	𘮅	𘮆	𘮇	𘮈	𘮉	𘮊	𘮋	𘮌	𘮍	𘮎	𘮏
U+18B9x	𘮐	𘮑	𘮒	𘮓	𘮔	𘮕	𘮖	𘮗	𘮘	𘮙	𘮚	𘮛	𘮜	𘮝	𘮞	𘮟
U+18BAx	𘮠	𘮡	𘮢	𘮣	𘮤	𘮥	𘮦	𘮧	𘮨	𘮩	𘮪	𘮫	𘮬	𘮭	𘮮	𘮯
U+18BBx	𘮰	𘮱	𘮲	𘮳	𘮴	𘮵	𘮶	𘮷	𘮸	𘮹	𘮺	𘮻	𘮼	𘮽	𘮾	𘮿
U+18BCx	𘯀	𘯁	𘯂	𘯃	𘯄	𘯅	𘯆	𘯇	𘯈	𘯉	𘯊	𘯋	𘯌	𘯍	𘯎	𘯏
U+18BDx	𘯐	𘯑	𘯒	𘯓	𘯔	𘯕	𘯖	𘯗	𘯘	𘯙	𘯚	𘯛	𘯜	𘯝	𘯞	𘯟
U+18BEx	𘯠	𘯡	𘯢	𘯣	𘯤	𘯥	𘯦	𘯧	𘯨	𘯩	𘯪	𘯫	𘯬	𘯭	𘯮	𘯯
U+18BFx	𘯰	𘯱	𘯲	𘯳	𘯴	𘯵	𘯶	𘯷	𘯸	𘯹	𘯺	𘯻	𘯼	𘯽	𘯾	𘯿
U+18C0x	𘰀	𘰁	𘰂	𘰃	𘰄	𘰅	𘰆	𘰇	𘰈	𘰉	𘰊	𘰋	𘰌	𘰍	𘰎	𘰏
U+18C1x	𘰐	𘰑	𘰒	𘰓	𘰔	𘰕	𘰖	𘰗	𘰘	𘰙	𘰚	𘰛	𘰜	𘰝	𘰞	𘰟
U+18C2x	𘰠	𘰡	𘰢	𘰣	𘰤	𘰥	𘰦	𘰧	𘰨	𘰩	𘰪	𘰫	𘰬	𘰭	𘰮	𘰯
U+18C3x	𘰰	𘰱	𘰲	𘰳	𘰴	𘰵	𘰶	𘰷	𘰸	𘰹	𘰺	𘰻	𘰼	𘰽	𘰾	𘰿
U+18C4x	𘱀	𘱁	𘱂	𘱃	𘱄	𘱅	𘱆	𘱇	𘱈	𘱉	𘱊	𘱋	𘱌	𘱍	𘱎	𘱏
U+18C5x	𘱐	𘱑	𘱒	𘱓	𘱔	𘱕	𘱖	𘱗	𘱘	𘱙	𘱚	𘱛	𘱜	𘱝	𘱞	𘱟
U+18C6x	𘱠	𘱡	𘱢	𘱣	𘱤	𘱥	𘱦	𘱧	𘱨	𘱩	𘱪	𘱫	𘱬	𘱭	𘱮	𘱯
U+18C7x	𘱰	𘱱	𘱲	𘱳	𘱴	𘱵	𘱶	𘱷	𘱸	𘱹	𘱺	𘱻	𘱼	𘱽	𘱾	𘱿
U+18C8x	𘲀	𘲁	𘲂	𘲃	𘲄	𘲅	𘲆	𘲇	𘲈	𘲉	𘲊	𘲋	𘲌	𘲍	𘲎	𘲏
U+18C9x	𘲐	𘲑	𘲒	𘲓	𘲔	𘲕	𘲖	𘲗	𘲘	𘲙	𘲚	𘲛	𘲜	𘲝	𘲞	𘲟
U+18CAx	𘲠	𘲡	𘲢	𘲣	𘲤	𘲥	𘲦	𘲧	𘲨	𘲩	𘲪	𘲫	𘲬	𘲭	𘲮	𘲯
U+18CBx	𘲰	𘲱	𘲲	𘲳	𘲴	𘲵	𘲶	𘲷	𘲸	𘲹	𘲺	𘲻	𘲼	𘲽	𘲾	𘲿
U+18CCx	𘳀	𘳁	𘳂	𘳃	𘳄	𘳅	𘳆	𘳇	𘳈	𘳉	𘳊	𘳋	𘳌	𘳍	𘳎	𘳏
U+18CDx	𘳐	𘳑	𘳒	𘳓	𘳔	𘳕	𘳖	𘳗	𘳘	𘳙	𘳚					
U+18CEx																
U+18CFx																𘳿
Notes 1.As of Unicode version 18.0 2.Grey areas indicate non-assigned code points

== History ==
The following Unicode-related documents record the purpose and process of defining specific characters in the Khitan Small Script block:

Version	Final code points (Note: Proposed code points and characters names may differ from final code points and names)	Count	L2 ID	WG2 ID	Document
13.0	U+18B00..18CD5	470	L2/10-130	N3820	Sun, Bojun; Jing, Yongshi; Li, Yang (2010-04-05), Preliminary Proposal for Encoding Khitan Characters in UCS
13.0	U+18B00..18CD5	470	L2/10-369	N3918	Sun, Bojun; Jing, Yongshi; Li, Yang (2010-09-16), Proposal of Encode the Khitan Characters to UCS plane
13.0	U+18B00..18CD5	470	L2/10-400	N3942	Anderson, Deborah (2010-10-06), Ad hoc report on Khitan Small Script
13.0	U+18B00..18CD5	470		N3903 (pdf, doc)	"M57.27", Unconfirmed minutes of WG2 meeting 57, 2011-03-31
13.0	U+18B00..18CD5	470	L2/16-113R	N4725R	West, Andrew; Zaytsev, Viacheslav; Everson, Michael (2016-05-21), Towards an Encoding of the Khitan Small Script
13.0	U+18B00..18CD5	470	L2/16-156		Anderson, Deborah; Whistler, Ken; Pournader, Roozbeh; Glass, Andrew; Iancu, Laurențiu (2016-05-06), "9. Khitan", Recommendations to UTC #147 May 2016 on Script Proposals
13.0	U+18B00..18CD5	470	L2/16-243	N4736	Anderson, Deborah (2016-09-06), "For Khitan Small Script", Summary of Meeting on Khitan Scripts, 20 August 2016 (Yinchuan, China) - Ad Hoc Report #1
13.0	U+18B00..18CD5	470	L2/16-244	N4737	Anderson, Deborah (2016-09-06), Summary of Meeting on Khitan Scripts, 22 August 2016 (Yinchuan, China) - Ad Hoc Report #2
13.0	U+18B00..18CD5	470	L2/16-245R2	N4738R2	Wu, Yingzhe; Sun, Bojun; Jing, Yongshi; Zaytsev, Viacheslav; West, Andrew; Everson, Michael (2016-09-17), Final proposal to encode the Small Khitan Script in the SMP
13.0	U+18B00..18CD5	470	L2/16-266	N4763	Anderson, Deborah; Whistler, Ken; McGowan, Rick; Pournader, Roozbeh; Glass, Andrew; Iancu, Laurențiu; Moore, Lisa (2016-09-26), "2. Khitan Small Script", Comments on Mongolian, Small Khitan, and other WG2 #65 documents
13.0	U+18B00..18CD5	470	L2/16-271	N4771	Everson, Michael (2016-09-29), Khitan Small Script code chart based on the ad-hoc in San Jose
13.0	U+18B00..18CD5	470		N4873R (pdf, doc)	"10.2.5", Unconfirmed minutes of WG 2 meeting 65, 2018-03-16
13.0	U+18B00..18CD5	470	L2/16-277	N4765	Zaytsev, Viacheslav; West, Andrew (2016-10-12), Discussion of 29 proposed Khitan Small Script characters
13.0	U+18B00..18CD5	470	L2/16-296	N4775	West, Andrew; Everson, Michael; Zaytsev, Viacheslav (2016-11-04), Discussion of Cluster Formation in Khitan Small Script
13.0	U+18B00..18CD5	470	L2/16-338	N4768	Moore, Lisa (2016-11-04), Summary of Ad Hoc Meeting on Khitan Small Script, 28 September 2016
13.0	U+18B00..18CD5	470	L2/16-342		Anderson, Deborah; Whistler, Ken; Pournader, Roozbeh; Glass, Andrew; Iancu, Laurențiu (2016-11-07), "10", Recommendations to UTC #149 November 2016 on Script Proposals
13.0	U+18B00..18CD5	470	L2/16-376		Listener, Snow (2016-11-17), Layman's comments on the encoding proposal Khitan small script
13.0	U+18B00..18CD5	470	L2/17-037		Anderson, Deborah; Whistler, Ken; Pournader, Roozbeh; Glass, Andrew; Iancu, Laurențiu; Moore, Lisa; Liang, Hai; Ishida, Richard; Misra, Karan; McGowan, Rick (2017-01-21), "15", Recommendations to UTC #150 January 2017 on Script Proposals
13.0	U+18B00..18CD5	470	L2/17-016		Moore, Lisa (2017-02-08), "Consensus 150-C20", UTC #150 Minutes
13.0	U+18B00..18CD5	470	L2/17-161	N4794	Suignard, Michel (2017-05-08), "China T2, Ireland T1, UK T5", Draft disposition of comments on PDAM1.2 to ISO/IEC 10646 5th edition
13.0	U+18B00..18CD5	470		N4953 (pdf, doc)	"M66.03b, c, and f, M66.07l", Unconfirmed minutes of WG 2 meeting 66, 2018-03-23
13.0	U+18B00..18CD5	470	L2/18-121R	N4943R	West, Andrew; Zaytsev, Viacheslav; Everson, Michael (2018-05-19), Cluster Formation Model for Khitan Small Script
13.0	U+18B00..18CD5	470	L2/18-168		Anderson, Deborah; Whistler, Ken; Pournader, Roozbeh; Moore, Lisa; Liang, Hai; Chapman, Chris; Cook, Richard (2018-04-28), "14. Khitan Small Script", Recommendations to UTC #155 April-May 2018 on Script Proposals
13.0	U+18B00..18CD5	470	L2/18-115		Moore, Lisa (2018-05-09), "C.12", UTC #155 Minutes
13.0	U+18B00..18CD5	470	L2/18-210	N4977	Anderson, Deborah; Whistler, Ken; Pournader, Roozbeh; Glass, Andrew; Constable, Peter; Moore, Lisa; Jeziorek, Marek; Yang, Ben (2018-06-09), "1", Comments on WG2 #67 documents (June 2018)
13.0	U+18B00..18CD5	470	L2/18-213	N5002	Anderson, Deborah; Constable, Peter (2018-06-20), Khitan Small Script Ad Hoc Report (London)
13.0	U+18B00..18CD5	470	L2/18-241		Anderson, Deborah; et al. (2018-07-20), "9", Recommendations to UTC # 156 July 2018 on Script Proposals
13.0	U+18B00..18CD5	470	L2/18-285		Anderson, Deborah (2018-08-31), Further information on Khitan Small Script clusters
13.0	U+18B00..18CD5	470	L2/18-300		Anderson, Deborah; et al. (2018-09-14), "9. a.", Recommendations to UTC #157 on Script Proposals
13.0	U+18B00..18CD5	470	L2/18-183		Moore, Lisa (2018-11-20), "C.12 Cluster Formation Model for Khitan Small Script", UTC #156 Minutes
13.0	U+18B00..18CD5	470		N5020 (pdf, doc)	Umamaheswaran, V. S. (2019-01-11), "9.2.3", Unconfirmed minutes of WG 2 meeting 67
13.0	U+18B00..18CD5	470	L2/20-015R		Moore, Lisa (2020-05-14), "Consensus 162-C16", Draft Minutes of UTC Meeting 162
13.0	U+18B00..18CD5	470	L2/21-182		Chan, Eiso; You, Jerry; Yu, Fitzgerald; Wong, Victor (2021-08-16), Request to modify U+18CCA glyph in Khitan Small Script block
13.0	U+18B00..18CD5	470	L2/21-174		Anderson, Deborah; Whistler, Ken; Pournader, Roozbeh; Liang, Hai (2021-10-01), "14. Khitan Small Script", Recommendations to UTC #169 October 2021 on Script Proposals
13.0	U+18B00..18CD5	470	L2/21-167		Cummings, Craig (2022-01-27), "Consensus 169-C18", Approved Minutes of UTC Meeting 169, "Accept a glyph change for U+18CCA"
13.0	U+18B00..18CD5	470	L2/23-199		West, Andrew (2023-07-29), Glyph correction for Khitan Small Script U+18BD2
13.0	U+18B00..18CD5	470	L2/23-238R		Anderson, Deborah; Kučera, Jan; Whistler, Ken; Pournader, Roozbeh; Constable, Peter (2023-11-01), "6 Khitan Small Script", Recommendations to UTC #177 November 2023 on Script Proposals
13.0	U+18B00..18CD5	470	L2/23-231		Constable, Peter (2023-12-08), "Consensus 177-C29", UTC #177 Minutes, "Accept the glyph change for U+18BD2"
16.0	U+18CFF	1	L2/23-065	N5205	West, Andrew (2023-03-01), Proposal to encode a blank character for Khitan Small Script
16.0	U+18CFF	1	L2/23-083		Anderson, Deborah; Kučera, Jan; Whistler, Ken; Pournader, Roozbeh; Constable, Peter (2023-04-21), "3 Khitan Small Script", Recommendations to UTC #175 April 2023 on Script Proposals
16.0	U+18CFF	1	L2/23-076		Constable, Peter (2023-05-01), "Consensus 175-C15", UTC #175 Minutes, "Provisionally assign U+18CFF KHITAN SMALL SCRIPT CHARACTER-18CFF"
16.0	U+18CFF	1	L2/23-231		Constable, Peter (2023-12-08), "Consensus 177-C30", UTC #177 Minutes, "Accept the provisionally assigned character U+18CFF"
18.0	U+18CD6..18CDA	5	L2/25-152	N5309	Zaytsev, Viacheslav; West, Andrew (2025-05-22), Proposal to encode Jurchen Small Script characters
18.0	U+18CD6..18CDA	5	L2/25-164	N5321	Zaytsev, Viacheslav; West, Andrew (2025-06-10), Technical update on Proposal to encode Jurchen Small Script characters
18.0	U+18CD6..18CDA	5	L2/25-187		Kučera, Jan; Anderson, Deborah; Pournader, Roozbeh; Constable, Peter; Goregaokar, Manish; Leroy, Robin (2025-07-18), "1.2 Jurchen Small Script characters", Recommendations to UTC #184 (July 2025) on Script Proposals
18.0	U+18CD6..18CDA	5	L2/25-181		Leroy, Robin (2025-08-07), "D.1 Section 1.2 Jurchen Small Script characters", UTC #184 Minutes
18.0	U+18CD6..18CDA	5	L2/25-226		"Consensus 185-C39", UTC #185 Minutes, 2025-10-29, "UTC accepts for encoding in Unicode 18.0 ..."

== See also ==
- Ideographic Symbols and Punctuation (Unicode block)
