= Yelü Diela =

Inventor of the Khitan small script (c.925)

Yelü Diela (Chinese: 耶律迭剌) was the younger brother of the Liao dynasty founder Yelü Abaoji. He invented the "Khitan small script" to accommodate the more agglutinative Khitan language around the year 925. The script was based partly on the earlier "Khitan large script" or Chinese-like logographic writing, but was also inspired by the vertically written Old Uyghur alphabet that was shown to him by an ambassador.
