= Han Qixian =

Jin dynasty politician

- Chinese: 韓企先
Transcriptions
Standard Mandarin
- Hanyu Pinyin: Hán Qǐxīan

Han Qixian was a Jin dynasty statesman and reformer. He was one of the key political figures during the reign of Emperor Xizong of Jin.

Han was originally a citizen of Liao dynasty from Yanjing(later known as Beijing). He was qualified as a Jinshi around the year of 1105 during the rule of Emperor Tianzuo of Liao. His family served Liao for generations. He himself was a descendant of Han Zhigu who was one of the founding members of Liao.

The first Jurchen conquest(12 century) ended the Liao dynasty. Han was then relocated to the Bureau of Military Affairs and began to serve the new ruler of Northern China. In 1128, he substituted the recently deceased Liu Zongyan as the director of Bureau of Military Affairs. In 1129, Han was appointed the left deputy director of the Department of State Affairs(尚書左僕射). However, as a native Chinese, he was not able to fully govern as a director due to the aboriginal Jurchen conventions.

In 1134, Han was summoned to Shangjing and the court of Emperor Taizong of Jin. Emperor Taizong showed his appreciation of Han's talent and authorized the establishment of administrative institutions according to the model of Song dynasty. The plan was carried out under the supervision of Han. In 1138, Emperor Xizong of Jin and Han Qixian started the Tianjuan reform which was designed to completely sinicize the administrative system of Jin dynasty. The old Jurchen Begile system was consequently abolished. As a result of the reform, the Jurchen led Jin dynasty began its shift from a nomadic tribal country to a Chinese dynasty.

Han died in 1146 at the age of 65. His full title was Duke Jianyi of Qiguo(齊國簡懿公).
