= Han Zhigu =

Han Zhigu 韓知古
- Born: 898; Jizhou Yutian, Liao dynasty
- Died: 930; Liao dynasty, Chinese
- Occupation: Minister of Liao
- Years active: ?–930
- Known for: Formulated the ordinance system for govern Liao and Han regions (制定典章制度 治理辽国汉地)
- Children: 11 sons
- Father: Han Rong (韩融)
- Family: Han Yi (韩懿; Han Zhigu's ancestor)

Chinese name
- Traditional Chinese: 韓知古
- Simplified Chinese: 韩知古
Transcriptions
Standard Mandarin
- Hanyu Pinyin: Hán Zhīgǔ

Han Zhigu (simplified Chinese: 韩知古; traditional Chinese: 韓知古; pinyin: Hán Zhīgǔ; 898–930) or known for his Khitan name as Diligulu (Chinese: 迪里姑鲁) was a Khitan-Liao Prime minister and politician. He was meritorious and known for his work for help Abaoji found the Liao dynasty.

It was said that he was good in strategy and knowledgeable and as Shulü Ping's assistant, he entered the official career and was reused. After she married with Abaoji, Han then entered the Yelü House as a courtier. He then started his career as a helper and was later appreciated by Abaoji own, then appointed him as a senior staff officer (高级参谋). Under Han Zhigu's impetus, the Han Chinese was captured by Abaoji and Han then placed in the repaired Liucheng (nowadays is Liaoyang, Liaoning), named "Bazhou Zhangwu Army" (霸州彰武军). In the 1st year of Shence era (916), he then became Zhangwu Army Jiedu Envoy (彰武军节度使), Southeast Road Disposal Officer (东南路处置使), trusted Yidu (信任益笃), General Manager (总知汉儿司事), Kaifuyi of Three Divisions (开府仪同三司), Shangshu Zuopushe and Zhongshu commander (尚书左仆射兼中书令). Han Zhigu also presided over the etiquette of various countries, participated in the Bohai Sea's suppression and made major contributions to the creation of the Liao Dynasty system. Since he made his major and significant contributions, he then called as "Successive heroes in pushing loyalty and deeds" ("推忠契运宣力功臣"). However, he later died in 930 during the 3rd year of Tianxian era.

== Issue ==
Although Han's wife didn't recorded, but they had 11 sons and they were:

1. Han Kuangtu (韩匡图), 1st son – a Grand Military Officer of State (彰国军 衙内都将).
2. Han Kuangye (韩匡业), 2nd son – a Situ (司徒) who served as the Tiancheng Army Jidu Envoy (天成军节度使).
3. Han Kuangsi (韩匡嗣), 3rd son – an Imperial physician who served under Empress Shulü Ping, honoured as King of Yan (燕王) and King of Qin (秦王).
4. Han Kuangyou (韩匡佑), 4th son – a Taifu (太傅) who served as the Linhai Army Jundu Envoy (临海军节度使).
5. Han Kuangmei (韩匡美), 5th son – a Taishi (太师) who served as the Yenching Army Commander (燕京统军使), Tianxiong Army Jiedu Envoy (天雄军节度使) and Political Order (政事令), honoured as King of Ye (邺王).
6. Han Kuangyin (韩匡胤), 6th son – a Taibao (太保) who served as Zhen'an Army Jiedu Envoy (镇安军节度使) and Envoy of the Ministry of Households (户部使).
7. Han Kuangzan (韩匡赞), 7th son – a Situ (司徒) who served as Zhen'an Army Jiedu Envoy (镇安军节度使).
8. Han Kuangwen (韩匡文), 8th son – a Palace attendant (殿中侍御史).
9. Han Kuangdao (韩匡道), 9th son – a Dongtou priest (东头供奉官).
10. Han Tuyushi (韩图育氏), 10th son – a Zhangwu Army Envoy (彰武军中军使).
11. Han Tangwudou (韩唐兀都), 11th son – a Xiongjun General (熊军将军).
