= Khitan name =

Personal names used by the Khitan People

Khitan names are the personal names of the Khitan people which ruled the Liao dynasty (907–1125) in ancient China and Kara-Khitan Khanate (1124–1218) in Central Asia. A nomadic Mongolic people, the Khitans have been extinct, making research on their cultures difficult. Currently, the Khitan language has largely not been deciphered, and the presence of 2 different writing systems - the Khitan large script and the Khitan small script, make research more difficult. The problem is compounded by the fact that most of the Liao history were recorded in written Chinese such as History of Liao, and transliteration into Chinese characters, which are logographic, is not always standard even in modern days, much less in ancient days when the pronunciation was different.

== Research ==
Research have shown that an aristocratic Khitan man, if one disregards the family name or clan name such as Yelü, may have four distinct personal names:

- the given name in Chinese, not always recorded
- the courtesy name, rarely encountered
- two names in Khitan, each possibly transliterated into Chinese in many different ways
  - one called "nickname" (小字), which consists of 1-3 Khitan words
  - one called "courtesy name" (字, which is unfortunately also the same character used to denote the courtesy name), which consists of one Khitan word and is not always recorded

The two names in Khitan can be joined by placing the Khitan courtesy name before the Khitan nickname. For first-born sons, the nickname is a variant of his father's Khitan courtesy name. This patronymic practice is similar to that observed in some Mongolian names with whom the Khitans are distantly related.

== Romanization ==
Usually, Khitan names are Romanized based on the pinyin spelling of the most common transliteration into Chinese characters.

== See also ==
- Khitan people
- Khitan language
- Khitan large script
- Khitan small script
- Chinese name
