= Tuyuhun language =

Extinct 5th-century language of northern China

Tuyuhun
- ‘Azha
- Native to: Tuyuhun
- Region: Northern China
- Ethnicity: Tuyuhun
- Era: 5th century
- Language family: Serbi–Mongolic: Para-Mongolic; Tuyuhun

Language codes
- ISO 639-3: None (mis)
- Glottolog: None

Tuyuhun (Chinese: 吐谷渾), also known as ‘Azha from Tibetan script, is an extinct language once spoken by the Tuyuhun of northern China about 500 AD. The existence of the Tuyuhun, and consequently their language, is first attested in the Book of Song, compiled around 488 AD.

== Classification ==
Alexander Vovin (2015) identifies the extinct Tuyuhun language as a Para-Mongolic language, meaning that Tuyuhun is related to the Mongolic languages as a sister clade but is not directly descended from the Proto-Mongolic language. The Khitan language is also a Para-Mongolic language. Tuyuhun had previously been identified by Paul Pelliot (1921) as a Mongolic language.

== Morphology ==
Tuyuhun suffixes:

- *-čin/*-čiñ [ཅིན་] (Old Tibetan *ʧin) ‘having X (possessive)’
- *-yin/*-yiñ [寅] (northern Early Middle Chinese **yir̃) ‘genitive-attributive suffix’

== Vocabulary ==
Shimunek (2017) reconstructs some Tuyuhun words as:

- ‘second person singular pronoun (爾)’: *čʰɪ [處] (northern Early Middle Chinese **tśʰɨ); Vovin (2015) reconstructs *čʰo, a 2nd person singular pronoun, equivalent to Mongolic či. The correspondence between /o/ and /i/ is attested between Mongolic and Khitan, cf. Western Middle Mongolic taqiya vs. Khitan t[i].qo.a.
- ‘river (川)’: *qɔl [ཁོལ་] (Old Tibetan *kʰol) ~ [ཀོལ་] (Old Tibetan *kol)
- ‘militant (武)’: *bu [戊] (Late Middle Chinese *mbu)
- ‘elder brother (兄)’: *aqañ [阿干] (northern Early Middle Chinese **ɦakar̃)
- ‘father (父)’ or ‘great’: *maʁa/*amaʁa [莫賀] (northern Early Middle Chinese *magɣa)
- ‘great’: *maʁa [མ་ག] (Old Tibetan *maga < Indic)
- ‘emperor, king’: *qʰaʁan [ཁ་གན་] (Old Tibetan *kʰagan) / **kʰaʁɣar̃ [可寒] ~ [可汗] (northern Early Middle Chinese **kʰaʁɣar̃)
- ‘wife (妻) of the khaghan (可汗)’: *qʰaʁʦʊn [恪尊] (northern Early Middle Chinese **kʰagʦor̃)

Vovin (2015) also reconstructs several words using Early Middle Chinese readings of transcribed Tuyuhun lexical items.
