= History of Liao =

Chinese historical book (1344)

- Traditional Chinese: 遼史
- Simplified Chinese: 辽史
Transcriptions
Standard Mandarin
- Hanyu Pinyin: Liáo Shǐ
Southern Min
- Hokkien POJ: Liâu-sú

The History of Liao, or Liao Shi (Liáo Shǐ), is an official Chinese historical work compiled during the Mongol-led Yuan dynasty (1271–1368), under the direction of the historian Toqto'a (Tuotuo), and finalized in 1344. Based on Khitan's primary sources and other previous official Chinese records, it details the Khitan people, Khitan's tribal life and traditions, as well as the official histories of the Liao dynasty and its successor, the Western Liao dynasty.

== Main sources ==
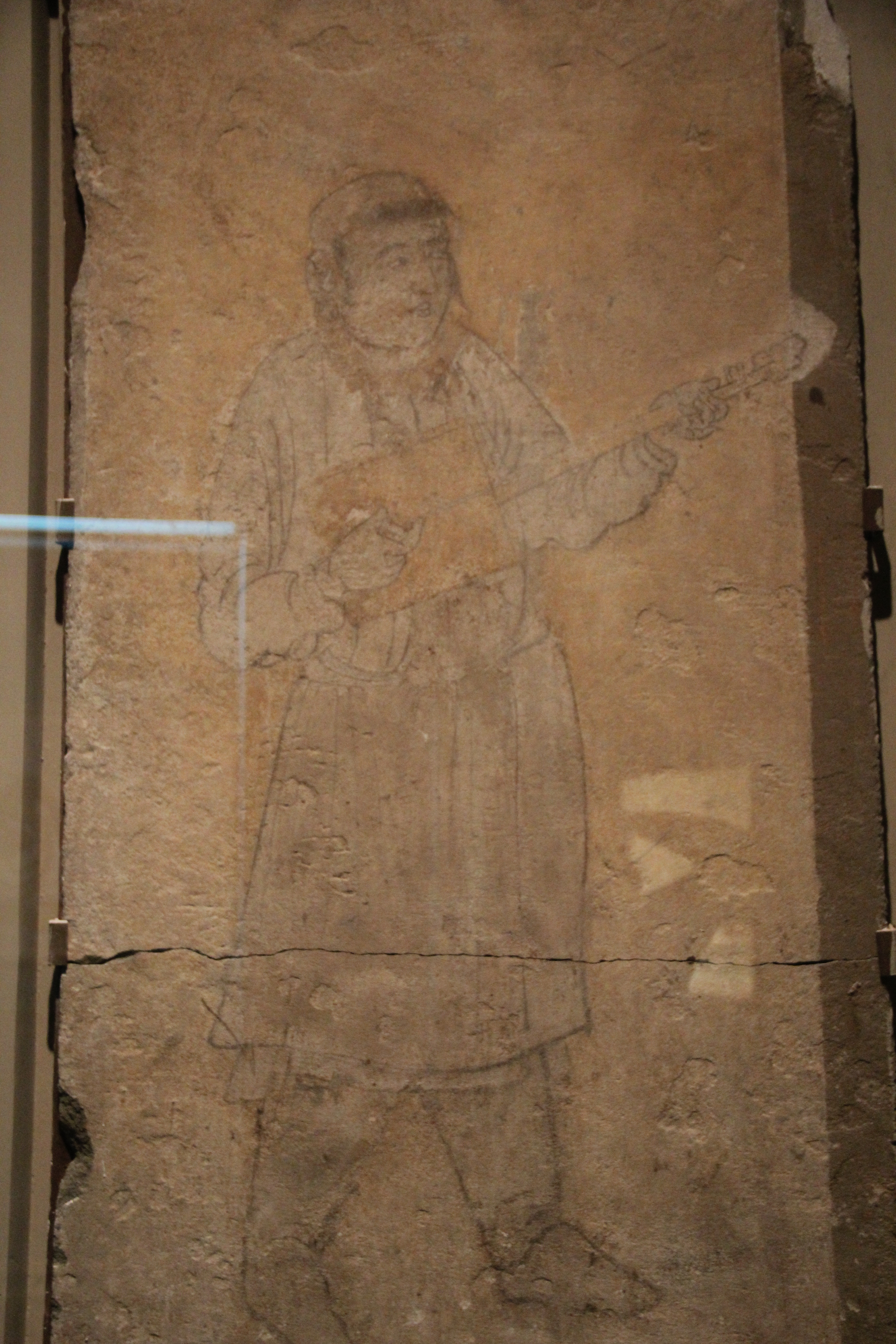
Khitan man playing a string instrument

History of Liao of 1344 was compiled using older sources, mainly:

- the Shilu 實錄 (Veritable Records), completed in the Liao dynasty (916–1125) under the direction of Yelü Yan (耶律儼), no longer extant;
- a draft Liao Shi, compiled in the Jurchen-led Jin dynasty under the direction of an official named Chen Daren (陳大任), never published and no longer extant;
- and several other sources such as the Zizhi Tongjian (1080's), Qidan Guo Zhi and other descriptions of the Khitans in the previous dynastic histories (Wei Shu, Sui Shu, ...).

The Liao Shi contains 116 volumes, including 30 volumes of Imperial Annals, 32 volumes of Records of Institutions, 8 volumes of Tables, 48 volumes of Biographies and Descriptions, and 1 volume of Glossary of National Language 國語解 Guoyijie (the Khitan language), which is a list of Khitan language words transcribed in Chinese characters. It is found in Chapter 116 (遼史/卷116).

== Creation and reliability ==
Many Chinese scholars of the time argued that the non-Han, "barbarian" Liao dynasty did not merit its own official history, but rather posited that the Liao histories should be an addendum to the history of the Song, which was ethnically Han Chinese. This was part of the larger dispute between the Yuan court and the Chinese literati scholars, in which the Chinese political theory whereby only one dynasty could be deemed legitimate at a time clashed with the Mongol's beliefs to the contrary. Due to this dispute between two different political cultures, the Liao Shi, as well as the histories of the concurrent Jin and Song dynasties, was not officially compiled until 1343–1344, when the pro-Chinese Chief Councillor Toqto'a took up the pre-Yuan histories project again. In its final form, this project conceded to the Yuan court's desire to treat the Liao, Jin, and Song as equally legitimate dynasties. The compilation of the Liao Shi was finished in one year by imperial historians, although without undergoing any but the most minimal of proofreadings. Because of this, the Liao Shi and the other two pre-Yuan histories are known for their technical errors, lack of precision, inconsistencies in transcribing non-Chinese terms and names, and over-lapping subject matter. Qing scholars Qian Daxin and Zhao Yi noted inconsistencies in the History of Liao in their works Study of the Discrepancies in the Twenty-two Standard Histories (廿二史劄記) and Critical Notes on the Twenty-two Histories (二十二史劄記). Nonetheless, the Liao Shi provides a large amount of knowledge on Khitan's imperium's tribal politics and traditions. Since Yelü Yan's Shilu and Chen Daren's Liao Shi have been lost, Toqto'a's Liao Shi is the only extant Chinese-style historical record of the Liao dynasty.

== Editions ==
The work of collation and punctuation has been done several times, by example in the Qianlong edition, the Nanjian edition, the Beijian edition, Baina edition and the Daoguang edition.

The edition commonly used nowadays is the Zhonghua Shuju Press edited Liao Shi, under the direction of the Khitan studies' specialists Feng Jiasheng and Chen Shu, and based on the Baina edition. This Zhonghua Shuju Press version and its annotations also refer to other historical sources such as the Cefu Yuangui, Zizhi Tongjian, Xu Zizhi Tongjian Changbian, Jiu & Xin Tangshu, Jiu & Xin Wudai Shi, Song Shi, Jin Shi, Qidan Guo Zhi and Liao Wenhui.

The History of Liao was translated into Manchu as ᡩᠠᡳᠯᡳᠶᠣᠣ
ᡤᡠᡵᡠᠨ ‍‍ᡳ
ᠰᡠᡩᡠᡵᡳ (Wylie: Dailiyoo gurun i suduri, Möllendorff: Dailiyoo gurun i suduri).

The Qing dynasty Qianlong Emperor erroneously identified the Khitan people and their language with the Solons, leading him to use the Solon language to "correct" Chinese character transcriptions of Khitan names in the History of Liao in his "Imperial Liao Jin Yuan Three Histories National Language Explanation" (欽定遼金元三史國語解 Qinding Liao Jin Yuan sanshi guoyujie) project.

Qianlong's "corrections" ended up compounding the errors and making the transcription of some foreign words even worse. Marshall Broomhall wrote that So unscientific was this work that the K'ien-lung editions of the Liao, Kin, and Yüan histories are practically useless. Emil Bretschneider demonstrated how the etymologies in the Qianlong edition were incorrect.

== Content ==
The annals are covered in Volumes 1-30 beginning with founder Abaoji (Taizu) in volumes 1–2. Volume 30 covers Yelü Dashi, who fled and founded of the state of Qara Khitai also known as the Western Liao at the dissolution of the Liao dynasty. Biran describes volume 30 of the text as one of the most important sources for the history of the Qara Khitai.

Treatises are covered in volumes 31–62. The administrative divisions of the Liao are described in volumes 37 through 41 under the title Geography (地理), organized by the five primary level circuits (道). Official posts (百官) are described in volumes 45–48. Standen gives English translations for some of the official posts in a glossary.

Volumes 63–70 are tables including the lineage of the ruling Yelü clan as well as other clans in volume 63, tribes (部族) in volume 69, and vassal states (屬國) in volume 70.

Notable figures included in the Biographies section include Han Yanhui, Liao chancellor of Han origin in volume 74; Zhao Yanshou general from the Later Tang who also served the Liao in volume 76; and Wang Jizhong 王繼忠, who helped broker the Chanyuan Treaty of 1004–1005 in volume 81.

== Legacy ==
The debate about the legacy of the Liao as a legitimate dynasty continued after the completion of the text. Around the time of publication Yang Weizhen stated that only the Song was a legitimate dynasty and the Liao and Jin were usurpers. He continued to argue this point and composed an essay titled 'On legitimate Succession' 正統辯. Ming scholar Wang Zhu 王洙 wrote an alternative history of the Song titled Verified History of the Song 宋史質 in which the Liao and Jin states were relegated to treatises on foreign states. However, Wang Chu's text received criticism itself from Qing scholars who viewed it as an intentional distortion of history. In addition, the text Great Outline of Historical Records by Ming scholar Shao Jingbang 邵經邦 (1491–1561) gave the Liao and Jin the status of alien usurpers.
