= Yu Deuk-gong =

Korean scholar (1749–1807)

- Hangul: 유득공
- Hanja: 柳得恭
- RR: Yu Deukgong
- MR: Yu Tŭkkong

Yu Deuk-gong (Korean: 유득공; Hanja: 柳得恭; 1749–1807) was a Korean scholar during the Joseon Dynasty. He is remembered today for his work in recovering the history of Balhae, which had not generally been considered part of Korean history before his time.

== See also ==
- History of Korea
- Balhaego
