= Qidan Guo Zhi =

13th-century book by Ye Longli

- Author: Ye Longli (葉隆禮)
- Language: Classical Chinese
- Subject: History of the Liao dynasty
- Publication date: after 1247, possibly 1265–1274 (preface mistakenly dated 1180)
- Publication place: Song dynasty

Qidan Guo Zhi
- Traditional Chinese: 契丹國志
- Simplified Chinese: 契丹国志
Transcriptions
Standard Mandarin
- Hanyu Pinyin: Qìdān Guó Zhì
- Wade–Giles: Ch'i-tan kuo chih

Qidan Guo Zhi ("Records of the Khitan State") is a 13th-century Chinese book chronicling the history of the Liao dynasty (916–1125) and the Khitan people. It was written by Ye Longli of the Southern Song dynasty, probably published 1265–1274 during Emperor Duzong's reign, even though the preface claimed it was submitted to the throne in 1180. Ye Longli did not pass the imperial examination until 1247.

== Contents ==
Consisting of 27 chapters (卷), the book includes history about the Khitan people before the foundation of the Liao dynasty, although this section is laden with superstition. The book primarily relies on sources from the Northern Song dynasty and thus differs from the History of Liao which is mainly based on official records from the Liao dynasty itself.
