= Parhaego =

History book on Balhae published in 1784

- Hangul: 발해고
- Hanja: 渤海考
- RR: Balhaego
- MR: Parhaego

Parhaego (Korean: 발해고; Hanja: 渤海考) or the Reflections on Balhae is a history book about the Balhae civilization, written by Yu Deuk-gong, who was a Silhak (practical studies) scholar during the Joseon Dynasty. It describes the kings of Balhae, the vassals of Balhae, its geography and geology, government system, foods and clothing. It is an early book that argued that Balhae should be included as a part of Korean history. Parhaego is notable for referring to Balhae and Silla as the northern and southern kingdoms, within a unified account of Korean history.

The first modern edition was published by the Chōsen Kosho Kankōkai in 1910.

== Purpose ==
The author criticizes how the official government history of Goryeo did not include Balhae. The front of the book argues that Balhae's history should be accepted into Korean history. He made it clear that Balhae was the heir of Goguryeo, and brought it into the category of Korean folk history.

He also claimed that because Goryeo did not publish the history of the project, he could not claim the territorial rights of Jurchen and Khitan, which occupied Goguryeo and Balhae. In this regard, Parhaego's historical location is very important.

== Contents ==
The Parhaego is composed of a total of nine sections, including a study of successive kings and a study of civil and military officials and scholars, as well as an examination of local administration, the system of official positions, the attire of civil and military officials, the form of the capital Donggyeong, local products, titles used in Balhae, diplomatic documents with other countries, and Jeonganguk, which was established by the refugees of Balhae after the fall of Balhae.

=== Preface by Pak Chega ===
Park Pak Chega, a practical scholar of Bukhakpa during the reign of King Jeongjo of the Joseon Dynasty, wrote about his friend, Yu Dŭkgong, saying, "This book is in line with his previous reviews."

Because my friend Yu Hyepung is knowledgeable, well written, and knows details of the past. What he is trying to say is that Wang, the founder of Goryeo Dynasty, lamented that he could not restore Goguryeo territory. So I found that it was in accord with what I had previously reviewed, and I was struck by Yu Hyepung's talent for observing the situation of the world and observing the resources of the king.
