= Juha Janhunen =

Finnish linguist (born 1952)

- Born: Juha Antero Janhunen; 12 February 1952 (age 74); Pori, Finland

Academic work
- Discipline: Linguist
- Institutions: University of Helsinki
- Main interests: Mongolic languages

Juha Antero Janhunen (born 12 February 1952) is a Finnish linguist whose wide interests include Uralic and Mongolic languages. Since 1994, he has been Professor in East Asian studies at the University of Helsinki. He has done fieldwork on Samoyedic languages and on Khamnigan Mongol. More recently, he has collaborated with Chinese scholar Wu Yingzhe to produce a critical edition of two newly discovered Liao dynasty epitaphs written in the Khitan small script. Janhunen has also worked along with Ekaterina Gruzdeva on revitalizing the Nivkh language.

He is a critic of the Altaic hypothesis.

== Notable works ==
- Janhunen, Juha (1977). Samojedischer Wortschatz: Gemeinsamojedische Etymologien [Samoyedic Vocabulary: Common Samoyedic Etymologies]. Helsinki: Finno-Ugrian Society, University of Helsinki. ISBN 951-45-1161-1.
- Janhunen, Juha, ed. (2003). The Mongolic languages. London: Routledge.
- Janhunen, Juha, ed. (2005). Khamnigan Mongol. Munich: Lincom Europa.
- Yingzhe, Wu; Janhunen, Juha (2010). New Materials on the Khitan Small Script: A Critical Edition of Xiao Dilu and Yelü Xiangwen. Folkestone, Kent: Global Oriental.
- Janhunen, Juha (2012). Mongolian. Amsterdam/Philadelphia: John Benjamins.
