= Khitan language =

Para-Mongolic extinct language

Khitan
- Kitan
- Native to: Northeastern China, southeastern Mongolia, eastern Siberia
- Region: Northern and Eastern Asia
- Extinct: literary form in 1244 with the death of Yelü Chucai, last person known who could speak and write Khitan
- Language family: Serbi–Mongolic: Para-Mongolic; Khitan
- Writing system: Khitan large script and Khitan small script

Official status
- Official language in: Liao dynasty, Qara Khitai

Language codes
- ISO 639-3: zkt
- Glottolog: kita1247

Khitan or Kitan ( in large script or in small, Khitai; Chinese: 契丹語, Qìdānyǔ), also known as Liao, is an extinct language once spoken in Northeast Asia by the Khitan people (4th to 13th century CE). It was the official language of the Liao Empire (907–1125) and the Qara Khitai (1124–1218). Owing to a narrow corpus of known words and a partially undeciphered script, the language has yet to be completely reconstructed.

== Classification ==
Khitan appears to have been related to the Mongolic languages; Juha Janhunen states: "Today, however, the conception is gaining support that Khitan was a language in some respects radically different from the historically known Mongolic languages. If this view proves to be correct, Khitan is, indeed, best classified as a Para-Mongolic language."

Alexander Vovin (2017) argues that Khitan has several Koreanic loanwords. Since both the Korean Goryeo dynasty and the Khitan Liao dynasty claimed to be successors of Goguryeo, it is possible that the Koreanic words in Khitan were borrowed from the language of Goguryeo.

== Script ==
Khitan was written using two mutually exclusive writing systems known as the Khitan large script and the Khitan small script. The small script, which was a syllabary, was used until the Jurchen-speaking Jin dynasty (1115–1234) replaced it with the Jurchen script in 1191. The large script was logographic like Chinese.

== Records ==
Prior to the 19th century, only one Khitan text, the Langjun inscription, was known to scholarship in China; however, the inscription was thought by Ming and Qing scholars to be written in the Jurchen script.

The 14th century History of Liao contains a volume of Khitan words transcribed in Chinese characters titled "Glossary of National Language" (國語解). It is found in Chapter 116.

The Qianlong Emperor of the Qing dynasty erroneously identified the Khitan people and their language with the Solons, leading him to use the Solon language to "correct" Chinese character transcriptions of Khitan names in the History of Liao in his Imperial Liao-Jin-Yuan Three Histories National Language Explanation (欽定遼金元三史國語解) project.

The Liao dynasty referred to the Khitan language with the term Guoyu (國語, "National language"), which was also used by other non-Han Chinese dynasties in China to refer to their languages like Manchu of the Qing, Classical Mongolian during the Yuan dynasty, Jurchen during the Jin, and Xianbei during the Northern Wei. Even today, Mandarin is referred to in Taiwan as Guoyu.

== Vocabulary ==
There are several closed systems of Khitan lexical items for which systematic information is available. The following is a list of words in these closed systems that are similar to Mongolic. Mongolian and Daur equivalents are given after the English translation:

=== Seasons ===
Khitan	Translation	Mongolian script	modern Mongolian pronunciation	Daur
heu.ur	spring	qabur	havar	haor
ju.un	summer	ǰun	zun	najir
n.am.ur	autumn	namur	namar	namar
u.ul	winter	ebül	övöl	uwul

=== Numerals ===
Khitan	Translation	Mongolian script	modern Mongolian pronunciation	Daur
*omc	one	onča 'unique'	onts (unique)	enqu
j.ur.er	second	ǰirin 'two'	jirin (two), jiremsen (double/pregnant)	jieeq
hu.ur.er	third	ɣurba 'three'	gurav, gurvan, guramsan (triple)	guarab
durer/duren	fourth	dörben	döröv, dörvön	durub
tau	five	tabun	tav, tavan	taawu
t.ad.o.ho	fifth	tabu-daki	tav dahi	taawudar
*nil	six	ǰirɣuɣan	zurgaa (innovation "jir'gur" or 2x3)	jirwoo
da.lo.er	seventh	doluɣ-a 'seven'	doloo	doloo
n.ie.em	eight	naima 'eight'	naim	naim
*is	nine	yisü	yüs, yüsön	is
par (p.ar)	ten	arban	arav	harbin
jau	hundred	ǰaɣun	zuu, zuun	jao
ming	thousand	mingɣan	myanga, myangan	mianga

=== Animals ===
Khitan	Translation	Mongolian script	modern Mongolian pronunciation	Daur
te.qo.a	chicken	taqiy-a	tahia	kakraa
ni.qo	dog	noqai	nohoi	nowu
s.au.a	bird	sibaɣu	shuvuu	degii
em.a	goat	imaɣ-a	yamaa	imaa
tau.li.a	rabbit	taulai	tuulai	tauli
mo.ri	horse	mori	mori	mori
uni	cow	üniy-e	ünee	unie
mu.ho.o	snake	moɣoi	mogoi	mowo

=== Directions ===
Khitan	Translation	Mongolian script	modern Mongolian pronunciation	Daur
ud.ur	east	dorun-a	dorno	garkui
dzi.ge.n	left	ǰegün	züün	solwoi
bo.ra.ian	right	baraɣun	baruun	baran
dau.ur.un	middle	dumda	dund	duand
xe.du.un	horizontal	köndelen	höndölön	
ja.cen.i	border	ǰaqa	zasan, zaag	jag

=== Time ===
Khitan	Translation	Mongolian script	modern Mongolian pronunciation	Daur
suni	night	söni	shönö	suni
un.n/un.e	now, present	önö	önöö	nee

=== Personal relations ===
Khitan	Translation	Mongolian script	modern Mongolian pronunciation	Daur
c.i.is	blood	čisu	tsus	qos
mo ku	female	em-e	em	emwun
deu	younger sibling	degüü	düü	deu
n.ai.ci	friend	nayiǰa	naiz	guq
na.ha.an	uncle	naɣača	nagats	naoq
s.ia/s.en	good	sayin	sain	sain
g.en.un	sadness, regret	genü='to regret' in the letter of Arghun Khan)	genen, gem	gemxbei
ku	person	kümün	hün, hümün	huu

=== Tribal administration ===
Khitan	Translation	Mongolian script	Daur
cau.ur	war	čagur, as in "tsa'urgalan dairakh"	quagur
nai/nai.d	heads, officials	"-d" is a plural suffix=noyan, noyad for plural	noyin
t.em-	to bestow a title	temdeg 'sign'	temgeet
k.em	decree	kem kemjiye 'law/norm'	hes
us.gi	letter	üseg	jiexgen
ui	matter	üyile	urgil
qudug	blessed	qutuɣ	hireebei
xe.se.ge	part, section, province	keseg	meyen
ming.an	military unit of thousand	minggan	miangan

=== Basic verbs ===
Khitan	Translation	Mongolian script
p.o	become	bol-
p.o.ju	raise(intr.)	bos-
on.a.an	fall	una-
x.ui.ri.ge.ei	transfer	kür-ge-
u-	give	ög-
sa-	to reside	sagu-
a-	be	a- 'live', as in "aj ahui"

=== Natural objects ===
Khitan	Translation	Mongolian script	modern Mongolian pronunciation	Daur
eu.ul	cloud	egüle	üül	eulen
s.eu.ka	dew	sigüderi	shüüder	suider
sair	moon	sara	sar	saruul
nair	sun	nara	nar	nar
m.em/m.ng	silver	mönggö	möng	mungu

The Liaoshi records in Chapter 53:

國語謂是日為「討賽咿兒」。「討」五；「賽咿兒」，月也。

In the national (Khitan) language this day (5th day of the 5th lunar month) is called 'Tao Saiyier'. 'Tao' means five; 'Saiyier' means moon/month.

'Tao Saiyier' corresponds to Mongolian 'tavan sar' (fifth moon/month).

In the first passage of Qidan Guo Zhi (History of the Khitan State), the word ″zhao-ding″ appears. Most likely, this word refers to the ″jad″ institution that existed among nomadic peoples. Thus, among the ancient Mongols, members of each lineage called their fellow clansmen ″urukh″, while members of other lineages were called ″jad″. For every member of an ancient Mongol lineage, a clansman was ″urukh″ (~ ″urug″ meaning a descendant, offspring of a given lineage, and consequently a relative, kinsman, or own people); meanwhile, anything alien was ″jad″ (a stranger, foreigner). Thus, everyone was divided into ″urukh″ and ″jad″.

== Bibliography ==
- Janhunen, Juha (2006). "Para-Mongolic". In Janhunen, Juha (ed.). The Mongolic Languages. Routledge. pp. 391–402. ISBN 978-1-135-79690-7.
- Vovin, Alexander (2017). "Koreanic Loanwords in Khitan and Their Importance in the Decipherment of the Latter". Acta Orientalia Academiae Scientiarum Hungaricae. 70 (2): 207–215. doi:10.1556/062.2017.70.2.4.
