= Vivy =

Vivy may refer to:

- Vivy, Wallonia, a town in Belgium, now part of the municipality of Bouillon
- Vivy, Maine-et-Loire, a French municipality in the Maine-et-Loire department
- Grand-Vivy Castle in Switzerland
- Petit-Vivy Castle in Switzerland
- Vivy Yusof, Malaysian businesswoman
- Vivy: Fluorite Eye's Song, an anime series

== See also ==
- Vivi (disambiguation)
