= Dao language =

Dao may be,

- Dao language (China)
- Dao language (Papuan), of Indonesian New Guinea
