= Selibu language =

Chinese–Tibetan mixed language of Southwest China

Selibu
- Shuimo
- Native to: China
- Region: Gyälthang Town, Deqen Prefecture
- Ethnicity: Hui people
- Native speakers: 900 (2022)
- Language family: mixed Mandarin–Khams

Language codes
- ISO 639-3: None (mis)

The Selibu language (Chinese: 希里布; pinyin: Xīlǐbù; autonym: ɕə⁴⁴li⁴⁴bu³¹, Tibetan transliteration: sre gleng ba po) is a Mandarin–Khams mixed language spoken by ethnic Hui people in Gyälthang Municipality, Deqen Prefecture. Its core base is Southwestern Mandarin, with some residual Zhongyuan Mandarin features.

== Overview ==
Selibu's lexicon and grammatical morphemes are primarily derived from Southwest Mandarin, but also has many morphosyntatic and semantic features that are derived from Alangu Tibetan, a Khams Tibetan dialect. It is spoken by about 900 people in Gyälthang Municipality (建塘镇), Deqen Prefecture, northwestern Yunnan.

Selibu is also known as Shuimo fanghua 水磨房话. The original settlement was Shuimofang 水磨房 in Annan Village 安南村, Sanba Naxi Township 三坝纳西族乡. In 1950, some families moved to the hamlets of Longwangbian 龙王边 and Lanjia 兰家 in Haba Village 哈巴村, Sanba Naxi Township 三坝纳西族乡.

== See also ==
- Dao language (China)
- Wutun language
