= Bolze =

Language of Switzerland mixing French and Swiss German

Bolze is a mixed language spoken in the Basse-Ville (Lower Town) of Fribourg, Switzerland. Categorized colloquially as a mix of mixture of French and Swiss German, linguists classify it more precisely as a three-way contact language combining the local Arpitan dialect of Friborgês, Senslerdeutsch dialect of German from Sense District and Standard French. Bolze came into being as a result of the immigration of German speakers from the Sense District of the Canton of Fribourg starting from the 19th century. By 2019 the language was reportedly spoken only by a handful of locals.

== Origins ==
The city of Fribourg is situated on the Röstigraben, the linguistic boundary dividing the French- and German-speaking regions of Switzerland. Historically, French-speaking elites controlled the upper city (Haute-Ville), while the deep, isolated river bend of the Sarine formed the working-class Basse-Ville (Lower Town).

Between the 19th century and the 1940s, a massive influx of landless, impoverished German-speaking farmers from the neighboring rural Sense District migrated to Fribourg's Basse-Ville in search of factory work. They settled alongside the existing, poor Romance-speaking working class. Because of the density, low-income housing, and geographic isolation of the Lower Town, these two linguistic groups integrated deeply.

At the start of this migration, the dominant Romance language spoken by the working-class population of the Basse-Ville was not standard French, but rather the local patois, a dialect of the Friborgês variety of Franco-Provençal. Consequently, the early linguistic fusion that formed Bolze was not simply between French and German, but primarily between the patois spoken by the urban poor and the Allemannic Senslerdeutsch spoken by the newly arrived rural laborers.

As Standard French gradually supplanted the local patois in public education and urban daily life throughout the 19th and 20th centuries, standard French elements were integrated into Bolze, shifting its Romance matrix from patois to French, while retaining a strong substrate of the regional Franco-Provençal vocabulary and syntax.

== See also ==
- Fribourg
- Swiss German
- Sense District
- Friborgês
