= Barberêche Castle =

Castle in Fribourg, Switzerland

- Courtepin
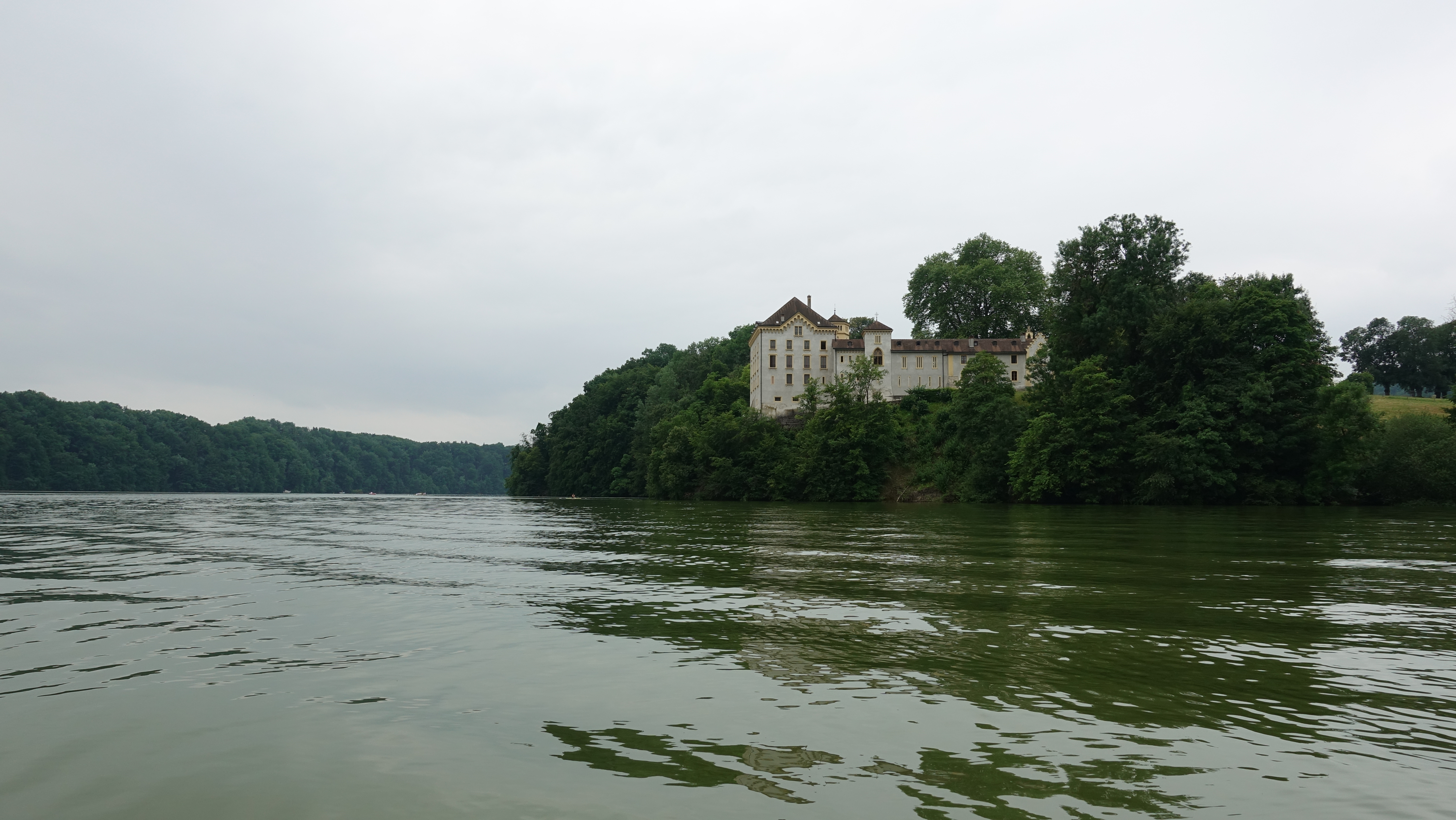
- Barberêche Castle as seen from Schiffenensee (lake).

Site information
- Code: CH-FR

Location
- Coordinates: 46.857853°N 7.165775°E

Site history
- Built: 1522

Barberêche Castle is a castle in the former municipality of Barberêche (now part of Courtepin) in the Canton of Fribourg in Switzerland. It is a Swiss Heritage Site of National Significance.

It is located on the edge of the nearby plateau, above the Schiffenensee lakeshore.

== History ==
Barberêche Castle was built between 1522 and 1528, likely on the site of an earlier fortification, under Petermann de Praroman's direction in the Late Gothic style.

From 1839 until 1844, the castle underwent considerable remodeling, whereby the castle took its current shape in the Gothic Revival and Neoclassical styles.

The castle is currently privately owned.

== See also ==
- Castles in the canton of Fribourg
- List of castles and fortresses in Switzerland
