= Petuh =

Mixed language from the German-Danish border

Petuh (Petu) is a mixed language of Flensburg, a mixture of German, Low German, Danish, and Southern Jutish spoken in Flensburg on the German–Danish border. It is High German in vocabulary (with some Danish concepts and loan translations), but it has Danish and Low Saxon grammar and syntax. It originated in the 19th century and was still vibrant in the 1950s, but it is now on the verge of extinction.

Petuh is named after the partoutbillet (Danish for "season ticket", from French partout "everywhere" and billet "ticket, pass") granting unlimited access to the ferries in the Flensburg Fjord. The owners of such season tickets were known as petuhtants and were mostly older women who met on the excursion boats and in the cafes along the fjord.

| Petu | German |
|---|---|
| Wie kann ich sitzen bei ausses Licht un zue Rollo'n un nähn abbe Knöppe an? | Wie kann ich bei ausgeschaltetem Licht und geschlossenen Rollos sitzen und abgerissene Knöpfe annähen? |
| besüsseln | jemanden hegen und pflegen |
| figellinsch | schlitzohrig |
| Kinner einlegen | Kinder ins Bett bringen |

| Petuh | Danish | German |
|---|---|---|
| abbe Knüpfe (/ Knöppe) | knapper, der er gået/revet af | abgerissene Knöpfe |
| abklippen | klippe af | abschneiden |
| Fatuch | karklud, or, archaically, fadeklud (sønderjysk: faklu/fæklue) | Spültuch |
| figellinsch | vanskelig | schwierig |
| Feudel | gulvklud or: føjlstyk (sønderjysk) | Putzlappen |
| feudeln | vaske gulvet or: føjel æ gol (sønderjysk) | Boden putzen |
| flütten | flytte | umziehen |
| Kinder or: Kinners passen | passe børn | auf Kinder aufpassen |
| Kinner einlegen | få/lægge børnene i seng | Kinder ins Bett bringen |
| mallören | ulykke or: malør (sønderjysk) | Unglück |
| Schau | sjov | Spaß |
| Stackel | stakkel | Ärmster |
| süßeln or: besüßeln | sysle | beschäftigen |
| Tummelum | tummel or: uro | Unruhe |
| Is dat Sünde! | Det er synd! or: Hvor er det synd! | Ist das schade or: Das ist schade! |
| Dat mit dem Jensen is voll Sünde, nich? | Det er rigtig synd med Jensen, ikke sandt? | Schlimm, was dem Jensen passiert ist, oder? |
| Dascha ’n Maars un kriegn ’n guten Platz in’n Unibus! | Det er et mas at få en god plads i bussen! | Es ist schwer, im Omnibus einen guten Platz zu bekommen! |
| Nun sollen wir mal sehen und kommen los. | Nu skal vi se at komme af sted. | Jetzt wollen wir mal los. |
| So'n Aggewars! | Hvor er det besværligt! or: Sikken aggevas! (sønderjysk) | Oh, ist das mühsam! |
| Wie kann ein sitzen bei außes Licht und zue Rollon und näh´n abbe Knöppe an? | Hvordan kan man sidde med slukket lys og nedrullede gardiner og sy afrevne knapper på? | Wie kann eine (man) bei ausgeschaltetem Licht und geschlossenen Rollos sitzen und abgerissene Knöpfe annähen? |
