= Courtepin =

- Municipality
- Flag Coat of arms
- Location of Courtepin
- Location within Switzerland Location within Canton of Fribourg
- Coordinates: 46°52′N 7°7′E
- Country: Switzerland
- Canton: Fribourg
- District: See

Government
  - Executive: Conseil communal with 7 members
  - Mayor: Syndic

Area
  - Total: 21.92 km^{2} (8.46 sq mi)
- Elevation: 578 m (1,896 ft)

Population (December 2020)
  - Total: 5,503
  - Density: 251.0/km^{2} (650.2/sq mi)
- Time zone: UTC+01:00 (CET)
  - Summer (DST): UTC+02:00 (CEST)
- Postal code: 1784
- SFOS number: 2254
- ISO 3166 code: CH-FR
- Localities: Courtepin, Courtaman
- Surrounded by: Barberêche, Gurmels, Misery-Courtion, Wallenried
- Website: www.courtepin.ch

Courtepin (French: [kuʁtəpɛ̃]; Arpitan: Cortepin) is a municipality in the district of See in the canton of Fribourg in Switzerland. On 1 January 2017 Barberêche, Villarepos and Wallenried merged into the extant municipality of Courtepin.

== History ==
Aerial view (1964)

Courtepin is first mentioned in 1259 as Courtipin. The municipality was formerly known by its German name Curtepy, however, that name is no longer used.

== Geography ==
After the 2017 merger Courtepin had an area of 21.87 km^{2} (8.44 sq mi). Before the merger Courtepin had an area, (as of the 2004/09 survey) of 4.08 square kilometers (1.58 sq mi). Of this area, about 46.3% is used for agricultural purposes, while 27.7% is forested. Of the rest of the land, 25.5% is settled (buildings or roads) and 0.5% is unproductive land. In the 2013/18 survey a total of 86 ha (210 acres) or about 21.3% of the total area was covered with buildings, an increase of 49 ha (120 acres) over the 1981 amount. Over the same time period, the amount of recreational space in the municipality increased by 1 ha (2.5 acres) and is now about 1.24% of the total area. Of the agricultural land, 3 ha (7.4 acres) is used for orchards and vineyards, 171 ha (420 acres) is fields and grasslands. Since 1981 the amount of agricultural land has decreased by 50 ha (120 acres). Rivers and lakes cover 4 ha (9.9 acres) in the municipality.

Of the built up area, industrial buildings made up 4.2% of the total area while housing and buildings made up 12.3% and transportation infrastructure made up 6.7%. Power and water infrastructure as well as other special developed areas made up 1.5% of the area Out of the forested land, 26.4% of the total land area is heavily forested and 1.5% is covered with orchards or small clusters of trees. Of the agricultural land, 32.3% is used for growing crops and 12.8% is pastures, while 1.5% is used for orchards or vine crops. All the water in the municipality is flowing water.

The municipality is located in the Lac/See district, on the French/German language border. The municipality has a majority of French speakers. It consists of the rural section of Vieux Quartier and the town-like section of Quartier Neuf. Quartier Neuf developed around the Fribourg-Murten/Morat railway train station, when it was built in 1898.

On 1 January 2003 the former municipality of Courtaman merged into the municipality of Courtepin.

== Demographics ==
Courtepin has a population (as of December 2020) of 5,503. As of 2008, 37.0% of the population are resident foreign nationals. Over the last 10 years (2000–2010) the population has changed at a rate of 21.2%. Migration accounted for 11.7%, while births and deaths accounted for 10%.

Most of the population (as of 2000) speaks French (1,035 or 63.7%) as their first language, German is the second most common (298 or 18.3%) and Portuguese is the third (160 or 9.8%). There are 21 people who speak Italian.

As of 2008, the population was 50.8% male and 49.2% female. The population was made up of 923 Swiss men (29.3% of the population) and 678 (21.5%) non-Swiss men. There were 993 Swiss women (31.5%) and 559 (17.7%) non-Swiss women. Of the population in the municipality, 403 or about 24.8% were born in Courtepin and lived there in 2000. There were 519 or 31.9% who were born in the same canton, while 184 or 11.3% were born somewhere else in Switzerland, and 491 or 30.2% were born outside of Switzerland.

As of 2000, children and teenagers (0–19 years old) make up 29.2% of the population, while adults (20–64 years old) make up 62.1% and seniors (over 64 years old) make up 8.7%.

As of 2000, there were 670 people who were single and never married in the municipality. There were 838 married individuals, 65 widows or widowers and 53 individuals who are divorced.

As of 2000, there were 991 private households in the municipality, and an average of 2.7 persons per household. There were 150 households that consist of only one person and 57 households with five or more people. In 2000, a total of 596 apartments (91.4% of the total) were permanently occupied, while 37 apartments (5.7%) were seasonally occupied and 19 apartments (2.9%) were empty. As of 2009, the construction rate of new housing units was 22.7 new units per 1000 residents. The vacancy rate for the municipality, in 2010, was 1.49%.

The historical population is given in the following chart:

== Politics ==
In the 2011 federal election the most popular party was the SPS which received 30.9% of the vote. The next three most popular parties were the SVP (21.3%), the CVP (19.0%) and the FDP (7.7%).

The SPS gained an additional 5.2% of the vote from the 2007 Federal election (25.8% in 2007 vs 30.9% in 2011). The SVP retained about the same popularity (24.0% in 2007), the CVP retained about the same popularity (21.3% in 2007) and the FDP retained about the same popularity (9.3% in 2007). A total of 670 votes were cast in this election, of which 6 or 0.9% were invalid.

== Heritage sites of national significance ==
After the 2017 merger, Courtepin received several Swiss Heritage Sites. Grand-Vivy Castle, Barberêche Castle, Petit-Vivy Castle, the barn and stable at Chemin de la Fruiterie 5 A and the granary at Route de Grimoine 20 B are listed as Swiss heritage site of national significance. The area around Petit and Grand-Vivy is part of the Inventory of Swiss Heritage Sites.

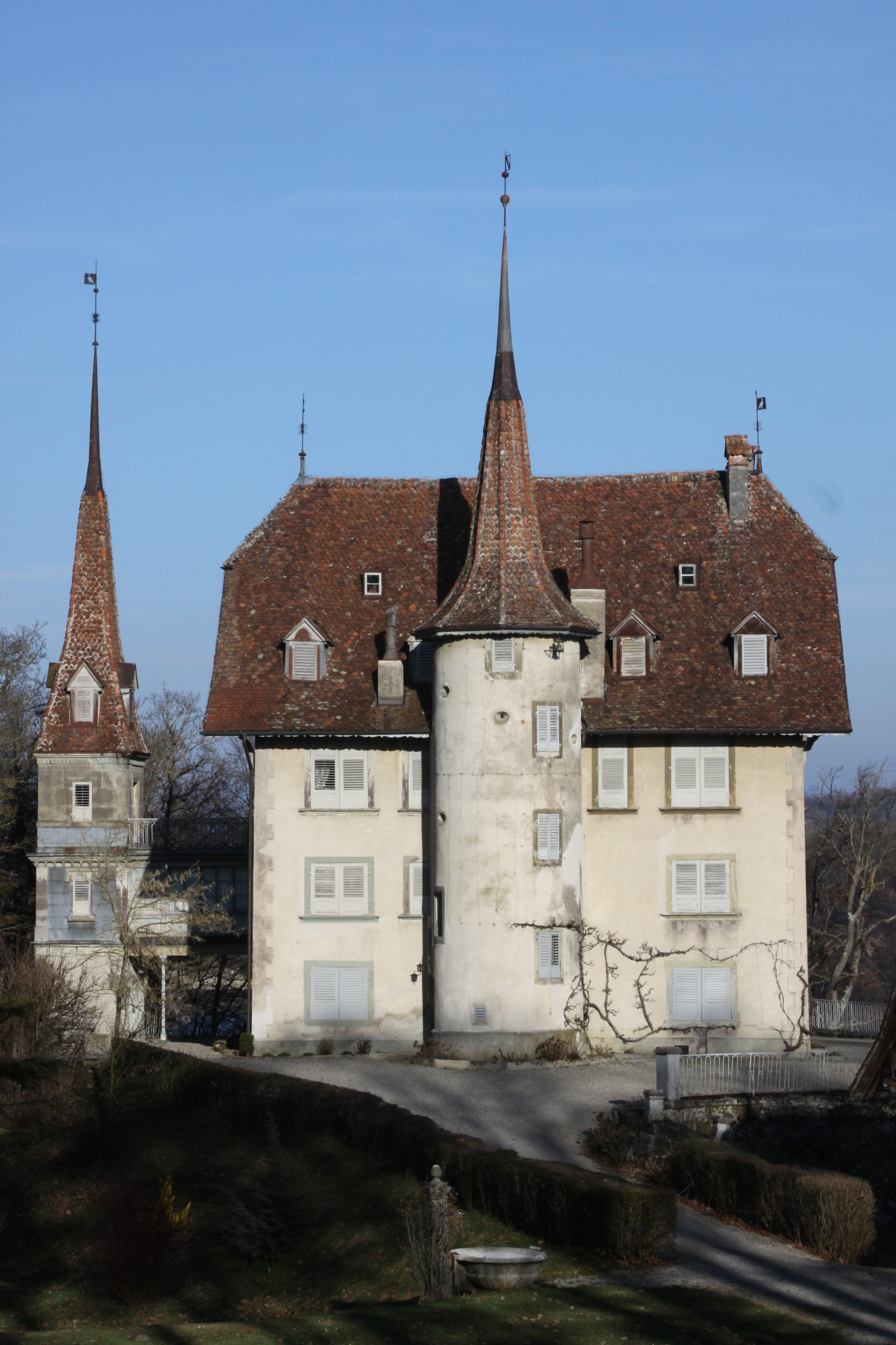
Grand-Vivy Castle

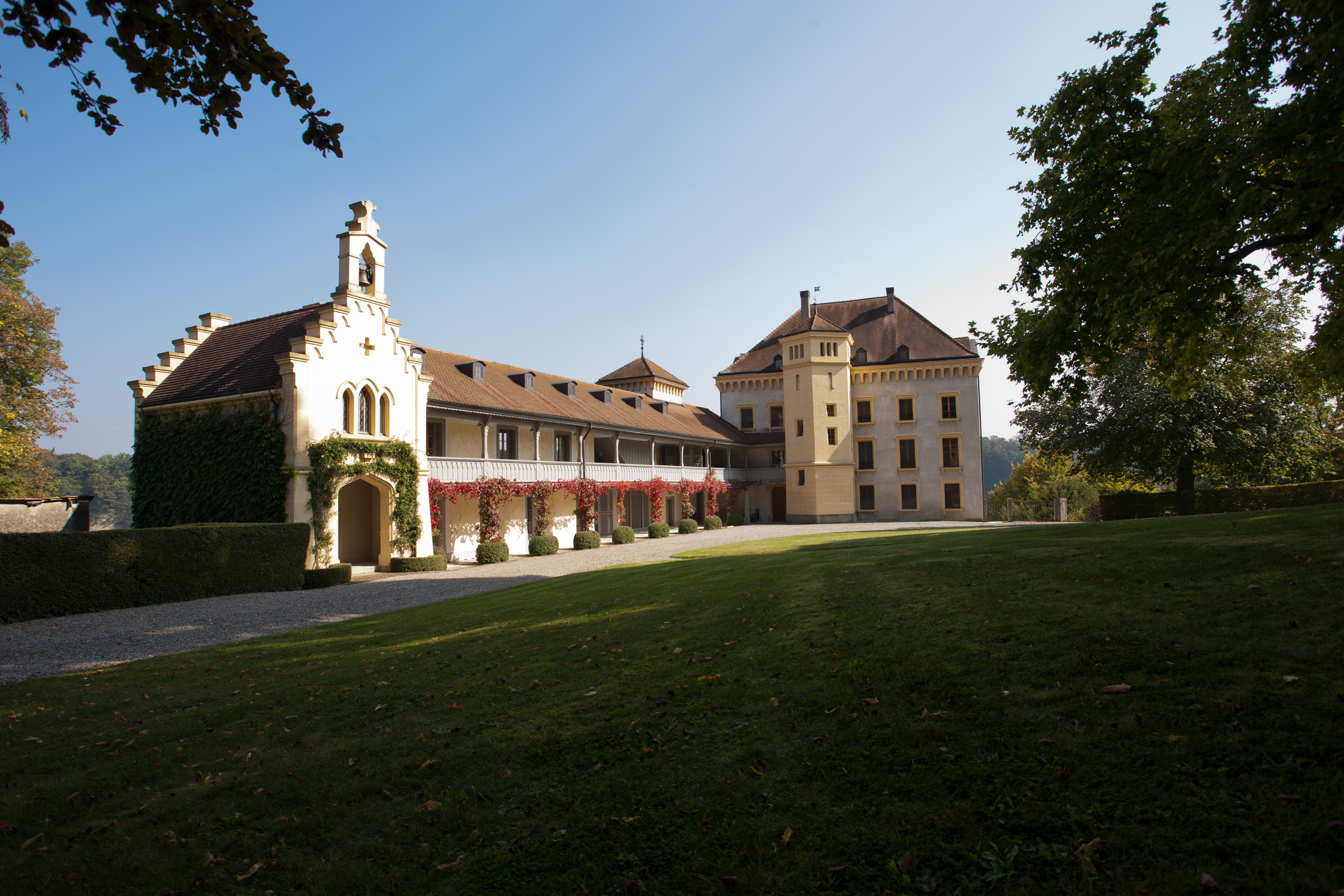
Barberêche Castle

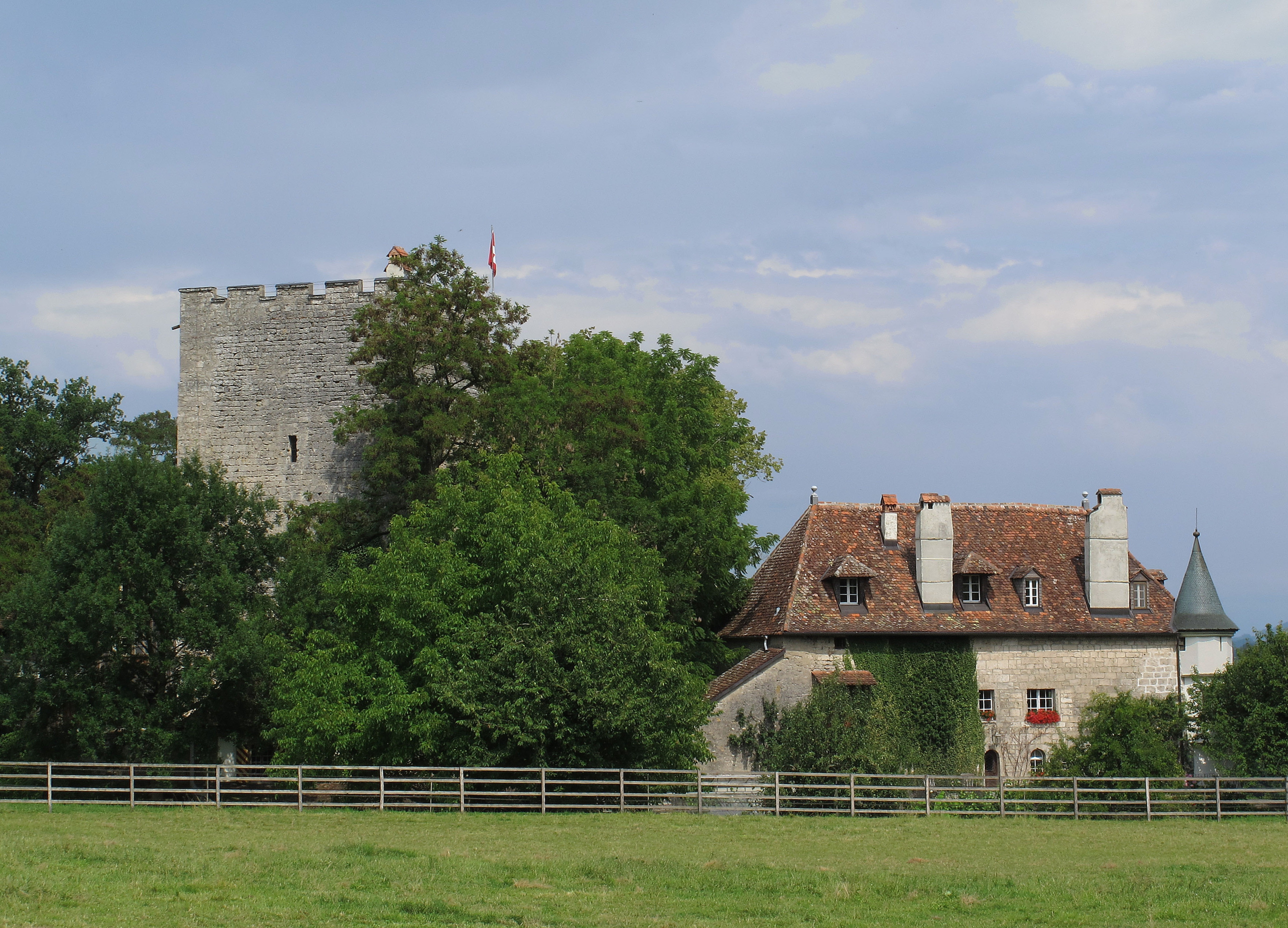
Petit-Vivy Castle

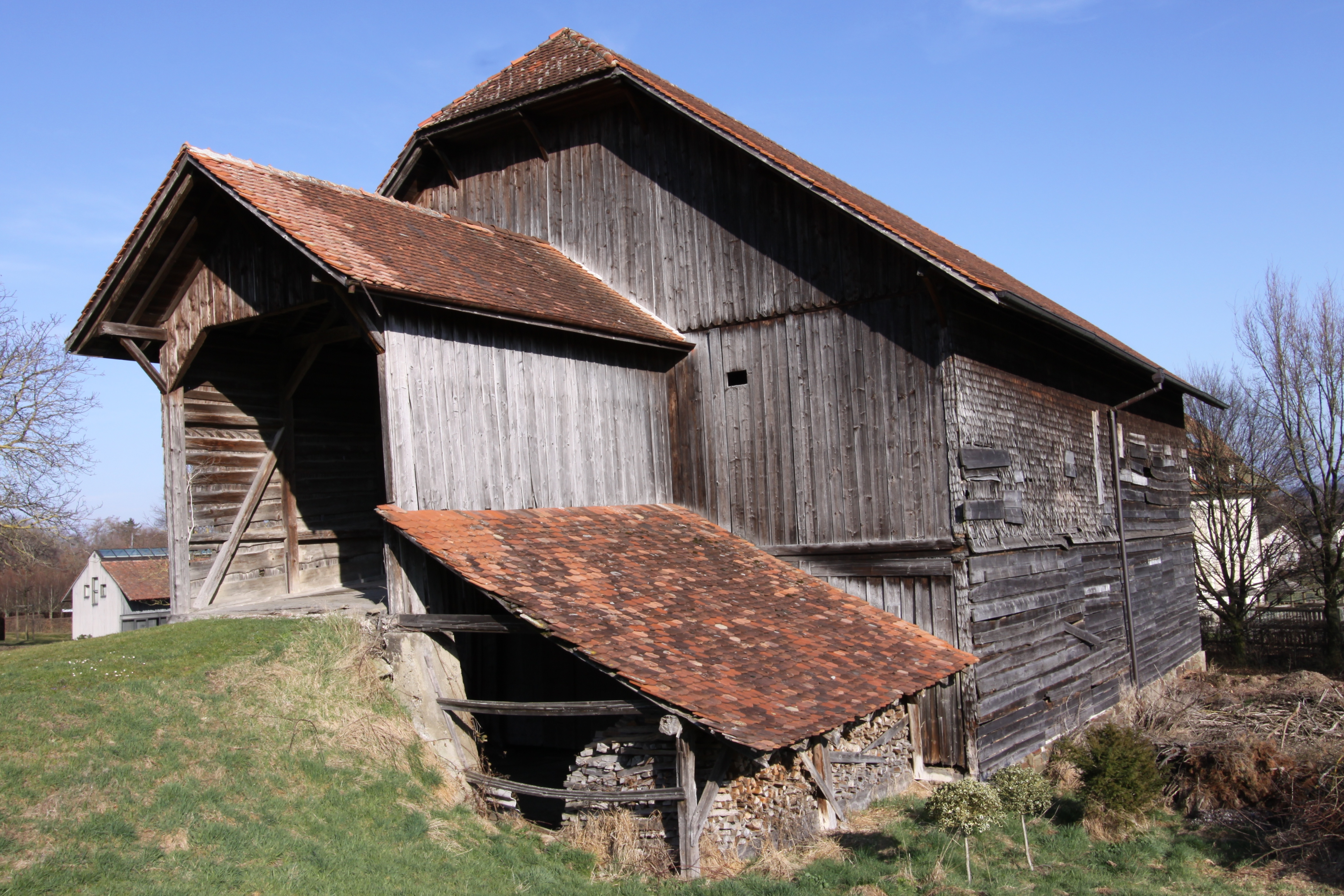
Barn and Stable

== Economy ==
As of 2010, Courtepin had an unemployment rate of 2.8%. As of 2008, there were 15 people employed in the primary economic sector and about 6 businesses involved in this sector. 1,265 people were employed in the secondary sector and there were 12 businesses in this sector. 605 people were employed in the tertiary sector, with 64 businesses in this sector. There were 888 residents of the municipality who were employed in some capacity, of which females made up 41.6% of the workforce.

In 2008 the total number of full-time equivalent jobs was 1,707. The number of jobs in the primary sector was 11, all of which were in agriculture. The number of jobs in the secondary sector was 1,205 of which 1,185 or (98.3%) were in manufacturing and 20 (1.7%) were in construction. The number of jobs in the tertiary sector was 491. In the tertiary sector; 93 or 18.9% were in wholesale or retail sales or the repair of motor vehicles, 16 or 3.3% were in the movement and storage of goods, 24 or 4.9% were in a hotel or restaurant, 16 or 3.3% were the insurance or financial industry, 46 or 9.4% were technical professionals or scientists, 187 or 38.1% were in education and 65 or 13.2% were in health care.

In 2000, there were 1,024 workers who commuted into the municipality and 472 workers who commuted away. The municipality is a net importer of workers, with about 2.2 workers entering the municipality for every one leaving. Of the working population, 13.1% used public transportation to get to work, and 60% used a private car.

== Religion ==
From the 2000 census, 1,170 or 72.0% were Roman Catholic, while 216 or 13.3% belonged to the Swiss Reformed Church. Of the rest of the population, there were 18 members of an Orthodox church (or about 1.11% of the population), and there were 22 individuals (or about 1.35% of the population) who belonged to another Christian church. There were 88 (or about 5.41% of the population) who were Islamic. There was 1 person who was Buddhist, 5 individuals who were Hindu and 1 individual who belonged to another church. 83 (or about 5.10% of the population) belonged to no church, are agnostic or atheist, and 33 individuals (or about 2.03% of the population) did not answer the question.

== Climate ==
Courtepin has an average of 131.4 days of rain or snow per year and on average receives 1,051 mm (41.4 in) of precipitation. The wettest month is August during which time Courtepin receives an average of 116 mm (4.6 in) of rain or snow. During this month there is precipitation for an average of 11.1 days. The month with the most days of precipitation is May, with an average of 13.5, but with only 110 mm (4.3 in) of rain or snow. The driest month of the year is February with an average of 66 mm (2.6 in) of precipitation over 10.8 days.

== Education ==
In Courtepin about 465 or (28.6%) of the population have completed non-mandatory upper secondary education, and 135 or (8.3%) have completed additional higher education (either university or a Fachhochschule). Of the 135 who completed tertiary schooling, 63.0% were Swiss men, 17.8% were Swiss women, 13.3% were non-Swiss men and 5.9% were non-Swiss women.

The Canton of Fribourg school system provides one year of non-obligatory Kindergarten, followed by six years of Primary school. This is followed by three years of obligatory lower Secondary school in which the students are separated according to ability and aptitude. Following the lower Secondary students may attend a three or four-year optional upper Secondary school. The upper Secondary school is divided into collège (university preparatory) and vocational programmes. After they finish the upper Secondary programme, students may choose to attend a Tertiary school or continue their apprenticeship.

During the 2010-11 school year, there were a total of 418 students attending 24 classes in Courtepin. A total of 640 students from the municipality attended any school, either in the municipality or outside of it. There were 4 kindergarten classes with a total of 74 students in the municipality. The municipality had 18 primary classes and 309 students. During the same year, there were no lower secondary classes in the municipality, but 131 students attended lower secondary school in a neighboring municipality. There were 2 upper Secondary classes, with 35 upper Secondary students. The municipality had no non-university Tertiary classes, but there were 3 non-university Tertiary students and 19 specialized Tertiary students who attended classes in another municipality.

As of 2000, there were 135 students in Courtepin who came from another municipality, while 111 residents attended schools outside the municipality.

== Transportation ==
The municipality has two railway stations, Courtepin and Pensier. Both are located on the Fribourg–Ins line and have regular service to Fribourg/Freiburg, Ins, and Neuchâtel.
