= Courtaman =

Village and former municipality in the canton of Fribourg, Switzerland

Coordinates: 46.872°N 7.130°E

Coat of Arms of Courtaman

Courtaman is a village and former municipality in the district of See in the canton of Fribourg, Switzerland.

It was first recorded in 1309 as Cortemant. The municipality is bilingual, with 55% French and 44% German speakers in 2000.

The municipality had 66 inhabitants in 1811, which increased to 129 in 1850, 156 in 1900 and 252 in 1930. It then declined somewhat to 221 in 1950, before skyrocketing to 1054 in 2000.

In 2005 the municipality was incorporated into the larger, neighboring municipality Courtepin.
