= Petit-Vivy Castle =

Castle in Courtepin, Switzerland

- Courtepin
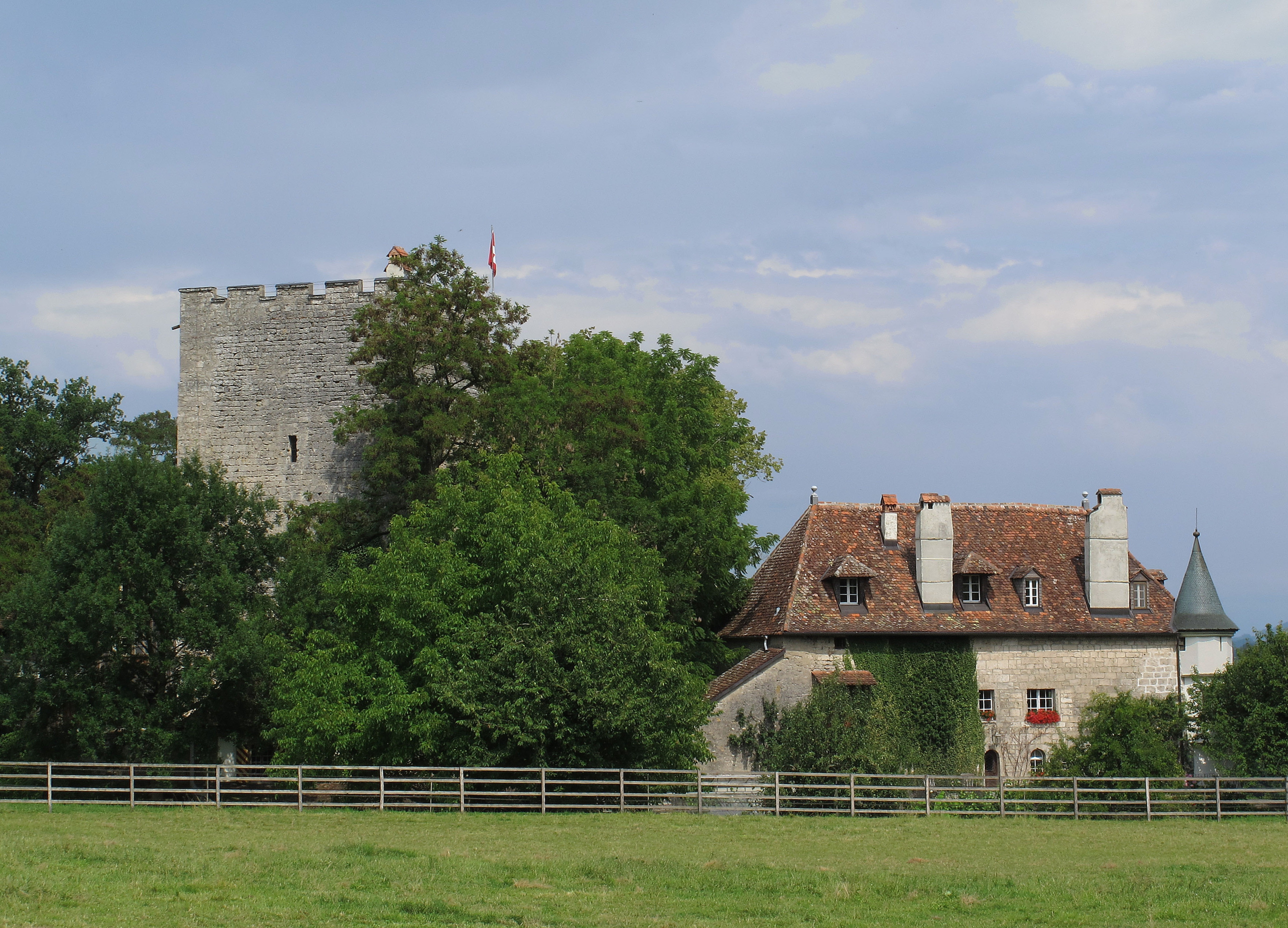
- Petit-Vivy Castle

Site information
- Type: Keep
- Code: CH-FR

Location
- Coordinates: 46°51′57″N 7°10′20″E

Site history
- Built: 13th century

Petit-Vivy Castle is a castle in the former municipality of Barberêche (now part of Courtepin) in the Canton of Fribourg in Switzerland. It is a Swiss Heritage Site of National Significance.

It is located near the dike surrounding the Schiffenensee and northeast of Barberêche. It is among the oldest preserved castles in the region. The still-preserved, mighty, four-sided keep was built in the second half of the 13th century, and has 3.5 m (11 ft) thick walls. Around the keep are the remains of former surrounding walls, arranged in triangular form. The residential buildings were built in the 16th century.

== See also ==
- List of castles and fortresses in Switzerland
