= Friborgês dialect =

Friborgês
- Native to: Switzerland
- Region: Fribourg
- Language family: Indo-European: Italic; Latino-Faliscan; Latin; Romance; Italo-Western; Western Romance; Gallo-Iberian?; Gallo-Romance; Gallo-Rhaetian?; Arpitan–Oïl; Franco-Provençal; Friborgês
- Writing system: Latin

Language codes
- ISO 639-3: None (mis)
- Glottolog: None

Friborgês is a group of Franco-Provençal dialects spoken in the French-speaking part of the canton of Fribourg, Switzerland, especially in the Gruyère region.

The different varieties of Friborgês patois include:

- Gruvérin, spoken in Gruyère and Veveyse;
- The patois of Haute-Glâne;
- Broyard;
- Kouètse, the patois of the plain, especially Sarine-Campagne.

== History ==
=== Origins ===
Like other Romance languages, the dialect originated from Vulgar Latin. It was brought to present-day western Switzerland by merchants and soldiers, gradually displacing the native Celtic languages.

The development of the Franco-Provençal dialect can generally only be traced indirectly through loanwords, the evolution of toponyms, or the influence of the local dialect found in Latin documents. Written sources only appear in the modern era. When the first non-Latin documents and records began to emerge in the 13th century, texts in western Switzerland predominantly adopted Parisian French as their standard language, though they were often heavily influenced by the local dialect.

In contrast, the city of Fribourg was the only municipality in western Switzerland to develop a local written tradition based entirely on Franco-Provençal.

=== Beginnings of the language shift and the 1886 Patois ban ===
The larger Reformed cities in western Switzerland, such as Geneva and Lausanne, increasingly transitioned to using French as their everyday spoken language during the 18th century, and Franco-Provençal completely disappeared in those areas by the early 19th century. In contrast, in the rural areas of the Reformed cantons, as well as in both the countryside and the cities of the cantons of Fribourg and Valais, French was used for writing while Patois continued to be spoken.

By the mid-19th century, the Reformed rural areas and the large Catholic cities, including the city of Fribourg, had also shifted to French. On the plains, Patois was no longer the exclusive everyday language, whereas in the mountainous regions, it remained practically the only spoken language. Historical reports indicate that children in rural areas often barely understood French when they started school, and that in places like the Gruyère region, it was nearly impossible to make oneself understood using French.

During the 19th century, Patois was viewed by many scholars as an obstacle to learning standard French. Many believed that the dialect made it difficult for the people of Fribourg to speak "pure" French. When the poet Louis Bornet published the story Les Tsévreis in the Gruyère Patois in 1841, one of the first literary works in the Fribourgeois Patois, it sparked an intense debate. Bornet was sharply criticized by Hubert Charles, who argued that the Fribourgeois should focus on cultivating proper French instead of using Patois for literature, dismissing the latter as baragouin inintelligible (incomprehensible gibberish). According to Charles, French opened the path to the wider world and modernity, while Patois was merely a harmful influence. Conversely, another writer, Alexandre Daguet, pushed back and even proposed that the French-speaking Swiss should create a common language based on the Patois.

Teachers and school directors held differing opinions on this matter. Some wanted to integrate the Patois into the classroom and use it to help teach students French. For example, in 1821, the priest Grégoire Girard published the Grammaire des campagnes (Grammar of the Countryside), which was built upon the Patois.

Other teachers and inspectors, however, viewed the Patois as harmful and blamed it for poor academic results. A school report from 1862 stated:

„La langue, l’orthographe, la grammaire, la composition, c’est la partie faible de nos écoles […]. L’idiome vulgaire, le patois, est le principal obstacle de nos enfants à parler et à écrire en français. Aussi ne puis-je assez reprocher la mauvaise habitude qui ont certains maîtres de parler patois à leurs enfants, à moins que ce ne soit en passant pour leur donner le sens d’un mot ou l’explication d’une chose qu’ils saisiraient difficilement.“

Language, spelling, grammar, and composition are the weak points of our schools [...]. The vernacular idiom, the Patois, is the main obstacle preventing our children from speaking and writing in French. Thus, I cannot sufficiently criticize the bad habit that certain teachers have of speaking Patois to their children, unless it is just in passing to give them the meaning of a word or the explanation of something they would otherwise have difficulty grasping.

— Report of the school inspector of the Arrondissement of Jogne and Sarine, 1862

Furthermore, a report from the 1878–1879 school year detailed the ongoing struggles:

„A peine un pauvre petit enfant est-il capable d’articuler un son, que sa mère lui apprend avec beaucoup de peine et de patience à bégayer un jargon que j’appellerai barbare et irrationnel dès qu’il ne repose sur aucune base grammaticale. L’enfant ne connais donc que le patois lorsque à l’âge de 6 ou 7 ans, il fait son entrée à l’école il ni a jamais entendu parler d’autre langue. Là pour la première fois il entend sortir de la bouche du maître un langage tout nouveau pour lui. Ce langage qu’il aurait dû apprendre sur les génaux de sa mère il doit l’étudier pour le comprendre. On lui apprend à lire, il fait peu de progrès parce qu’il ne saisit pas la moitié de ce qu’il lit. Le maitre doit s’arrêter à chaque mot lui en demander et expliquer la signification. Enfin les huit années qu’il passe à l’école ne suffisent pas même pour lui apprendre à parler un peu le français.“

Hardly is a poor little child capable of articulating a sound, when his mother teaches him with much effort and patience to stammer a jargon that I would call barbaric and irrational, since it rests on no grammatical basis. The child therefore knows only the Patois when, at the age of 6 or 7, he enters school, having never heard another language spoken. There, for the first time, he hears a completely new language come from the master's mouth. This language, which he should have learned on his mother's lap, he must study in order to understand. He is taught to read, but makes little progress because he does not grasp half of what he reads. The master must stop at every word to ask him and explain its meaning. Ultimately, the eight years he spends in school are not even enough to teach him to speak a little French.

— Rapport sur les Ecoles primaires du 4ieme arrondissement – Année scolaire 1878–79

Towards the end of the 19th century, the state took active measures to suppress the Patois. This suppression is particularly evident in the school regulations of the era, which were thoroughly researched in 2010 by Irma Gadient in her master's thesis ''Patoiseinschränkungsdebatten im Kanton Freiburg (1872–1887)'' (Patois Restriction Debates in the Canton of Fribourg). In the school regulations of 1850, the dialect was still permitted to some extent:

„Art. 147. La langue maternelle (le français ou l’allemand) est seule en usage dans l’école. Le maître cependant pourra, de temps à autre, se servir du patois, comme moyen d’interprétation.“

Art. 147. The mother tongue (French or German) is the only one in use in the school. The master may, however, from time to time, use the patois as a means of translation.

— Article 147 of the School Regulations of 1850

The Patois was therefore still explicitly permitted in the classroom. In 1876, however, the last sentence of this regulation was struck down. In the following years, an intense debate took place, sparked by the poor results of Fribourg recruits in the annual military examinations. The recruits from Fribourg consistently ranked among the worst of the Swiss cantons, and those from the Gruyère and Sense districts performed even worse. According to Irma Gadient, starting in 1882, the Patois served as a sort of "scapegoat" on which inspectors blamed the poor educational results. Prior to this, the arguments had centered more on the inadequate training and poor pay of teachers, the economic hardship of the population, and the lack of proper school buildings.

School inspectors subsequently proposed active measures against the use of Patois. For example, in 1882, school inspector Progin advised teachers to "[...] pursue this cursed patois as far as you possibly can." Some advocated instead for persuasion campaigns by teachers and the press, or for establishing public libraries in rural areas. A smaller group of teachers and inspectors even demanded a cantonal law to ban the Patois, to be enforced in the countryside by gendarmes. Opponents of the Patois primarily argued that dialects were no longer useful for modernity and interregional communication. Furthermore, they claimed Patois was an obstacle to the acquisition of French and, consequently, to general education. Even those who did not want to take active measures against the Patois considered its extinction to be inevitable and a positive development. However, there were also dissenting voices who advocated for bilingualism, seeing no negative influence from the Patois and instead recognizing it as important for identity and tradition.

Furthermore, educational authorities likely assumed that the Patois-speaking rural population would resist restrictions on the dialect, viewing them as an interference in family matters. Because of this, efforts were made to persuade the population voluntarily. Inspector Progin, for instance, published a newspaper article in 1884 urging mothers to speak French with their children. He argued that there would still be enough time for children after school age "to acquire the perfect use of the patois, which will not disappear, and whose merits everyone recognizes."

Finally, in 1886, the use of Patois was strictly prohibited in schools across the canton of Fribourg. The school regulations were amended so that the dialect was no longer permitted, not even as a colloquial language among the students:

Art 171. The use of patois is strictly forbidden in schools. The French language and grammatical German alone are admitted in teaching [...] Teachers shall ensure that the same applies outside school and in conversations between children. — Article 171 of the School Regulations of 1886

According to Irma Gadient, the ban on the Patois in schools primarily reflects the negative attitude towards dialects in western Switzerland. The devaluation of Patois as "inferior" had a long tradition in western Switzerland, and it was primarily this negative attitude toward the dialects that caused the decline of the language. The "Patois ban" in the school regulations was more a symptom of this attitude, rather than the sole reason for the disappearance of the Patois. Interestingly, this same language ideology was also applied to the Swiss German dialects, which were simultaneously banned by the exact same regulation.

The arguments of both supporters and opponents of the Patois in these debates were often quite contradictory. On the one hand, many people generally devalued the Patois as rough, or, as some teachers from the Broye district described it in 1884, as "pas une langue, ni même un dialecte" (not a language, not even a dialect). On the other hand, even the fiercest advocates of the Patois ban often described the language as expressive, beautiful, and an important component of Fribourg's identity, traditions, and past.

School inspector Progin, who played a decisive role in the creation of the Patois ban, stated in a speech at the time that the Gruyère Patois contained "les formes les plus harmonieuses et les plus riches tournures" (the most harmonious forms and the richest turns of phrase), while in the very same sentence noting with satisfaction that French was increasingly being spoken in families.

At the same time, even supporters of the Patois often viewed its eventual disappearance as a sign of progress, even if they preferred to let it die out naturally over time. For example, Cyprien Ruffieux, himself one of the most famous Patois poets, referred to the Patois as a "national language" in 1894, yet simultaneously advocated for its eradication:

„Le patois qui est, pour ainsi dire, notre langue maternelle et nationale tout aussi bien que le français, est un obstacle sérieux à l’avancement de nos élèves, tant dans le langage écrit que dans le langage parlé. C’est l’ennemi qu’il faut vaincre à tout prix."

The patois, which is, so to speak, our mother and national tongue just as much as French, is a serious obstacle to the advancement of our students, both in written and spoken language. It is the enemy that must be vanquished at all costs.

— Cyprien Ruffieux, 1894

In his 1891 study on the German-French language border in Switzerland, Jakob Zimmerli also made numerous observations regarding the status of the Romand Patois. Because Zimmerli only mentioned the towns along the language border, and omitted any mention of Patois for many of them, his account does not provide a complete picture. He said nothing about the Broye and Glâne districts, but covered almost all the municipalities in the See district, and a large part of the Sarine and Gruyère districts. In almost all these localities, Zimmerli noted that Patois was still the vernacular, as well as the language of the youth and children.

According to Zimmerli, at most a few families in any given town spoke French on occasion. The dialect remained remarkably dominant in the Gruyère region, where even immigrants arriving from German-speaking Switzerland or Prussia spoke Patois with the local children. Similarly, in the German-speaking municipality of Jaun in the Gruyère district, Patois was "more or less familiar to most people."

The situation was different in the See district, where a sharp linguistic and generational divide emerged by the end of the 19th century. In the streets of Murten, for instance, children already spoke French while adults still used Patois almost exclusively. In Barberêche, it was no longer the language of the youth, nor was it in Bas-Vully, while Haut-Vully was already predominantly French-speaking.

In other parts of the See District, the Patois was instead under pressure from German: in Courgevaux, Patois was still the language of adults, but the children spoke German with one another, and in Courlevon, only a few elderly people still spoke it, while the rest spoke German. A few other municipalities had also likely shifted to German over the preceding century, such as Galmiz, Wallenbuch and Salvenach.

=== Development in the 20th century ===
In the first half of the 20th century, the language shift to French began taking hold in the remaining rural areas as well. In 1932, Jean Risse wrote that the Patois was already rare in the Broye district, and that people were often ashamed of their dialect. In the mountainous regions, however, the Patois remained vibrant:

„[…] le paysan, bien loin de demeurer attaché à son patois, le considère comme un langage d’ordre inférieur […] dont il a plus ou moins honte. On a l’impression que parler patois comporte quelque chose de grossier, signifie un état d’infériorité, une absence de culture, un retard dans la civilisation et le progrès du jour. Ce sentiment est particulierement vif chez les jeunes gens et surtout les jeunes femmes. […] nos villages alpestres […] manifestent encore, et il faut les en féliciter, une certaine fierté robuste à garder le patois. Ils y voient un symbole-16 de leur indépendance à l’égard de ce qui a le caractère officiel et obligatoire, et de la liberté du montagnard de parler à sa guise."

...the peasant, far from remaining attached to his patois, considers it a language of a lower order [...] of which he is more or less ashamed. One gets the impression that speaking patois entails something coarse, signifies a state of inferiority, a lack of culture, a backwardness in civilization and the progress of the day. This feeling is particularly strong among young people, and especially young women. [...] our alpine villages [...] still show, and they must be congratulated for it, a certain robust pride in keeping the patois. They see in it a symbol of their independence from that which has an official and obligatory character, and of the mountaineer's freedom to speak as he pleases.

— Jean Risse, La langue paysanne, 1932

At the same time, a literary renaissance took place, and a multitude of books, stories, poems, songs, and plays were written in Patois. The fight against the Patois continued, although some people advocated for the promotion of the dialects. For instance, in 1929, Henri Naef and Louis Sudan debated the issue in the journal Annales Fribourgeoises. Members of the Société d'Histoire had expressed the opinion that Patois was only important as a field of research for scholars, but was disappearing as a vernacular language and had no future. Naef subsequently published an article arguing that while the Patois was indeed retreating, it was still possible to support it, just as was being done with the Romansh language.

Naef also highlighted the many books, theatrical performances, and songs that had been written in recent years and were highly appreciated by the common people, noting: "the rural crowds, whom I believe I have never seen so happy [...] the Gruyère dialect [...] is currently in full bloom."

In response, Louis Sudan wrote that the Patois had already been marginalized far too much. He argued it was under insurmountable pressure from the press, schools, and economic changes, and would inevitably disappear. Furthermore, he claimed the use of Patois could only hinder the correct use of French. According to Sudan, the Patois should therefore be left to folklorists to study, and no "vain resistance" should be offered against these "invading floods."

Henri Naef also demanded that Patois be taught in schools instead of being suppressed there. This was apparently not an isolated opinion in the 1920s and 1930s. For example, in his 1932 book La langue paysanne, Jean Risse noted that "certain loyal friends of our dialect" wished that children in primary school would learn to read Patois. However, Risse himself considered this unreasonable and a proposal with no chance of success. He argued that parents would likely view such an endeavor as a waste of time, and "would probably turn red with anger upon seeing, in their toddlers' schoolbags, the otherwise delightful works called Dou vilyo et dou novi and Ouna fourdêrao dê j’êlyudzo."

From the 1930s onwards, the Patois dialects were increasingly viewed as an enrichment to Switzerland and a mediator of Swiss identity. The earlier argument that Patois, as a spoken mother tongue, would corrupt French was now reversed. During this time, many people instead saw French as a corrupting carrier of modernity, and the Patois as the language of the Romands' rural roots. For example, in 1942, the Fribourg poet Gonzague de Reynold viewed the Gruyère Patois as the essence of the spirit and soul of Romandy, and regretted that the other cantons had severed themselves from this root. However, by this time, the language shift had already fully taken hold in the mountainous Gruyère region, so the Patois was simply no longer perceived as a threat.

In Cerniat in the Gruyère district, for example, diglossia remained stable until about 1930. French was used in writing, at school, and in church, while Patois was spoken in everyday life. It was only in the 1930s that parents increasingly spoke French with their children, and from the 1940s onwards, practically no parents spoke Patois with their children anymore. From the 1940s, young people also spoke almost exclusively French among themselves, even though most still learned Patois anyway because the language was still very present in the community, or because other family members continued to speak Patois with the children.

In the second half of the 20th century, various associations were founded with the explicit goal of preserving the Patois. These included the Conseil romand des patoisants in 1955, the Fédération romande des patoisants in 1960, and the La Chochiétâ di j’êmi dou paté fribordzè in the Canton of Fribourg, followed by other regional associations such as the Patêjan de la Grevire in the Gruyère region in 1984.

In 1961, the 1886 "Patois ban" was finally lifted. Grand Councilor Joseph Brodard had campaigned for this change, and from then on, the school regulations officially stated: "Le patois ne constitue pas un obstacle à l’enseignement du français" (The patois does not constitute an obstacle to the teaching of French).

The language shift continued regardless. In Cerniat, for example, the generation that grew up in the 1950s and later still had enough Patois around them that they mostly understood the language and could sometimes still speak it. However, since the 1980s, this generational transmission has practically ceased, and the vast majority of children and young people speak very little or no Patois at all. By contrast, in the highest settled part of the municipality of Cerniat, the village of La Valsainte, the Patois remained the general family and colloquial language until the 1950s, and isolated cases of children there continued to grow up with the Patois until the 1980s.

The 1967 Atlas of Switzerland also provided data showing for which age groups of men the Patois remained the colloquial language. In the Canton of Fribourg, the Patois was already extinct at that time in the vicinity of the city of Fribourg, a few municipalities in the See District, about half of the Broye district, and a few municipalities in Glâne. In the majority of the rest of Broye, and in various municipalities in the other districts, as well as in the area around Bulle, the Patois was only rarely spoken by men over 50 or 70. The strongholds of the Patois were still the majority of the Gruyère region (except the area around Bulle) and the Upper Sarine and Upper Glâne, where the Patois was in some cases still spoken by young people. The rest of the canton lay between these two extremes; in most municipalities, the Patois was the normal colloquial language only for men over 50.

=== Current distribution ===
Compared to the rest of Romandy, Franco-Provençal in the Canton of Fribourg is less well preserved than in Valais, but it is significantly better preserved than in the Reformed cantons, where it has been extinct for several generations. The Fribourgeois Patois remains alive particularly in the Gruyère district, where it is still sometimes used as a colloquial language within families.

The exact number of Fribourgeois Patois speakers can only be estimated. In the 1990 Swiss census, 4,653 people in the Canton of Fribourg indicated that they spoke "Patois Romand" in everyday life, representing 3.91% of the population in the francophone part of the canton. By the 2000 census, this number had fallen to 3,310 people. In 2000, the highest proportion of speakers was in the Gruyère district at 4.23% (down from 7.24% in 1990), followed by the Glâne district at 2.54% (1990: 3.6%), the Veveyse district at 1.32% (1990: 2.33%), and the Sarine district at 1.04% (1990: 1.5%). In the Broye and See districts, the number was under one percent. At the municipal level in 2000, five municipalities still had at least 10% of their population reporting regular Patois use: Le Châtelard (15.4%), Cerniat (15.1%), La Roche (13.4%), Sorens (11.6%), and Villarbeney (11.4%). By comparison, in 1990, four municipalities had over 20% and seven more had over 10%. With the exceptions of Le Châtelard and Treyvaux, all of these municipalities are located in the Gruyère district.

These census figures must be interpreted cautiously. Many people in Romandy do not have a clear definition of the word "Patois," and it is likely that many who only speak a regional variety of French checked the "Patois" box. In the new census format introduced in 2010, the term "Patois romand" was removed entirely, meaning no newer official data is available.

Otherwise, there are few modern studies on the current use of Fribourgeois Patois. In a survey conducted by linguist Manuel Meune between 2004 and 2007, about a fifth of respondents in the Canton of Fribourg stated they understood the Patois fluently or very well, and 8.6% indicated they spoke it fluently or very well. Only about half of the respondents said they did not understand the Patois at all. However, Meune noted that these figures cannot be broadly applied to the entire canton or the entire rural population.

A 2011 master's thesis by Clemens Kienzle examined the current use of Patois in the Gruyère municipality of Cerniat. There, about a quarter of the inhabitants were competent Patois speakers, about half had lower competencies, and the remainder knew only a few words or phrases, or no Patois at all. Roughly half of the residents of Cerniat reported understanding the Patois without difficulty, while a quarter understood the main points of a conversation, and another quarter understood only the most frequent words. The small minority who understood no Patois at all were entirely people who had moved there from outside the Gruyère region. Most speakers in this study were born between 1930 and 1950, though there were a few younger speakers.

Among those who still speak Patois, the language is primarily used in family settings, within friend circles, or symbolically to show belonging and closeness. Children and young people often come into contact with the Patois through the grandparent generation.

Even though Franco-Provençal only plays a role in everyday life for a small portion of Fribourgeois today, many traces of it remain. Certain words are still heavily used in the local French, such as the word dzodzet. This is the Patois form of the name 'Joseph' and was originally an unfriendly nickname used by other Romands to describe the Fribourgeois. Today, it has been reclaimed and is used affectionately by the Fribourgeois themselves, such as in the "Original Dzodzet" competition regularly organized by the Cardinal Brewery.

The Patois is also still very present in field names and toponyms, as not all names were entirely Gallicized. During municipal mergers in the Gruyère region, for instance, the new municipalities of Bas-Intyamon and Haut-Intyamon adopted the Patois name of the valley, Intyamon ('between the mountains'). Other surviving words are frequently related to traditional alpine farming. Terms for the ascent and descent of alpine pastures, la poya and la rinda (or rindyà), are widely used in local French. The traditional Gruyère costume is also referred to by its Patois names: the bredzon for men and the dzaquillon for women.

Furthermore, Patois songs remain in the repertoires of many choirs today, even if they are no longer understood by everyone singing them. Such songs are viewed by many Fribourgeois, especially in Gruyère, as an important component of their identity and culture. Apart from choirs, Patois is frequently kept alive by theater groups, which have a long tradition in the canton.

Since around the year 2000, Patois courses have been offered regularly in the canton. For example, it is offered as an elective subject at the secondary school in Bulle. Additionally, courses for adults are regularly offered through the Fribourg Adult Education Center (Volkshochschule) and the Migros Club School.

== Writers ==
Notable writers and figures associated with Friborgês patois include:

- Max Bielmann, parish priest of Crésuz;
- François-Xavier Brodard, known as Jévié, parish priest of La Roche (1903–1978);
- Joseph Bovet, music teacher and composer (1879–1951);
- Anne-Marie Yerly (born 1936);
- Cyprien Ruffieux, known as “Tobi di j'élyudzo”, poet (1859–1940);
- Léon L'Homme;
- Francis Brodard;
- Joseph Toffel, writer of comedies, plays and songs in patois (1918–1996).

== Orthography ==
The following table gives common letters and sounds used in Friborgês orthography.

Letter	Pronunciation	Example	French	English
p	[p]	portâ	apporter	to bring
b	[b]	bêre	boire	to drink
t	[t]	la grandzèta – ‚la grange‘	la grange	the barn
d	[d]	demindze	dimanche	Sunday
k	[k]	l‘ekoula	l'école	the school
g	[ɡ]	la gajèta	le journal	the newspaper
m	[m]	l‘omo	l'homme	the man
n	[n]	kemouna	commune	commune
ny	[ɲ]	la montanye	la montagne	the mountain
f	[f]	forèthê	forestier	forester
v	[v]	vayà	valeur	value
th	[θ], [x]	le lathi	le lait	the milk
s	[s]	Supyêra	Surpierre	Surpierre (Municipality in the Broye district.)
z	[z]	Promazin	Promasens	Promasens (Locality in Glâne)
ch	[ʃ]	la chèrpin	le serpent	the snake
j	[ʒ]	pèjan	lourd	heavy
hy	[ç]	la hyà	la crème	the cream
h	[h]	ha dzà	la forêt	the forest
r	[r], [ʁ], ou [ɹ]	fére	faire	to do; to make
l	[l]	la lê	la loi	the law
y	[j]	la famiye	la famille	the family
ly	[ʎ]	la filye	la fille	the girl
ts	[ts]	le tsan	le chant	the song
dz	[dz]	dzouno	jeune	young
tch, ty	[tʃ]	la tchivra	la chèvre	the goat
dj, dy	[dʒ]	le bolondyi	le boulanger	the baker
i	[i]	diridji	diriger	to direct
u	[y]	le pu	le coq	the rooster
ou	[u]	le bou	le bois	wood
é	[e]	la né	la nuit	the night
eu	[ø]	moncheu	monsieur	sir
ô	[o]	la chô	le sel	salt
è	[ɛ]	la fèna	la femme	the woman
o	[ɔ]	le bochè	le tonneau	the barrel
e	[ə]	delon	lundi	Monday
ê	[æ]	la chê	la haie	the hedge
a	[a]	la vatse	la vache	the cow
à	[ɑ]	le bà	le bœuf	the ox
â	[ɒ]	demâ	mardi	Tuesday
in	[ə̃]	kontin	content	happy
on	[ɔ̃]	la méjon	la maison	the house
an	[ɑ̃]	le pan	le pain	the bread

== Grammar ==
=== Nouns ===
Friborgês patois has two grammatical genders: masculine and feminine. Each gender has both a definite and an indefinite article. Unlike in French, the gender of a noun is partly indicated by its ending. Nouns ending in -o are always masculine, while words ending in -a are feminine. The masculine definite article is ''le'' or ''l’'':

- ''le buro'' — “the butter”
- ''l’êmi'' — “the friend”

The feminine definite article is ''la'' or ''l’'':

- ''la dona'' — “the mother”
- ''l’àra'' — “the hour”

The masculine indefinite article is ''on'':

- ''on bouébo'' — “a boy”

The feminine indefinite article is ''ouna'' or ''oun’'':

- ''ouna fiye'' — “a girl”
- oun’oroye — “an ear”

Friborgês partitive articles are ''dou'' for masculine nouns beginning with a consonant and ''dè l’'' before a vowel:

- ''dou buro'' — “some butter”
- ''dè l’ivouè'' — “some water”

The feminine partitive article is, as in French, always ''de la'':

- ''de la farna'' — “some flour”

The plural partitive article is always ''di'', equivalent to French ''des'':

- 'di pomè — “some apples”

The gender of words in Friborgês patois is usually the same as the gender of the equivalent French words. There are, however, exceptions, such as la demindze but French le dimanche, la chô but French le sel, le pre but French la poire, and le rèlodzo but French la pendule.

It is possible to change the gender of a noun by adding or modifying a suffix, as in le pudzin, “the male chick”, and la pudzèna, “the female chick”; le bolondji, “the baker”, and la bolondjire, “the female baker”; or le payijan, “the peasant”, and la payijanna, “the peasant woman”. Some nouns, however, change completely when passing from one gender to the other: le pu, “the rooster”, but la dzeniye, “the hen”; le bà, “the ox”, but la vatse, “the cow”; and on tsavô, “a horse”, but oun’èga, “a mare”.

The plural definite article is ''lè'', while the plural indefinite article is ''di''. These articles are the same for masculine and feminine nouns. In the masculine, the ending of nouns usually remains the same in the singular and plural:

- ''l’omo'' — “the man” → ''lè j’omo'' — “the men”

In the feminine, the plural ending sometimes takes the suffix ''-è'':

- la vatse — “the cow” → lè vatsè — “the cows”

=== Adjectives ===
In Friborgês patois, the adjective agrees in gender and number with the noun. In the masculine singular, the adjective generally ends in -o, while in the feminine it generally ends in -a:

- ''lordo'' → ''lorda'' — “heavy”
- ''dzouno'' → ''dzouna'' — “young”
- ''pouro'' → ''poura'' — “poor”

However, some adjectives ending in ''-o'' in the masculine end in ''-e'' in the feminine:

- ''lârdzo'' → ''lârdze'' — “wide”
- ''châdzo'' → ''châdze'' — “wise”
- ''krouyo'' → ''krouye'' — “bad”

Masculine adjectives ending in ''-à'' have a feminine ending in ''-àja'':

- ''travayà'' → ''travayàja'' — “hard-working”
- ''orgoyà'' → ''orgoyàja'' — “proud”

In the plural, masculine adjectives generally keep the same ending as in the singular:

- ''on galé bri'' — “a pretty cradle” → ''di galé bri'' — “pretty cradles”
- ''on pre malê'' — “a sour pear” → ''di pre malê'' — “sour pears”

In the plural, feminine adjectives generally end in ''-è'':

- ''ouna roba byantse'' — “a white dress” → ''di robè byantsè'' — “white dresses”
- ''la vatse nêre'' — “the black cow” → ''lè vatsè nêrè'' — “the black cows”

=== Pronouns ===
Friborgês personal pronouns vary according to person and function. The following table gives the main subject, object, indirect object, reflexive and demonstrative forms.

Person	Subject	Direct object	Indirect object	Reflexive	Demonstrative
1st sg.	i	mè			
2nd sg.	te	tè			
3rd sg.	i	le (masc.) la (fem.)	li	chè	li (masc.) i (fem.)
1st pl.	no				
2nd pl.	vo				
3rd pl.	i	lè	lou	chè	là

When a pronoun is the subject of the sentence, that is, in the nominative, it may be omitted, as in Italian or Spanish. For example:

- ''Iro dzounèta.'' — “I will be a young woman.”
- ''Mè dèvejâvè to doulon in patê.'' — “He spoke to me in patois throughout.”

=== Possessive adjectives and pronouns ===
The following table gives the possessive adjectives in Friborgês patois:

			Possessed object		
			Singular		Plural
			Masculine	Feminine	Plural
Possessor	1st Person	Singular	mon	ma	mè
Possessor	1st Person	Plural	nouthron	nouthra	nouthrè
Possessor	2nd Person	Singular	ton	ta	tè
Possessor	2nd Person	Plural	vouthron	vouthra	vouthrè
Possessor	3rd Person	Singular	chon	cha	chè
Possessor	3rd Person	Plural	lou		

As in French, the appropriate possessive adjective is chosen according to the number and gender of the noun with which it is associated:

- ''mon frârè'' — “my brother” → ''ma chèra'' — “my sister” → ''mè parin'' — “my parents”
- ''chon frârè'' — “his brother” → ''cha chèra'' — “his sister” → ''chè parin'' — “his/her parents”

The following table gives the possessive pronouns:

			Possessed object			
			Singular		Plural	
			Masculine	Feminine	Masculine	Feminine
Possessor	1st Person	Singular	le myo	la mâye	lè myo	lè mâyè
Possessor	1st Person	Plural	le nouthro	la nouthra	lè nouthro	lè nouthrè
Possessor	2nd Person	Singular	le tyo	la tuva	lè tyo	lè tuvè
Possessor	2nd Person	Plural	le vouthro	la vouthra	lè vouthro	lè vouthrè
Possessor	3rd Person	Singular	le chyo	la chuva	lè chyo	lè chuvè
Possessor	3rd Person	Plural	le là	la là	lè là	

=== Demonstratives ===
In Friborgês patois, each noun may be preceded by two demonstrative adjectives: a normal form and a stressed form.

	Singular	Stressed singular	Plural	Stressed plural
Masculine	chi	chti	hou	chtou
Feminine	ha	chta	hou	chtou

Examples:

- ''chi lêvro'' — “this book”
- ''chti lêvro'' — “this very book” or “this/that book here”

When the noun following a demonstrative adjective begins with a vowel, liaison is made either by adding l or j before the noun, or by eliding the final vowel of the demonstrative adjective:

- ''chi lêvro'' — “this book”
- ''chi l’omo'' — “this man”
- ''ha tchivra'' — “this goat”
- ''h’inyema'' — “this anvil”
- ''hou vatsè'' — “these cows”
- ''hou j’omo'' — “these men”

Unlike demonstrative adjectives, demonstrative pronouns replace a noun. The demonstrative pronoun differs according to whether the object it replaces is indefinite, nearby, far away, or held by the speaker.

	Indefinite	The object is nearby	The object is far away	The object is held by the speaker
Masculine	chin	chi-inke	chi-lé	chtiche
Feminine	choche	ha-inke	ha-lé	chtache
Plural	chin-lé	hou-inke	hou-lé	chtàche

=== Verbs ===
Regular verbs in Friborgês patois are divided into four groups:

1st group end in -â, as in dèvejâ — “to talk; to discuss”, or in -i, as in medji — “to eat”. Almost all words in this category originate from Latin verbs ending in -ARE;

2nd group end in -i, as in vinyi — “to come”, or dremi — “to sleep”. These verbs often come from Latin verbs ending in -IRE, or sometimes in -ĒRE;

3rd group end in -êre, as in bêre — “to drink”, or -ê, as in povê — “to be able”. These verbs often originate from Latin verbs ending in -ĒRE;

4th group end in -re, as in prindre — “to take”.

The present participle is formed by placing in before the verb and modifying the ending with the suffix -in.

Present participle of verbs from each group
'dèvejâ'' “to talk; to discuss”	'medji'' “to eat”	'vinyi'' “to come”	''dremi'' “to sleep”	''bêre'' “to drink”	''povê'' “to be able”	''prindre'' “to take”
in dèvejin	in medzin	in vinyin	in dremechin	in bèvechin	in puyin	in prinyin

Example:

- ''L’ivouè ch’in va in èpoufin.'' — “The water disappears while boiling.”

The following table gives the present simple conjugation of selected verbs:

Présent simple des verbes de chaque groupe
	''ithre'' “to be”	''avê'' “to have”	'dèvejâ'' “to talk; to discuss”	'medji'' “to eat”	'vinyi'' “to come”	''dremi'' “to sleep”	''bêre'' “to drink”	''povê'' “to be able”	''prindre'' “to take”
1st person singular	(i) chu	(i) l’é	(i) dèvejo	(i) medzo	(i) vinyo	(i) douârmo	(i) bêvo	(i) pu	(i) prinnyo
2nd person singular	t’i	t’â	te dèvejè	te medzè	te vin	te douâ	te bê	te pà	te prin
3rd person singular	(i) l’è	(i) l’a	(i) dèvejè	(i) medzè	(i) vin	(i) douâ	(i) bê	(i) pà	(i) prin
1st person plural	no chin	no j’an	no dèvejin	no medzin	no vinyin	no douârmin	no bêvin	no puyin	no prinnyin
2nd person plural	vo j’ithè	vo j’ê	vo dèvejâdè	vo medjidè	vo vinyidè	vo dremidè	vo bêdè	vo pouédè	vo prindè
3rd person plural	(i) chon	(i) l’an	(i) dèvejon	(i) medzon	(i) vinyon	(i) douârmon	(i) bêvon	(i) puyon	(i) prinnyon

The imperative is formed as in French: the verb is used in its present-tense form, but the personal pronoun is omitted.

- ''vin!'' — “come!”
- ''rèdzoyè-tè!'' — “rejoice!”
- ''medzin!'' — “eat!”
- ''bêvin!'' — “drink!”

Some verbs express the imperative through particular turns of phrase:

- ''tè fô ithre châdzo!'' — “you must be wise!”
- ''tè fô chavê!'' — “you must know!”

The following table gives the imperfect conjugation of selected verbs:

Imparfait des verbes de chaque groupe
	''ithre'' “to be” (1)	''ithre'' “to be” (2)	''avê'' “to have”	'dèvejâ'' “to talk; to discuss”	'medji'' “to eat”	'vinyi'' “to come”	''dremi'' “to sleep”	''bêre'' “to drink”	''povê'' “to be able”	''prindre'' “to take”
1st person singular	iro	èthé	(i) l’avé	(i) dèvejâvo	(i) medjivo	(i) vinyé	(i) dremeché	(i) bèveché	(i) pové	(i) prenyé
2nd person singular	t’irè	t’èthé	t’avé	te dèvejâvè	te medjivè	te vinyé	te dremeché	te bèveché	te pové	te prenyé
3rd person singular	irè	èthê	(i) l’avê	(i) dèvejâvè	(i) medjivè	(i) vinyê	(i) dremechê	(i) bèvechê	(i) povê	(i) prenyê
1st person plural	no j’iran	no j’èthan	no j’avan	no dèvejâvan	no medjivan	no vinyan	no dremechan	no bèvechan	no povan	no prenyan
2nd person plural	vo j’irâ	vo j’èthâ	vo j’avâ	vo dèvejâvâ	vo medjivâ	vo vinyâ	vo dremechâ	vo bèvechâ	vo povâ	vo prenyâ
3rd person plural	iran	èthan	(i) l’avan	(i) dèvejâvan	(i) medjivan	(i) vinyan	(i) dremechan	(i) bèvechan	(i) povan	(i) prenyan

The following table gives the future-tense conjugation of selected verbs:

Future tense of verbs from each group
	''ithre'' “to be”	''avê'' “to have”	'dèvejâ'' “to talk; to discuss”	'medji'' “to eat”	'vinyi'' “to come”	''dremi'' “to sleep”	''bêre'' “to drink”	''povê'' “to be able”	''prindre'' “to take”
1st person singular	(i) cheri	(i) l’ari	(i) dèvejèri	(i) medzèri	(i) vindri	(i) dremethri	(i) bèvethri	(i) pori	(i) prindri
2nd person singular	te cheri	t’ari	te dèvejèri	te medzèri	te vindri	te dremethri	te bèvethri	te pori	te prindri
3rd person singular	(i) cherè	(i) l’arè	(i) dèvejèrè	(i) medzèrè	(i) vindrè	(i) dremethrè	(i) bèvethrè	(i) porè	(i) prindrè
1st person plural	no cherin	no j’arin	no dèvejèrin	no medzèrin	no vindrin	no dremethrin	no bèvethrin	no porin	no prindrin
2nd person plural	vo cheri	vo j’ari	vo dèvejèri	vo medzèri	vo vindri	vo dremethri	vo bèvethri	vo pori	vo prindri
3rd person plural	(i) cheron	(i) l’aron	(i) dèvejèron	(i) medzèron	(i) vindron	(i) dremethron	(i) bèvethron	(i) poron	(i) prindron

The following table gives the present subjunctive conjugation of selected verbs:

Present subjunctive of verbs from each group
	''ithre'' “to be”	''avê'' “to have”	'dèvejâ'' “to talk; to discuss”	'medji'' “to eat”	'vinyi'' “to come”	''dremi'' “to sleep”	''bêre'' “to drink”	''povê'' “to be able”	''prindre'' “to take”
1st person singular	ke chêyo	k’ôcho	ke dèvejicho	ke medjicho	ke venyicho	ke dremicho	ke bèvechicho	ke puécho	ke prenyicho
2nd person singular	ke te chêyè	ke t’ôchè	ke te dèvejichè	ke te medjichè	ke te venyichè	ke te dremichè	ke te bèvechichè	ke te puéchè	ke te prenyichè
3rd person singular	ke chêyè	k’ôchè	ke dèvejichè	ke medjichè	ke venyichè	ke dremichè	ke bèvechichè	ke puéchè	ke prenyichè
1st person plural	ke no chêyan	ke no j’ôchan	ke no dèvejichan	ke no medjichan	ke no venyichan	ke no dremichan	ke no bèvechichan	ke no puéchan	ke no prenyichan
2nd person plural	ke vo chêyâ	ke vo j’ôchâ	ke vo dèvejichâ	ke no medjichan	ke vo venyichâ	ke vo dremichâ	ke vo bèvechichâ	ke vo puéchâ	ke vo prenyichâ
3rd person plural	ke chêyon	k’ôchan	ke dèvejichan	ke medjichan	ke venyichan	ke dremichan	ke bèvechichan	ke puéchan	ke prenyichan

=== Numeral system ===
Unlike the French of France, but like the French of French-speaking Switzerland, the numeral system of Friborgês patois does not use the vigesimal system and instead uses only the decimal system. As in French, numbers below seventeen are irregular.

0	1	2	3	4	5	6	7	8	9
zérô	on	dou	trè	katro	thin	chê	chate	ouète	nà
10	11	12	13	14	15	16	17	18	19
dji	ondzè	dodzè	trèdzè	katoârdzè	tyindzè	chèdzè	dji-j‘è chate	dji-j‘è ouète	dji-j‘è nà
20	21	22	23	24	25	26	27	28	29
vin	vinty‘on	vint‘è dou	vint‘è trè	vint‘è katro	vint‘è thin	vint‘è chê	vint‘è chate	vint‘è ouète	vint‘è nà
30	31	32	33	...					
trinta	trint‘yon	trint‘è dou	trint‘è trè	...					
40	41	42	43	...					
karanta	karant‘yon	karant‘è dou	karant‘è trè	...					
50	51	52	53	...					
thinkanta	thinkant‘yon	thinkant‘è dou	thinkant‘è trè	...					
60	61	62	63	...					
chuchanta	chuchant‘yon	chuchant‘è dou	chuchant‘è trè	...					
70	71	72	73	...					
chaptanta	chaptant‘yon	chaptant‘è dou	chaptant‘è trè	...					
80	81	82	83	...					
ouètanta	ouètant‘yon	ouètant‘è dou	ouètant‘è trè	...					
90	91	92	93	...					
nonanta	nonant‘yon	nonant‘è dou	nonant‘è trè	...					
100	101	102	103	...					
than	than‘yon	than‘è dou	than‘è trè	...,					

== Associations ==
The Société des patoisans de la Gruyère, founded in 1984, aims to maintain knowledge and use of Gruvérin patois. It has notably published a patois–French dictionary and organised conversation courses.

In 2007, for the centenary of Hergé's birth, the association's president Joseph Comba translated the Tintin comic The Calculus Affair into Friborgês patois under the title L'Afére Tournesol. In this version, the detectives Thomson and Thompson became Remy, a common surname in Gruyère, and Remi, Hergé's real name.

In 2017, The Little Prince by Antoine de Saint-Exupéry was translated into patois under the title Le Piti Prinhyo. The translation, carried out under the initiative of the Société cantonale des patoisants fribourgeois with the participation of Joseph Comba, took four months and was first presented at the Comptoir Gruérien. The print run was 2,500 copies.

The Société cantonale des patoisants fribourgeois has also launched a French–patois dictionary as a free application for smartphones and tablets.
