= Barberêche =

- Former municipality
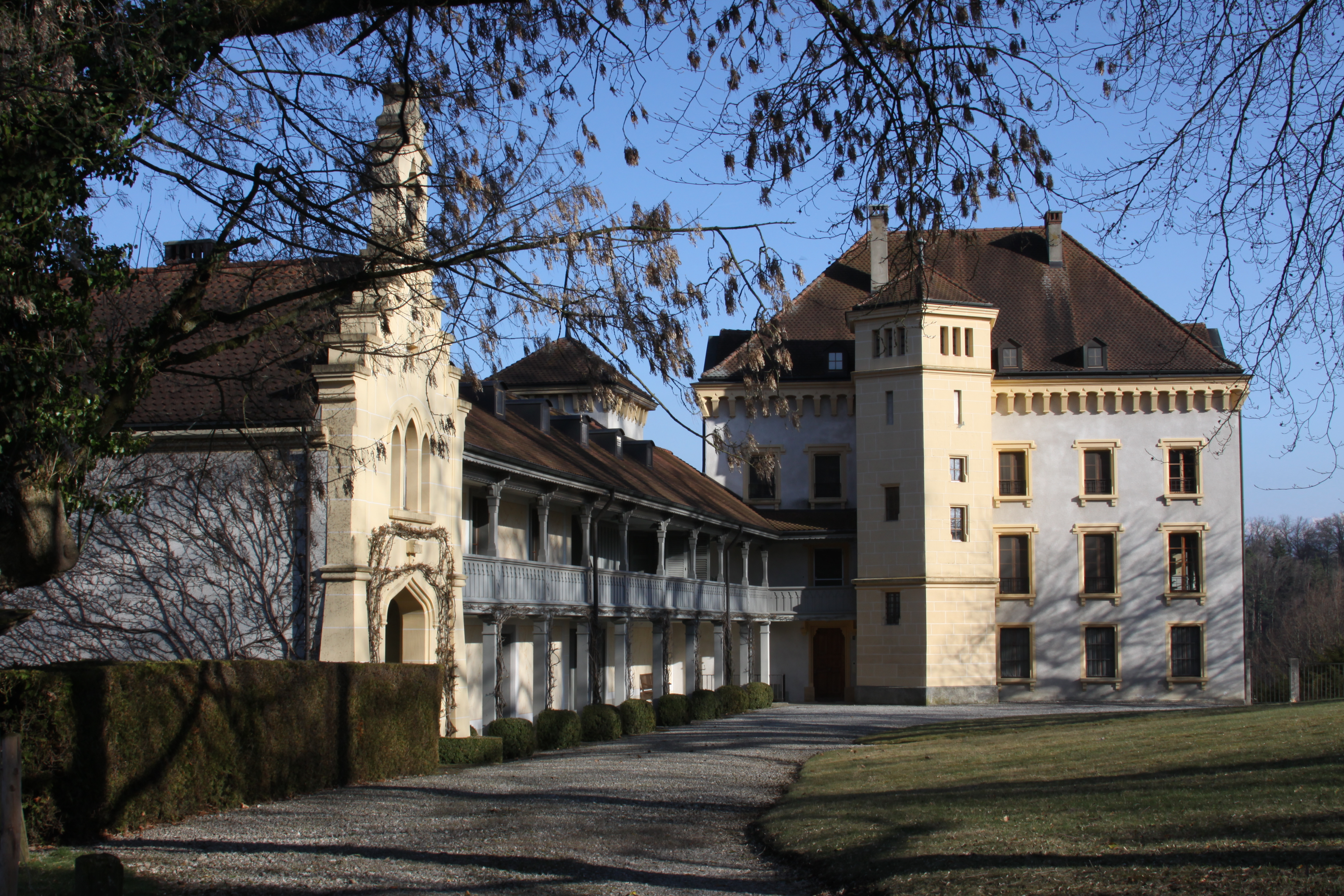
- Barberêche Castle

- Coat of arms
- Location of Barberêche
- Location within Switzerland Location within Canton of Fribourg
- Coordinates: 46°51′N 7°10′E
- Country: Switzerland
- Canton: Fribourg
- District: See/Lac

Government
  - Executive: Conseil communal with 5 members
  - Mayor: Syndic

Area
  - Total: 9.13 km^{2} (3.53 sq mi)
- Elevation: 569 m (1,867 ft)

Population (Dec 2015)
  - Total: 527
  - Density: 57.7/km^{2} (149/sq mi)
- Time zone: UTC+01:00 (CET)
  - Summer (DST): UTC+02:00 (CEST)
- Postal code: 1783
- SFOS number: 2243
- ISO 3166 code: CH-FR
- Surrounded by: La Sonnaz, Misery-Courtion, Courtepin, Gurmels, Düdingen
- Website: www.barbereche.ch

Barberêche (French pronunciation: [baʁbəʁɛʃ]; German: Bärfischen; Arpitan: Barberêtse [baʁbəˈʁɛtsə]) is a former municipality in the district of Lac in the Swiss canton of Fribourg. It lies on the "language boundary" between the French- and German-speaking parts of Switzerland. On 1 January 2017 it merged with Villarepos and Wallenried into the extant municipality of Courtepin.

== History ==
Aerial view (1964)

The Barberêche area was settled quite early on, as witnessed by archaeological finds of graves from Hallstatt times and foundations from Roman times.

The first documentary mention of Barberêche dates from 1154 under the name Barbereschi. Later names included Barberesche (1173), Barbaresche (1180), Barbareschi (1182) and Barbarica (1423). The placename goes back to an old family name Barbar(i)us.

There is evidence to show that, as of the 12th century, there was a noble family in Barberêche. The Barberêche Lordship fell in the beginning under the Dukes of Zähringen, and then later became a fiefdom of the Counts of Thierstein, before a series of changes in ownership in the 15th century. In 1442, Barberêche became part of the Alte Landschaft ("Old Territory") of Fribourg (Spitalpanner). After the collapse of the Ancien Régime in 1798, during the Helvetic Republic and the time following, the village belonged to the District of Fribourg, and from 1831 to the German District of Fribourg, before it was annexed to the Seebezirk ("Lake District") under the new cantonal constitution in 1848.

== Geography ==
Barberêche had an area, as of 2009, of 9.2 square kilometers (3.6 mi^{2}). Of this area, 5.47 km^{2} (2.11 mi^{2}) or 59.7% is used for agricultural purposes, while 1.82 km^{2} (0.70 mi^{2}) or 19.8% is forested. Of the rest of the land, 0.52 km^{2} (0.20 mi^{2}) or 5.7% is settled (buildings or roads), 1.32 km^{2} (0.51 mi^{2}) or 14.4% is either rivers or lakes.

Of the built up area, housing and buildings made up 2.8% and transportation infrastructure made up 2.4%. Out of the forested land, all of the forested land area is covered with heavy forests. Of the agricultural land, 39.0% is used for growing crops and 19.3% is pastures, while 1.3% is used for orchards or vine crops. All the water in the municipality is in lakes.

Barberêche lies 569 m (1,867 ft) above sea level, and is 5.5 km (3.4 mi) north of the cantonal capital, Fribourg (Freiburg). The surrounding rural municipality stretches along the north shore of the Schiffenensee, a small lake through which flows the river Saane/Sarine, at the foot of the Grand Bois ("Great Wood") hill on the Swiss Plateau.

The former municipality's area includes a part of the Swiss Plateau's molasse uplands. The sprawling, yet narrow, area is bordered on the southeast by the Schiffenensee. All along this reservoir's shoreline in the Barberêche area is a 20 to 50 m (66 to 164 ft) high dike topped with trees, broken here and there by sandstone cliffs. Several gullies carved by erosion empty into the lake; these have been partially flooded owing to the creation of the reservoir. The gullies divide the terrace that Barberêche is built on into several small plateaux, which themselves are abutted in the northwest by the molasse hill.

In the farthest south and southwest, the former municipality area reaches beyond the Courtepin Valley to the flats at the mouth of the stream La Sonnaz where it empties into the Schiffenensee. From here westwards, the district stretches to the Bois de la Corbaz (a wood), which reaches 650 m (2,130 ft) above sea level, and to the edge of the Bois de l'Hôpital ("Hospital Wood") (660 m [2,170 ft] above sea level). Towards the northeast, the former municipality stretches over the Breilles Heights — which at 668 m (2,192 ft) above sea level are Barberêche's highest point — the Bouley Forest, and the Grand Bois, as well as the Bulliardholz (another wood; 660 m [2,170 ft]), and on to the foot of the "Great Wood" (Grossholz) at Kleingurmels.

=== Population centers ===
Barberêche consists of several centres, namely:

- the village itself, Barberêche, 569 m (1,867 ft) above sea level.
- the village Pensier (Ger.: Penzers), 584 m (1,916 ft) above sea level, up from the mouth of the Sonnaz on the Schiffenensee.
- the hamlet Hobelet (Ger.: Hubel), 655 m (2,149 ft) above sea level, on the heights above Pensier.
- the hamlet Villaret, 610 m (2,000 ft) above sea level, above the Courtepin Valley.
- the hamlet Breilles (Ger.: Brigels), 640 m (2,100 ft) above sea level, on the edge of the Bouley.
- the hamlet Petit Vivy (Ger.: Klein-Vivers), 590 m (1,940 ft) above sea level, on the terrace above the Schiffenensee east of the Grand Bois.
- the hamlet Grand Vivy (Ger.: Gross-Vivers), 565 m (1,854 ft) above sea level, on the terrace above the Schiffenensee east of the Bulliardholz.
- the hamlet Grimoine (Ger.: Courmoen), 565 m (1,854 ft) above sea level, on the terrace above the Schiffenensee south of Kleingurmels.

Neighboring municipalities to Barberêche are La Sonnaz, Misery-Courtion, Courtepin, Gurmels and Düdingen.

== Coat of arms ==
The blazon of the municipal coat of arms is Per fess Gules a Cross bottony Argent and Argent a Rose Gules barbed Vert.

== Demographics ==
Barberêche had a population (as of 2015) of 527. As of 2008, 13.0% of the population are resident foreign nationals. The most heavily populated place in the municipality is Pensier with about 250 people; only about 100 people live in the village of Barberêche itself.

Over the last 10 years (2000–2010) the population has changed at a rate of -5.9%. Migration accounted for -1.4%, while births and deaths accounted for 2.8%.

As of 2008, the population was 51.1% male and 48.9% female. The population was made up of 247 Swiss men (45.7% of the population) and 29 (5.4%) non-Swiss men. There were 216 Swiss women (40.0%) and 48 (8.9%) non-Swiss women. Of the population in the municipality, 171 or about 31.0% were born in Barberêche and lived there in 2000. There were 191 or 34.7% who were born in the same canton, while 100 or 18.1% were born somewhere else in Switzerland, and 82 or 14.9% were born outside of Switzerland. As of 2000, children and teenagers (0–19 years old) make up 20.7% of the population, while adults (20–64 years old) make up 65% and seniors (over 64 years old) make up 14.3%. As of 2000, there were 253 people who were single and never married in the municipality. There were 254 married individuals, 27 widows or widowers and 17 individuals who are divorced.

As of 2000, there were 184 private households in the municipality, and an average of 2.6 persons per household. There were 51 households that consist of only one person and 22 households with five or more people. In 2000, a total of 172 apartments (82.3% of the total) were permanently occupied, while 31 apartments (14.8%) were seasonally occupied and 6 apartments (2.9%) were empty. The vacancy rate for the municipality, in 2010, was 0.47%.

The historical population is given in the following chart:

== Heritage sites of national significance ==
Grand-Vivy Castle, Barberêche Castle, Petit-Vivy Castle, the barn and stable at Chemin de la Fruiterie 5 A and the granary at Route de Grimoine 20 B are listed as Swiss heritage site of national significance. The area around Petit and Grand-Vivy is part of the Inventory of Swiss Heritage Sites.

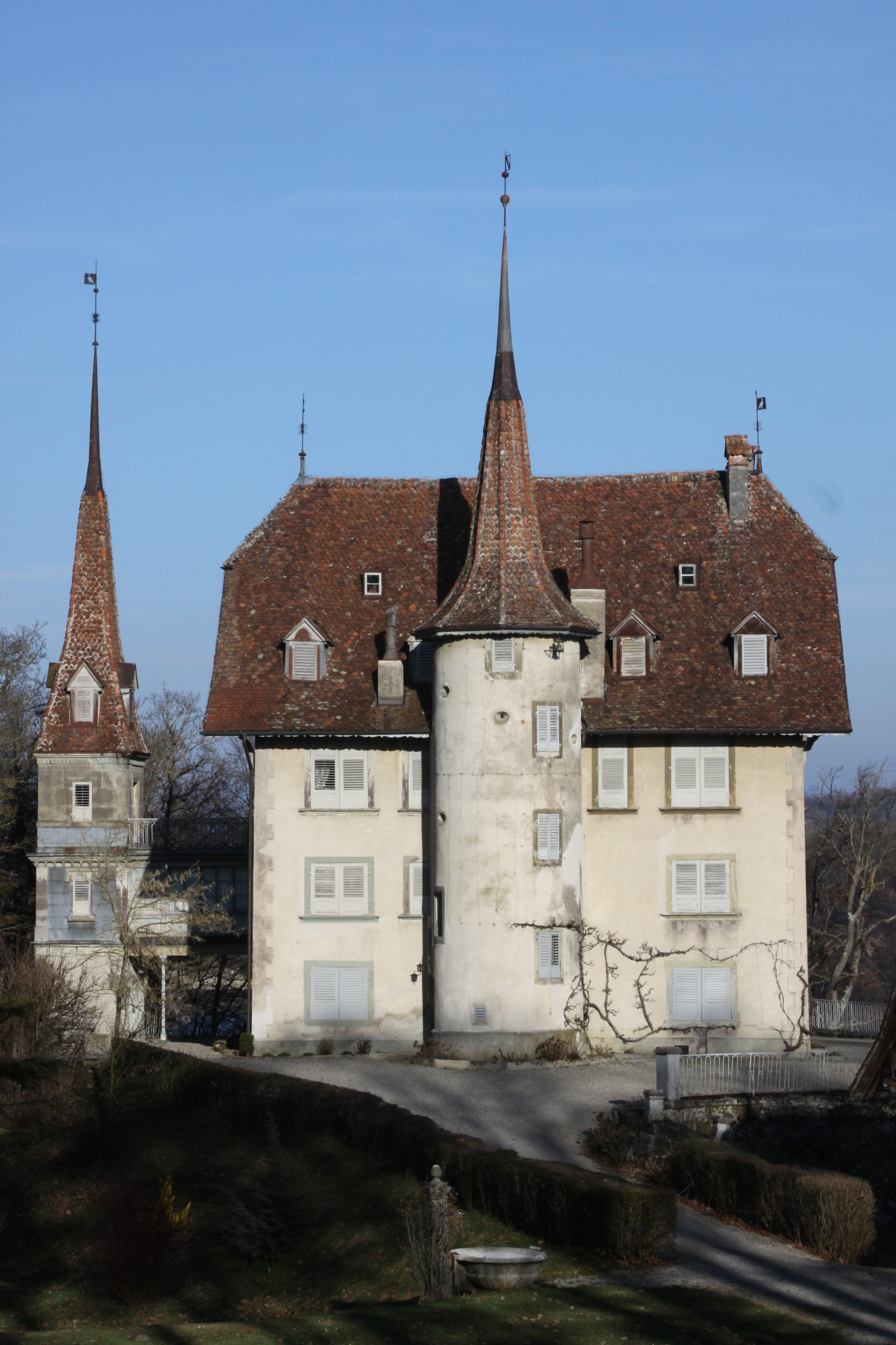
Grand-Vivy Castle

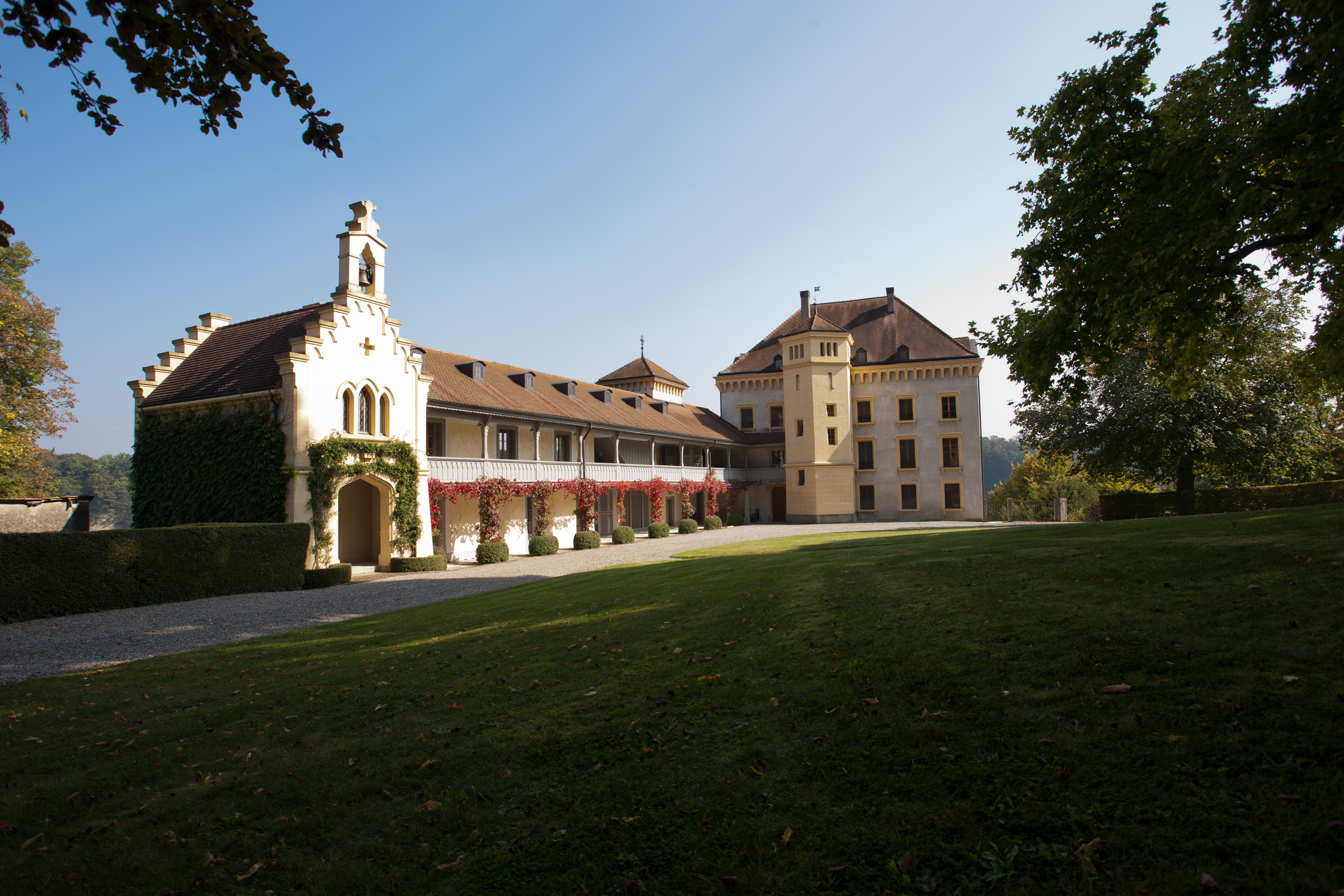
Barberêche Castle

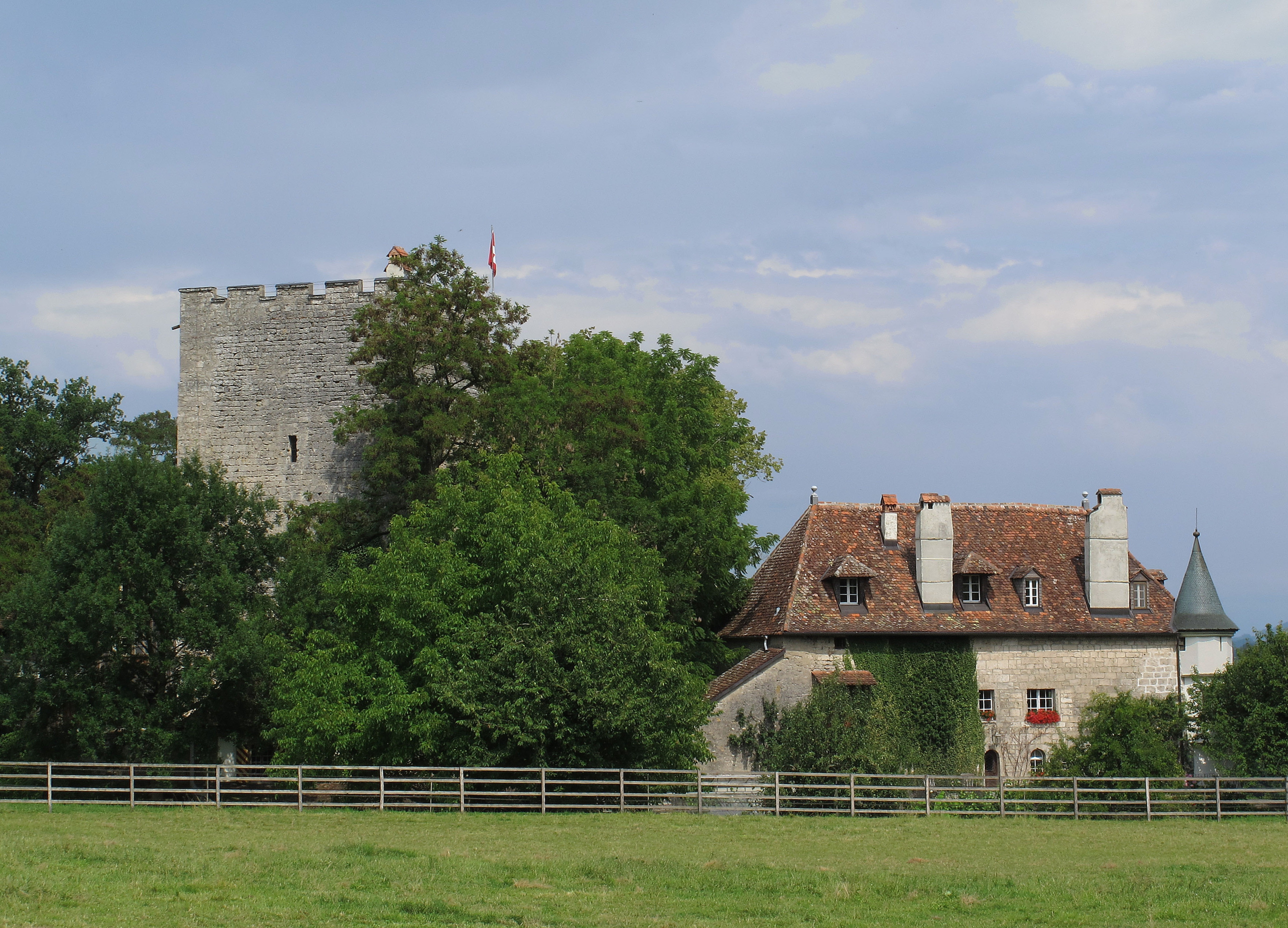
Petit-Vivy Castle

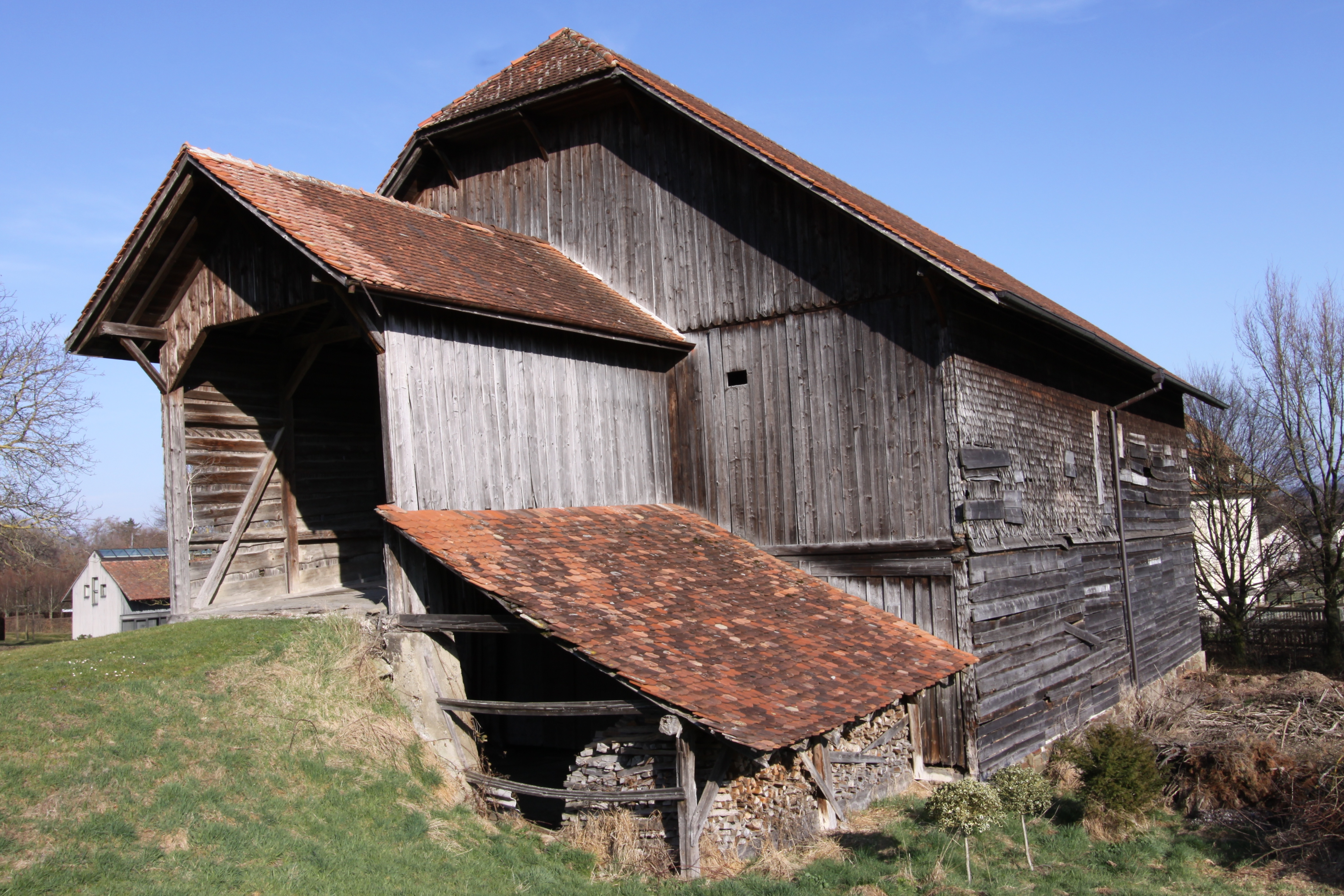
Barn and Stable

=== Sightseeing ===
The oldest parts of the parish church of Saint Maurice date back to the 11th century. It was enlarged in 1785-86 and underwent modifications in the 19th century. It has a quire with a semicircular apse and overhanging arcades in early mediaeval style. The church contains wall paintings from the 18th century, woodcarvings, and coats of arms in the stained glass. The parsonage next to the church dates from 1566.

On the edge of the plateau, right above the Schiffenensee, stands Barberêche Castle. It was built between 1522 and 1528, likely on the site of an earlier fortification, under Petermann de Praroman's direction in the late Gothic style. From 1839 until 1844, the castle underwent considerable remodeling, whereby the castle took its current shape in the neo-Gothic and neoclassical styles. The castle is today privately owned.

Furthermore, over the dike surrounding the Schiffenensee, northeast of Barberêche, stands Petit-Vivy Castle. It is among the oldest preserved castles in the region. The still-preserved, mighty, four-sided keep was built in the second half of the 13th century, and has 3.5-m-thick walls. Around the keep are the remains of former surrounding walls, arranged in triangular form. The residential buildings were built in the 16th century.

Farther northeast is Grand-Vivy Castle on a narrow outcrop between the Schiffenensee and a small stream. This was also the site of a medieval castle, but this was replaced by today's late-Gothic structure with its semicircular stairway tower, and other tower construction. The chapel next to the castle was built in the 19th century.

== Twin Town ==
Barberêche is twinned with the town of Zeuthen, Germany.

== Politics ==
In the 2011 federal election the most popular party was the SPS which received 24.9% of the vote. The next three most popular parties were the CVP (22.6%), the SVP (20.3%) and the FDP (8.7%).

The SPS improved their position in Barberêche rising to first, from third in 2007 (with 18.5%) The CVP retained about the same popularity (22.5% in 2007), the SVP moved from first in 2007 (with 25.0%) to third and the FDP retained about the same popularity (10.4% in 2007). A total of 205 votes were cast in this election, of which 3 or 1.5% were invalid.

== Economy ==
Barberêche was until the second half of the 20th century a village whose livelihood was firmly rooted in agriculture. Even today, tilling the soil, growing fruit, and raising cattle are important to the local economy. Other jobs are to be found in small business and the service sector. There is a commercial area in Pensier. Until 1976, there was a boarding school at Barberêche (Institut Saint-Dominique). Over the last few decades, the village has developed itself into a wealthy agriculture community. Many of the residents nowadays are commuters who work in Fribourg.

As of 2010, Barberêche had an unemployment rate of 2%. As of 2008, there were 60 people employed in the primary economic sector and about 22 businesses involved in this sector. 8 people were employed in the secondary sector and there were 5 businesses in this sector. 95 people were employed in the tertiary sector, with 15 businesses in this sector. There were 287 residents of the municipality who were employed in some capacity, of which females made up 38.0% of the workforce.

In 2008 the total number of full-time equivalent jobs was 117. The number of jobs in the primary sector was 42, all of which were in agriculture. The number of jobs in the secondary sector was 7 of which 3 or (42.9%) were in manufacturing and 1 was in construction. The number of jobs in the tertiary sector was 68. In the tertiary sector; 17 or 25.0% were in wholesale or retail sales or the repair of motor vehicles, 8 or 11.8% were in a hotel or restaurant, 1 was in the information industry, 8 or 11.8% were technical professionals or scientists, 3 or 4.4% were in education and 9 or 13.2% were in health care.

In 2000, there were 55 workers who commuted into the municipality and 185 workers who commuted away. The municipality is a net exporter of workers, with about 3.4 workers leaving the municipality for every one entering. Of the working population, 10.5% used public transportation to get to work, and 52.6% used a private car.

== Religion ==
From the 2000 census, 404 or 73.3% were Roman Catholic, while 101 or 18.3% belonged to the Swiss Reformed Church. Of the rest of the population, there were 2 members of an Orthodox church (or about 0.36% of the population), and there were 4 individuals (or about 0.73% of the population) who belonged to another Christian church. There were 6 (or about 1.09% of the population) who were Islamic. There was 1 person who was Hindu and 2 individuals who belonged to another church. 25 (or about 4.54% of the population) belonged to no church, are agnostic or atheist, and 8 individuals (or about 1.45% of the population) did not answer the question.

== Education ==
In Barberêche about 190 or (34.5%) of the population have completed non-mandatory upper secondary education, and 93 or (16.9%) have completed additional higher education (either university or a Fachhochschule). Of the 93 who completed tertiary schooling, 57.0% were Swiss men, 21.5% were Swiss women, 10.8% were non-Swiss men and 10.8% were non-Swiss women.

The Canton of Fribourg school system provides one year of non-obligatory Kindergarten, followed by six years of Primary school. This is followed by three years of obligatory lower Secondary school where the students are separated according to ability and aptitude. Following the lower Secondary students may attend a three- or four-year optional upper Secondary school. The upper Secondary school is divided into gymnasium (university preparatory) and vocational programs. After they finish the upper Secondary program, students may choose to attend a Tertiary school or continue their apprenticeship.

During the 2010-11 school year, there were a total of 48 students attending 3 classes in Barberêche. A total of 99 students from the municipality attended any school, either in the municipality or outside of it. There were no kindergarten classes in the municipality, but 11 students attended kindergarten in a neighboring municipality. The municipality had 2 primary classes and 38 students. During the same year, there were no lower secondary classes in the municipality, but 18 students attended lower secondary school in a neighboring municipality. There were no upper Secondary classes or vocational classes, but there were 15 upper Secondary students and 14 upper Secondary vocational students who attended classes in another municipality. The municipality had no non-university Tertiary classes, but there was one specialized Tertiary student who attended classes in another municipality.

As of 2000, there were 37 students from Barberêche who attended schools outside the municipality.

== Languages ==
Most of the population (as of 2000) speaks French (409 or 74.2%) as their first language, German is the second most common (120 or 21.8%) and Portuguese is the third (7 or 1.3%). There are 5 people who speak Italian. Until the 15th century, the local language was almost exclusively German. The French-speaking community slowly grew until in the 18th and 19th centuries, the village was bilingual. French has been the majority language in Barberêche since about 1860.

== Transportation ==
The municipality is well connected, even though it lies far from the main highways. The nearest expressway interchange, A12 (Bern-Vevey) lies about 5 km (3.1 mi) from the center of the municipality. On 23 August 1898, the railway line from Fribourg to Murten opened, with a station in Pensier. The village of Barberêche itself has no public transport connections.

== Famous people ==
- Joseph Deiss, politician, former Federal Councillor and President of the Confederation (2004); also a former mayor of Barberêche.
