= Grand-Vivy Castle =

Castle in Courtepin, Switzerland

- Courtepin
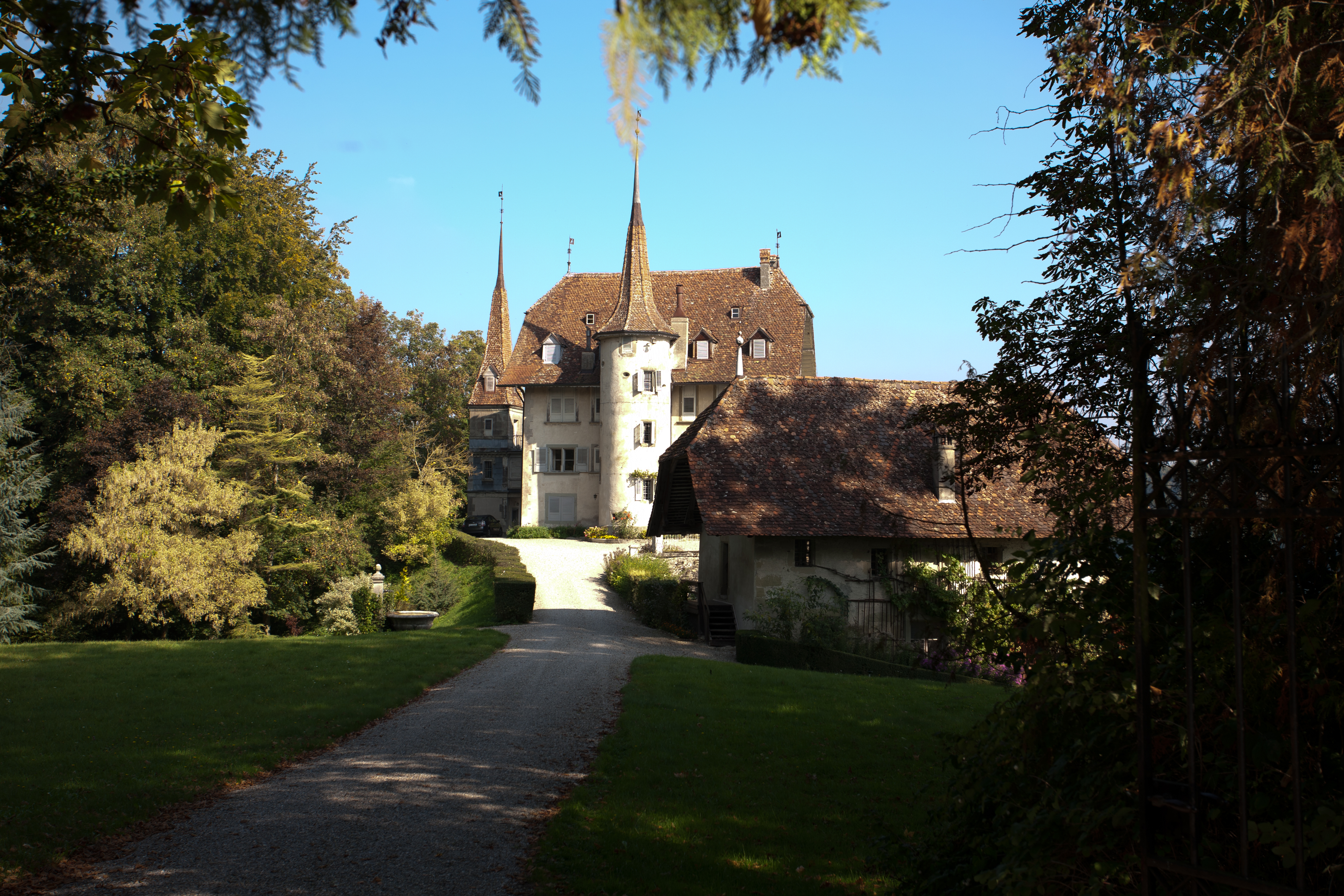
- Grand-Vivy Castle

Site information
- Code: CH-FR

Location
- Coordinates: 46°52′16″N 7°10′36″E

Grand-Vivy Castle is a castle in the former municipality of Barberêche (now part of Courtepin) in the Canton of Fribourg in Switzerland. It is a Swiss Heritage Site of National Significance.

== See also ==
- List of castles and fortresses in Switzerland
