= Mixed language =

Language that arises amongst a bilingual group

A mixed language, also referred to as a hybrid language or fusion language, is a type of contact language that arises among a bilingual group combining aspects of two or more languages but not clearly deriving primarily from any single language. It differs from a creole or pidgin language in that, whereas creoles/pidgins arise where speakers of many languages acquire a common language, a mixed language typically arises in a population that is fluent in both of the source languages.

Because all languages show some degree of mixing by virtue of containing loanwords, it is a matter of controversy whether the concept of a mixed language can meaningfully be distinguished from the type of contact and borrowing seen in all languages. Scholars debate to what extent language mixture can be distinguished from other mechanisms such as code-switching, substrata, or lexical borrowing.

== Definitions ==
Other terms used in linguistics for the concept of a mixed language include hybrid language and fusion language; in older usage, 'jargon' was sometimes used in this sense. In some linguists' usage, creoles and pidgins are types of mixed languages, whereas in others' usage, creoles and pidgins are merely among the kinds of language that might become full-fledged mixed languages.

Thomason (1995) classifies mixed languages into two categories: Category 1 languages exhibit "heavy influence from the dominant group's language in all aspects of structure and grammar as well as lexicon" (Winford 171). Category 2 languages show a "categorial specificity of the structural borrowing" or a uniform borrowing of specific categories (Winford).

Mixed language and intertwined language are seemingly interchangeable terms for some researchers. Some use the term "intertwining" instead of "mixing" because the former implies "mixture of two systems which are not necessarily the same order" nor does it suggest "replacement of either the lexicon or of the grammatical system", unlike relexification, massive grammatical replacement, and re-grammaticalization. The grammar of a mixed language typically comes from a language well known to first-generation speakers, which Arends claims is the language spoken by the mother. This is because of the close relationship between mother and child and the likelihood that the language is spoken by the community at large.

Arends et al. classify an intertwined language as a language that "has lexical morphemes from one language and grammatical morphemes from another". This definition does not include Michif, which combines French lexical items in specific contexts, but still utilizes Cree lexical and grammatical items.

Yaron Matras distinguishes between three types of models for mixed language: "language maintenance and language shift, unique and predetermined processes ("intertwining"), and "conventionalisation of language mixing patterns". The first model involves the use of one language for heavy substitutions of entire grammatical paradigms or morphology of another language. This is because a speech community will not adopt a newer dominant language, and so adapt their language with grammatical material from the dominant language. Bakker (1997) argues that mixed languages result from mixed populations. Languages "intertwine", in that the morphosyntax (provided by female native speakers) mixes with the lexicon of another language (spoken by men, often in a colonialist context). This appears to have been the case with Michif, where European men and Cree, Nakota, and Ojibwe women had offspring who learned a mixture of French and Cree. The third model "assumes a gradual loss of the conversational function of language alternation as a means of expressing contrast". In other words, language no longer becomes a means of differentiation between two speech communities as a result of language mixing.

Lexical reorientation, according to Matras, is defined as "the conscious shifting of the linguistic field that is responsible for encoding meaning or conceptual representations away from the language in which linguistic interaction is normally managed, organised, and processed: speakers adopt in a sense one linguistic system to express lexical meaning (or symbols, in the Buhlerian sense of the term) and another to organize the relations among lexical symbols, as well as within sentences, utterances, and interaction. The result is a split, by source language, between lexicon and grammar."

== Differentiation with other language mixtures ==
A mixed language differs from pidgins, creoles and code-switching in very fundamental ways. During the period of language formation, speakers of a mixed language are fluent, or even native, in both languages (though this may dwindle in later generations, as in the case of Michif). Pidgins, on the other hand, develop in a situation, usually in the context of trade, where speakers of two (or more) different languages come into contact and need to find some way to communicate with each other. Creoles develop when a pidgin language becomes a first language for young speakers. While creoles tend to have drastically simplified morphologies, mixed languages often retain the inflectional complexities of one, or both, of the parent languages. For instance, Michif retains the complexities of its Cree verb-phrases and its French noun-phrases.

It also differs from a language that has undergone heavy borrowing, such as Korean, Japanese, and Vietnamese from Chinese (see Sino-Xenic), English from French, or Maltese from Sicilian/Italian. In these cases, despite the heavy borrowing, the grammar and basic words of the borrowing language remain relatively unchanged, with the borrowed words confined mainly to more abstract or foreign concepts, and any complex morphology remains that of the host language rather than being borrowed along with the borrowed word. In the case of Maltese, for example, if verbs borrowed from Italian were inflected using Italian inflectional rules rather than Arabic-derived ones, then Maltese would be a candidate for being a mixed language.

Finally, a mixed language differs from code-switching, such as Spanglish or Portuñol, in that, once it has developed, the fusion of the source languages is fixed in the grammar and vocabulary, and speakers do not need to know the source languages in order to speak it. But, linguists believe that mixed languages evolve from persistent code-switching, with younger generations picking up the code-switching, but not necessarily the source languages that generated it.

Languages such as Franglais and Anglo-Romani are not mixed languages, or even examples of code-switching, but registers of a language (here French and English), characterized by large numbers of loanwords from a second language (here English and Romani). Middle English (the immediate fore-runner of Modern English) developed from such a situation, incorporating many Norman borrowings into Old English, but it is not considered a mixed language.

== Proposed examples ==
=== Michif ===
Michif derives nouns, numerals, definite/indefinite articles, possessive pronouns, some adverbs and adjectives from French, while it derives demonstratives (in/animate), question words, verbs (in/animacy agreement with the subject/object), and some adverbs/verb-like adjectives from Cree. The Cree components of Michif generally remain grammatically intact, while the French lexicon and grammar is restricted to noun phrases where nouns occur with a French possessive element or article (i.e. in/definite, masculine/feminine, singular/plural). Further, many speakers of Michif are able to identify the French and Cree components of a given sentence, likely from the phonological and morphological features of words. Although the phonological systems of both French and Cree are generally independent in Michif, there is convergence in 1) mid-vowel raising, 2) sibilant harmony, 3) vowel length (e.g. French vowel pairs [i]/[ɪ] and [a]/[ɑ] differ in length as in Cree), and 4) instances where the three nasal vowels /æ̃/, /ũ/, and /ĩ/ occur in the Cree components, although this last point of convergence may be due to Ojibwe influence. Scholars propose that, in the Métis multilingual community, Michif emerged as a need to symbolize a new social identity. The first unambiguous mention of Michif dates to the 1930s.

The Métis of St. Laurent, a tribe of indigenous people in Canada, were made to feel their language was a sign of inferiority by nuns, priests, and other missionaries who insisted that the Metis switch to Standard Canadian French. Because missionaries stigmatized Michif French as an inferior, "bastardized" form of Canadian French, the Métis began to develop a sense of inferiority and shame which they associated with speaking Michif. Although Michif may have arisen as a way for Métis people to identify themselves, it became taboo to speak Michif inter-ethnically.

In an attempt to make students unlearn Michif French, some nuns used a "token-system" in which each student was given ten tokens each week, and for every use of Michif French, a student would have to surrender a token. Students with the most tokens were rewarded with a prize. Overall, this system did not work.

=== Mednyj Aleut ===
Mednyj Aleut is identified as a mixed language composed of mostly intact systematic components from two typologically and genetically unrelated languages: Aleut and Russian. This mixed language's grammar and lexicon are both largely Aleut in origin, while the finite verb morphology, a whole grammatical subsystem, is primarily of Russian origin. Nonetheless, there are some syntactic patterns with Russian influence and some Aleut features in the finite verb complex such as, 1) a topic-number agreement pattern, 2) Aleut pronouns with unaccusatives, 3) the Aleut agglutinative tense + number + person/number pattern in one of two alternative past-tense forms. Scholars hypothesize that due to the elaborate Russian and Aleut components of Mednyj Aleut, the Aleut/Russian creoles in which the mixed language arose must have been fluent bilinguals of Aleut and Russian and, therefore, not a pidgin language—that is, "imperfect learning" is usually a feature in the emergence of a pidgin. Furthermore, some code-switching and deliberate decisions likely served as mechanisms for the development of Mednyj Aleut and it is possible that these were motivated by a need for a language that reflected the community's new group identity.

=== Ma'a ===
Ma’a has been alleged to be a language with a Cushitic basic vocabulary and a primarily Bantu grammatical structure. The language also shares phonological features with languages in the Cushitic phylum (most prominently the voiceless lateral fricative /ɬ/, the glottal stop /ʔ/, and the voiceless velar fricative /x/, that do not occur in Bantu languages of the area), as well as syntactic structures, derivational processes, and a feature of inflectional morphology. However, few productive non-lexical structures in Ma’a appear derived from Cushitic. Sarah G. Thomason therefore argues for a classification of Ma’a as a mixed language since it does not have enough Cushitic grammar to be genetically related to the Cushitic language. By contrast, Ma’a has a productive set of inflectional structures derived from Bantu, including noun classification, number category, and verb morphology patterns. Ma’a also demonstrates phonological structures derived from Bantu — for instance, the prenasalized voiced stops /ᵐb ⁿd ᶮɟ ᵑg/ and phonemic tones – and loss of typical Cushitic features such as pharyngeal fricatives, labialized stops, ejectives, and all final consonants. Syntactic and derivational patterns in Ma’a vary between Cushitic and Bantu origins; some Ma’a constructions, such as genitive and copula constructions, are both from Cushitic and Bantu. These observations, in view of additional language contact cases like Cappadocian Greek, Anglo-Romani, and Mednyj Aleut, suggest that Ma'a arose as a product of massive interference from a Bantu language via intense cultural pressure on a Cushitic-speaking community.

Newer research has moreover drawn more attention to the Bantu language known as Mbugu, spoken by the same ethnic group: it has proven to be identical in its grammar to Ma'a, to possess a lexicon with identical semantic and morphological organization, and to be known by all speakers of Ma'a. Mbugu and Ma'a are therefore today considered a single language with two separate lexical registers, instead of two parallel "mixed" and "unmixed" languages. While the deep penetration of Cushitic vocabulary and its consistent stratification apart from Bantu vocabulary demands an exceptional account for the language's formation, inherited Bantu lexicon is therefore regardless also still present in the language.

=== Media Lengua ===
Media Lengua (roughly translated to "half language" or "in-between language"), also known as Chaupi-shimi, Chaupi-lengua, Chaupi-Quichua, Quichuañol, Chapu-shimi or llanga-shimi, (Note: Llanga-shimi is typically a derogatory term used by speakers of Quichua to describe their language. However, it also appears to describe Media Lengua in the Imbabura Communities. It is believed that the term was introduced by Mestizo school teachers to further discredit the indigenous populations) is a mixed language that consists of Spanish vocabulary and Ecuadorian Quichua grammar, most conspicuously in its morphology. Almost all lexemes (89%), including core vocabulary, are of Spanish origin and appear to conform to Quichua phonotactics. Media Lengua is one of the few widely acknowledged examples of a "bilingual mixed language" in both the conventional and narrow linguistic sense because of its split between roots and suffixes. Such extreme and systematic borrowing is only rarely attested, and Media Lengua is not typically described as a variety of either Quichua or Spanish. Arends et al. list two languages subsumed under the name Media Lengua: Salcedo Media Lengua and Media Lengua of Saraguro. The northern variety of Media Lengua, found in the province of Imbabura, is commonly referred to as Imbabura Media Lengua and more specifically, the dialect varieties within the province are known as Pijal Media Lengua and Anglas Media Lengua.

Scholars indicate that Media Lengua arose largely via relexification mechanisms. Pieter Muysken suggests that the social context in which the language emerged as an intralanguage involved a presence of "acculturated Indians" that neither identified with traditional, rural Quechua nor with urban Spanish cultures. This is an instance of a language developing from a need for "ethnic self-identification".

=== Light Warlpiri ===
Light Warlpiri, seen as a form of Warlpiri by speakers, derives verbs and verbal morphology largely from Australian Kriol, while nouns are largely from Warlpiri and English and nominal morphology from Warlpiri. Light Warlpiri likely developed as an intralanguage via code-mixing between Warlpiri and either Kriol or English. This code-mixing conventionalized into Light Warlpiri, which is now learned by Lajamanu children as a first language, along with Warlpiri, although Light Warlpiri is often produced first and used in daily interactions with younger speakers and adults within the Lajamanu community. Light Warlpiri is considered a new language for several reasons: 1) Light Warlpiri speakers use an auxiliary verb-system that older Warlpiri speakers do not while code-mixing, 2) elements are distributed differently in Light Warlpiri than in code-mixing varieties of older Warlpiri speakers, 3) Light Warlpiri is a native language, which indicates stability of the language, and 4) grammatical structures and lexical items from each source language occur consistently in Light Warlpiri.

=== Gurindji Kriol ===
Gurindji Kriol exhibits a structural split between the noun phrase and verb phrase, with Gurindji contributing the noun structure including case-marking, and the verb structure including TAM (tense-aspect-mood) auxiliaries coming from Kriol. In this respect, Gurindji Kriol is classified as a verb-noun (V-N) mixed language. Other examples of V-N mixed languages include Michif and Light Warlpiri. The maintenance of Gurindji within the mixed language can be seen as the perpetuation of Aboriginal identity under massive and continuing cultural incursion.

=== Cappadocian Greek and Cypriot Arabic ===
Both Cappadocian Greek and Cypriot Maronite-Arabic are cases of extreme borrowing—the former from Turkish and the latter from Greek. The remaining Greek dialects of Asia Minor display borrowing of vocabulary, function words, derivational morphology, and some borrowed nominal and verbal inflectional morphology from Turkish. Cypriot Arabic largely shows borrowing of vocabulary, and consequently Greek morphosyntax. Both Cappadocian Greek and Cypriot Arabic (as well as Ma'a) differ socially from Michif and Mednyj Aleut because they have evolved out of intense language contact, extensive bilingualism, and a strong pressure for speakers to shift to the dominant language. Nonetheless, neither language has an entire grammar and lexicon that is derived from a single historical source and in each case the linguistic group achieves fluent bilingualism. The social context in which they arose largely distinguishes them from pidgins and creoles and, for some scholars, identifies them closely with mixed languages.

=== Kaqchikel-K'iche' Mayan language ===
The Kaqchikel-K'iche' Mixed Language, also known as the Cauqué Mixed Language or Cauqué Mayan, is spoken in the aldea of Santa María Cauqué, Santiago Sacatepéquez, Department of Sacatepéquez in Guatemala. A 1998 study by the Summer Institute of Linguistics (SIL) estimated speaker population at 2,000. While the language's grammatical base is from K'iche', its lexicon is supplied by Kaqchikel.

=== Other possible mixed languages ===
- Surzhyk, a freeform mixture of Ukrainian and Russian spoken in rural areas of Ukraine.
- Bolze, a mixture of French and Swiss German spoken in the Basse-Ville district of Fribourg, Switzerland.
- Bonin English, a mix of Japanese and English Creole.
- Gadal, or Tagdal, a Songhay base with a majority-Tuareg vocabulary, sometimes considered a mixed language.
- Jopara, a mixture of Guaraní and Spanish that involves incorporating elements of Spanish grammar and vocabulary into Guaraní.
- Kallawaya
- Língua Geral Amazônica and Língua Geral Paulista, important historical languages spoken in colonial Brazil, composed mainly of Amerindian (predominantly Tupi) lexicon and Portuguese structure.
- Lomavren, a combination of Armenian and Indo-Aryan.
- Makassar Malay, mixing Malay and Makassarese elements.
- Missingsch, Low Saxon grammar, pronunciation, pragmatics, loanwords and substrate and German vocabulary.
- Para-Romani languages such as Erromintxela, which derives most of its lexicon from Kalderash Romani but uses Basque grammar and syntax.
- Petuh, Danish grammar and semantics with German vocabulary.
- Reo Rapa, a mixture of Tahitian and Old Rapa.
- Shaetlan, a mixture of Lowland Scots and the now extinct Norn.
- Siculo-Arbëresh as spoken in Sicily may possibly be classed as a mixed language, as it is largely mixed Sicilian and Arbëresh lexicon with Arbëresh grammar.
- Yiddish, theorised by Max Weinreich to have used elements of Zarphatic, Judeo-Italian, Middle High German, versions of Biblical Hebrew including Talmudic and post-Talmudic, and various Slavic languages, including Czech, Ukrainian, Polish, Belarusian, and Russian.

=== Possible mixed languages with a Chinese element ===
- Wutunhua, a mix of Chinese and Mongol
- Dao, Chinese–Tibetan
- E, a mix of one of the Zhuang languages and Pinghua Chinese
- Lingling and Maojia, Mandarin–Miao
- Tangwang, Mandarin–Santa
- Waxiang, Hunanese–Miao
- Hezhou, Uyghur–Mandarin
- Chinglish, a mix of English with a Chinese language, especially when spoken by second-generation Chinese
- Kelantan Peranakan Hokkien, a mix of Hokkien, Kelantan-Pattani Malay and Southern Thai.
- Philippine Hybrid Hokkien, a mix of Philippine Hokkien, Tagalog, and English.

== Controversy ==
In 1861, Max Müller denied "the possibility of a mixed language". In 1881, William D. Whitney wrote the following, expressing skepticism regarding the chances of a language being proven a mixed language.

Such a thing as the adoption on the part of one tongue, by a direct process, of any part or parts of the formal structure of another tongue has, so far as is known, not come under the notice of linguistic students during the recorded periods of language-history. So far as these are concerned, it appears to be everywhere the case that when the speakers of two languages, A and B, are brought together into one community, there takes place no amalgamation of their speech, into AB; but for a time the two maintain their own several identity, only as modified each by the admission of material from the other in accordance with the ordinary laws of mixture; we may call them A^{b} and B^{a}, and not AB. [...] [W]e shall doubtless meet now and then with the claim that such and such a case presents peculiar conditions which separate it from the general class, and that some remote and difficult problem in language-history is to be solved by admitting promiscuous mixture. Any one advancing such a claim, however, does it at his peril; the burden of proof is upon him to show what the peculiar conditions might have been, and how they should have acted to produce the exceptional result; he will be challenged to bring forward some historically authenticated case of analogous results; and his solution, if not rejected altogether, will be looked upon with doubt and misgiving until he shall have complied with these reasonable requirements.

Wilhelm Schmidt was an important proponent of the idea of mixed languages in the very late 19th and early 20th century. In the judgement of Thomas Sebeok, Schmidt produced "not a scrap of evidence" for his theory. Margaret Schlauch provides a summary of the various objections to Schmidt's theory of Sprachmischung, by prominent linguists such as Alfredo Trombetti, Antoine Meillet and A. Kholodovich.

Despite the old and broad consensus that rejected the idea of a "mixed language", Thomason and Kaufman in 1988 proposed to revive the idea that some languages had shared genealogy. Meakins, who finds Thomason and Kaufman's account credible, suggests that a mixed language results from the fusion of usually two source languages, normally in situations of thorough bilingualism, so that it is not possible to classify the resulting language as belonging to either of the language families that were its sources.

Despite these recent efforts to rehabilitate mixed languages as an idea, many linguists remained unconvinced. For example, van Driem rejects one by one each of Thomason and Kaufman's examples as well as those more recently proposed. Most recently, Versteegh rejects the notion of a mixed language, writing that at "no point is it necessary to posit a category of mixed languages."

In the opinion of linguist Maarten Mous the notion of mixed languages has been rejected because "[m]ixed languages pose a challenge to historical linguistics because these languages defy classification. One attitude towards mixed languages has been that they simply do not exist, and that the claims for mixed languages are instances of a naive use of the term. The inhibition to accept the existence of mixed languages is linked to the fact that it was inconceivable how they could emerge, and moreover their mere existence posited a threat to the validity of the comparative method and to genetic linguistics."

== See also ==
- Code-switching
- Creole language
- Diglossia
- Hybrid word
- Interlinguistics
- Koiné language
- Language contact
- Language transfer
- Manually coded language (the vocabulary of a sign language with the grammar of an oral language, but without an established language community)
- Macaronic language – Text using a mixture of languages
- Metatypy
- Pidgin
- Relexification
- Translanguaging
