= Dao language (China) =

Chinese–Tibetan mixed language of Southwest China

Dao
- Native to: China
- Region: Yajiang County, Sichuan
- Native speakers: (2,685 cited 1995)
- Language family: mixed Mandarin–Tibetan

Language codes
- ISO 639-3: None (mis)
- Glottolog: daoh1239

The Dao language or Daohua (Chinese: 倒话; pinyin: dàohuà; lit. 'inverted language') is a Chinese–Tibetan mixed language or creolized language of Yajiang County, Sichuan, China. Word order is SOV as in Tibetan (Yeshes Vodgsal Atshogs 2004:6), while the lexicon consists of words derived from both Chinese and Tibetan.

== Distribution ==
Yeshes Vodgsal Atshogs (2004:6) reports that Dao is spoken in the following townships of Yajiang County, Sichuan, China. Within these administrative townships, Dao is spoken in 8 villages, comprising a total of 504 households and 2,685 individuals as of 1995.

- Hekou town 河口镇 (including Mazishi village 麻子石村)
- Bajiaolou township 八角楼乡
- Xiala township 呷拉乡

Choyo, a Qiangic language, is spoken just to the north of Dao, and is also spoken in Xiala township 呷拉乡.

== See also ==
- Selibu language
- Wutun language
