= Schiffenensee =

Artificial lake in Fribourg, Switzerland

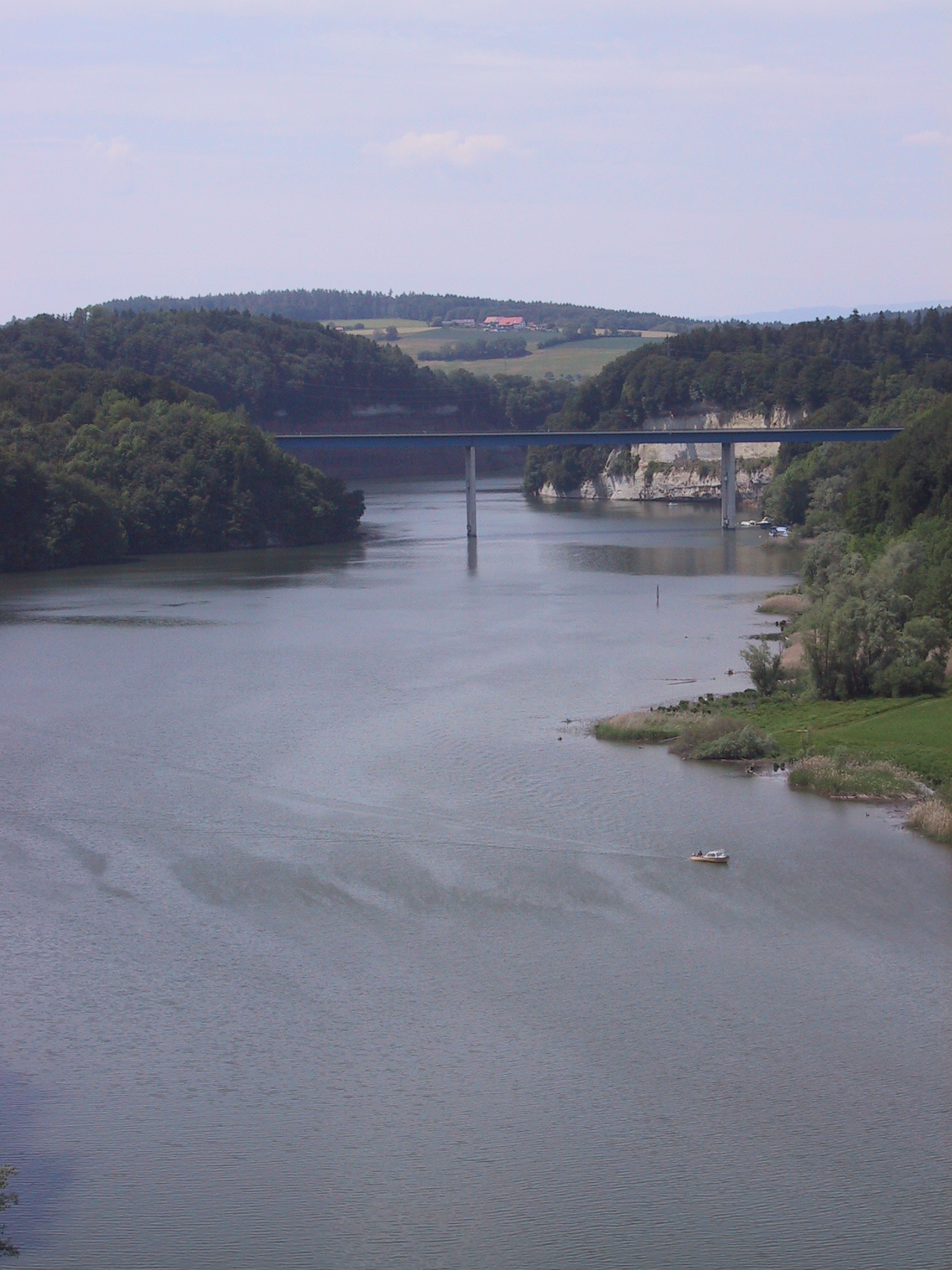

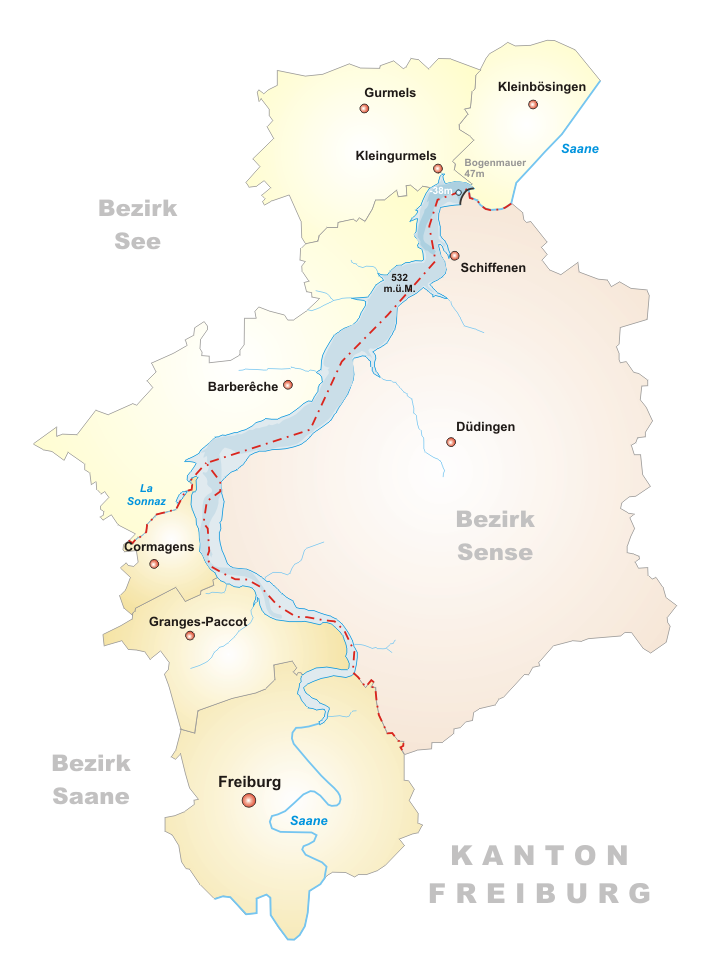
- Map

- Location within Canton of Fribourg Location within Switzerland Location within Alps
- Interactive map of Schiffenensee
- Location: Canton of Fribourg
- Coordinates: 46°51′16″N 7°09′59″E
- Type: artificial
- Primary inflows: Saane/Sarine, La Sonnaz, Horiabach
- Primary outflows: Saane/Sarine
- Catchment area: 1,400 km^{2} (540 sq mi)
- Basin countries: Switzerland
- Surface area: 4.25 km^{2} (1.64 sq mi)
- Max. depth: 38 m (125 ft)
- Surface elevation: 532 m (1,745 ft)

Schiffenensee or Lac de Schiffenen is an artificial lake formed by a barrage of the Saane/Sarine river in the canton of Fribourg, Switzerland. The barrages at Schiffenen, Düdingen municipality, were completed in 1963.

Aerial view (1964)

== See also ==
- List of lakes of Switzerland
