= List of Mongolian autonomous administrative divisions of China =

This is a list of specific Mongolian autonomous zones in China except Inner Mongolia. Beside Oirat, these include other Mongolic people such as Santa Mongol, Tsagaan Mongol and Bonan Mongol.

== Mongol Autonomous zones ==
=== Mongol Prefectures ===
- Haixi Mongol and Tibetan Autonomous Prefecture (in Qinghai)
- Bayingolin Mongol Autonomous Prefecture (in Xinjiang)
- Bortala Mongol Autonomous Prefecture (in Xinjiang)

=== Mongol Counties ===
- Weichang Manchu and Mongol Autonomous County (in Hebei)
- Harqin Left Mongol Autonomous County (in Liaoning)
- Fuxin Mongol Autonomous County (in Liaoning)
- Qian Gorlos Mongol Autonomous County (in Jilin)
- Dorbod Mongol Autonomous County (in Heilongjiang)
- Subei Mongol Autonomous County (in Gansu)
- Henan Mongol Autonomous County (in Qinghai)
- Hoboksar Mongol Autonomous County (in Xinjiang)
- Dongxiang Autonomous County (in Gansu)
- Jishishan Bonan, Dongxiang and Salar Autonomous County in (in Gansu)
- Sunan Yugur Autonomous County (in Gansu)
- Datong Hui and Tu Autonomous County (in Qinghai)
- Huzhu Tu Autonomous County (in Qinghai)
- Minhe Hui and Tu Autonomous County (in Gansu)

=== Mongol Ethnic Townships ===
- Xandighati Mongol Ethnic Township (in Xinjiang)
- Jiangqiao Mongol Ethnic Town (in Heilongjiang)
- Kom-Kanas Mongol Ethnic Township (in Xinjiang)
