= Nadun =

Traditional festival of the Monguor people

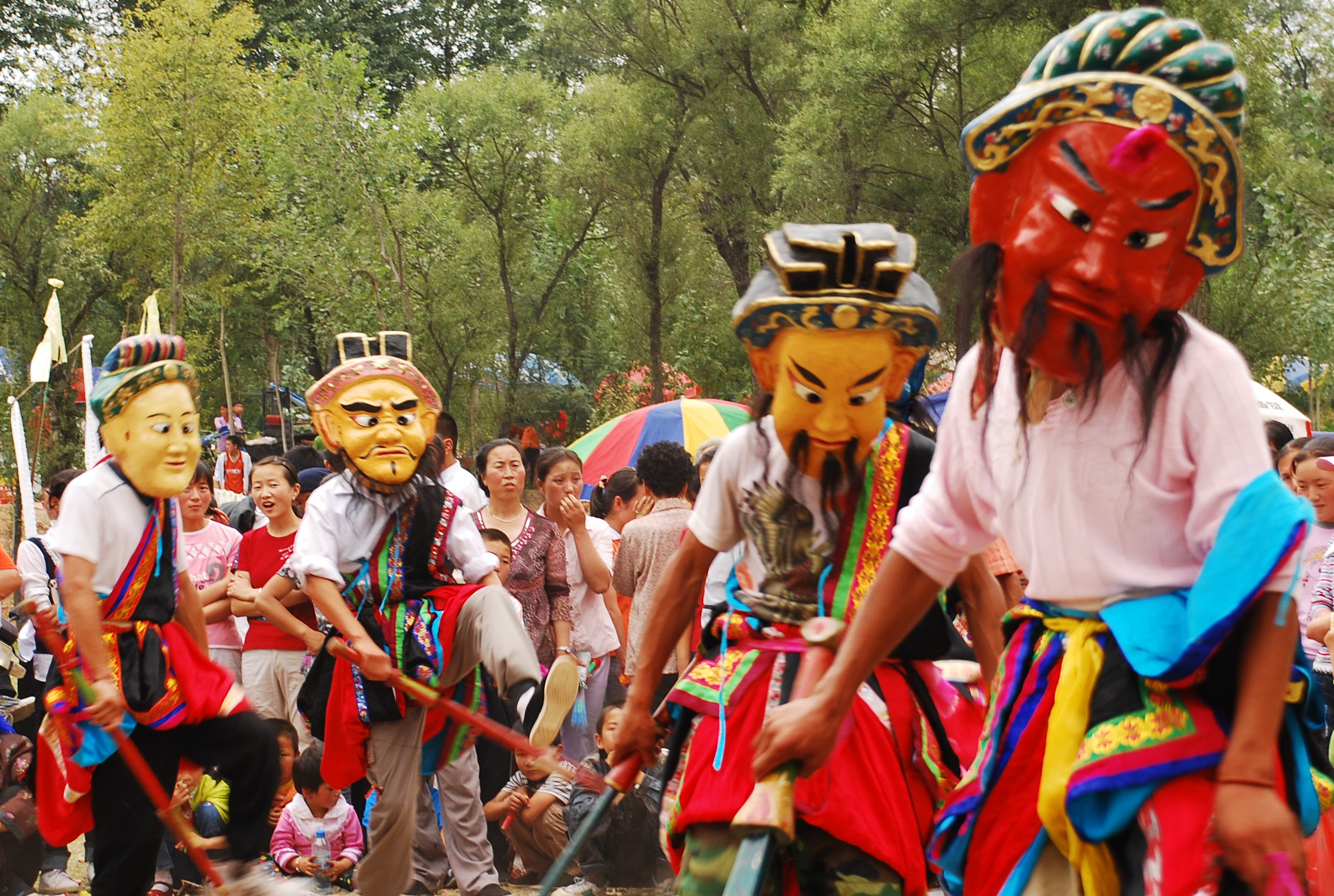
Masked Dance performance of the Xianbei ("Monguor") Nadun.

Nadun is a traditional festival held by the Monguor people (known as the Tu Zu in Chinese). The festival's name resembles the Nadam festival of the Mongols, but different in format and content.

== Origins ==
The Monguor “Nadun” and the Mongolian “Nadam” are special nouns designated to an annual festival and reflect their shared origins from the northern nomadic people, such as the Xianbei, who were recorded to have “one major gathering every spring for leisure and fun”. Whereas the Mongolian Nadam preserved the nomadic features of horse race, wrestling, and archery, the Monguor Nadun has encoded their history through masked dance performances and presents as an annual military drill combined with joyful celebrations of harvest. It is specifically held in the Sanchuan/Guanting area in Minhe County, located on the north bank of the Yellow River, at the easternmost point of Qinghai, as the River flows eastward into Gansu, which holds the most densely populated Monguor settlement today.

== Format ==
Held by villages in turn along the Yellow River, the Nadun celebration circles through the entire Sanchuan/Guanting region in Minhe, the Nadun festival is inherently tied to agricultural work. It functions as the Monguor form of “Thanksgiving” in the Western culture and expresses gratitude for an abundance of harvest blessed by Heaven referred to as “Tiangere.” The event lasts over two months, starting from the twelfth of the seventh month to the fifteenth of the ninth month by the Chinese lunar calendar, and spans for a total of 63 days, giving rise to its eponym as "the world’s longest festival.
