= Yurt wagon =

Traditional Mongolian mobile home

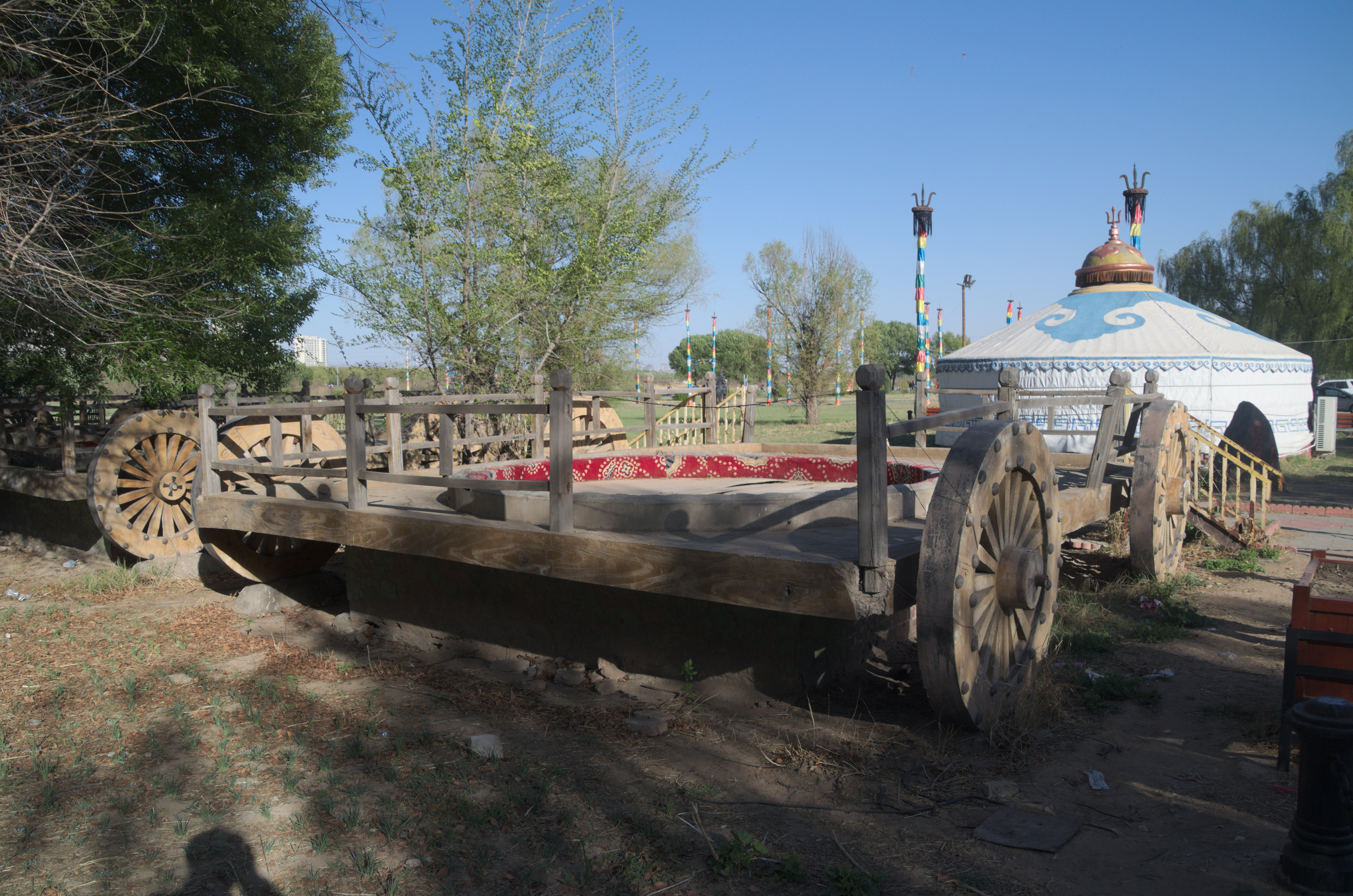
Trolley of a ger tereg in Baotou, Inner Mongolia. You can see the arch that helps maintain the structure of the yurt.

Yurt wagon or Ger tereg (Mongolian: ᠭᠡᠷ ᠲᠡᠷᠭᠡ) is a traditional mobile dwelling of the Mongolic people, in which a yurt is placed on a large cart usually pulled by oxen.

This type of habitat was mainly used by the Mongol Khans, at least between the 13th and 16th centuries.

William of Rubruck (1215-1295) describes them in his travelogues in the Mongol Empire. He describes a meeting in a yurt with Möngke and his wife where they get drunk, during an evening in the presence of Nestorian priests and the woman returns to the imperial yurt, on the cart: "At last the lady, being drunk like the others, returned in her cart to her home".

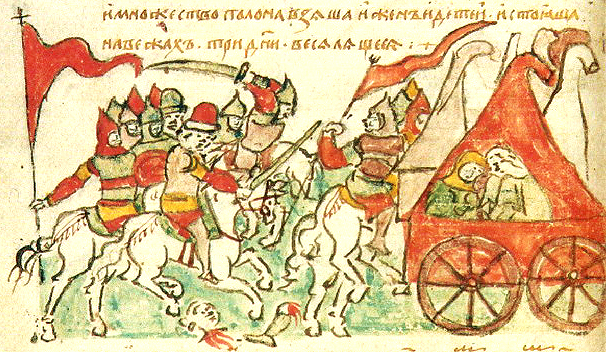
Medieval representation of the Cumans cart yurt
