= Xing'er Township =

Xing'ar Tibetan Township 杏儿藏族乡 ཞིན་ཨར་བོད་རིགས་ཞང་། Xing'er
- Ethnic township
- Xing'erxiang
- Location in Qinghai
- Coordinates: 35°53′1″N 102°42′50″E
- Country: China
- Province: Qinghai
- Prefecture-level city: Haidong
- Autonomous county: Minhe

Area
  - Total: 59.80 km^{2} (23.09 sq mi)

Population (2010)
  - Total: 4,527
  - Density: 75.70/km^{2} (196.1/sq mi)
- Time zone: UTC+8 (China Standard)
- Local dialing code: 972

Xing'ar Tibetan Township (Tibetan: ཞིན་ཨར་བོད་རིགས་ཞང་།, Chinese: 杏儿藏族乡) or Xing'er Township, is an ethnic township in Minhe Hui and Tu Autonomous County, Haidong, Qinghai, China. In 2010, Xing'ar Township had a total population of 4,088: 2,074 males and 2,074 females: 1,057 aged under 14, 2,782 aged between 15 and 65 and 249 aged over 65.
