= Gushan, Qinghai =

Gushan 古鄯镇
- Town
- Gushanzhen
- Location in Qinghai
- Coordinates: 36°7′23″N 102°47′3″E
- Country: China
- Province: Qinghai
- Prefecture-level city: Haidong
- Autonomous county: Minhe

Area
  - Total: 132 km^{2} (51 sq mi)

Population (2018)
  - Total: 23,610
  - Density: 179/km^{2} (463/sq mi)
- Time zone: UTC+8 (China Standard)
- Postal code: 810804
- Local dialing code: 972

Gushan (Chinese: 古鄯镇) is a town in Minhe Hui and Tu Autonomous County, Haidong, Qinghai, China. In 2010, Gushan had a total population of 21,856: 11,523 males and 10,333 females: 4,729 aged under 14, 15,823 aged between 15 and 65 and 1,304 aged over 65.
