= Chuankou, Minhe County =

Chuankou 川口镇
- Town
- Chuankouzhen
- Location in Qinghai province
- Coordinates: 36°19′42″N 102°48′11″E
- Country: China
- Province: Qinghai
- Prefecture-level city: Haidong
- Autonomous county: Minhe

Area
  - Total: 87 km^{2} (34 sq mi)
- Elevation: 1,799 m (5,902 ft)

Population (2018)
  - Total: 81,921
  - Density: 940/km^{2} (2,400/sq mi)
- Time zone: UTC+8 (China Standard)
- Postal code: 810800
- Area code: 0972

Chuankou (Chinese: 川口; pinyin: Chuānkǒu; lit. 'River Mouth') is a town and the county seat of Minhe Hui and Tu Autonomous County, northeastern Qinghai province, Western China, on the border with Yongjing County, Gansu province.
