= Gangou Township, Qinghai =

Gangou Township 甘沟乡
- Township
- Gangouxiang
- Location in Qinghai
- Coordinates: 35°58′40″N 102°46′0″E
- Country: China
- Province: Qinghai
- Prefecture-level city: Haidong
- Autonomous county: Minhe

Area
  - Total: 50.74 km^{2} (19.59 sq mi)

Population (2018)
  - Total: 15,821
  - Density: 311.8/km^{2} (807.6/sq mi)
- Time zone: UTC+8 (China Standard)
- Local dialing code: 972

Gangou Township (Chinese: 甘沟乡) is a township in Minhe Hui and Tu Autonomous County, Haidong, Qinghai, China. In 2010, Gangou Township had a total population of 11,444: 5,851 males and 5,593 females: 2,810 aged under 14, 7,805 aged between 15 and 65 and 829 aged over 65.
