= Mongolic peoples =

East Asian-originated ethnolinguistic groups

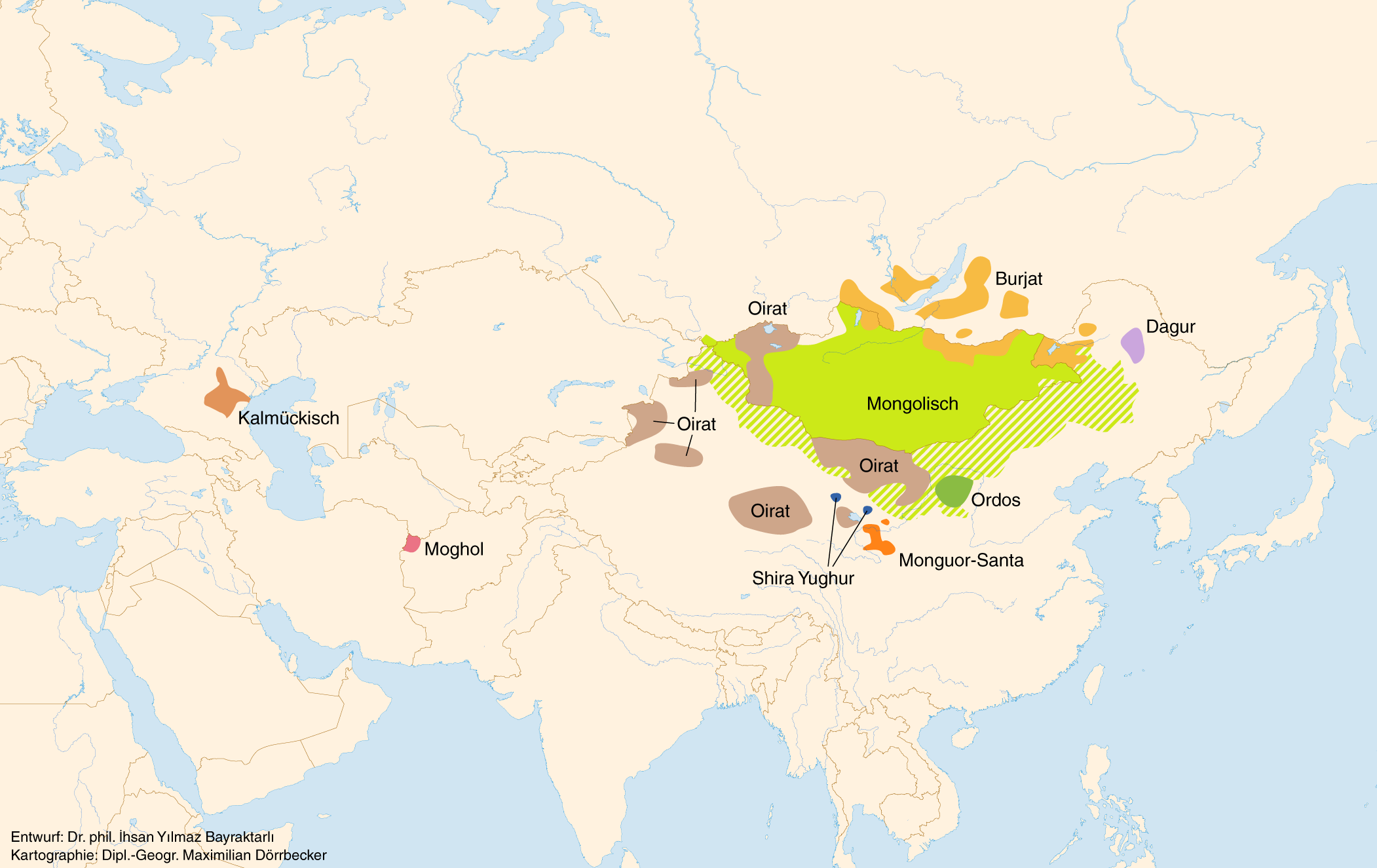
Geographic distribution of the Mongolic languages

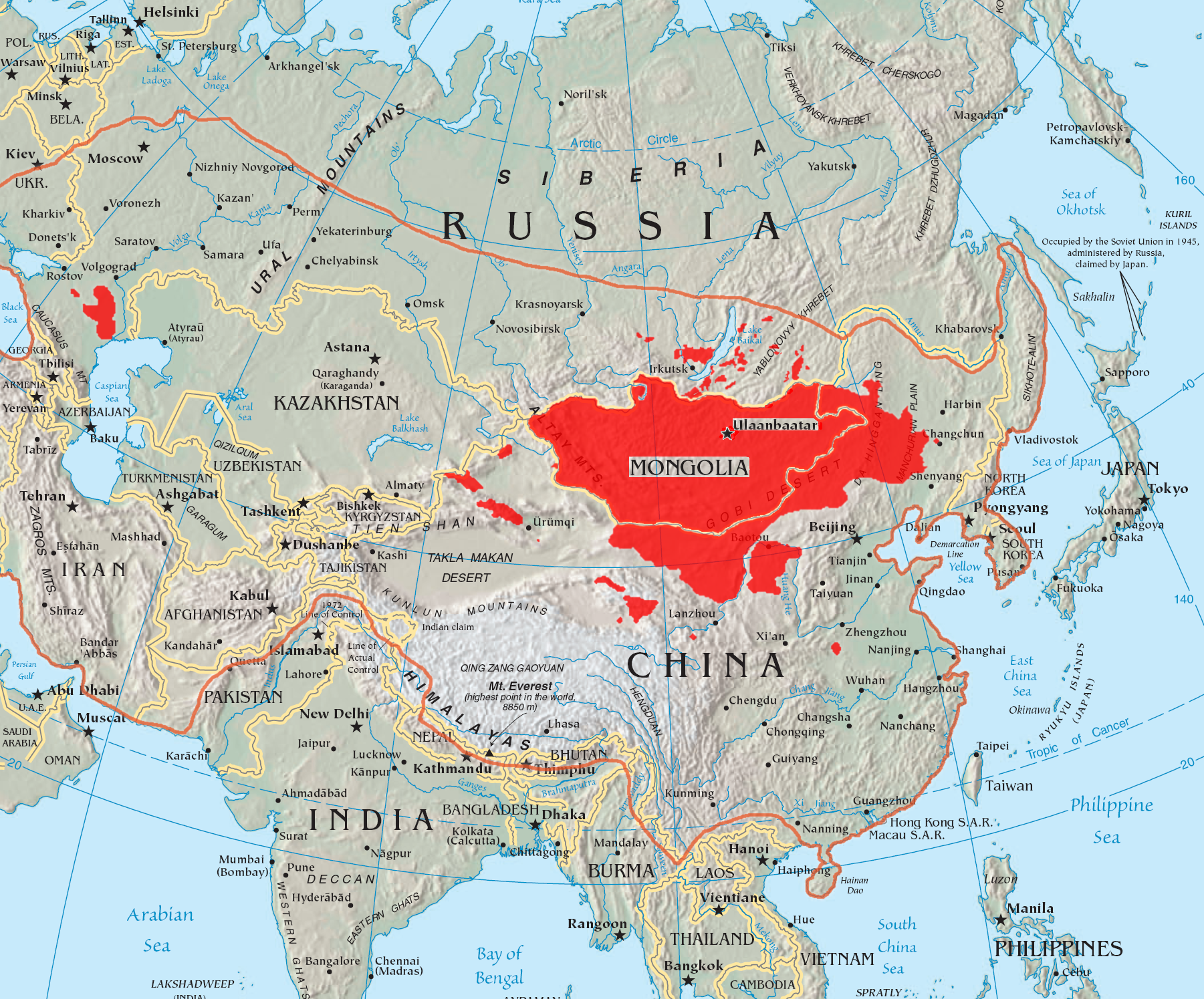
A map of the places that Mongolic peoples live. The orange line shows the extent of the Mongol Empire in the late 13th century. The red areas are the places dominated by the Mongolic groups.

The Mongolic peoples are a collection of East Asian-origin ethnic groups in East Asia, North Asia, and Eastern Europe, who speak Mongolic languages. Their ancestors are referred to as Proto-Mongols. The largest contemporary Mongolic ethnic group is the Mongols. Mongolic-speaking people, although distributed in a wide geographical area, show a high genetic affinity to each other, and display continuity with ancient Northeast Asians.

== List of ethnic groups ==
=== Contemporary ethnic groups ===
Ethnonym	Population	Primary regions	Religion
Mongols	10,000,000	Mongolia, Inner Mongolia (China), various Mongolian autonomous divisions (China)	Tibetan Buddhism, Tengrism (Mongolian shamanism)
Dongxiangs	775,000	Dongxiang Autonomous County, Jishishan Bonan, Dongxiang and Salar Autonomous County (China)	Sunni Islam
Buryats (Note: Some Mongolic ethnic groups are variously described as subgroups of Mongols or as separate ethnic groups; for example, the Buryats and the Kalmyks are recognized as distinct ethnolinguistic groups in Russia (see 2010 Census and other).)	556,000	Buryatia, Agin-Buryat Okrug, Ust-Orda Buryat Okrug (Russia)	Tibetan Buddhism, Orthodox Christianity, Tengrism (Mongolian shamanism)
Monguor	281,928	Qinghai, Gansu (China)	Tibetan Buddhism, Tengrism
Torghut	202,000	Xinjiang (China), Kalmykia (Russia), Khovd (Mongolia)	Tibetan Buddhism, Mongolian shamanism
Kalmyks	c. 200,000	Kalmykia (Russia)	Tibetan Buddhism
Daurs	132,000	Morin Dawa Daur Autonomous Banner, Meilisi Daur District (China)	Tibetan Buddhism, Tengrism (shamanism)
Khatso	c. 60,000	Tonghai County (China)	Tibetan Buddhism
Sogwo Arig	c. 40,000	Qinghai (China)	Tibetan Buddhism, Bon
Sichuan Mongols	29,000	Muli Tibetan Autonomous County, Yanyuan County (China)	Tibetan Buddhism
Bonan	20,000	Jishishan Bonan, Dongxiang and Salar Autonomous County (China)	Sunni Islam, Tibetan Buddhism
Hamnigans	c. 10,000	Zabaykalsky Krai (Russia), Northeastern Mongolia, Hulunbuir (China)	Tibetan Buddhism, shamanism
Sart Kalmyks	12,000	Issyk-Kul Region (Kyrgyzstan)	Sunni Islam
Yugurs	6,000	Sunan Yugur Autonomous County (China)	Tibetan Buddhism, Tengrism
Kangjia	2,000	Huangnan Tibetan Autonomous Prefecture (China)	Sunni Islam
Moghols	2,000	Herat (Afghanistan)	Sunni Islam
Tomao	500	Qinghai, Xinjiang (China)	Sunni Islam
Karyms	2	Buryatia (Russia)	Orthodox Christianity, Tibetan Buddhism
Gurans	?	Zabaykalsky Krai, Buryatia (Russia)	Orthodox Christianity, Tibetan Buddhism

In addition, Mongolized Soyots live in Buryatia. Their population is 3,600 people. Soyots are one of the indigenous minority peoples of Russia. They are descendants of Turkified Samoyeds. At the same time, a number of orientalists (Zhukovskaia, Nanzatov, Baldaev and others) consider modern Soyots as a sub-ethnos within the Buryat people: "... here the ethnic composition of the population was formed, which remains relatively stable to this day - Bulagats, Khongodors, Soyots, who (some earlier, others later) became subethnic groups of the Buryats."

=== Ethnic groups of Mongolian origin ===
Following the collapse of the Mongol Empire, many Mongol elites assimilated into their Turkic subjects, adopting Islam and Turkic culture while retaining Mongol political and legal institutions. This led to the formation of a new Turco-Mongol elite. The Mughals are one group which descend from these elites. They are the descendants of the Barlas (as noted by Sabitov, the Mughals associate their origins with the Barlas tribe) and other Mongol tribes (Rudenko mentions such tribes as the Kauchin, Arlat, Jalair, and Barlas). They currently speak Indo-Aryan languages such as Urdu.

The Mongols took part in the ethnogenesis of the Hazaras. The high frequency of haplogroup C2-M217 is consistent with the purported Mongolian origin of many of the Hazaras. Modern Hazaras speak Hazaragi, one of the dialects of the Dari/Persian language. Same happened to the Aimaq people who purported their descendancy through Borjigin and Barlas clans.

=== Historical ethnic groups ===
- Xiongnu
- Donghu
- Xianbei — founders, in the 1st century CE, of the first Mongolic empire, namely Xianbei state
- Wuhuan
- Rouran
  - Yujiulü
- Duan
- Qara'unas
- Yuwen
- Kumo Xi
- Murong
- Tuyuhun
- Tuoba
- Qifu
- Tufa
- Shiwei
- Didouyu
- Khitan
  - Yelü
- Zubu

== General characteristics ==
=== Languages ===
Languages of the Mongolic peoples belong to the Mongolic language family. The Mongolic languages are a language family spoken in Eastern Europe (Kalmykia), Central Asia, North Asia, and East Asia. The best-known member of this language family, Mongolian, is the primary language of most of the residents of Mongolia and the Mongol residents of Inner Mongolia and Buryatia, with an estimated 5.7+ million speakers.

=== Religions ===
The Mongolic peoples are predominantly followers of Tibetan Buddhism. In 1576, the Gelug Tibetan school which was founded by the half-Mongol Je Tsongkhapa became the state religion of Mongolia. Some groups such as Dongxiangs and Bonan people adopted Sunni Islam, as did Moghols in Afghanistan and Mughals in India. Among a part of the population, the ethnic religion, namely Tengrism (Mongolian shamanism) is preserved. A small number of Christians emerged under the influence of the Russian Church and Western missionaries.

Mongolian shamanism, more broadly called the Mongolian folk religion, or occasionally Tengerism, as refers to the animistic and shamanic indigenous religion that has been practiced in Mongolia and its surrounding areas (including Buryatia and Inner Mongolia), as well as among Daur and other peoples, at least since the age of recorded history. In the earliest known stages, it was intricately tied to all other aspects of social life and to the tribal organization of Mongolian society. Along the way, it has become influenced by and mingled with Buddhism. Tengrism was transformed into a monotheistic religion only at the imperial level within aristocratic circles.

=== Culture ===
The Culture of Mongolia has been heavily influenced by the Mongol nomadic way of life and shows similarities to other East Asian and Central Asian cultures. The various Mongolic ethnic groups share a highly similar culture and traditions, but have specific differences in clothing styles and cuisine. Although Mongolian traditional clothing (deel) has changed little since the days of the empire, there have been some changes in styles which distinguish modern Mongolian dress from historic costume. Each tribe or clan has its own deel design distinguished by cut, color, and trimming. Mongolian cuisine is primarily based on meat and dairy, with some regional variations. The most important public festivals are the Naadam. A Naadam involves horse racing, wrestling, and archery competitions. For families, the most important festival is Tsagaan Sar (Lunar New Year), which is roughly equivalent to the Chinese New Year and usually falls into January or February. Mongolia has a very old musical tradition. Key traditional elements are throat-singing, the Morin Khuur (horse head fiddle) and other string instruments, and several types of songs. Mongolian melodies are typically characterized by pentatonic harmonies and long end notes.

=== Origin ===
The ethnogenesis of Mongolic peoples is largely linked with the expansion of Ancient Northeast Asians. They subsequently came into contact with other groups, notably Sinitic peoples to their South and Western Steppe Herders to their far West. The Mongolians pastoralist lifestyle, may in part be derived from the Western Steppe Herders, but without much geneflow between these two groups, suggesting cultural transmission. Juha Janhunen argues that Mongolic languages originated in Western Manchuria, and split early on from the Para-Mongolic languages such as Khitan and Tabgach when Mongolic speakers (likely the Shiwei recorded in historical annals) spread from their original homeland in the West Liao River basin to Northwestern Manchuria, near the historically-attested Mongol homeland. Furthermore, Altaic peoples including Mongolic speakers were found to have primary Ancient Northeast Asian (ANA) Neolithic ancestry from the Amur region, supporting a theory of their origins from the Amur and surrounding regions.

==== Genetics ====
Mongols and other Mongolic-speaking groups, show high genetic affinity to each other, followed by genetic proximity to Central and East/Southeast Asian peoples. The analysis of 175 Mongolic samples, representing 6 ethnic groups, incorporating results of the 1000 Genomes Project panel, revealed genetic homogeneity between different Mongolic groups, and that Northeast, East, and Southeast Asian populations are closer to each other than to other Eurasian populations.

===== Maternal lineages =====
Mongolic peoples maternal lineages are primarily shared with East Asians (54%) and Southeast Asians (28%), while around 14% are shared with Europeans and other West Eurasian populations. The remaining 4% are distributed throughout Eurasia and not associated with a specific group.

A study based on mtDNA noted that ancient populations in Mongolia had a mixed West and East Eurasian origin, while modern Mongolians are characterized by substantially less West Eurasian maternal ancestry. It is suggested that many West Eurasian mtDNA haplogroups in modern Mongolians are believed to have arrived around 2,500-5,000 years ago, or the Mongolian Bronze Age. A smaller number arrived in the early Iron Age. Research by Rogers, et al. provides evidence that some West Eurasian maternal lineages had made it to Mongolia east of the Altai mountains prior to the Bronze Age. During the medieval period, a continuous increase in East Asian mitochondrial lineages was detected, which these authors attribute to Genghis Khan's Pax Mongolica.

===== Paternal lineages =====
An analysis of the paternal genetic diversity of Mongolians (n=95 from Ulaangom, n=100 from Dalandzadgad, n=97 from Ulaanbaatar, n=84 from Undurkhaan, n=117 from Choibalsan) performed by Toshimichi Yamamoto et alii at the Department of Legal Medicine and Bioethics, Graduate School of Medicine, Nagoya University, Japan revealed a mean frequency of 59.0% Haplogroup C-M217 (49.5% Ulaanbaatar, 57.1% Undurkhaan, 59.0% Choibalsan, 61.0% Dalandzadgad, 68.4% Ulaangom), 13.9% Haplogroup O-M175 (4.2% Ulaangom, 11.0% Dalandzadgad, 13.1% Undurkhaan, 15.4% Choibalsan, 25.8% Ulaanbaatar), 11.3% Haplogroup N-M231 (8.2% Ulaanbaatar, 8.4% Ulaangom, 10.3% Choibalsan, 14.0% Dalandzadgad, 15.5% Undurkhaan), 6.2% Haplogroup R (3.1% Ulaanbaatar, 3.4% Choibalsan, 3.6% Undurkhaan, 7.0% Dalandzadgad, 13.7% Ulaangom), 3.5% Haplogroup D-M174 (1.1% Ulaangom, 3.4% Choibalsan, 4.0% Dalandzadgad, 4.1% Ulaanbaatar, 4.8% Undurkhaan), and 2.8% Haplogroup Q1b (2.0% Dalandzadgad, 2.4% Undurkhaan, 3.1% Ulaanbaatar, 3.2% Ulaangom, 3.4% Choibalsan). The authors noted that "at least 4 major male ancestors with Y-hg-C3 have affected the gene pool of Mongolian males at the different periods," producing star-like clusters of Y-STR haplotypes. Most numerous on average are the members of C3*: 11.6% Ulaangom, 14.4% Ulaanbaatar, 28.6% Undurkhaan, 29.9% Choibalsan, 48.0% Dalandzadgad. Second most numerous on average are the members of Haplogroup C3c: 2.0% Dalandzadgad, 16.7% Undurkhaan, 17.1% Choibalsan, 23.7% Ulaanbaatar, 53.7% Ulaangom. Third most numerous on average are the members of Haplogroup C3d i.e. C-M407: 3.2% Ulaangom, 8.0% Dalandzadgad, 8.5% Choibalsan, 10.7% Undurkhaan, 11.3% Ulaanbaatar.

A study based on ancient DNA and Y-DNA found that ancient populations in the region of modern-day Mongolia had a mixed West and East Eurasian origin during the Xiongnu period. Male-mediated Western Steppe Herders ancestry increased by the establishment of Türkic and Uyghur rule in Mongolia, which was accompanied by an increase in the West Eurasian haplogroups R and J. There was a male-mediated rise in East Asian ancestry in the late medieval Mongolian period, paralleling the increase of haplogroup C2b.

===== Autosomal DNA =====
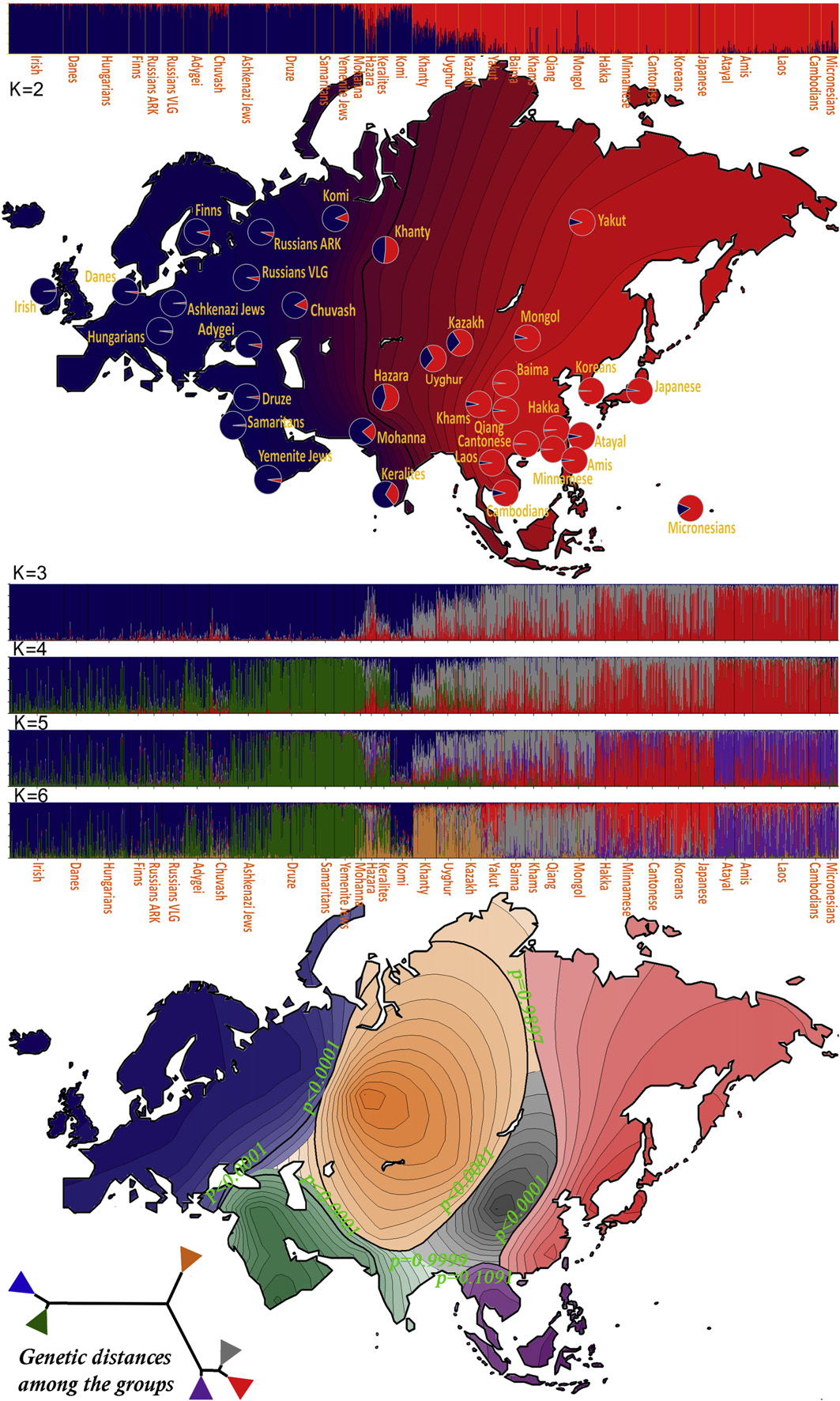
Genetic variation of Eurasian populations showing different frequency of West- and East-Eurasian components.

Genetic studies on Mongolic populations found them to be continuous with Mongol Empire-era individuals. These individuals are a mixture of 55–64% Ancient Northeast Asian (Ulaanzuukh_SlabGrave), 21–27% East Asian (Han) and 15–18% Western Steppe Herder (Sarmatian or Alan) ancestries. Western Mongolians also received 30% of their ancestry from ancient Turkic peoples, with the rest coming from eastern Mongolians, who have more East Eurasian affinities although they also have minor West Eurasian ancestry.

One autosomal study on Oirat-speaking Kalmyks living in Kalmykia, Eastern Europe, found them to be derived from a Western Mongolian source population. Despite their long-distance migration, Kalmyks still display a predominant East Asian genetic profile. Kalmyks derive around 80% East Asian ancestry and 20% Western Eurasian ancestry.

Two autosomal genetic studies on Inner Mongolians found that they are best modeled as a mixture of Ancient Northeast Asian-like (ANA) and 10% to 25% East Asian Yellow River Farmer ancestry sources (increasing among Khorchins to around 62%), with only minor Western Eurasian genetic contributions (5.6–11.6%). (Note: "The gene flow from Western Eurasian was preliminarily detected in Mongol population of TreeMix-based phylogenetic tree; the ancestral source was finally identified in qpAdm, ranging from 5.6 to 11.6% in those Mongolian subgroups; ALDER and GLOBETROTTER supported that the west-east admixture event was recently estimated in the period ranging from Tang Dynasty to Yuan Dynasty. ... We further performed haplotype-based GLOBETROTTER to obtain a high-resolution characterization of the admixture landscaped of three Mongolian subgroups. All targets showed robust signals of west-east admixture (Supplementary Table S11).")

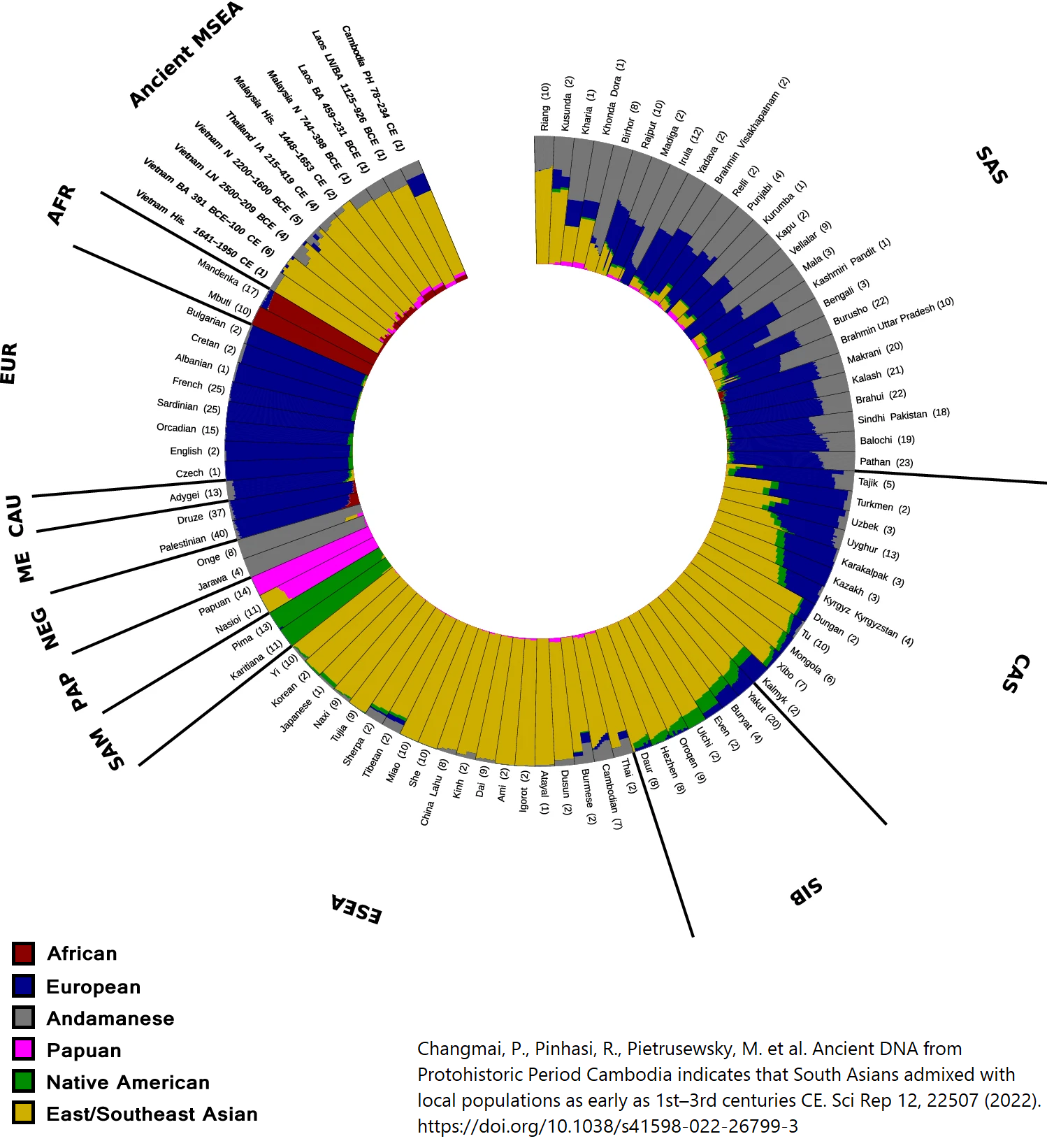
Estimated ancestry components among selected modern populations per Changmai et al. (2022). The Yellow component represents "East and Southeast Asian" (ESEA) ancestries.

Mongolic peoples display genetic continuity to the Devil's Gate Cave specimen (7,000 BP) and the Amur13K specimen (13,000 BP). The Neolithic Northeast Asian ancestry, is shared with other "putative Altaic-speaking peoples" specifically Turkic, and Tungusic-speaking peoples, together with shared "IBD fragments" in haplotype variation, supporting a Northeast Asian origin of these three groups. Turkic and Western Mongolic populations display the relatively highest amounts of West Eurasian admixture, inline with historical contacts between Ancient Northeast Asians and West Eurasian populations of the Eurasian Steppes, and evidence from linguistic borrowings. In comparison, Eastern, Central and Southern Mongolic peoples as well as Tungusic peoples had considerable less West Eurasian ancestry but higher Yellow River ancestry. Sinitic peoples largely lacked any West Eurasian-derived ancestry and displayed primarily affinity with historical Yellow River farmers.
