= Guanting, Minhe County =

Guanting 官亭镇
- Town
- Location within Qinghai
- Coordinates: 35°52′23″N 102°48′44″E
- Country: China
- Province: Qinghai
- Prefecture-level city: Haidong
- Autonomous county: Minhe

Area
  - Total: 86 km^{2} (33 sq mi)
- Elevation: 1,822 m (5,978 ft)

Population (2018)
  - Total: 18,676
  - Density: 220/km^{2} (560/sq mi)
- Time zone: UTC+8 (China Standard)

Guanting (Chinese: 官亭; pinyin: Guāntíng) is a town in eastern Qinghai province, China. It is located in the southeast of Minhe County and, together with Guanting, Zhongchuan, Xiakou, Gangou and Xin'er townships, is referred to as the Guanting Area (官亭地区).

It is the home to the most densely populated Monguor settlement in China, who refer to the area as "Sanchuan" (三川).

== Toponymy ==
The official Chinese name for the area is Guanting (Chinese: 官亭). Local legends accounted that the name came from the famous general, Guan Yu, who stopped by in the area on his way to look for his sworn brother, Liu Bei, the founder of the Shu Han Kingdom (221-263) in the southwest, after having left Cao Cao of the Cao Wei Kingdom (220-265) in China proper. The Chinese name "Guan" in Guanting came from the last name of Guan Yu, whereas "Ting" came from the Chinese character for "stop" (Chinese: 停) or "pavilion" (Chinese: 亭).

The informal reference by the local residents of the Monguor is "Sanchuan" (Chinese: 三川), which literally means "Three Plains" and applies to the Upper, Middle, and Lower plains according to the geographic features marked by two seasonable rivers that flow from the north to the south into the Yellow River and divides the area. The Upper Plain, or Shangchuan, refers to the Zhaomuchuan Village of Guanting Township. The Middle Plain, or Zhongchuan, encloses Zhongchuan Township, which is separated from the Upper Plain by the Zhaomuchuan River. The Lower Plain refers to the Xiakou Township on the exit of the Yellow River that flows out of Qinghai into Gansu.

== History ==
The town is home to the archeological site of Lajia, located in Lajia Village, which belong to the Qijia Culture, as well as the Majiayao Culture and the Xindian Culture. The site's artefacts date back to approximately 2000 BCE, and contain pottery, stone tools, bone tools, jade, a moat, human houses, and human skeletons.

Up until recently, the area has very much existed as an independent kingdom, where everyone spoke their native Monguor language and which enabled the preservation of their culture, characterized by Nadun, elaborate wedding and funeral ceremonies, and rich religious lives.

Archaeological discoveries and historical research hypothesized that the area is the homeland of the legendary Emperor Yü the Great, who established the Xia dynasty (2070 BC – 1600 BC), the first ever recorded dynasty in the ancient Chinese history.

== Administrative divisions ==
Guanting is divided into 1 residential community and 13 administrative villages.

- Guantingzhen Community (Chinese: 官厅镇社区)
- Guanzhong Village (Chinese: 官中村)
- Guanghui Village (Chinese: 光辉村)
- Wushi Village (Chinese: 梧石村)
- Xianfeng Village (Chinese: 先锋村)
- Qianjin Village (Chinese: 前进村)
- Heyan Village (Chinese: 河沿村)
- Zhaomuchuan Village (Chinese: 赵木川村)
- Zhaizi Village (Chinese: 寨子村)
- Baojia Village (Chinese: 鲍家村)
- Lajia Village (Chinese: 喇家村)
- Guanxi Village (Chinese: 官西村)
- Guandong Village (Chinese: 官东村)
- Bieluo Village (Chinese: 别落村)

== Demographics ==
The area is the homeland of the most densely populated Monguor settlement. About three hundred of their villages are densely distributed on the north bank of the Yellow River, which have been administered into about one hundred executive political villages by the Chinese Government.

=== Language ===
The village is home to a unique dialect of the Monguor language.
