= Kelan River =

River in Xinjiang, China

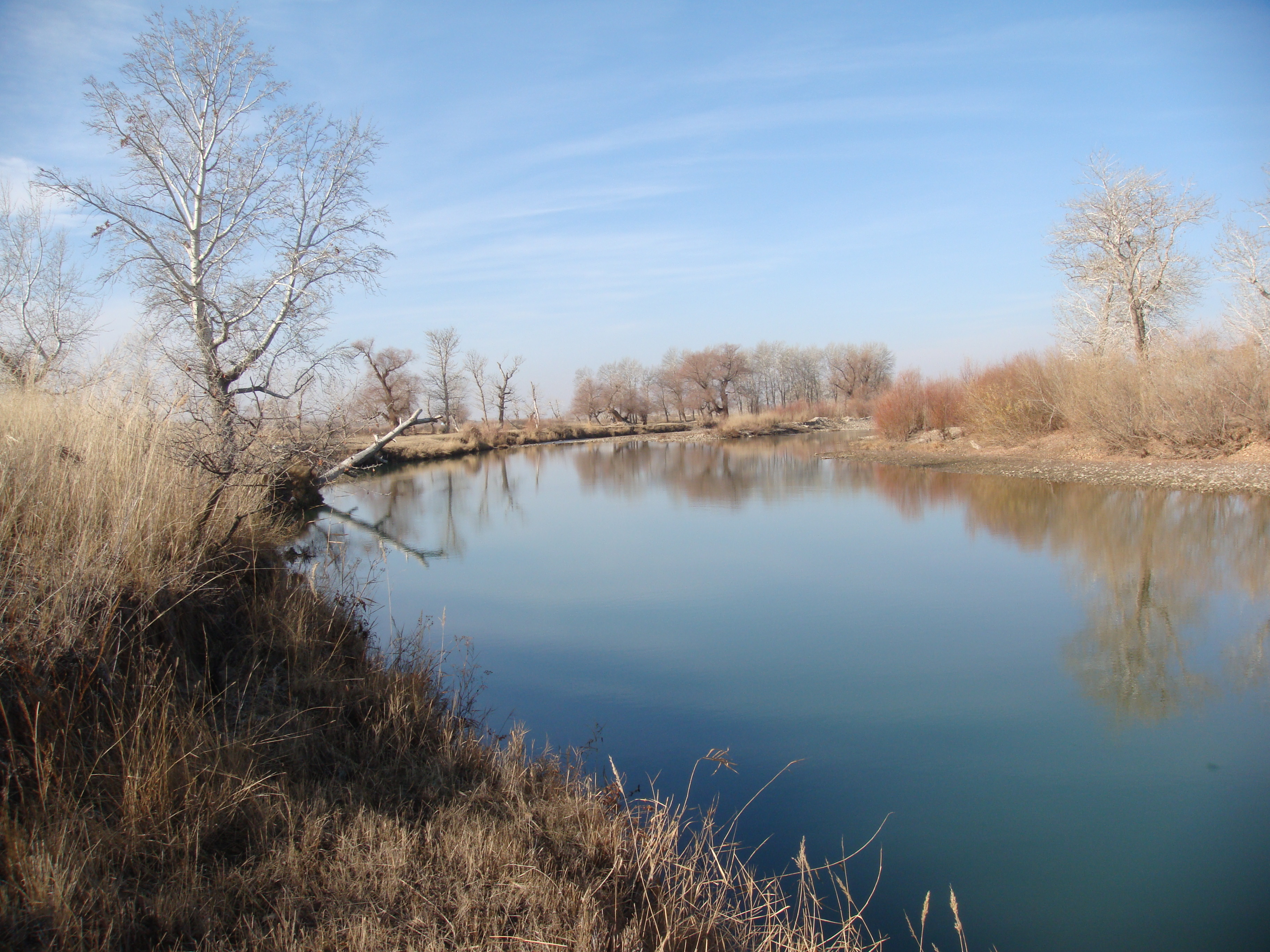
- Native name: قىران دەرياسى (Uyghur); قىران وزەنى (Kazakh); Қыран өзені (Kazakh)

Location
- City: Altay City

Physical characteristics
- Mouth: Irtysh
  - coordinates: 47°36′32.86″N 87°19′6.36″E
- Length: 265 km (165 mi)

Basin features
- Progression: Irtysh→ Ob→ Kara Sea

The Kelan River (Chinese: 克兰河) is a 265-km long river in Altay Prefecture, Xinjiang, China. The river begins on the southern slopes of Altai mountains in Xinjiang near the border with Mongolia. It then flows through the urban centre of Altay City and discharges into the Irtysh, of which it is a major early tributary. It is mostly fed by seasonal melting snow (with snow being responsible for up to 45% of the annual discharge), with precipitation during the summer and groundwater playing secondary roles. Because of the long cold winter in the area, winter precipitation (January to March) exists in the basin in the form of seasonal snow, and after entering the spring, it mainly melts into the river channel from May to June.
