= Altay City =

Altay 阿勒泰市 (Chinese) ئالتاي شەھىرى (Uyghur) التاي قالاسى (Kazakh) ᠠᠯᠲᠠᠢᠬᠣᠲᠠ (Mongolian)
- County-level city
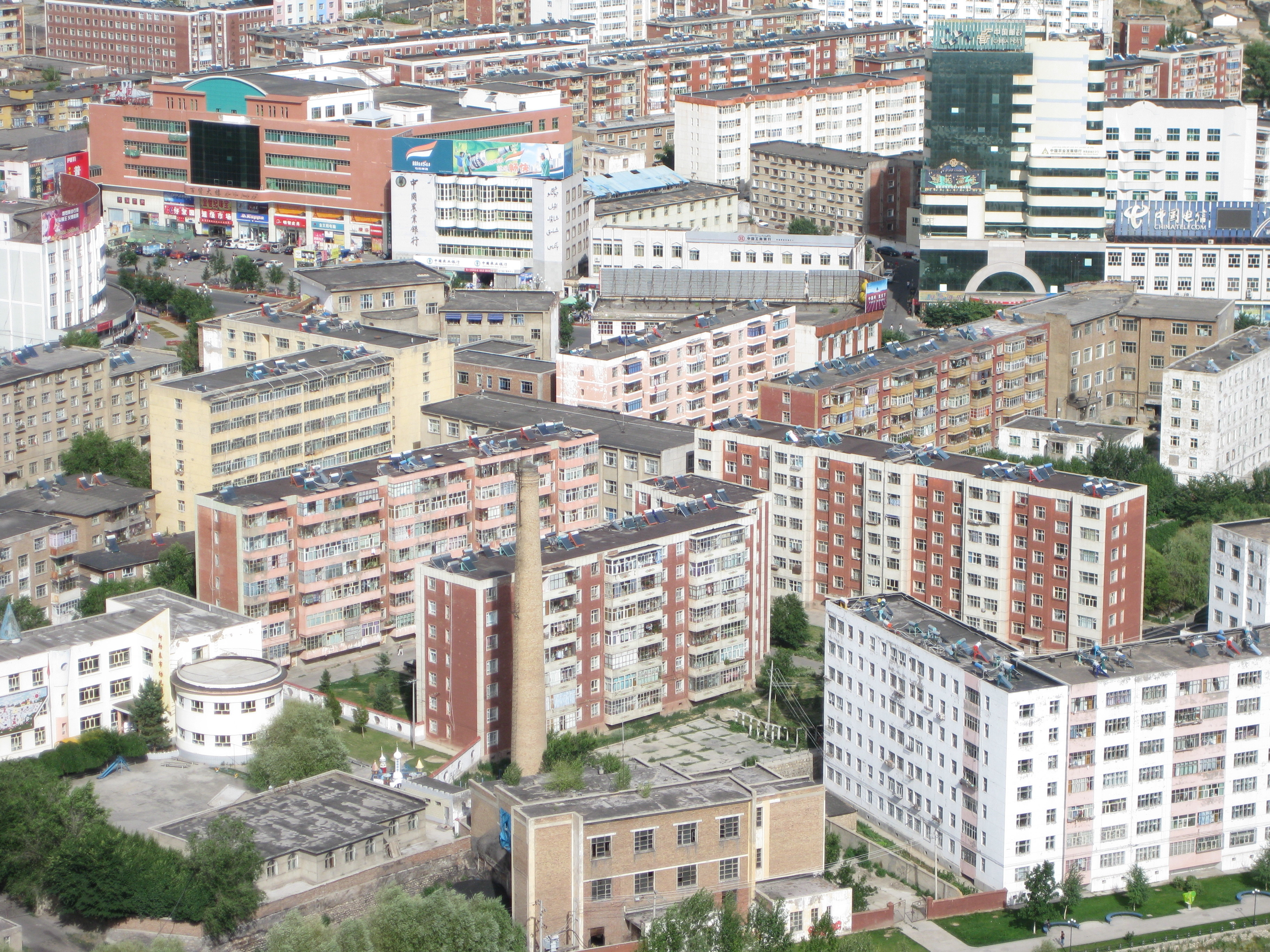
- Altay City skyline in 2008

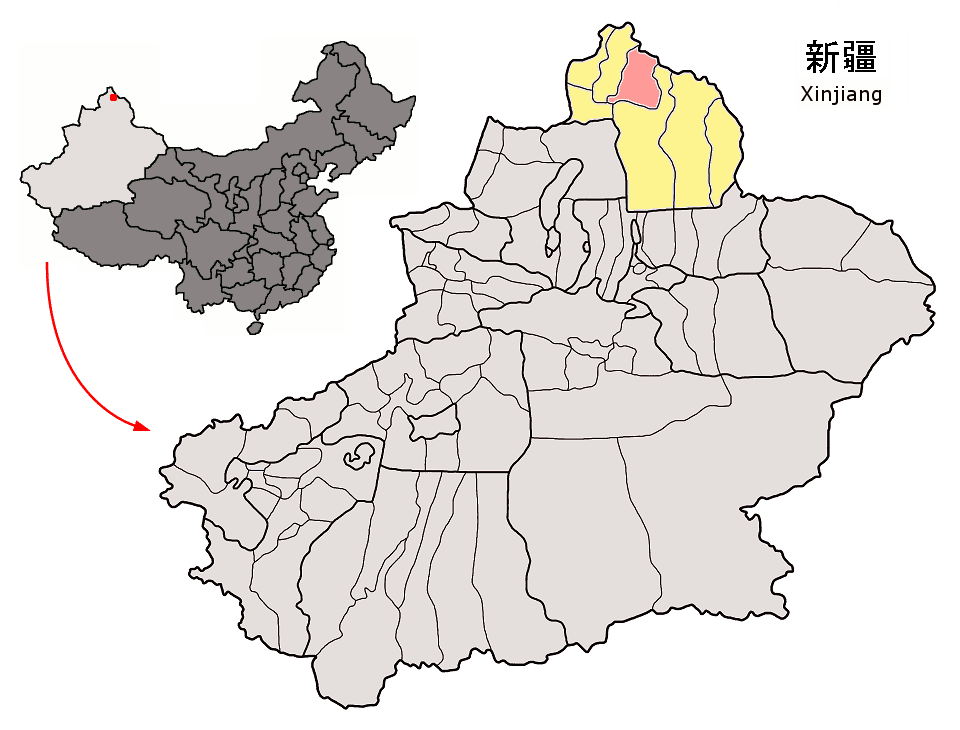

- Location of the city center in Xinjiang Altay (Xinjiang) Altay (China)
- Coordinates (Altay City government): 47°49′37″N 88°07′51″E
- Country: China
- Autonomous region: Xinjiang
- Prefecture: Altay
- Municipal seat: Tuanjie Road Subdistrict

Area
  - County-level city: 11,400 km^{2} (4,400 sq mi)
- Elevation: 887 m (2,910 ft)

Population (2020)
  - County-level city: 221,454
  - Density: 19.4/km^{2} (50.3/sq mi)
  - Urban (2016): 114,995
  - Rural (2016): 83,945
- Time zone: UTC+8 (China Standard (Note: Locals in Xinjiang frequently observe UTC+6 (Xinjiang Time), two hours behind Beijing.))
- Postal code: 836500
- Area code: 0906
- GDP (Nominal): 2016
- Total: ¥6.483 billion US$1.007 billion
- per capita: ¥32.574; US$5.060
- Website: Altay City Government Website

Altay City

Chinese name
- Chinese: 阿勒泰市
Transcriptions
Standard Mandarin
- Hanyu Pinyin: Ālètài Shì
other Mandarin
- Xiao'erjing: ﺁﻟَﺗَﻴْﺷِ
- Dungan: Алетай Шы

Mongolian name
- Mongolian Cyrillic: Алтай хот
- Mongolian script: ᠠᠯᠲᠠᠢᠬᠣᠲᠠ
Transcriptions
- SASM/GNC: Altai ꭓota

Uyghur name
- Uyghur: ئالتاي شەھىرى
Transcriptions
- Latin Yëziqi: Altay Shehiri
- Yengi Yeziⱪ: Altay Shehiri
- SASM/GNC: Altay Sheheri
- Siril Yëziqi: Алтай Шәһири

Kazakh name
- Kazakh: التاي قالاسى; Алтай қаласы Altai qalası

Altay (also spelled Altai or Aletai) is a county-level city in Altay Prefecture within Ili Kazakh Autonomous Prefecture, in far Northern Xinjiang, China. The city centre is located on the banks of Kelan River.

== Administrative divisions ==
Altay City is divided into four subdistricts, five towns, five townships, and one ethnic township.

Name	Simplified Chinese	Hanyu Pinyin	Uyghur (UEY)	Uyghur Latin (ULY)	Kazakh Arabic	Kazakh Cyrillic	Kazakh Latin	Administrative division code	Notes
Subdistricts
Jinshan Road Subdistrict (Altin Taw Road Subdistrict)	金山路街道	Jīnshānlù Jiēdào	ئالتۇنتاغ يولى كوچا باشقارمىسى	Altuntagh yoli kocha bashqarmisi	التىن تاۋ جولى ءمالى باسقارماسى	Алтын Тау жолы мәлі басқармасы	Alty Tau joly mälı basqarmasy	654301001	
Jiefang Road Subdistrict (Azad Road Subdistrict)	解放路街道	Jiěfànglù Jiēdào	ئازاد يولى كوچا باشقارمىسى	Azad yoli kocha bashqarmisi	ازات جولى ءمالى باسقارماسى	Азат жолы мәлі басқармасы	Azat joly mälı basqarmasy	654301002	
Tuanjie Road Subdistrict (Ittipaq Road Subdistrict) (Intimaq Road Subdistrict)	团结路街道	Tuánjiélù Jiēdào	ئىتتىپاق يولى كوچا باشقارمىسى	Ittipaq yoli kocha bashqarmisi	ىنتىماق جولى ءمالى باسقارماسى	Ынтымақ жолы мәлі басқармасы	Yntymaq joly mälı basqarmasy	654301003	
Qiaxiu Road Subdistrict	恰秀路街道	Qiàxiùlù Jiēdào	چاشيۇ يولى كوچا باشقارمىسى	chashyu yoli kocha bashqarmisi	شاشۋ جولى ءمالى باسقارماسى	Шашу жолы мәлі басқармасы	Şaşu joly mälı basqarmasy	654301004	
Towns
Beitun Town	北屯镇	Běitún Zhèn	بېيتۈن بازىرى	bëytün baziri	بەيتۇن قالاشىعى	Бейтұң қалашығы	Beitūñ qalaşyğy	654301100	
Aweitan Town	阿苇滩镇	Āwěitān Zhèn	ئاۋىيتان بازىرى	Awiytan baziri	ءابيتان قالاشىعى	Әбитән қалашығы	Äbitän qalaşyğy	654301101	
Qizil Tash Town (Hongdun Town)	红墩镇	Hóngdūn Zhèn	قىزىل تاش بازىرى	qizil tash baziri	قىزىلتاس قالاشىعى	Қызылтас қалашығы	Qyzyltas qalaşyğy	654301102	
Shemirshek Town	切木尔切克镇	Qièmù'ěrqièkè Zhèn	شەمىرشەك بازىرى (چېمىرچەك بازىرى)	shemirshek baziri (chëmirchek baziri)	شەمىرشەك قالاشىعى	Шеміршек қалашығы	Şemırşek qalaşyğy	654301103	
Alaqaq Town	阿拉哈克镇	Ālāhākè Zhèn	ئالاقاق بازىرى	Alaqaq baziri	الاعاق قالاشىعى	Алағақ қалашығы	Alağaq qalaşyğy	654301104	
Townships
Lasti Township	拉斯特乡	Lāsītè Xiāng	لاستى يېزىسى	lasti yëzisi	لاستى اۋىلى	Ласты ауылы	Lasty auyly	654301203	
Qarashilik Township	喀拉希力克乡	Kālāxīlìkè Xiāng	قارا شىلىك يېزىسى	qara shilik yëzisi	قارا شىلىك اۋىلى	Қара шілік ауылы	Qara şılık auyly	654301204	
Sarxolsun Township	萨尔胡松乡	Sà'ěrhúsōng Xiāng	سارخولسۇن يېزىسى	sarxolsun yëzisi	سارعۋسىن اۋىلى	Сарғусын ауылы	Sarğusyn auyly	654301205	
Balbaghay Township	巴里巴盖乡	Bālǐbāgài Xiāng	بالباغاي يېزىسى	balbaghay yëzisi	بالباعاي اۋىلى	Балбағай ауылы	Balbaşai auyly	654301206	
Shirikshiy Township	切尔克齐乡	Qiè'ěrkèqí Xiāng	چېرىكچى يېزىسى	chërikchi yëzisi	شىرىكشي اۋىلى	Шірікши ауылы	Şırıkşi auyly	654301207	
Ethnic Township
Xandighati Mongol Ethnic Township	汗德尕特蒙古族乡	Hàndégǎtè Ménggǔzú Xiāng	خاندىغاتى موڭغۇل يېزىسى	xandighati mongghul yëzisi	حاندىعاتى موڭعۇل ۇلتتىق اۋىلى	Хандығаты Моңғұл Ұлттық ауылы	Handyğaty Moñğūl Ūlttyq auyly	654301202	(Mongolian) ᠬᠠᠨᠳᠠᠭᠠᠢᠲᠤᠮᠣᠩᠭᠣᠯᠦᠨᠳᠦᠰᠦᠲᠡᠨ ᠦᠰᠢᠶᠠᠩ; Хандгайт монгол үндэстэний шиян

Others

- Qaraghash Ranch (Chinese: 喀拉尕什牧场, Uyghur: قاراغاش چارۋىچىلىق مەيدانى, Kazakh: قاراعاش مال شارۋاشىلىعى الاڭىنداعى)
- Aqtumsiq Ranch (Chinese: 阿克吐木斯克牧场, Uyghur: ئاقتۇمسىق چارۋىچىلىق مەيدانى, Kazakh: اقتۇمسىق مال شارۋاشىلىعى الاڭىنداعى)
- XPCC 181st Regiment (兵团一八一团, Uyghur: 181-تۇەن مەيدانى, Kazakh: 181-تۋان الاڭىنداعى)

== Geography ==
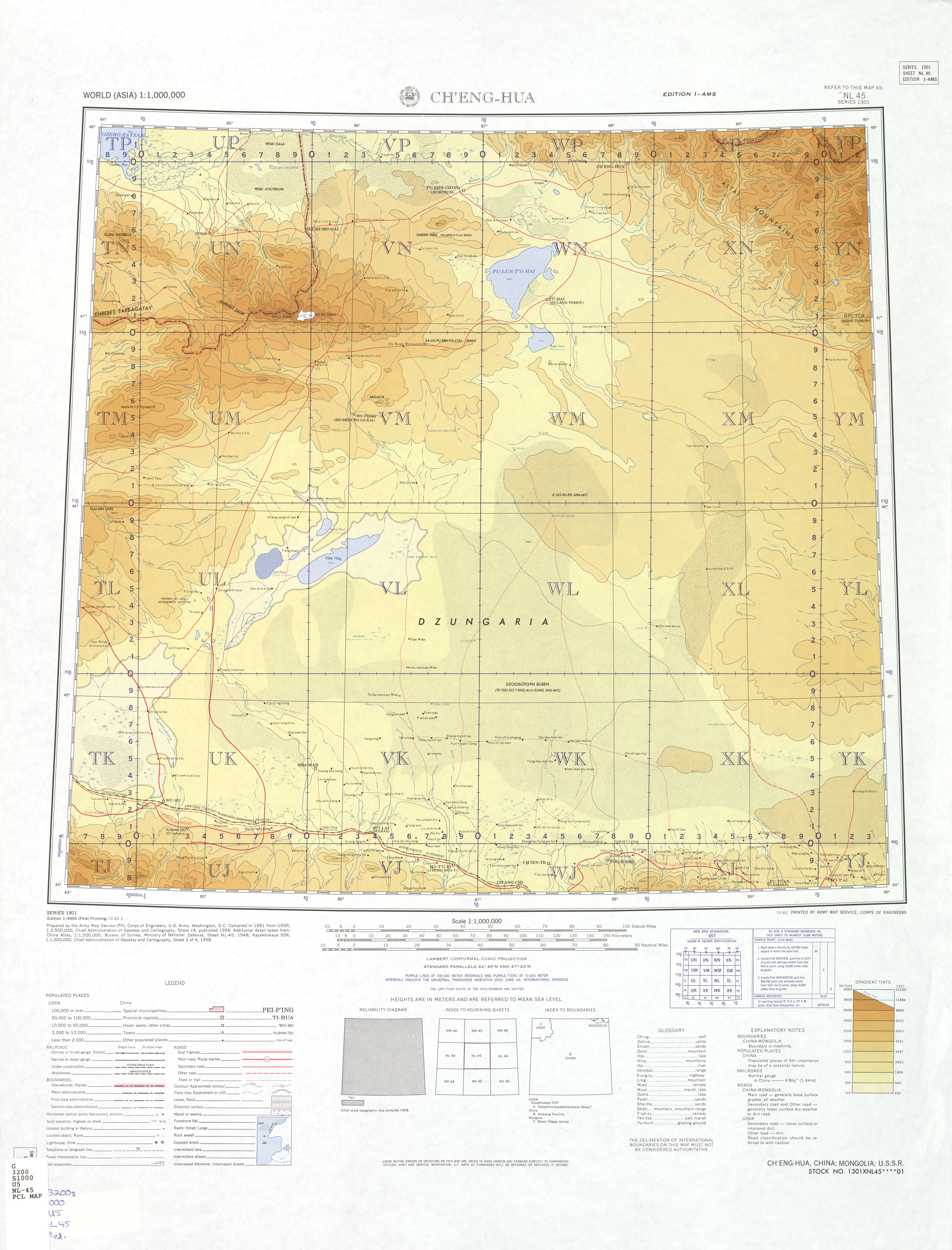
Map of Altay (labeled as CH'ENG-HUA) and surrounding region from the International Map of the World (1961)

=== Climate ===
Altay has a cold semi-arid climate (Köppen BSk), with an annual precipitation total of only 222.5 mm (8.76 in). Winters are long, bitterly cold and dry, with a January 24-hour average of −15.8 °C (3.6 °F); however, the presence of the Altay Mountains to the north helps moderate the severity of winter cold as compared to locations further to the east. Spring and autumn are short but mild. Summers are very warm, but dry, with a July 24-hour average of 21.9 °C (71.4 °F). The annual mean is 4.9 °C (40.8 °F). With monthly percent possible sunshine ranging from 53% in December to 75% in August and September, sunshine is abundant and the city receives 2,985.3 hours of bright sunshine annually.

Climate data for Altay City, elevation 735 m (2,411 ft), (1991–2020 normals, extremes 1938–present)
Month	Jan	Feb	Mar	Apr	May	Jun	Jul	Aug	Sep	Oct	Nov	Dec	Year
Record high °C (°F)	5.3 (41.5)	8.3 (46.9)	23.1 (73.6)	31.4 (88.5)	35.9 (96.6)	37.0 (98.6)	39.5 (103.1)	37.6 (99.7)	35.0 (95.0)	27.7 (81.9)	18.4 (65.1)	6.6 (43.9)	39.5 (103.1)
Mean daily maximum °C (°F)	−9.3 (15.3)	−5.7 (21.7)	2.5 (36.5)	15.3 (59.5)	22.1 (71.8)	27.2 (81.0)	28.5 (83.3)	27.2 (81.0)	21.1 (70.0)	12.6 (54.7)	1.4 (34.5)	−7.0 (19.4)	11.3 (52.4)
Daily mean °C (°F)	−15.8 (3.6)	−12.4 (9.7)	−3.5 (25.7)	9.0 (48.2)	15.7 (60.3)	20.7 (69.3)	21.9 (71.4)	20.1 (68.2)	14.0 (57.2)	6.4 (43.5)	−3.9 (25.0)	−12.8 (9.0)	4.9 (40.9)
Mean daily minimum °C (°F)	−20.9 (−5.6)	−17.8 (0.0)	−8.8 (16.2)	3.2 (37.8)	9.1 (48.4)	13.3 (55.9)	15.1 (59.2)	13.3 (55.9)	7.6 (45.7)	1.4 (34.5)	−8.2 (17.2)	−17.7 (0.1)	−0.9 (30.4)
Record low °C (°F)	−41.2 (−42.2)	−41.5 (−42.7)	−36.4 (−33.5)	−17.3 (0.9)	−4.3 (24.3)	1.9 (35.4)	6.0 (42.8)	0.4 (32.7)	−6.2 (20.8)	−14.9 (5.2)	−40.8 (−41.4)	−43.5 (−46.3)	−43.5 (−46.3)
Average precipitation mm (inches)	18.0 (0.71)	10.4 (0.41)	10.9 (0.43)	15.3 (0.60)	17.2 (0.68)	19.0 (0.75)	27.8 (1.09)	21.5 (0.85)	17.3 (0.68)	15.9 (0.63)	25.4 (1.00)	23.8 (0.94)	222.5 (8.77)
Average precipitation days (≥ 0.1 mm)	8.1	6.9	5.8	6.3	7.1	7.4	7.9	7.0	6.5	6.3	8.6	10.1	88
Average snowy days	10.2	9.6	6.3	1.7	0.3	0	0	0	0.1	1.5	9.4	12.4	51.5
Average relative humidity (%)	72	72	68	48	42	48	56	53	51	56	69	74	59
Mean monthly sunshine hours	164.9	184.1	247.5	282.0	328.1	334.6	335.8	323.1	277.3	219.9	150.8	137.2	2,985.3
Percentage possible sunshine	59	62	66	68	69	70	71	75	75	67	56	53	66
Source: China Meteorological Administration

== Demographics ==
The proportion of nationalities in Altay City, 2018
Nationality	Percentage
Han People	57.7%
Kazakhs	34.5%
Hui People	3.1%
Uyghurs	2.1%
Mongols	1.2%
Others	1.4%
Source of the population statistics :

== Transport ==
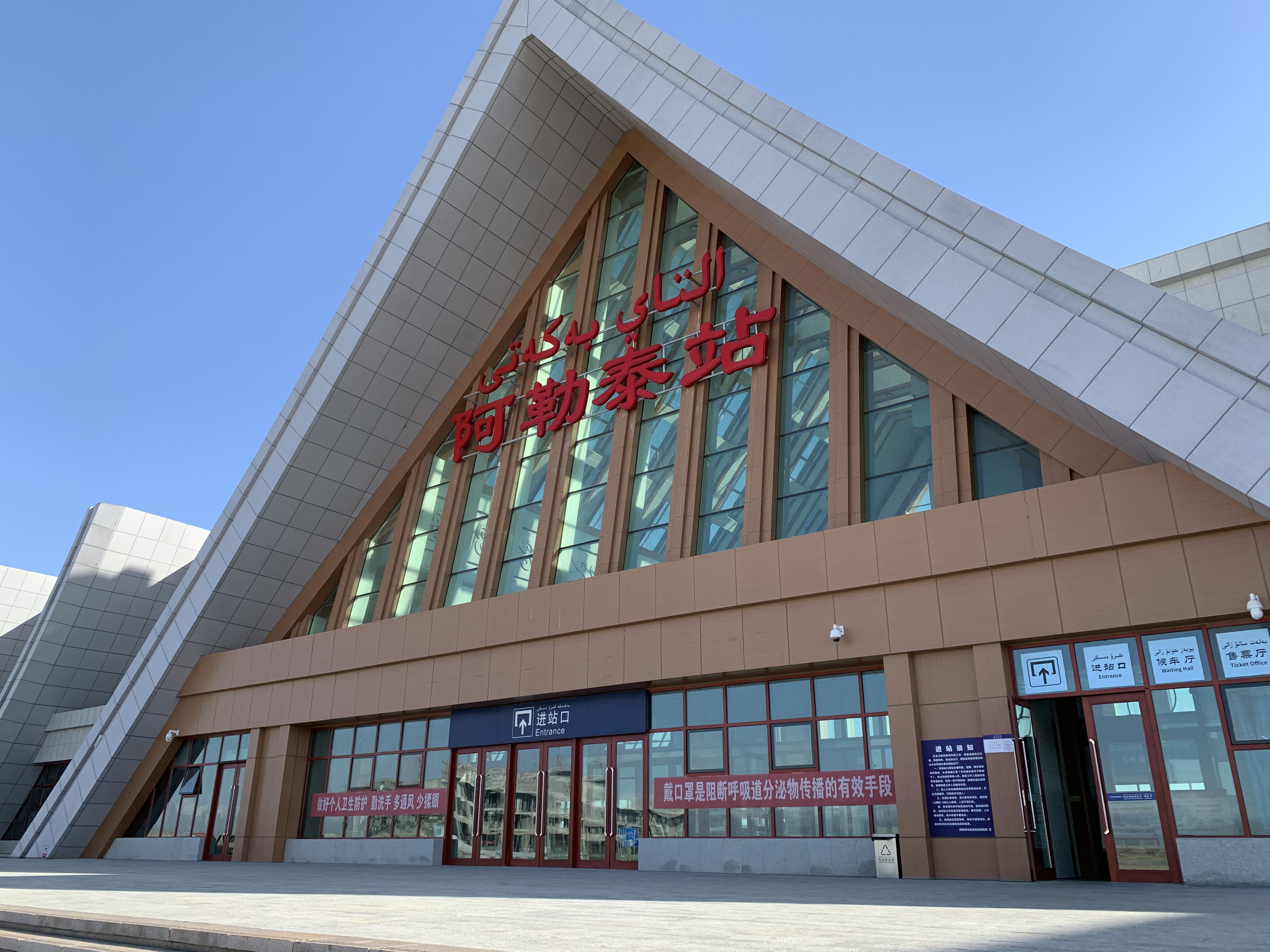
Aletai railway station

- China National Highway 216
- China National Highway 217
- Aletai Xuedu Airport
- Altay railway station

From Ürümqi (capital of Xinjiang Province) to Altay, it takes about one hour by plane, nine hours by day bus, 12 hours by night bus and about 9.5 hours by train.

== Culture ==
Like other cities in Xinjiang Uyghur Autonomous Region, there are many minorities in Altay, in particular Uyghurs and Kazakhs.

The Dundbulag rock carvings (敦德布拉克岩画) in the Xandighati Mongol Ethnic Township (Mongolian: Хандгайт, romanized: ꭓandaɣaitu; Tuvan: Хандагайты, romanized: Handagaity; Uyghur: خاندىغاتى, romanized: Xandighati; Chinese: 汗德尕特; pinyin: Hàndégǎtè) under this city is a very early evidence of skiing. The term Mongol here partially refers to ethnic Tuvans of the Mongol nation under Chinese designation.

== Education ==
In schools, students are taught mainly in Chinese (Mandarin) and there are courses for Uyghur and Kazakh languages.

== Tourism ==
The most important tourist site is Kanas Lake where there is a legend of a large creature.

== Notable people ==
- Ma Fuxiang (1876–1932), military governor of Altay
- Kanat Islam (born 1984), boxer
- Rebiya Kadeer (born 1947), secessionist and political activist
- Dilnigar Ilhamjan (born 2001), skier
