= Gurans (Transbaikal people) =

Slavo-Mongolic people from Transbaikalia

Гураны
- Flag of Zabaykalsky Krai, commonly used by Gurans

Regions with significant populations
- Russia: Zabaykalsky Krai; Buryatia

Languages
- Russian (Guran dialect); Buryat

Religion
- Christianity (Eastern Orthodox), Buddhism

Related ethnic groups
- Buryats, Russians

Gurans (Russian: Гураны) are a Slavo-Mongolic ethnic or subgroup, mainly from Transbaikalia, that formed as a result of mixed marriages between Russians and Buryats (and other indigenous ethnic groups).

== Etymology ==
The term Guran has reportedly been in use since the 18th century. Vernacularly, the term used to refer to a cossack hunter, later it was a nickname of Transbaikal cossacks.

The word gurohn (гуро́хн) means "buck of Siberian roe deer" in Buryat, borrowed into the local Russian vernacular as guran (гурaн). The term, most likely applied to the locals is derived from hats made of guran skin with antlers. Sometimes, it was also used as a nickname for people with mixed backgrounds from Transbaikalia in the Russian Empire.

In modern times the term is associated with the general population of Transbaikalia of local ancestry and metonymically refers to Transbaikalia as a whole.

== History ==
Some researchers, such as Namzhil Tsybikov, consider Gurans to be a new emerged ethnic group, whose members have a specific culture.

Russians, living in the same territory with the indigenous population, often assimilated with them, gradually acquired some anthropological features, borrowed elements of life and culture of these peoples. But, even though they found themselves in new conditions in close contact with other ethnic groups, they did not lose their language. Preserving their cultural appearances in the process of adaptation, they developed new features of the economy, life and culture. In turn, the Russians, having brought and spread among the local population their own skills and techniques, contributed to various developments. Thus, a certain type of local population was gradually formed on the territory of Transbaikalia.

Professor Tsybikov in his work Ethnogenesis and Resistance states:

"In their development, ethnic groups are constantly subject to the process of interpenetration, the consequence of which is either the disappearance of an ethnic group or the formation of a new one. Transbaikalia is a unique region in which this processes can be traced. The time intervals of migration flows of Russians who intermarried with the indigenous populations are clearly defined, resulting in the birth of a new ethnic group, the Gurans."

== Debate ==
Not all researchers agree that the Gurans form an ethnic group. The Encyclopedia of Transbaikalia does not mention the Gurans as a separate ethnic group, but rather "a certain type of local population based on the Buryat, Evenki and mainly Russian ethnic groups." Very often, Guran is also used as a synonym for the term Transbaikalian, instead of a separate ethnic group, with the question of them being an own ethnicity still being open.
