= Bazhou, Qinghai =

Bazhou 巴州镇
- Town
- Bazhouzhen
- Location in Qinghai
- Coordinates: 36°12′36″N 102°45′37″E
- Country: China
- Province: Qinghai
- Prefecture-level city: Haidong
- Autonomous county: Minhe

Area
  - Total: 111.6 km^{2} (43.1 sq mi)

Population (2018)
  - Total: 26,471
  - Density: 237.2/km^{2} (614.3/sq mi)
- Time zone: UTC+8 (China Standard)
- Local dialing code: 972

Bazhou (Chinese: 巴州镇) is a town in Minhe Hui and Tu Autonomous County, Haidong, Qinghai, China. In 2010, Bazhou had a total population of 18,110: 9,129 males and 8,981 females: 4,359 aged under 14, 12,530 aged between 15 and 65 and 1,221 aged over 65.
