= Manping, Qinghai =

Manping 满坪镇
- Town
- Manpingzhen
- Location in Qinghai
- Coordinates: 36°1′27″N 102°46′41″E
- Country: China
- Province: Qinghai
- Prefecture-level city: Haidong
- Autonomous county: Minhe

Area
  - Total: 56.82 km^{2} (21.94 sq mi)

Population (2018)
  - Total: 19,553
  - Density: 344.1/km^{2} (891.3/sq mi)
- Time zone: UTC+8 (China Standard)
- Local dialing code: 972

Manping (Chinese: 满坪镇) is a town in Minhe Hui and Tu Autonomous County, Haidong, Qinghai, China. In 2010, Manping had a total population of 14,362: 7,621 males and 6,741 females: 3,510 aged under 14, 9,934 aged between 15 and 65 and 918 aged over 65.
