= Monguor people =

Mongolic people of Northwest China

Monguor/Tu/Mongghul
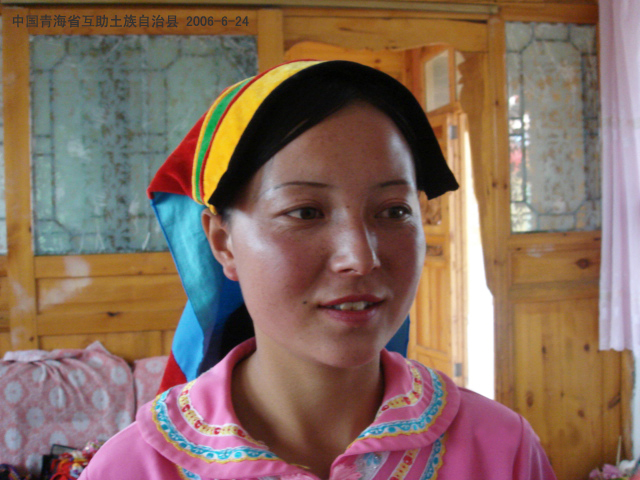
- A Monguor woman in Huzhu County, Xining, Qinghai Province

Total population
- 281,928 (2020 census)

Regions with significant populations
- China: Qinghai and Gansu

Languages
- Monguor, Wutun and Mandarin

Religion
- Predominantly Yellow Sect (or Tibetan) Buddhism, Taoism, and Christianity

Related ethnic groups
- Mongolic peoples

The Monguor people (Monguor: Mongghul), also known as Tu people (Chinese: 土族), White Mongol or Tsagaan Mongol, are a Mongolic people and one of the 56 officially recognized ethnic groups in China.

According to the 2000 census, the total population was 241,198, who mostly lived in the Qinghai and the Gansu provinces. The 2010 census gave their number as 289,565, while the 2020 census gave their number at 281,928. The Monguor people speak the Monguor language, which belongs to the family of Mongolic languages but has been heavily influenced by both the local Chinese and Tibetan dialects. Today, nearly all Tu people also speak Chinese. Most are farmers and some keep livestock.

Their culture and the social organizations have been influenced by Tibetan Buddhism, Confucianism, Taoism and local beliefs. A few Tu in Huzhu and Minhe are Christian, the result of on-going American and Korean missionary work in the area.

== Ethnic origins ==
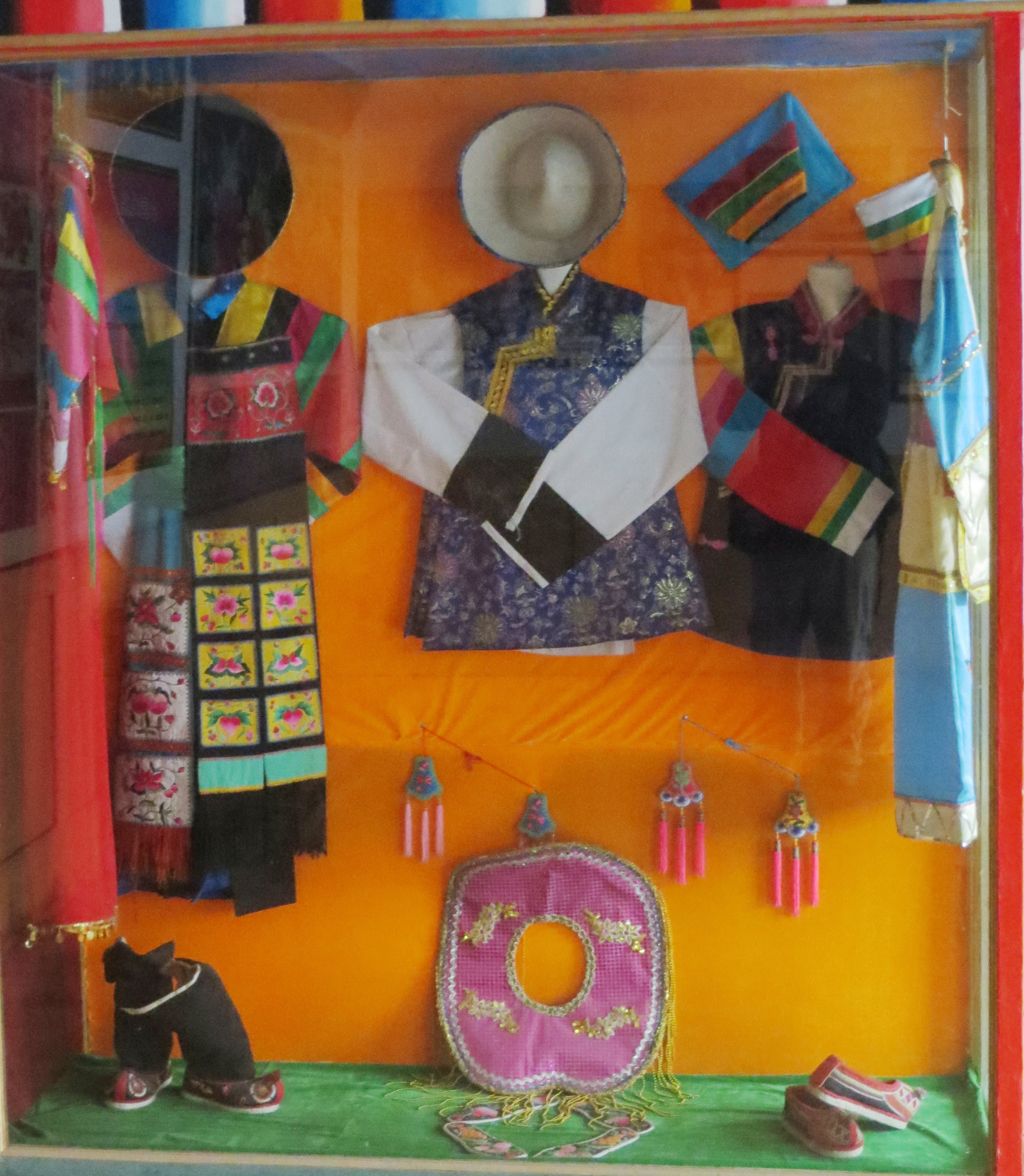
Tu costumes

The ethnic history of the Monguor is contested. It has been variously suggested that their origins are related to the Tuyuhun Xianbei, to Mongol troops who came to the current Qinghai-Gansu area during the time of the Mongol conquests, to the Shatuo and/or to the Han Chinese.

=== Terminology ===
==== Origins ====
Some references argue that the Chinese term "Tu" was derived from the name of Tuyühu Khan, who was the older son of the King of Murong Xianbei who migrated westward from the northeast in 284. The last character of Tuyühu, pronounced as "hun" today, may have been pronounced "hu" in some dialect of ancient Chinese language. The contemporary reference of this name is rendered "Tuyuhun" in China and the West should be "Tuyühu." It came from the Chinese phonetic transcription of his original name "Teihu", which is still a common name seen among the Monguor today. Since the Chinese language cannot represent "Tei," two characters of "Tu" and "yü" were used. The ethnonym "Tu" in Chinese came from the abbreviation of "the Tuyühu people" or "the people of the Tuyühu Empire." Between the years 908 and 1042, the reference became simplified into "Tuhu" and "Tüihu" people. As the other ethnic groups of the Tuyühu Empire came to be ascribed with different ethnonyms through subsequent history, the Xianbei who founded the empire remained to bear with the identity of "Tu."

The name "Tu" was most likely associated with a derogatory meaning and "indigenous people". Its derogatory undertone came from the concurrent meaning of the Chinese character "Tu" for "soil." The ethnonym "Tu" is increasingly a self-reference.

==== Monguor ====
The reference of "Monguor" in the Western publications came from their self-reference as "Chaghan Monguor" (or "White Mongols"). It was derived from their origins from the Murong Xianbei, from whom Tuyühu Khan separated and who had been historically referred to as "the White Section" or "Bai Bu," due to their lighter skin. The term "Monguor" was first used by the European Catholic missionaries, Smedt and Mosaert, who studied the Monguor language and compiled a Monguor-French dictionary in the beginning of the twentieth century. Subsequently, the Flemish Catholic missionary, Louis Schram, made it into an international name through three volumes of extensive reports based on his experiences from having lived among them from 1911 to 1922. The term is a variant pronunciation of "Mongol" in the Monguor language, characterized by the final "-r" in place of "-l" in the Mongolian language.

Despite that "Monguor" was made into an international name for the "Tu," it is not representative: the reference is only used by the Monguor in Huzhu and Datong counties in Qinghai, and when used, it should be combined with "Chaghan" (or "White") in order to be distinguished from the "Khara" (or "Black") Mongols. In Minhe County, which holds the most densely populated "Monguor" settlement and where everyone speaks their native "Monguor" language, it is never used as an autonym.

== Genetic studies ==
Sequences in the DNA of the Tu people indicate that people similar to modern Greeks mixed with a Mongolian population around 1200 BC, contributing about 7,7% to the Tu genepool. The source of this European DNA might have been merchants travelling the Silk Road. This admixture may come from an earlier period as many of their carnival-like festivals and masked fertility rituals have similarities in the Hellenistic times with Dionysian representations, not in Byzantine Christian-era Greek celebrations.

Distribution of Y-chromosome haplogroups in Monguor:

O=38.85(O2=31.42,O1a=4.13,O1b=3.3)

D=14.87

R1=14.05(R1a=13.22,R1b=0.83)

N=11.57

C=9.09

J=5.79

others=5.78

== History ==
=== Donghu ===
Their earliest origins from the Donghu are reflected in their account of the unique wedding ceremony attributed to Madam Lushi, who organized an ambush through an elaborate banquet combined with liquor and singing in order to subdue a bully named "Wang Mang". In historical terms, the "Wang Mang" people were recorded more than four thousand years ago as physically robust and active on the west of the present Liaoning, whose culture was associated with the Hongshan Culture. In archaeological terms, the Hongshan Culture gradually gave rise to the Lower Xiajiadian Culture and represented the transition toward the bronze technology. It eventually evolved into the Upper Xiajidian Culture, which was associated with the Donghu and characterized by the practice of agriculture and animal husbandry supplemented by handicrafts and bronze art. The Donghu was a federation formed from the Donghu, Wuhuan, and Xianbei.

Among the northern ethnic groups, the Donghu was the earliest to evolve into a state of civilization and first developed bronze technology. Through the usage of bronze weaponry and armored cavalry in warfare, they maintained extensive dominance over the Xiongnu on their west. In the end of the third century B.C., the Xiongnu Maodun attacked to destroy the Donghu by surprise and caused disintegration in the federation. The Wuhuan moved to Mt. Wuhuan and engaged in continuous warfare with the Xiongnu on the west and China on the south. The Donghu spoke Mongolic language and was formed by the federation of the Donghu, Wuhuan, and Xianbei.

=== Xianbei ===
As the Wuhuan and Xiongnu came to be worn out from the lengthy battles, the Xianbei preserved their strengths by moving northward to Mt. Xianbei. In the first century, the Xianbei defeated the Wuhuan and northern Xiongnu, and developed into a powerful state under the leadership of their elected Khan, Tanshihuai. In the third century, the Eastern Han dynasty (25–220 BC) disintegrated into three kingdoms, including the Cao Wei (220–265) in the north, the Eastern Wu (222–280) in the south, and the Shu Han (221–263) in the southwest. In 235, the Cao Wei assassinated the last Khan of the Xianbei, Kebineng, and caused disintegration in the Xianbei Kingdom. Thereafter, the Xianbei pushed their way inside the Great Wall of China and established extensive presence in China.

During the Sixteen Kingdoms (304–439) period, the Xianbei founded six kingdoms: the Former Yan (281–370), Western Yan (384–394), Later Yan (383–407), Southern Yan (398–410), Western Qin (385–430) and Southern Liang (397–414). Most of them were unified by the Tuoba Xianbei, who established the Northern Wei (386–535), which was the first of the Northern dynasties (386–581) founded by the Xianbei. In 534, the Northern Wei split into an Eastern Wei (534–550) and a Western Wei (535–556). The former evolved into the Northern Qi (550–577), and the latter into the Northern Zhou (557–581), while the Southern dynasties were pushed to the south of the Yangtze. In 581, the prime minister of Northern Zhou, Yang Jian, usurped the throne and founded the Sui dynasty (581–618) as Emperor Wen of Sui. His son, Emperor Yang of Sui, annihilated the Chen dynasty (557–589) and unified northern and southern China, thereby bringing an end to the Northern and Southern dynasties era. Over the course of this period, the Xianbei who entered into China were immersed among the Chinese and later classified into "Han". Yet, not all branches of the Xianbei shared this fate. In the 3rd and 4th centuries, Tuyühu, a branch of the Murong Xianbei, undertook a westward migration that allowed them and those who followed them to develop in a different path.

=== Westward migration ===
The separation of Tuyühu from the Murong Xianbei occurred during the Western Jin dynasty (265–316), which succeeded the Cao Wei (220–265) in northern China. Legends accounted the separation to be due to a fight between his horses and those of his younger brother, Murong Wei. The actual cause was intense struggle over the Khanate position and disagreement over their future directions. The fraction that supported Murong Wei into the Khanate position aimed at ruling over China, whereas Tuyühu intended to preserve the Xianbei culture and lifestyles. The disagreement resulted in Tuyühu to proclaim as the Khan, or Kehan, and undertook the long westward journey under the title of the Prince of Jin, or Jin Wang, followed by other Xianbei and Wuhuan groups. While passing through western Liaoning and Mt. Bai, more Xianbei groups joined them from the Duan, Yuwen, and Bai sections. At the Hetao Plains near Ordos in Inner Mongolia, Tuyühu Khan led them to reside by Mt. Yin for over thirty years, as the Tuoba Xianbei and Northern Xianbei joined them through political and marriage alliances. After settling down in the northwest, they established the powerful Tuyühu Empire named to his honor as the first Khan who led them there, by subjugating the native peoples who were summarily referred to as the "Qiang" and included more than 100 different and loosely coordinated tribes that did not submit to each other or any authorities.

After Tuyühu Khan departed from the northeast, Murong Wei composed an "Older Brother’s Song," or "the Song of A Gan:" "A Gan" is Chinese transcription of "a ga" for "older brother" in the Xianbei language. The song lamented his sadness and longing for Tuyühu. Legends accounted that Murong Wei often sang it until he died and the song got spread into central and northwest China. The Murong Xianbei whom he had led successively founded the Former Yan (281–370), Western Yan (384–394), Later Yan (383–407), and Southern Yan (398–410). Their territories encompassed, at their height, the present Liaoning, Inner Mongolia, Shandong, Shanxi, Hebei, and Henan, and their capitals included Beijing and other cities. Through these establishments, they were immersed among the Chinese, whereas the Xianbei who followed Tuyühu Khan preserved their language and culture.

==== Mt. Xianbei ====
In the extensive migrations that the Xianbei undertook in the northeast, northern, and northwest China, the name of Mt. Xianbei was found along their trajectories. The earliest recorded Mt. Xianbei was in the southern portions of Daxinganling, located in northeast Inner Mongolia, which represented the originating place of the Xianbei. Two Mt. Xianbei were recorded subsequently in western Liaoning: one in the present Jinzhou City and one near Yi County. Another Mt. Xianbei was recorded in the northern portions of Daxinganling, located near Alihe Town of Oroqin Autonomous Banner in Hulunbeiermeng in the northeastern portion of Inner Mongolia that borders eastern Russia. The Gaxian Cave, currently Khabarovsk and Amur regions in the Russian Far East, which had stone inscriptions of the Northern Wei emperor dated 443, was recognized to be the sacred ancestral shrine of the Xianbei. In the northwest, the Qilian Mountains that run along Gansu and Qinghai provinces were referred to as the Greater Mt. Xianbei. In Sanchuan/Guanting of Minhe County in Qinghai, which holds the most densely populated Monguor settlement, Mt. Xianbei stands in the west, upon which sits the ancestral shrine of the Xianbei Khans.

=== Tuyuhun Empire ===
After Tuyühu Khan died in Linxia, also known as Huozhou, Gansu in 317, his sixty sons inherited to further develop the empire, by annihilating the Western Qin (385–430), which had annexed Southern Liang (396–414) earlier, and Haolian Xia (407–431) kingdoms, from which the Qinghai Xianbei, Tufa Xianbei, Qifu Xianbei and Haolian Xianbei joined them. These Xianbei groups formed the core of the Tuyuhun Empire and numbered about 3.3 million at their peak. They carried out extensive military expeditions westward, reaching as far as Hetian in Xinjiang and the borders of India and Afghanistan, and established a vast empire that encompassed Qinghai, Gansu, Ningxia, northern Sichuan, eastern Shaanxi, southern Xinjiang, and most of Tibet, stretching 1,500 kilometers from the east to the west and 1,000 kilometers from the north to the south. They unified northwest China for the first time in history, developed the southern route of the Silk Road, and promoted cultural exchanges between the eastern and western territories, dominating the northwest for more than three and half centuries until the empire was destroyed by the Tibetans who rose up in 670.

==== Tibet ====
The Xianbei asserted cultural imprint in the region. The English reference for "Tibet" may have come from the Xianbei language for Tibetans "Tiebie," in contrast to the self-reference of the Tibetans as "Bo". The name "Tiebie" may have come from the Tuoba Xianbei who founded the Southern Liang (397–414). The Tuoba established the Northern Wei (386–535) and objected to the Tuoba of Southern Liang using the Chinese characters for "Tufa." They shared Tuoba descent. After the Southern Liang were annexed by the Western Qin, and then annexed by the Tuyühu Empire, the majority of Tufa Xianbei joined the Tuyühu Empire. Some submitted under the Northern Wei in China, while a small fraction went into Tibet and gave rise to the name "Tiebie". In the ancient Chinese records, the reference of Tibet included "Tubo" and "Tufan," which reflected the Chinese transcriptions of "Tuoba" and "Tufa." It is likely that "Tuoba" recorded in the Chinese language may have been pronounced as "Tiebie" originally in the Xianbei language. Among the Monguor settlement in Minhe, Qinghai today, the La and Bao Family Villages were accounted to have descended from "Tiebie", indicating that they have derived their origins from the Tufa (Tuoba) Xianbei of the Southern Liang. The Tibetans refer to the Monguor as "Huo’er," which came from the final word of the name of Tuyühu Khan. The Monguor refer to Tuyühu Khan as "Huozhou didi;" in which "Huozhou" was applied to Linxia, Gansu where Tuyühu Khan died, and "didi" was traditionally a reverence term for a deceased ancestor with deity status. The earliest record of the Monguor in the Western publications was made by the French missionaries, Huc and Gabet, who traveled through northwest China in 1844–46. They used "Dschiahour" to represent the Monguor, based on Tibetan reference, in which "Dschia" was likely abbreviated from the first part of "Chaghan" (or "White") from the self-reference of the Monguor as "Chaghan Monguor" (or "White Mongols"), and "Hour" was a variant record to the Tibetan reference of the Monguor as "Huo’er" used by the Tibetans today.

=== Rise of Tibet ===
In the beginning of the Tang dynasty, the Tuyühu Empire came to a gradual decline and was increasingly caught in the conflict between the Tang and the Tibetan Empire. Because the Tuyühu Empire controlled the crucial trade routes between the east and the west, the Empire became the immediate target of invasion by the Tang. Meanwhile, the Tibetan Empire developed rapidly under the leadership of Songtsen Gampo, who united the Tibetans and expanded northward, directly threatening the Tuyühu Empire. The exile Tuyühu Khan, Dayan, submitted under Tibet, which resorted to an excuse that Tuyühu objected its marriage with the Tang and sent 200,000 troops to attack. The Tuyühu troops retreated to Qinghai, whereas Tibet went eastward to attack the Tangut and reached into southern Gansu. The Tang government was shocked and sent (five ???) troops to fight. Although Tibet withdrew in response, the Tuyühu Empire lost much of its territory in southern Gansu. Meanwhile, the Tuyühu government was split between the pro-Tang and pro-Tibet factions, with the latter becoming increasingly stronger and corroborating with Tibet to bring about an invasion. The Tang sent its famous general, Xue Rengui, to lead 100,000 troops to fight Tibet in Dafeichuan (present Gonghe County in Qinghai). They were annihilated in an ambush by 200,000 troops of Dayan and Tibet, which became the biggest debacle in the Tang history, and formally brought the Tuyühu Empire to an end.

After its fall in 670, the Tuyühu Empire split into an Eastern and Western Kingdom. The Eastern Kingdom existed on the eastern side of the Qilian Mountains and increasingly migrated eastward into central China, whereas the Western Kingdom existed under the leadership of the former exile Khan, Dayan, in Tibet. As the An Lushan Rebellion shook up the Tang court and caused its emperor to flee, Tibet overtook the entire territory of Tuyühu until internal turmoil developed within the Tibetan government and massive revolts brought an end to its rule. Through this period, the Xianbei underwent massive diasporas over a vast territory that stretched from the northwest into central and eastern parts of China, with the greatest concentrations found by Mt. Yin near Ordos. In 946, the Shatuo Turk, Liu Zhiyuan, conspired to murder the highest Xianbei leader, Bai Chengfu, who was reportedly so wealthy that "his horses had silver mangers". With that stolen wealth, which included an abundance of property and thousands of fine horses, Liu established the Later Han (947–950), the shortest dynasty in Chinese history, lasting only four years. The incident took away the central leadership and removed any possibility for the Xianbei to restore the Tuyühu Empire.

=== Western Xia Empire ===
The Western Xia Empire inherited the political and social structures of the Tang and further developed an outstanding civilization characterized as "shining and sparkling". It became the new kingdom for the descendants of the Tuyühu Xianbei who had lost their country. The Western Xia made significant achievements in literature, art, music, architecture, and chemistry. Through effective military organizations that integrated cavalry, chariots, archery, shields, artillery (cannons carried on the back of camels), and amphibious troops for combats on the land and water, the Xia army maintained a powerful stance in opposition to the Song, Liao (916–1125), and Jin (1115–1234) empires to its east, the last of which was founded by the Jurchens, who were the predecessors of the Manchus who would found the Qing dynasty (1644–1912). The Xia territory encompassed the present Ningxia, Gansu, eastern Qinghai, northern Shaanxi, northeastern Xinjiang, southwest Inner Mongolia, and southernmost Outer Mongolia, spanning about 800,000 square kilometers. In the beginning of the thirteenth century, Genghis Khan unified the northern grasslands of Mongolia and led the Mongol troops to carry out six rounds of attacks against Western Xia over a period of twenty-two years. As Western Xia resisted vehemently, more and more of its people crossed the Qilian Mountains to join the earlier establishments in Qinghai and Gansu in order to avoid the Mongol assaults, which gave rise to the current settlements of the Monguor. During the last round of attacks, Genghis Khan died in Western Xia. The official Mongol historical account attributed his death to an illness, whereas legends told that he died from a wound inflicted in the battles. After the Xia capital was overrun in 1227, the Mongols destroyed much of hu its architecture and written records, killing the last emperor and massacring tens of thousands of civilians. The Xia troops were later incorporated into the Mongol army in their subsequent military conquests in central and southern China. Due to the fierce resistance of the Xia against the Mongol attacks, especially in causing the death of Genghis, they were initially suppressed in the Yuan dynasty (1271–1368). Toward the middle and later stages of the Yuan, the Xia received equivalent treatment to the ruling Mongols and attained the highest offices in the Central Court. After the Yuan fell, the Xia who followed the Mongols into the northern grassland were immersed among and later classified into the "Mongols."

==== Tangut-Xixia ====
The English reference of "Tangut-Xixia" was derived from the combination of the Mongolian reference of "Tangut" and the Chinese reference as "Xixia" or "Western Xia." The Chinese reference was derived from the location of the empire on the western side of the Yellow River, in contrast to the Liao (916–1125) and Jin on its east. The Mongolian usage of "Tangut" most likely referred to the "Donghu people;" "-t" in Mongolian language means "people". Whereas "Donghu" was a Chinese transcription, its Mongolian reference was "Tünghu". By the time that the Mongols emerged in the thirteenth century, the only "Donghu people" who existed were the "Tu" in Western Xia.

That the Mongols referred to Western Xia as "Tangut" to represent the founding ethnic group, the Tuyühu Xianbei, is consistent with the theories of the Mongol origins postulated by the Outer Mongolian scholars, who have held that the Mongols had descended from the Xiongnu, more specifically the eastern Xiongnu who spoke proto-Mongolic language, as opposed to the western Xiongnu who spoke proto-Turkish language. In contrast, the Chinese scholars have characterized that the Mongols had descended from the Xianbei. The Mongols were recorded as "Mengwu Shiwei" in the Northern dynasties: "Mengwu" was a variant Chinese transcription of "Menggu" designated to the Mongols, and "Shiwei" was a variant transcription of the Xianbei, as "Xianbei" was also recorded as "Sian-pie," "Serbi," "Sirbi" and "Sirvi". This equated the Mongols to be "Mongol Xianbei," which was likely associated with the submission of the Xiongnu under Xianbei. In 87 A.D., the Xianbei defeated the northern Xiongnu and killed their king, Chanyu Youliu, causing its thorough disintegration. Thereafter, the Xiongnu submitted under and self-proclaimed to be Xianbei. This resulted in a mix of the Xiongnu into Xianbei and made it difficult to differentiate the two groups in subsequent historical records. That the Mongolian term "Tangut" represented "the Donghu people," the Xianbei and their descendants who had founded the Tuyühu and Western Xia empires, would validate the theories of the Outer Mongolian scholars that the Mongols had descended from the Xiongnu. The fact that there were Wuhuan groups, who were part of the Donghu federation and followed Tuyühu Khan in the westward migration, would make the interpretation that "Tangut" represented "the Donghu people" stronger, not only from reflecting that the Wuhuan joined the Xianbei in the Tuyühu and Western Xia empires, but also contrasting that the Mongols had descended from the Xiongnu. If the Mongols had descended from the Xianbei, as the Chinese scholars characterized, the Mongols would have shared the same ethnic origins with the Xianbei of the Tuyühu Empire and not have called them as "the Donghu people" in reference of Western Xia. While the intimate associations between the two groups were manifested in the cross references of the Mongols as "Mengwu Shiwei" (or "Mongol Xianbei") from the first century and the Monguor as "Chaghan (or White) Monguor" in the thirteenth century, ethnically and culturally they remained different. As much as the prefix "Mengwu" (or "Mongol") in front of "Shiwei" (or "Xianbei") marked the difference between the Mongols and the Xianbei, the prefix "Chaghan" in front of "Monguor" indicated that the Monguor and their Xianbei predecessors were not the same as the Mongols. Culturally, the Mongols have retained a nomadic lifestyle, whereas the social organizations and religious lives of the Monguor are of far greater complexities.

==== Mongols, Khitans, and Jurchens ====
When the Mongols emerged as a mighty power in the thirteenth century, a reverse occurred in the ethnonyms of the Xianbei and Mongols. This was represented in the reference of the Xianbei descendants as "Chaghan Monguor" (or "White Mongols"), which gave rise to the ethnonym of "Monguor" known in the Western publications. The term "White Mongols," or "Bai Menggu," first occurred when Genghis Khan united the Mongols to rise up in Mongolia in 1206. The Xianbei descendants who resided near Mt. Yin self-proclaimed to be "White Mongols" and joined them. They received the same treatment as the Mongols and partook in their westward conquests in Central Asia and Europe.

As waves and waves of the Xianbei went south and westward to establish different empires, those who remained in the northeast emerged as major powers later to rule over China. While the "Mongol Xianbei" (or "Mengwu Shiwei") emerged from the northern Manchuria and northeastern Mongolia, the Khitans, or "Qidan" in Chinese, derived their ancestral origins from the Yuwen Xianbei in southern Mongolia, who had earlier founded the Western Wei (535–556) and Northern Zhou (557–581) of the Northern dynasties. When the Khitans established the Liao dynasty (916–1125) in China proper, they were referred to as "Qara (or Black) Khitāy". Their rule gave rise to the reference of China known as "Hătāi" and "Cathay" in the Persian and European countries. The reference of "Qara" (or "Black") as a prefix in the name of the Khitans and "Khara" (or "Black") in that of the Mongols may indicate that both groups had substantial input from the Xiongnu, who by self proclaiming to be "Xianbei" earlier made it hard in distinguish in the Chinese records.

After the Xianbei vacated from the northeast, the Jurchens, known as "Nüzhen" in Chinese, moved southward into Manchuria from their original habitation in the Tungus Plains in eastern Russia located on the north of Manchuria. They occupied the former areas of the Xianbei and renamed the Xianbei Mountains (鮮卑山) to "Daxinganling," which remains in use today and literally meant "White Mountains" in their Tungus language. They first established the Jin dynasty (1115–1234) in northern China by pushing the Liao Empire of the Khitans westward into Xinjiang. After the Jin Empire was destroyed by the Mongols in 1234, they withdrew back to Manchuria and returned later with the rejoined forces from the Mongols to establish the last dynasty of the Qing (1644–1912) in China under the new ethnonym of Manchu, or "Man Zu" in Chinese.

==== Xia title ====
The full national title of Western Xia was "the Great Xia Kingdom of the White and Mighty," or "Bai Gao Da Xia Guo" (白高大夏国). The term "White" (or "Bai") was designated to the founding ethnic group, the Xianbei descendants of the Tuyühu Empire, which is consistent with their reference of "Chaghan" (or "White"), derived from their origins from the Murong Xianbei known as the "White Section." The term "Mighty" (or "Gao") was designated to the "Qiang" people who formed the majority of the population. The "Qiang" were the native peoples who were subjugated by the Xianbei in the northwest. They initially rebelled but later their fate became intimately associated with the Xianbei, as they actively defended the empire when the enemies attacked. In addition to the Tibetans and authentic Han people, the "Qiang" comprised a portion of the Miao/Hmong who were relocated to the northwest from central China after their Three Miao Kingdom was destroyed by the legendary Chinese Emperor Yü the Great about four thousand years ago. The "Qiang" referred to Western Xia as their "Gao (or ‘Mighty’) Mi Yao" Kingdom. When "Mi Yao" is pronounced together, it is similar to "Miao." Since the autonyms of the Miao/Hmong include "Guoxiong", "Gaoxiong," and "Gouxiong," the character "Gao" (or "Mighty") in the Xia national title could have derived as a variant abbreviation. "Bai Gao" in the national title was in turn used it to refer to the Yellow River, which had traditionally been referred to as the "Mother River" of China, known as "Mu Qin He," that has nurtured their homeland.

=== Current status ===
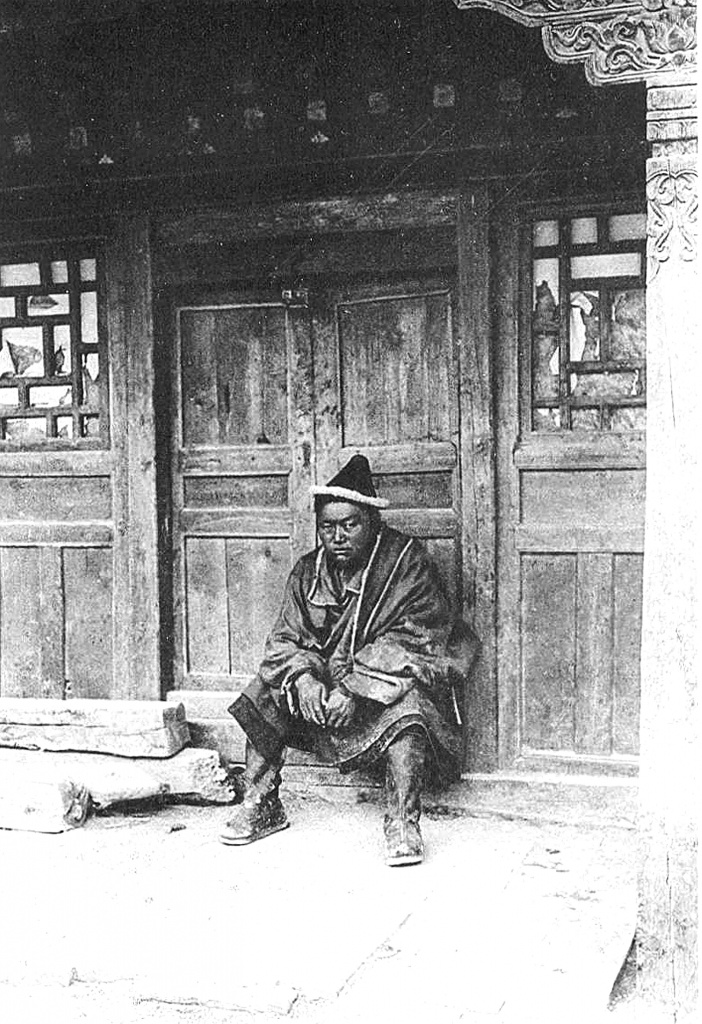
Mongour in 1901

The Flemish Catholic missionary, Schram, who wrote about the Monguor based on residence in the current Qinghai Province in the early twentieth century, cited Comte de Lesdain, who characterized the Monguor as "the most authentic reminder of the primitive race from which the Chinese sprung." This characterization reflected that the Monguor culture under their observation has embodied "a high civilization fortified by its own history and distinctive social structure" developed by the Xianbei forefathers from their extensive rulings over China and preserved by the "Monguor"/"Tu". As early as the Tuyühu period, Confucianism served as the core ideology to govern the country, and the Chinese Buddhism and Shamanism functioned as the principle religions. In Western Xia, Confucianism was further strengthened, and Taoism was made into the national religion along with Buddhism. As the Yellow Sect of Buddhism, also known as the Tibetan Buddhism, became prevalent in the northwest, their religious lives shifted from the Chinese toward Tibetan Buddhism. After Western Xia fell, its territory centered in Ningxia was fragmented by the successive establishments of Shaanxi, Gansu, and Qinghai provinces, which increasingly weakened the political and military powers of the Monguor. Through the Ming (1368–1644) and Qing (1644–1912) dynasties, the Monguor continued to play important roles in the national defense, and political and religious affairs of China. Starting in the middle of the Ming dynasty, the ranches of the Monguor were taken into the state possession, and their horses became the subject of being drafted into the national army and looted by the Mongols from the north, resulting in the eventual shift of their lifestyles toward sedentary agriculture, supplemented by minimum animal husbandry, as the original Monguor groups became settled into the form of different villages. In the last two centuries, the areas formerly occupied by the Monguor were encroached upon by increasing inland Chinese migrations. Throughout this period, the Monguor maintained a high degree of political autonomy and self governance under the local chiefdom system of Tusi. The Monguor troops led by their Tusi defended not only their own homeland but also joined the national army to participate in wars that took place as far as in eastern Liaoning, Shaanxi, Shanxi, Yunnan, Mongolia, and Dunhuang, which progressively weakened their military power. Their political power came to the ultimate decline when the Tusi system was abolished in 1931, which exacerbated more Monguor to lose their language. By the founding of the People's Republic of China in 1949, only about fifty thousand of the Monguor have maintained to speak their language, primarily in Qinghai and Gansu. During the Chinese classificatory campaigns carried out in the 1950s, those who could no longer speak their language were classified into "Han", those who could not speak their language but adopted the Islamic religion were classified into "Hui", those who followed the Mongols into the northern grassland were classified into "Mongols", and those who spoke their language and adopted the Islamic religion were classified into "Dongxiang", "Bonan" and "Yugur", the last of which represented the intermixture of the Xianbei and Sari Uyghurs.

== Culture ==
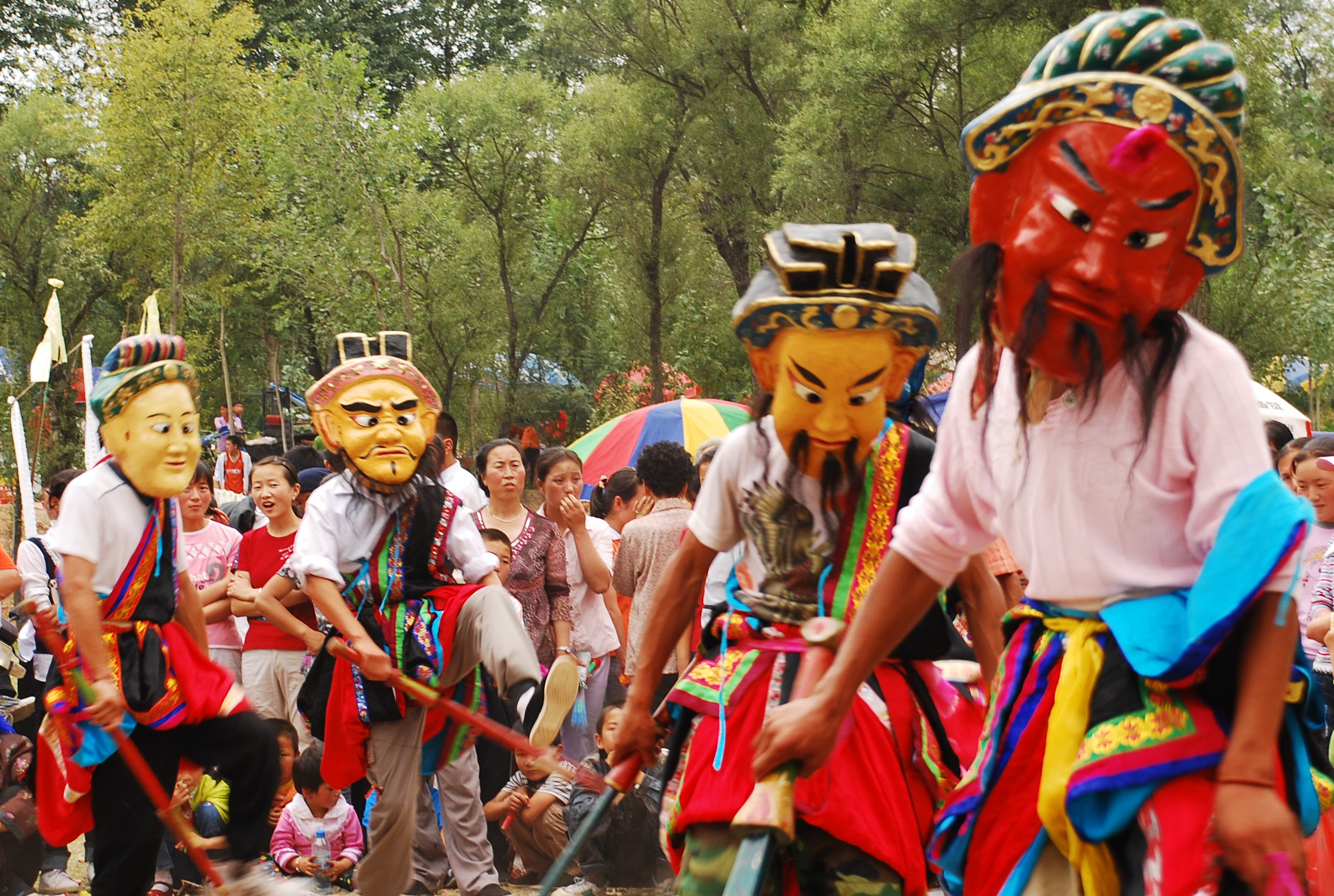
A Monguor masked dance performance.

Most Monguor in rapidly changing rural settlements today practice sedentary agriculture, supplemented by minimum animal husbandry, and seasonal work in towns and cities. Those who have succeeded in the Chinese educational system take up government jobs in a wide range of academic, medical, and business fields.

Traditional Monguor culture and language have become endangered. Traditional events like weddings, Nadun, funerals, and New Year rituals are increasingly abbreviated and traditional songs, riddles, folktales, and proverbs are vanishing.

=== Religion ===
In most villages, a Buddhist temple and a Taoist shrine coexist. Almost all the temples and shrines seen today have been rebuilt in the last three decades, since they were invariably destroyed during the Cultural Revolution (1966–1976). While Buddhist monks are common in most villages, Taoist priests and shamans have become very few and serve the whole area. The Taoist priests take charge of diverse functions that include weddings, funerals, and looking after the shrines, whereas the shaman's primary function is to serve as a trance medium during the Nadun celebration and sometimes illness management. Local accounts indicated that there have been multiple Catholic churches constructed in the Monguor areas in the past. They were destroyed in the early 1950s after the Communists took control and have not been rebuilt.

=== Nadun and Anzhao ===
Distinctive cultural events take place throughout the year. Whereas the common festival held during the Spring Festival is "Yangguo," the most characteristic tradition is represented by Nadun that takes place in the end of the summer. Nadun resembles Nadam of the Mongols in name but are different in format and content. Both "Nadun" and "Nadam" are special nouns designated to an annual festival and reflect their shared origins from the Xianbei who were recorded to have "one major gathering every spring for leisure and fun by river". Whereas the Mongolian Nadam preserved the nomadic features of horse race, wrestling, and archery, the Monguor Nadun has encoded their history through masked dance performances and presents as an annual military drill combined with joyful celebrations of harvest. Held by villages in turn along the Yellow River and circles through the entire Sanchuan/Guanting region in Minhe, the Nadun festival is inherently tied to agricultural work. It functions as the Monguor form of "Thanksgiving" in the Western culture and expresses gratitude for an abundance of harvest blessed by Heaven referred to as "Tiangere." The event lasts over two months, starting from the twelfth of the seventh month to the fifteenth of the ninth month by the Chinese lunar calendar, and spans for a total of 63 days, giving rise to its eponym as "the world’s longest festival". Among the Huzhu Monguor, the characteristic traditional dance is "Anzhao." Its name and styles bear resemblance to the "Andai" dance of the Mongols who live in Ordos, an area that has historically served as the transitional point for the Xianbei to move about in China.

=== Wedding songs ===
The traditional weddings of the Monguor differ markedly. In Minhe County, elaborate rules of courtesy and appropriateness were at work. Many songs "daola" were sung for days and nights with great variations in melody and contents. Wherever the Monguor go, they take their songs with them, which can be heard in parties, banquets, and at gatherings in cities where they work.
