= Xandighati Mongol Ethnic Township =

- Ethnic township
- Location within Xinjiang
- Coordinates: 47°46′05″N 88°22′37″E
- Country: China
- Autonomous Region: Xinjiang
- Prefecture: Altay
- County-level City: Altay

Area
  - Total: 528 km^{2} (204 sq mi)

Population (2018)
  - Total: 3,390
  - Density: 6.42/km^{2} (16.6/sq mi)

Xandighati Mongol Ethnic Township

Chinese name
- Simplified Chinese: 汗德尕特蒙古族乡
- Traditional Chinese: 汗德尕特蒙古族鄉
Transcriptions
Standard Mandarin
- Hanyu Pinyin: Hàndégǎtè Ménggǔzú Xiāng

Mongolian name
- Mongolian Cyrillic: Хандгайт монгол үндэстэний шиян
- Mongolian script: ᠬᠠᠨᠳᠠᠭᠠᠢᠲᠤᠮᠣᠩᠭᠣᠯᠦᠨᠳᠦᠰᠦᠲᠡᠨ ᠦᠰᠢᠶᠠᠩ
Transcriptions
- SASM/GNC: ꭓandaɣaitu moŋɣol ündüsüten-ü siyaŋ

Uyghur name
- Uyghur: خاندىغاتى موڭغۇل يېزىسى
Transcriptions
- Latin Yëziqi: Xandighati Mongghul Yëzisi
- SASM/GNC: Handiĝati Mongĝul Yêzisi

Kazakh name
- Kazakh: حاندىعاتى موڭعۇل ۇلتتىق اۋىلى; Handyğaty Moñğūl Ūlttyq auyly Хандығаты Моңғұл Ұлттық ауылы

Xandighati Mongol Ethnic Township is an ethnic township in Altay City, Altay Prefecture, Xinjiang, China. The ethnic township spans an area of 528 square kilometres (204 mi^{2}). As of 2018, Xandighati Mongol Ethnic Township has a hukou population of 3,390.

== History ==
On June 10, 2004, a painted petroglyph was discovered in Xandighati Mongol Ethnic Township. The painting, discovered in a grotto, is 2.5 metres (8.2 ft) tall and 1.5 metres (4.9 ft) wide. It is composed of 15 people, 31 oxen and horses, and 4 graphic pattens.

Prior to June 12, 1954, the area was part of Lamazhao Township (Chinese: 拉玛召乡) in Hongdun District One (Chinese: 红墩一区; pinyin: Hóngdūn yī qū) of Altay City. On that date, the area became Kangbutiebao Mongol Autonomous Township (Chinese: 康布铁堡蒙古族自治乡; pinyin: Kāngbùtiěbǎo Měnggǔzú zìzhì xiāng). In 1958, Kangbutiebao was reclassified as a people's commune, and was renamed to Dongfanghong Commune (lit. 'The East Is Red Commune') in 1967. The name was reverted to Kangbutiebao in 1978. In 1984, people's communes were abolished, and Kangbutiebao became a Mongol Township. On January 1, 1986, the area was reorganized as the Xandighati Mongol Ethnic Township, which it remains to this date.

== Geography ==
Xandighati Mongol Ethnic Township is located within the northeast of Altay City. To its east lies the town of Jiete'arelei and Kuoke'agashen Township, both within Fuhai County; to its south is Qie'erkeqi Township; to its west is Qiemu'erqieke Township; to its north is Lasite Township.

The ethnic township's elevation is high in the north, which is mountainous and ranges from 1,000 metres (3,300 ft) to 2,500 metres (8,200 ft) above sea level in elevation. The highest point in Xandighati Mongol Ethnic Township is Mount Hu'ergeng (Chinese: 胡尔埂山; pinyin: Hú'ěrgěng Shān). The southern portion of the ethnic township ranges from 800 metres (2,600 ft) to 1,000 metres (3,300 ft) above sea level in elevation, with the lowest portions lying along the lower reaches of the Xandighati River (Chinese: 汗德尕特河; pinyin: Hàndégǎtè Hé).

Within Xandighati Mongol Ethnic Township, the Irtysh River flows through Dabulehate Village (Chinese: 达布勒哈特村) and Jiaoshate Village (Chinese: 角沙特村). The 15 kilometres (9.3 mi) Xandighati River flows through the territory of Huobulete Village (Chinese: 霍布勒特村), Xandighati Village (Chinese: 汗德尕特村), Qiao'erhai Village (Chinese: 乔尔海村), and A'erqiate Village (Chinese: 阿尔恰特村).

The ethnic township has a semi-arid climate with long, snowy winters and short, cool summers.

== Administrative divisions ==
As of 2022, Xandighati Mongol Ethnic Township administers the following six administrative villages:

- Xandighati Village (Chinese: 汗德尕特村; pinyin: Hàndégǎtè Cūn) (حاندىعاتى قىستاعى)
- Qobilti (Huobulete) Village (Chinese: 霍布勒特村; pinyin: Huòbùlètè Cūn) (قوبىلتى قىستاعى)
- Shorqay (Qiao'erhai) Village (Chinese: 乔尔海村; pinyin: Qiáo'ěrhǎi Cūn) (شورقاي قىستاعى)
- Arshati (A'erqiate) Village (Chinese: 阿尔恰特村; pinyin: Ā'ěrqiàtè Cūn) (ارشاتى قىستاعى)
- Josati (Jiaosate) Village (Chinese: 角萨特村; pinyin: Jiǎosàtè Cūn) (جوساتى قىستاعى)
- Dabirqaytu (Dabulehate) Village (Chinese: 达布勒哈特村; pinyin: Dábùlèhātè Cūn) (دابىرقايتۋ قىستاعى)

== Demographics ==
As of 2010, 19.79% of Xandighati Mongol Ethnic Township's population is 14 years old or under, 74.48% is between 15 and 64 years old, and 5.73% is 65 years or older.

Kazakhs make up 49.69% of the ethnic township's population, while Mongols make up 33.00%, and Han Chinese comprise 15.37%.

At the year end of 2011, the ethnic township had an urbanization rate of 22.2%.

50.06% of Xandighati Mongol Ethnic Township's population is male, while 49.94% is female. The crude birth rate is 13.6‰ (per mille), while the crude death rate is 4.13‰, resulting in a rate of natural increase of 9.47‰.

As of 2018, Xandighati Mongol Ethnic Township has a hukou population of 3,390.

== Economy ==
Xandighati Mongol Ethnic Township has 8,633.3 mu of arable land, and 9,000 mu of usable grassland. The ethnic township's main crops include wheat and maize, while major cash crops include kidney beans and sunflowers.

In 2011, the value of the ethnic township's agricultural value totaled 43.182 million renminbi (RMB). That year, the ethnic township produced 1,474 tonnes of grain. 1,844.4 mu of kidney beans were planted, yielding 221.6 tonnes; 1,332 mu of sunflowers were planted, yielding 240 tonnes.

As of 2011, there are 45 commercial outlets in Xandighati Mongol Ethnic Township, and consumer retail spending totaled 1.451 million RMB. The ethnic township has two general stores or supermarkets as of 2018.

Proven mineral reserves in Xandighati Mongol Ethnic Township include iron, lead, zinc, and mica.

== Education ==
The ethnic township has 7 libraries with a collection of 16,000 books.

Xandighati Mongol Ethnic Township has a kindergarten staffed by four full-time teachers, which serves 91 students. The ethnic township also has one primary school staffed by 64 full-time teachers, which serves 155 students.

== Culture and education ==
As of 2011, Xandighati Mongol Ethnic Township was home to one culture center, and seven village-level cultural centers.

== See also ==
- List of township-level divisions of Xinjiang
