= Minhe Hui and Tu Autonomous County =

Minhe County 民和县
- Autonomous county
- 民和回族土族自治县 • مٍهْ خُوِذُو تُوذُو ذِجِشِیًا • Miinhoo Hui szarbaten Mongghul szarbaten njeenaa daglagu xan • Kamalog; Minhe Hui and Tu Autonomous County
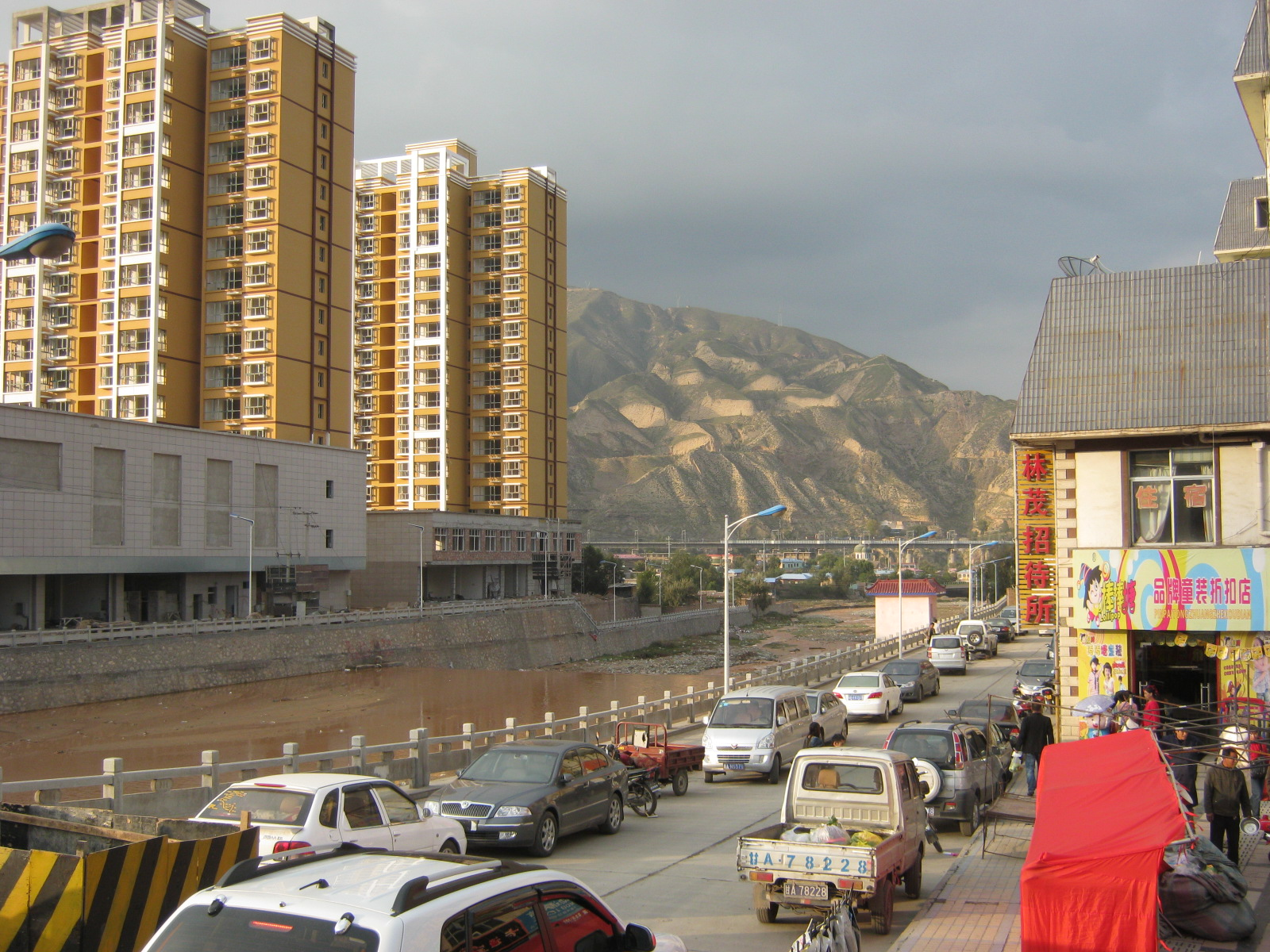

- Location of the seat in Qinghai
- Coordinates (Minhe County government): 36°19′12″N 102°49′51″E
- Country: China
- Province: Qinghai
- Prefecture-level city: Haidong
- County seat: Chuankou

Area
  - Autonomous county: 1,891 km^{2} (730 sq mi)

Population (2020)
  - Autonomous county: 326,964
  - Density: 172.9/km^{2} (447.8/sq mi)
  - Urban: 117,200
  - Rural: 320,900
- Time zone: UTC+8 (China Standard)
- Postal code: 810800
- Area code: 0972
- Website: http://www.minhe.gov.cn/

Chinese name
- Simplified Chinese: 民和回族土族自治县
- Traditional Chinese: 民和回族土族自治縣
Transcriptions
Standard Mandarin
- Hanyu Pinyin: Mínhé Huízú Tǔzú Zìzhìxiàn
other Mandarin
- Xiao'erjing: مٍهْ خُوِذُو تُوذُو ذِجِشِیًا

Tibetan name
- Tibetan: རྨིན་ཧོ་ཧུའེ་རིགས་ཧོར་རིགས་རང་སྐྱོང་རྫོང་། or དམར་གཙང་རྫོང་།
Transcriptions
- Wylie: rmin ho huʼe rigs hor rigs rang skyong rdzong or dmar gtsang rdzong

Minhe Hui and Tu Autonomous County (Chinese: 民和回族土族自治县; Xiao'erjing: مٍهْ خُوِذُو تُوذُو ذِجِشِیًا; Monguor: Miinhoo Hui szarbaten Mongghul szarbaten njeenaa daglagu xan), known in Tibetan as Kamalog, is the easternmost county in Qinghai Province, China. It is under the administration of Haidong (lit. Eastern Qinghai) city. "Hui" refers to the Chinese Muslims, whereas "Tu" refers to the ethnic group known as "Monguor" in the West and as "Tu Zu" in China. It borders the Honggu District of Gansu on the east, demarcated by the Datong River, a tributary to the Huangshui River, which eventually flows into the Yellow River.

The county is multi-ethnic and significant to not only holding the most densely populated Tu Zu settlement in Sanchuan/Guanting in its southeastern portion, but also as the homeland of the legendary Emperor Yü the Great, who established the Xia dynasty (2070–1600 BC), the first ever recorded dynasty in ancient Chinese history based on recent archaeological discoveries.

== Administrative divisions ==
Minhe is divided into 8 towns and 13 townships, and 1 ethnic township. The county government is seated in Chuankou.

- Chuankou Town (川口镇)
- Gushan Town (古鄯镇)
- Maying Town (马营镇)
- Guanting Town (官亭镇)
- Bazhou Town (巴州镇)
- Manping Town (满坪镇)
- Li'erbao Town (李二堡镇)
- Xiamen Town (峡门镇)
- Machangyuan Township (马场垣乡)
- Beishan Township (北山乡)
- Songshu Township (松树乡)
- Xigou Township (西沟乡)
- Zongbao Township (总堡乡)
- Longzhi Township (隆治乡)
- Dazhuang Township (大庄乡)
- Zhuandao Township (转导乡)
- Qianhe Township (前河乡)
- Gangou Township (甘沟乡)
- Zhongchuan Township (中川乡)
- Hetaozhuang Township (核桃庄乡)
- Xinmin Township (新民乡)
- Xin'ar Tibetan Ethnic Township (杏儿藏族乡, ཞིན་ཨར་བོད་རིགས་ཞང་།)

== Demographics ==
In 2019 the county had a registered population of 438,100 people. The county's urban population was 117,200 people, whereas the remaining 320,900 people lived in rural areas. The county recorded a birth rate of 10.90 per thousand, and a death rate of 4.44 per thousand, giving the county a rate of natural increase of 6.46 per thousand.

=== Ethnic groups ===
As of 2019, 38.28% of the county's population was ethnically Han Chinese. A 2004 report by the National Ethnic Affairs Commission reported that 44.51% of the county's population was ethnically Han Chinese, 40.45% was ethnically Hui, 11.26% was ethnically Monguor, and 3.55% was ethnically Tibetan.

=== Languages ===
The county has large populations of Hui, Tibetan, and Tu people, whose languages are commonly spoken in varying parts of the county. In addition to Standard Mandarin, there is also a unique Gangou dialect, a unique Guanting dialect, and a unique dialect in the Jingning Village of Gangou Township, Qinghai.

== Climate ==
Climate data for Minhe, elevation 1,814 m (5,951 ft), (1991–2020 normals, extremes 1981–2010)
Month	Jan	Feb	Mar	Apr	May	Jun	Jul	Aug	Sep	Oct	Nov	Dec	Year
Record high °C (°F)	14.2 (57.6)	19.6 (67.3)	27.4 (81.3)	32.2 (90.0)	31.8 (89.2)	33.2 (91.8)	37.8 (100.0)	35.4 (95.7)	30.4 (86.7)	26.4 (79.5)	21.9 (71.4)	17.0 (62.6)	37.8 (100.0)
Mean daily maximum °C (°F)	1.5 (34.7)	5.9 (42.6)	12.1 (53.8)	18.6 (65.5)	22.4 (72.3)	25.9 (78.6)	27.7 (81.9)	26.1 (79.0)	21.1 (70.0)	15.6 (60.1)	9.2 (48.6)	2.8 (37.0)	15.7 (60.3)
Daily mean °C (°F)	−5.6 (21.9)	−1.1 (30.0)	4.9 (40.8)	11.1 (52.0)	15.2 (59.4)	18.9 (66.0)	20.8 (69.4)	19.5 (67.1)	14.9 (58.8)	8.8 (47.8)	2.0 (35.6)	−4.1 (24.6)	8.8 (47.8)
Mean daily minimum °C (°F)	−10.6 (12.9)	−6.4 (20.5)	−0.5 (31.1)	5.1 (41.2)	9.3 (48.7)	13.3 (55.9)	15.5 (59.9)	14.7 (58.5)	10.6 (51.1)	4.2 (39.6)	−2.6 (27.3)	−8.7 (16.3)	3.7 (38.6)
Record low °C (°F)	−21.0 (−5.8)	−20.8 (−5.4)	−14.7 (5.5)	−6.0 (21.2)	−2.0 (28.4)	4.8 (40.6)	7.4 (45.3)	5.2 (41.4)	−0.4 (31.3)	−10.9 (12.4)	−14.9 (5.2)	−21.0 (−5.8)	−21.0 (−5.8)
Average precipitation mm (inches)	1.5 (0.06)	3.3 (0.13)	9.0 (0.35)	18.3 (0.72)	45.2 (1.78)	45.9 (1.81)	68.2 (2.69)	76.9 (3.03)	56.2 (2.21)	22.4 (0.88)	3.7 (0.15)	1.0 (0.04)	351.6 (13.85)
Average precipitation days (≥ 0.1 mm)	2.4	2.7	4.6	5.7	9.2	12.1	13.3	13.1	12.4	7.3	2.3	1.7	86.8
Average snowy days	3.8	4.6	5.2	1.5	0.2	0	0	0	0	1.1	3.2	2.8	22.4
Average relative humidity (%)	51	47	45	44	51	56	62	66	71	67	59	55	56
Mean monthly sunshine hours	171.3	180.1	201.3	215.5	224.9	215.5	220.7	208.5	170.3	184.4	183.6	176.8	2,352.9
Percentage possible sunshine	55	58	54	54	51	49	50	50	46	54	61	59	53
Source: China Meteorological Administration

== Economy ==
Minhe's GDP stood at 10.349 billion Yuan in 2019, of which, 1.329 billion Yuan came from the county's primary sector, 4.249 billion Yuan came from the county's secondary sector, and 4.771 billion Yuan came from the county's tertiary sector. The county's GDP per capita stood at 27,745 Yuan as of 2019.

The county's per capita disposable income was 18,487 Yuan in 2019, which stood at 31,432 Yuan for urban residents, and 11,706 Yuan for rural residents. Minhe's unemployment rate stood at 3.22% at the end of 2019. Retail sales in the county totaled 2.820 billion Yuan in 2019, of which, urban sales accounted for 1.448 billion, and rural sales accounted for 1.372 billion.

=== Agriculture ===
In 2019, 623,600 mu (41,570 hectares or 102,700 acres) of land was sown, of which, 235,500 mu (15,700 ha or 39,000 acres) was sown for corn, 119,600 mu (7,973 ha or 19,700 acres) was sown for potatoes, 103,700 mu (6,913 ha or 17,080 acres) was sown for wheat, 69,100 mu (4,610 ha or 11,400 acres) was sown for seed oils, and 46,000 mu (3,100 ha or 7,700 acres) was sown for vegetables and mushrooms. Animal husbandry is also common in Minhe, and the county's farmers have sizable populations of cattle, sheep, pigs, and poultry.

=== Industry ===
The county's largest industries are the production of cement, ferroalloys, aluminium, and graphite.

== Education ==
As of 2019, the county had 10,962 kindergarten students, 33,609 primary school students, 15,539 junior high students, 9,953 standard secondary school students, and 5,446 vocational secondary school students.

== Culture ==
A number of cultural traditions unique to particular regions in Minhe County have been recorded, and are generally attributed to the large amount of inter-ethnic contact in the region.

The region has a number of traditions unique to giving birth to a child, including unique midwifing practices, a "step on birth" (踏生; tà shēng) tradition where families invite a guest to visit their newborn in the hopes of the baby inheriting the guest's positive personality traits, a celebration for a newborn's 30th day known as a "baimanyue" (摆满月; bǎi mǎnyuè), and consulting books which host clan-specific baby names in order to name newborns.

Ethnic Monguor and Tibetan weddings in the area are remarkable in that they involve more singing than their Han Chinese counterparts.

== See also ==
- List of administrative divisions of Qinghai
