= Jalsan =

Buddhist leader and scholar (1947–2013)

Chinese name
- Simplified Chinese: 贾拉森
- Traditional Chinese: 賈拉森
Transcriptions
Standard Mandarin
- Hanyu Pinyin: Jiǎlāsēn

Mongolian name
- Mongolian Cyrillic: ᠵᠠᠯᠰᠠᠨ

Jalsan (Mongolian pronunciation: [t͡ɕáɬsəɴ]; 16 November 1947 – 28 April 28) was a Chinese Mongol politician, scholar, and Buddhist leader (tulku) in the People's Republic of China.

== Early life and education ==
Jalsan was born in Tianzhu Tibetan Autonomous County, Gansu, on the 13th day of the 12th month in the lunar calendar. He went to Alxa League, Inner Mongolia in 1958 to attend primary school. After his middle school graduation, he participated in the Down to the Countryside Movement. In 1978, he entered the M.A. programme in Mongolian language at the Inner Mongolia University. After his graduation, he went to Japan in 1985 to study for a further two years as an international student at the Tokyo University of Foreign Studies before returning to Gansu to study Tibetan at the Northwest University for Nationalities in 1988.

== Politics ==
Jalsan served as a member of the Chinese People's Political Consultative Conference and the Standing Committee of the National People's Congress of the People's Republic of China.

== Religious positions ==
Jalsan was a tulku of the Southern Temple of the Helan Mountains, the largest Buddhist temple in Inner Mongolia. He was also involved with a number of organisations relating to Buddhism in China: he is a board member of the Buddhist Association of China, president of the Buddhist Association of Inner Mongolia, and principal of the Buddhist School of Inner Mongolia.

== Academic work ==
In the academic world, Jalsan was both a regular professor at the Inner Mongolia University and a visiting professor at the Northwest University for Nationalities.

== Selected publications ==
- 保朝鲁 [Bolquluu]; 贾拉森 [Jalsan] (1991), 东部裕固语和蒙古语 [Eastern Yugur and Mongolian] (in Chinese (China)), Inner Mongolia People's Publishing House, OCLC 299469024
- 贾拉森 [Jalsan]; 巴达玛敖德斯尔 [Badma-odsar], eds. (August 1997), 论文与纪念文集：清格尔泰教授执教50周年纪念文集 (in Chinese (China)), Inner Mongolia University Press, ISBN 7-81015-764-7; a Festschrift in honour of Professor Chinggeltei
