= Mongols in China =

Ethnic minority in China

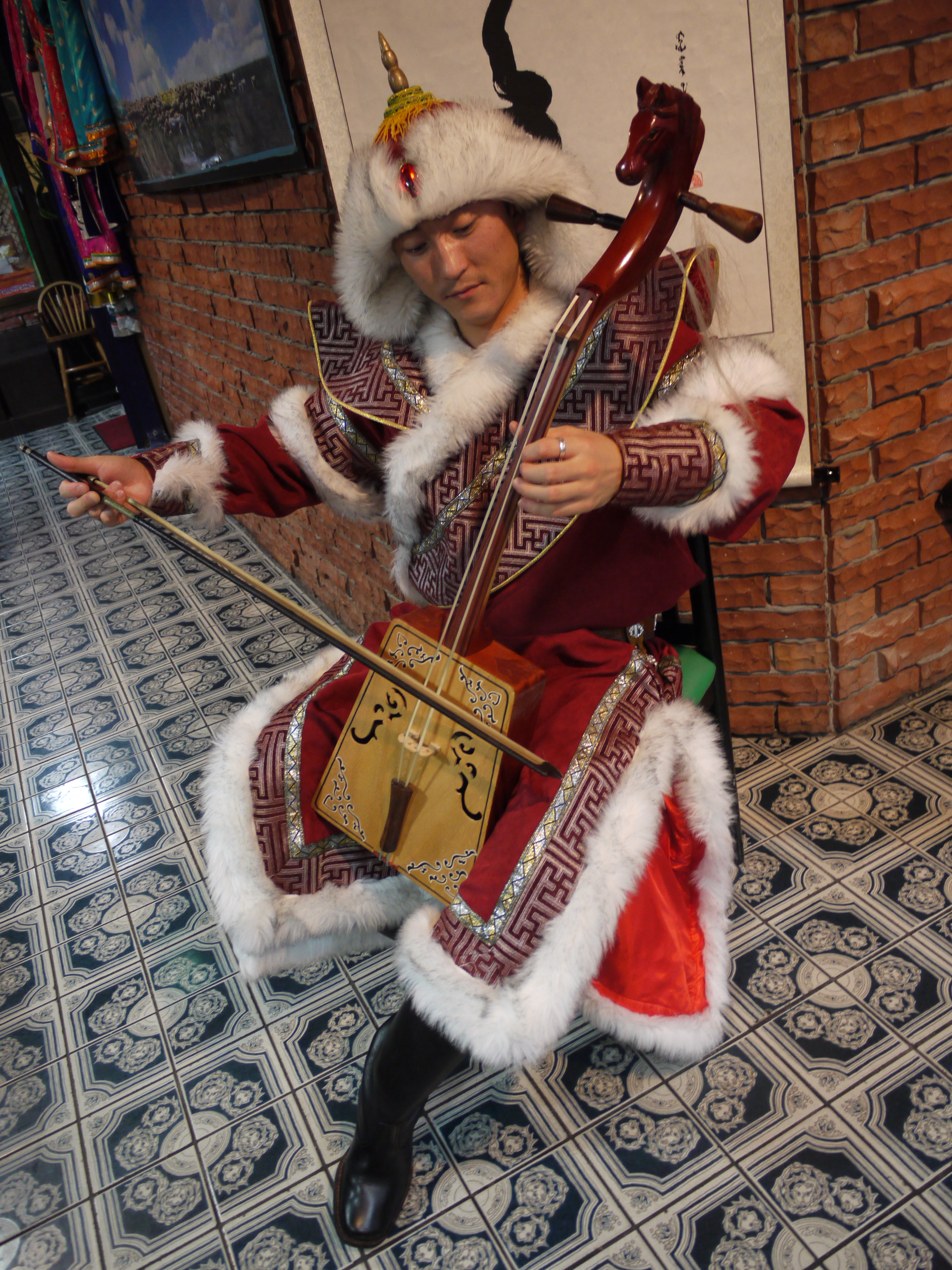
- A Mongol musician playing an Inner Mongolian–style morin khuur (horse fiddle)

Total population
- 6,290,204

Regions with significant populations
- Inner Mongolia (majority); Northeast China; Xinjiang; Qinghai

Languages
- Mongolian; Oirat; Buryat; Mandarin Chinese; Jin

Religion
- Tibetan Buddhism; Mongolian shamanism (Tengrism); Islam

Related ethnic groups
- Buryats; Oirats

Mongols in China
- Simplified Chinese: 中国蒙古族
- Traditional Chinese: 中國蒙古族
Transcriptions
Standard Mandarin
- Hanyu Pinyin: Zhōngguó Ménggǔzú

Mongols in China, also known as Mongolian Chinese or Chinese Mongols, are ethnic Mongols who live in China and hold Chinese citizenship. They are one of the 56 ethnic groups recognized by the Chinese government.

As of 2020, there are 6,290,204 Mongols in China, a 0.45% increase from the 2010 national census. Most of them live in Inner Mongolia, Northeast China, Xinjiang and Qinghai. The Mongol population in China is nearly twice as much as that of the sovereign state of Mongolia.

== Distribution ==
Mongol autonomous subdivisions of China

The Mongols in China are divided between autonomous regions and provinces as follows:

- 68.72%: Inner Mongolia Autonomous Region
- 11.52%: Liaoning Province
- 2.96%: Jilin Province
- 2.92%: Hebei Province
- 2.58%: Xinjiang Uyghur Autonomous Region
- 2.43%: Heilongjiang Province
- 1.48%: Qinghai Province
- 1.41%: Henan Province
- 5.98%: Rest of China

Besides the Inner Mongolia autonomous region, there are other Mongol autonomous administrative subdivisions in China.

Prefecture level:

- Haixi Mongol and Tibetan Autonomous Prefecture (in Qinghai)
- Bayingolin Mongol Autonomous Prefecture (in Xinjiang)
- Bortala Mongol Autonomous Prefecture (in Xinjiang)

County level:

- Weichang Manchu and Mongol Autonomous County (in Hebei)
- Harqin Left Mongol Autonomous County (in Liaoning)
- Fuxin Mongol Autonomous County (in Liaoning)
- Qian Gorlos Mongol Autonomous County (in Jilin)
- Dorbod Mongol Autonomous County (in Heilongjiang)
- Subei Mongol Autonomous County (in Gansu)
- Henan Mongol Autonomous County (in Qinghai)
- Hoboksar Mongol Autonomous County (in Xinjiang)

== Classification ==
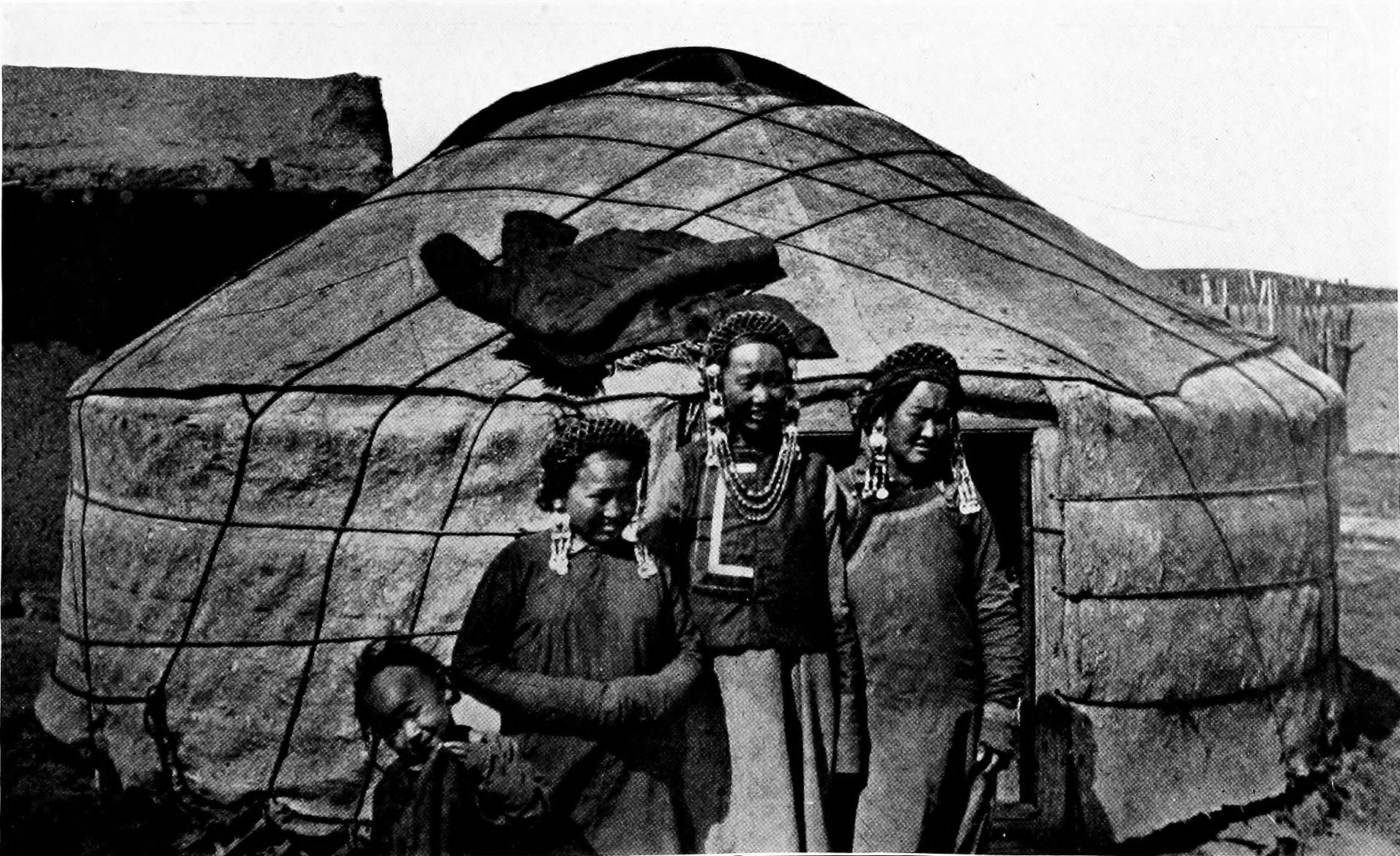
Photo by Yvette Borup Andrews in 1920

China classifies various Mongolic groups, such as the Buryats and Oirats, together with the Inner Mongols under a single category of "Mongol." The Chinese government also classifies the Tuvans as Mongols, despite Tuvans being a Turkic, non-Mongolic ethnic group. The official language used for all of these Mongols in China is a literary standard based on the Chahar dialect of Mongol.

The ethnic classification might be inaccurate due to lack of information regarding the registering policy.

Some populations officially classified as Mongols by the government of the People's Republic of China do not currently speak any form of Mongolic language. Such populations include the Sichuan Mongols (most of whom speak a form of Naic language), the Yunnan Mongols (most of whom speak a form of Loloish language), and the Mongols of Henan Mongol Autonomous County in Qinghai (most of whom speak Amdo Tibetan and/or Chinese).

As of July 2023, official publications have avoided references to Mongolians in China and instead used the term "northern frontier culture" (bei jiang wenhua).

== Genetics ==
Among the Mongols of China, mitochondrial haplogroup D was in first place (27.07%), followed by mitochondrial haplogroups B (11.60%), F (10.77%), Z (8.01%), G (7, 73%), C (6.91%), A (6.08%), N (5.25%) and M7 (5.25%). Other mitochondrial haplogroups (HV, H, I, M8, M9, M10, M11, R, T, U, W and Y) were sporadically distributed among the studied Mongols of China with frequencies of no more than 1.66%.

Guang-Lin He et al. (2022) examined a sample of current Mongols of China (n=175, including n=97 from Inner Mongolia, n=27 from Liaoning, n=10 from Heilongjiang, n=10 from Jilin, n=3 from Qinghai, n=3 from Xinjiang, and n=25 from elsewhere in China) and found different haplogroup O subclades (107/175 = 61.1% in total) to be the most frequently observed Y-DNA haplogroup:

- O1-F265/M1354 12.0% (21/175)
  - O1a1a-M307.1/P203.1 3.4% (6/175)
  - O1b-M268 8.6% (15/175)
    - O1b1a-M1470 5.7% (10/175)
      - O1b1a1-PK4 2.3% (4/175)
      - O1b1a2-Page59 3.4% (6/175)
    - O1b2a1a-F1204 2.9% (5/175)
      - O1b2a1a1-CTS713 2.3% (4/175)
      - O1b2a1a3a-CTS1215 0.6% (1/175)
- O2a-M324 49.1% (86/175)
  - O2a1-L127.1 21.7% (38/175)
    - O2a1a1a1b-F854 0.6% (1/175)
    - O2a1c-IMS-JST002611 21.1% (37/175)
      - O2a1c1a1a1a1-F325 16.6% (29/175)
      - O2a1c1a2-F449 4.6% (8/175)
  - O2a2-P201 27.4% (48/175)
    - O2a2a1a-CTS445 4.6% (8/175)
      - O2a2a1a1a-M159 0.6% (1/175)
      - O2a2a1a2a-F1276 2.9% (5/175)
        - O2a2a1a2a1a2-N5 1.7% (3/175)
    - O2a2b-P164 22.9% (40/175)
      - O2a2b1-M134 21.1% (37/175)
        - O2a2b1a1-M117 12.0% (21/175)
        - O2a2b1a2-F114 9.1% (16/175)
      - O2a2b2a2-AM01845/F706 1.7% (3/175)

The second most frequently observed Y-DNA haplogroup among the sampled Mongols from China was C2 (22.9%, including 16.6% "Northern" i.e. Mongolian/Siberian C2b1a, 1.7% typically Mongolic C2c1a1a1-M407, and 4.6% "Southern" i.e. East Asian C2c1(xC2c1a1a1)), followed by N1-CTS3750 (6.3%, including 2.9% N1a2a1a~, 1.1% N1a2b2a1c~, 1.1% N1b2a2~, 0.6% N1a1a1a1a3a, and 0.6% N1b1), Q (4.6%, including 4.0% Q1a1a1 and 0.6% Q2a1a1), R1a1a1b2a-Z94 (2.3%), and D-M533 (1.1%). Y-chromosomal haplogroup E1b1b1a1b2 (V22) was observed in one Mongol individual from Hohhot, G2a2b2a1a1a2a1a (L654.2) was observed in one Mongol individual from Alxa League, and I2a1b2a1a1a1 (BY128/Y5596) was observed in one Mongol individual from Hinggan League.

== Subgroups ==
Distribution of Mongol subgroups in 1911

- Abaga
- Abaganar
- Aohans
- Baarins
- Buryats
- Chahars
- Gorlos
- Jalaids
- Jaruud
- Khalkha
- Kharchin
- Khishigten
- Khorchin
- Khuuchid
- Muumyangan
- Naimans
- Oirats
  - Dzungar
  - Khoid
  - Khoshut
  - Olot
  - Torghut
  - Upper Mongols
- Onnigud
- Ordos
- Sichuan Mongols
- Sunud
- Urad

== Related groups ==
Not all groups of people related to the medieval Mongols are officially classified as Mongols under the current system. Other official ethnic groups in China which speak Mongolic languages include:

- the Dongxiang of Gansu Province
- the Monguor of Qinghai and Gansu Provinces
- the Daur of Inner Mongolia
- the Bonan of Gansu Province
- some of the Yugurs of Gansu Province (other Yugurs speak a Turkic language)
- the Kuangjia Hui of Qinghai Province

== Discrimination ==
Mongols in China face discrimination by the current Chinese government on the goal of assimilating the Mongolian population into the Han population.

Tsakhiagiin Elbegdorj, former president of Mongolia, once stated that "China is trying to get rid of the Mongolian minority within its borders." Once on good terms with Xi Jinping, he changed his stance and became a fierce critic of Xi Jinping due to China's policy decisions pertaining to the Mongolian demography. He said that he feared that Mongolians in China would become the next Uyghurs.

=== Schooling ===
The NPC declared "minority language-medium education is unconstitutional (People's Daily)," enforcing this within Inner Mongolian schools, banning the teaching of the Mongolian language, along with riding of different kinds of Mongolian material that are deemed to de-emphasize Chinese nationality and common identity. In September 2021, there was a rare protest against the enforcement of Mandarin language as primary instruction medium in schools by the Mongolian community, mostly parents. About 8,000-10,000 protestors were arrested. In 2023, a book on the history of the Mongols was banned for "historical nihilism."

=== Climate change and poverty relief ===
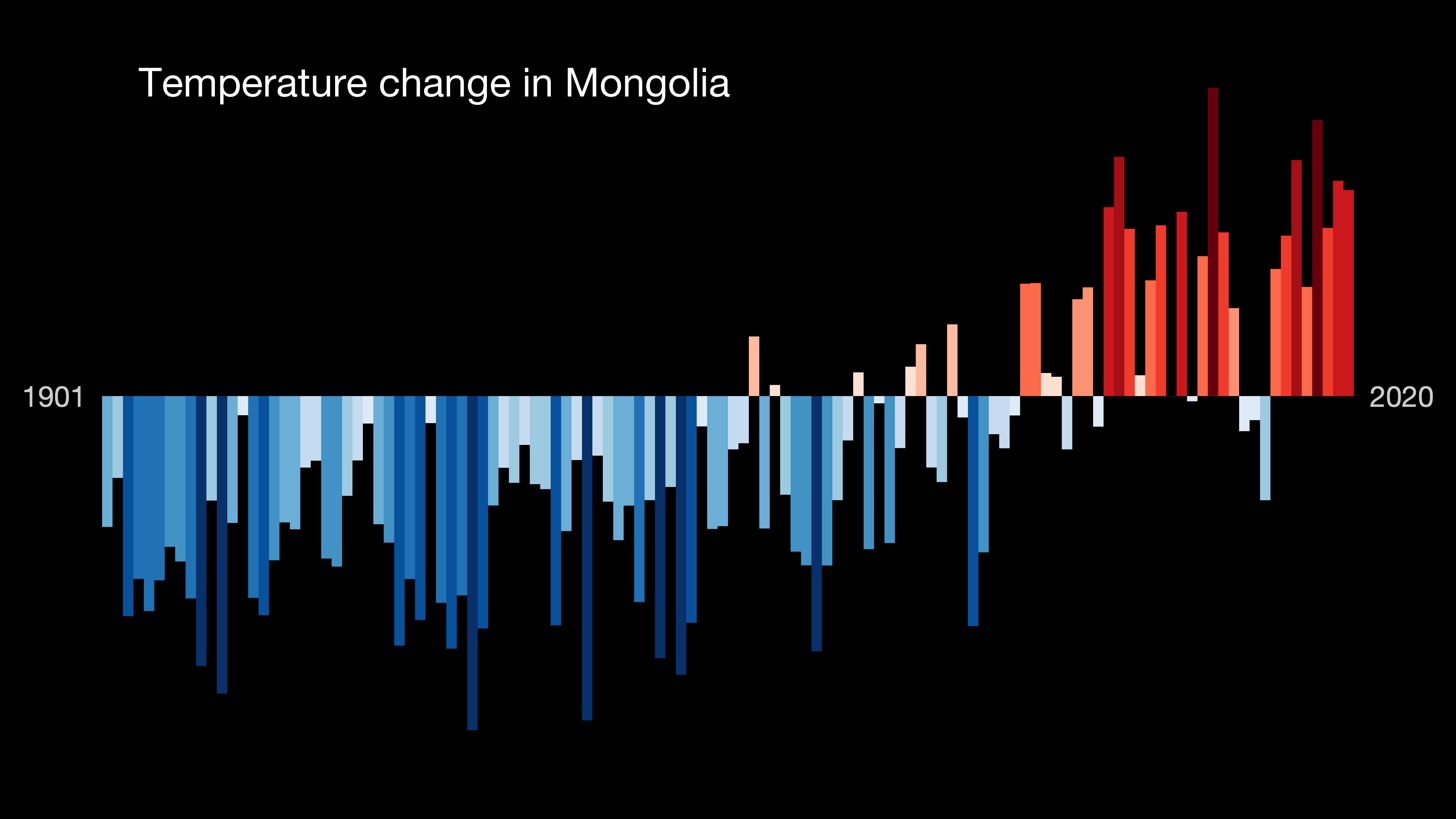
Temperature changes in Inner Mongolia, China.

The Chinese government alleges that Mongol herders/nomads are responsible for inciting climate change due to pastoralist practices. However, this was due to the Household Responsibility System that encouraged industrialized agriculture as opposed to shared grasslands. Under the ecological migration policy, the Chinese government has moved thousands of Mongols into urban areas on the basis that the Mongolian nomadic lifestyle has resulted in desertification and sandstorms. In support of the "Go West" campaign, the Chinese government relocated Mongolian people in masses in favor of ecosystem recovery. This movement has resulted in disparities in language, and thus income. Consequently, this process has resulted in Mongolian impoverishment. However, this gap has recently been closing as a result of Mongolian language assimilation.

== Notable people ==
- Buren Bayaer, singer, composer and a disc jockey
- Ulanhu, politician, former chairman of Inner Mongolia, former vice president of the People's Republic
- Bayanqolu, Communist Party secretary of Jilin, former party secretary of Ningbo city
- Demchugdongrub, Qing dynasty prince and puppet ruler of Mengjiang.
- Uyunqimg, former vice-chair of the Standing Committee of the National People's Congress
- Fu Ying, deputy foreign minister, former ambassador to the United Kingdom, Australia and the Philippines
- Li Siguang, geologist, founder of China's geomechanics
- Yang Shixian, chemist, chancellor of Nankai University
- Mengke Bateer, CBA and NBA basketball player
- Buyunchaokete, tennis player
- Bao Xishun, one of the tallest people in the world
- Tengger, a pop/rock musician
- Uudam, child singer
- Huugjilt, man wrongfully executed in 1996
- Zhang Xiaoping
- Chinggeltei (1924–2013), linguist, one of the world's few experts on the Khitan language
- Jalsan, linguist and Buddhist leader
- Batdorj-in Baasanjab, actor
- Xiao Qian, academic
- Bai Xue, lawyer and legal academic
- Bai Yansong, TV anchor
- Yangwei Linghua, singer and female vocal of Phoenix Legend
- Han Lei, pop singer
- Wang Lijun, disgraced police chief and political figure
- Bai Wenqi, lieutenant general of the PLA Air Force
- Ulan, deputy party chief of Hunan Province
- Yu Shi, actor

== See also ==
- Demographics of China
- Khatso (Yunnan Mongols)
- Mongols
- Mongols in Taiwan
- Oirats (Western Mongols)
- Sichuan Mongols
- Upper Mongols
