= Songyuan Chaganhu Airport =

Airport in Jilin, China

Songyuan Chaganhu Airport 松原查干湖机场
- IATA: YSQ; ICAO: ZYSQ

Summary
- Airport type: Public
- Serves: Songyuan, Jilin
- Location: Chaganhu, Qian Gorlos County
- Opened: 29 October 2017; 8 years ago
- Elevation AMSL: 140 m / 459 ft
- Coordinates: 44.938114°N 124.550178°E

Map
- Location of airport in Jilin

Runways
Direction	Length		Surface
Direction	m	ft	Surface
04/22	2,500	8,202

Statistics (2021)
- Passengers: 52,829
- Aircraft movements: 81,189
- Cargo (metric tons): 1.7

Songyuan Chaganhu Airport
- Simplified Chinese: 松原查干湖机场
- Traditional Chinese: 松原查干湖機場
Transcriptions
Standard Mandarin
- Hanyu Pinyin: Sōngyuán Chágānhú Jīchǎng

Songyuan Chaganhu Airport (IATA: YSQ, ICAO: ZYSQ) is an airport serving the city of Songyuan in Northeast China's Jilin Province. It is located in Chaganhu Village in Qian Gorlos Mongol Autonomous County, 30 kilometres (19 mi) from the city center, and 27 kilometres (17 mi) from Chagan Lake (Chaganhu) nature reserve. The airport received approval from the central government in September 2014. The total investment is 1.15 billion yuan. It was opened on 29 October 2017 with an inaugural Air China flight to Beijing.

== Facilities ==
The airport has a runway that is 2,500 meters long and 45 meters wide (class 4C), a 4,600-square-meter terminal building, and five aircraft parking aprons. It is designed to handle 400,000 passengers and 2,000 tons of cargo annually by 2020.

== Airlines and destinations ==
Airlines	Destinations
9 Air	Guangzhou
China United Airlines	Beijing–Daxing
Sichuan Airlines	Chengdu–Tianfu, Shijiazhuang
Spring Airlines	Shanghai–Pudong

== See also ==
- List of airports in China
- List of the busiest airports in China
