= Choijinzhab =

Chinese Mongol linguist (1931–2022)

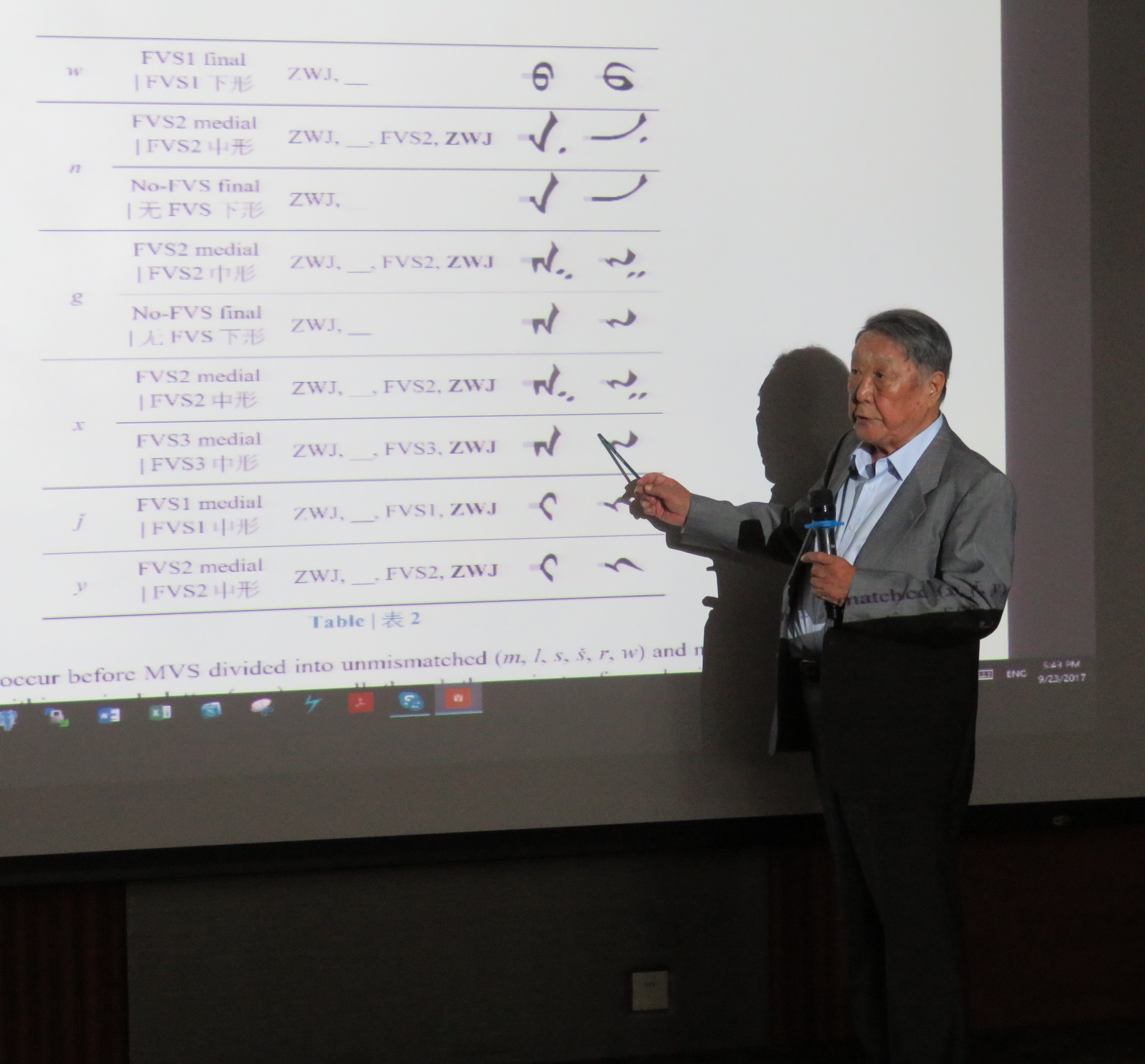
- Choijinzhab in 2017
- Born: 16 January 1931; Jirim League, Inner Mongolia, China
- Died: 29 April 2022 (aged 91)
- Citizenship: China
- Known for: Study of Mongolian language
- Scientific career
- Fields: Linguistics
- Institutions: Inner Mongolia University

Signature
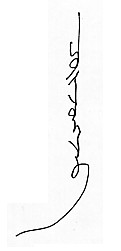

Choijinzhab

Chinese name
- Traditional Chinese: 確精扎布
- Simplified Chinese: 确精扎布
Transcriptions
Standard Mandarin
- Hanyu Pinyin: Quèjīngzhābù

Mongolian script name
- Mongolian script: ᠴᠣᠶᠢᠵᠣᠩᠵᠠᠪ

Choijinzhab (Mongolian pronunciation: [tɕʰɞ́ɪtɕɪ̆ɲtɕəw̜]; 16 January 1931 – 29 April 2022) was a Chinese Mongol linguist.

== Biography ==
Choijinzhab was born in Jirem League, Inner Mongolia, in 1931. After graduating from Ulaanbaatar Normal College in Mongolia in 1949, he taught at a primary school in Ulaanbaatar before returning to Inner Mongolia in 1950. He initially worked as an editor at the Inner Mongolia People's Publishing House, and then studied as a research student at the Central College for Nationalities from 1954 to 1957. After graduating, he took up a post at Inner Mongolia University, where he remained through his career. He was a professor at the university's Institute of Mongolian Studies. He was also the honorary director of the Chinese Academy of Mongolian Language and the director of the Chinese Academy of Ethnic Languages.

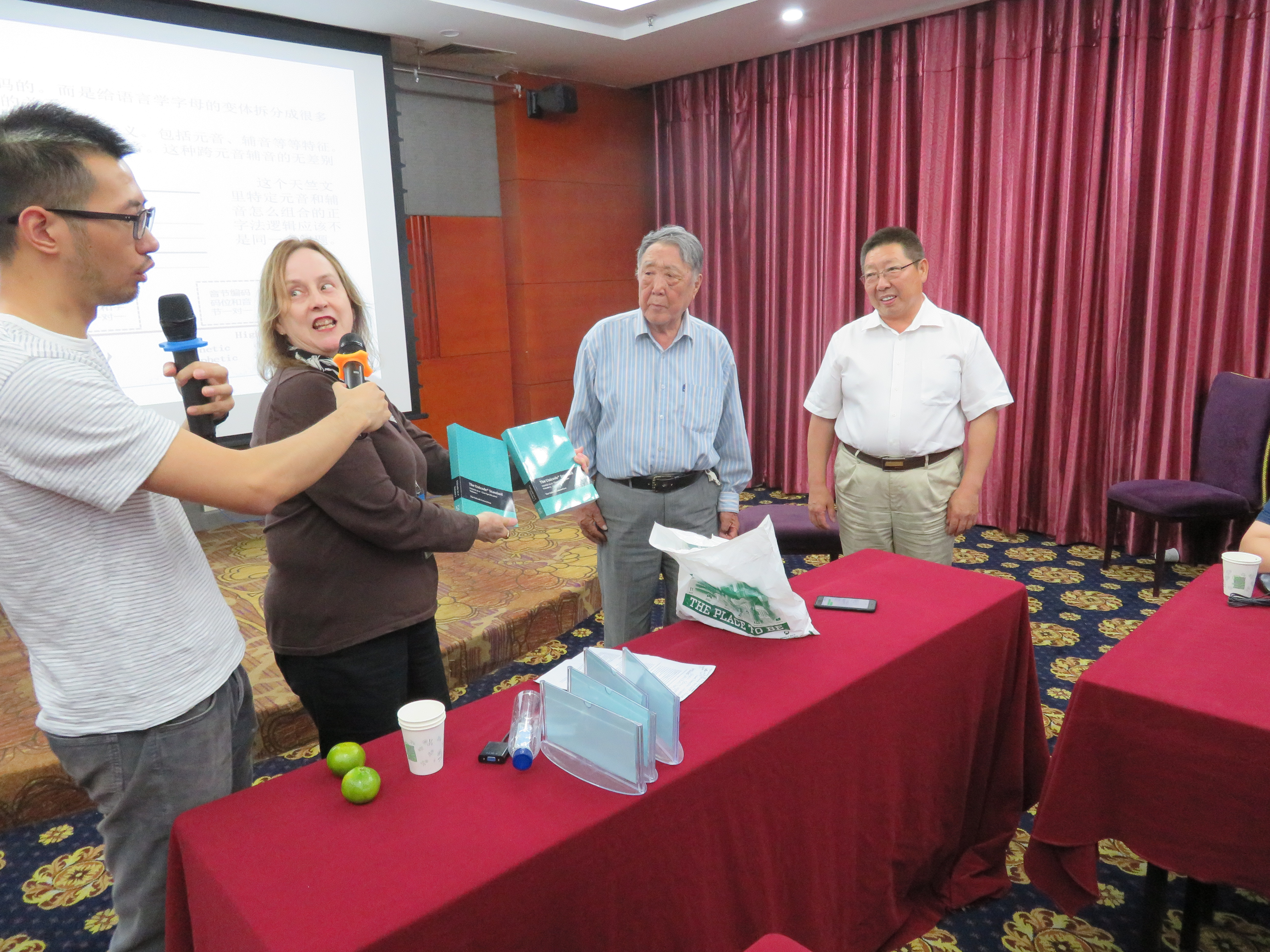
Choijinzhab being presented with a copy of the Unicode Standard at an international meeting in Hohhot in 2017

Between 1983 and 2022, Choijinzhab was involved with the computerization of Mongolian and the creation of software for writing and editing the language. He also worked on the standardization of the Mongolian script, both within China and internationally, and in 1998-1999 was intimately involved in the encoding of Mongolian in the Universal Character Set and Unicode. He was also involved in the encoding of the Phags-pa script in 2003–2004.

== Works ==
- 1985. Lao Mengwen Tuo Mengwen Duizhao Mengyu Cidian 老蒙文托蒙文对照蒙语词典 (Dictionary of Mongolian with Old Mongolian and Todo Mongolian). Hohhot.
- 1987. Weilate Fangyan Huayu Cailiao 卫拉特方言话语材料 (Materials on the Oirat Dialect). Hohhot.
- 1989. Mengguyu Yufa Yanjiu 蒙古语语法研究 (Study of Mongolian Grammar). Hohhot.
- 1991. Hanyi Meng Jichu Zhishi 汉译蒙基础知识 (Chinese Translation of Mongolian Basic Knowledge). Hohhot.
- 1998. Weilate Fangyan Cihui 卫拉特方言词汇 (Vocabulary of the Oirat Dialect). Hohhot.
- 1999. Mengguyu Yuyin Shengxue Fenxi 蒙古语语音声学分析 (Analysis of the Mongolian Phonetics). Hohhot.
- 2000. Mengguwen Bianma 蒙古文编码 (Mongolian Encoding). Hohhot. ISBN 7-81074-096-2
- Hitoshi Kuribayashi and Choijinzhab, 2001. Gencho hishi Mongorugo zentango gobi sakuin (Word- and suffix-index to The Secret history of the Mongols). Sendai.
