= Anti-Mongolian sentiment =

Dislike, otherwise opposition to the Mongols and the Mongol regime

Anti-Mongolian sentiment, anti-Mongol sentiment, Mongolophobia or anti-Mongolianism is the term used to describe, in general, the prejudice against or hatred toward Mongolia or Mongols. It has been built throughout history by the expansions of the Mongol Empire and its divisions such as the Golden Horde, being prevalently made by grievancies with countries that were attacked or conquered in said times, which by extent lists most of Europe.

== Russia ==
=== Russian Empire ===
The Tsardom of Russia, the Russian Empire, and the Soviet Union performed many atrocities against the Mongols (assimilate, reduce the population, extinguish the language, culture, tradition, history, religion and ethnic identity). During the existence of the Russian Empire, Tsar Peter the Great said: "The headwaters of the Yenisei River must be Russian land". The Russian Empire sent the Kalmyks and Buryats to war to reduce the populations (World War I and other wars).

=== Soviet Union ===
Soviet Russian scientists attempted to convince the Kalmyks and Buryats that they were not Mongols during the 20th century (demongolization policy). 35,000 Buryats were killed during the rebellion of 1927 and around one-third of Buryat population in Russia died in the 1900s–1950s. In 1919 the Buryats established a small theocratic Balagad state in Kizhinginsky District of Russia and the Buryat's state fell in 1926. In 1958, the name "Mongol" was removed from the name of the Buryat-Mongol Autonomous Soviet Socialist Republic.

On 22 January 1922 Mongolia proposed to migrate the Kalmyks during the Kalmykian Famine but Russia refused. 71–93,000 (around half of the population) Kalmyks died during the famine. The Kalmyks revolted against Russia in 1926, 1930 and 1942–1943. On 23 April 1923 Joseph Stalin, the General Secretary of the Soviet Union at the time, said "We are carrying out a wrong policy on the Kalmyks who related to the Mongols. Our policy is too peaceful". In March 1927, the Soviet government deported 20,000 Kalmyks to Siberia and Karelia. The Kalmyks founded sovereign Republic of Oirat-Kalmyk on 22 March 1930. The Oirat State created a military and clashed with the Soviet Red Army. 200 Kalmyk soldiers defeated 1,700 Soviet soldiers in the Durvud province of Kalmykia but the Oirat State was destroyed by the Red Army in 1930.

The Soviet Union deported all Kalmyks to Siberia in 1943 and around half of (97–98,000) Kalmyk people deported to Siberia died before being allowed to return home in 1957. The government of the Soviet Union forbade teaching Kalmyk language during their time in Siberia. The Kalmyks' main purpose was to migrate to Mongolia and many Kalmyks joined the German Army. Marshal Khorloogiin Choibalsan attempted to migrate the deportees to Mongolia and he met with them in Siberia during his visit to Russia. Under the Law of the Russian Federation of April 26, 1991 "On Rehabilitation of Exiled Peoples," repressions against Kalmyks and other peoples were qualified as an act of genocide.

== China ==
=== Imperial China ===
==== Qing genocide of Dzungars ====
The Dzungar Mongols lived in an area that stretched from the west end of the Great Wall of China to present-day eastern Kazakhstan and from present-day northern Kyrgyzstan to southern Siberia (most of which is located in present-day Xinjiang), and were the last nomadic empire to threaten China, which they did from the early 17th century through the middle of the 18th century. After a series of inconclusive military conflicts that started in the 1680s, the Dzungars were subjugated by the Manchu-led Qing dynasty (1644–1912) in the late 1750s.

Clarke argued that the Qing campaign in 1757–58 "amounted to the complete destruction of not only the Dzungar state but of the Dzungars as a people." After the Qianlong Emperor led Qing forces to victory over the Dzungar Oirat (Western) Mongols in 1755, he originally was going to split the Dzungar Khanates into four tribes headed by four Khans. The Khoit tribe was to have the Dzungar leader Amursana as its Khan. Amursana rejected the Qing arrangement and rebelled since he wanted to be leader of a united Dzungar nation. The Qianlong Emperor then issued his orders for the genocide and eradication of the entire Dzungar nation and name, Qing Manchu Bannermen and Khalkha (Eastern) Mongols enslaved Dzungar women and children while slaying the other Dzungars.

The Qianlong Emperor then ordered the genocide of the Dzungars, moving the remaining Dzungar people to the mainland and ordering the generals to kill all the men in Barkol or Suzhou, and divided their wives and children to Qing forces, which were made out of Manchu Bannermen and Khalkha Mongols. Qing scholar Wei Yuan estimated the total population of Dzungars before the fall at 600,000 people or 200,000 households. Oirat officer Saaral betrayed and battled against the Oirats. In a widely cited account of the war, Wei Yuan wrote that about 40% of the Dzungar households were killed by smallpox, 20% fled to Russia or Kazakh tribes, and 30% were killed by the Qing army of Manchu Bannermen and Khalkha Mongols, leaving no yurts in an area of several thousand li except those of the surrendered. During this war Kazakhs attacked dispersed Oirats and Altays. Based on this account, Wen-Djang Chu wrote that 80% of the 600,000 or more Dzungars (especially Choros, Olot, Khoid, Baatud and Zakhchin) were destroyed by disease and attack which Michael Clarke described as "the complete destruction of not only the Dzungar state but of the Dzungars as a people." Historian Peter Perdue attributed the decimation of the Dzungars to an explicit policy of extermination launched by the Qianlong Emperor, but he also observed signs of a more lenient policy after mid-1757. Mark Levene, a historian whose recent research interests focus on genocide, has stated that the extermination of the Dzungars was "arguably the eighteenth century genocide par excellence". The Dzungar genocide was completed by a combination of a smallpox epidemic and the direct slaughter of Dzungars by Qing forces made out of Manchu Bannermen and (Khalkha) Mongols.

Anti-Dzungar Uyghur rebels from the Turfan and Hami oases had submitted to Qing rule as vassals and requested Qing help for overthrowing Dzungar rule. Uyghur leaders like Emin Khoja were granted titles within the Qing nobility, and these Uyghurs helped supply the Qing military forces during the anti-Dzungar campaign. The Qing employed Khoja Emin in its campaign against the Dzungars and used him as an intermediary with Muslims from the Tarim Basin to inform them that the Qing were only aiming to kill Dzungars and that they would leave the Muslims alone, and also to convince them to kill the Dzungars themselves and side with the Qing since the Qing noted the Muslims' resentment of their former experience under Dzungar rule at the hands of Tsewang Araptan.

It was not until generations later that Dzungaria rebounded from the destruction and near liquidation of the Dzungars after the mass slayings of nearly a million Dzungars. Historian Peter Perdue has shown that the decimation of the Dzungars was the result of an explicit policy of extermination launched by the Qianlong Emperor, Perdue attributed the decimation of the Dzungars to a "deliberate use of massacre" and has described it as an "ethnic genocide". Although this "deliberate use of massacre" has been largely ignored by modern scholars, Dr. Mark Levene, a historian whose recent research interests focus on genocide, has stated that the extermination of the Dzungars was "arguably the eighteenth century genocide par excellence".

The Qing "final solution" of genocide to solve the problem of the Dzungars made the Qing-sponsored settlement of millions of Han, Hui, Turkestani Oasis people (Uyghurs) and Manchu Bannermen in Dzungaria possible, since the land was now devoid of Dzungars. The Dzungarian basin, which used to be inhabited by Dzungars is currently inhabited by Kazakhs. In northern Xinjiang, the Qing brought in Han, Hui, Uyghur, Xibe, and Kazakh colonists after they exterminated the Dzungar Oirat Mongols in the region, with one-third of Xinjiang's total population consisting of Hui and Han in the northern are, while around two-thirds were Uyghurs in southern Xinjiang's Tarim Basin. In Dzungaria, the Qing established new cities like Ürümqi and Yining. The Qing were the ones who unified Xinjiang and changed its demographic situation.

The depopulation of northern Xinjiang after the Buddhist Oirats were slaughtered, led to the Qing settling Manchu, Sibo (Xibe), Daurs (a sub-Mongolic people), Solons, Han Chinese, Hui Muslims, and Turkic Muslim Taranchis in the north, with Han Chinese and Hui migrants making up the greatest number of settlers. Since it was the crushing of the Buddhist Öölöd (Dzungars) by the Qing which led to the promotion of Islam and the empowerment of the Muslim Begs in southern Xinjiang, and migration of Muslim Taranchis to northern Xinjiang, it was proposed by Henry Schwarz that "the Qing victory was, in a certain sense, a victory for Islam". Xinjiang was a unified defined geographic identity created and developed by the Qing. It was the Qing who led to Turkic Muslim power in the region increasing since the Mongol power was crushed by the Qing while Turkic Muslim culture and identity were tolerated or even promoted by the Qing.

The Qianlong Emperor explicitly commemorated the Qing conquest of the Dzungars as having reclaimed former territory in Xinjiang for "China", defining China as a multi-ethnic state, rejecting the idea that China only meant Han areas in "China proper", meaning that according to the Qing, both Han and non-Han peoples were part of "China", which included Xinjiang which the Qing conquered from the Dzungars. After the Qing were done conquering Dzungaria in 1759, they proclaimed that the new land which formerly belonged to the Dzungars was now absorbed into "China" (Dulimbai Gurun) in a Manchu language memorial. The Qing expounded on their ideology that they were bringing together the "outer" non-Han Chinese like the Inner Mongols, Eastern Mongols, Oirat Mongols, and Tibetans together with the "inner" Han Chinese, into "one family" united in the Qing state, showing that the diverse subjects of the Qing were all part of one family, the Qing used the phrase "Zhong Wai Yi Jia" 中外一家 or "Nei Wai Yi Jia" 內外一家 ("interior and exterior as one family"), to convey this idea of "unification" of the different peoples. In the Manchu official Tulisen's Manchu language account of his meeting with the Torghut leader Ayuka Khan, it was mentioned that while the Torghuts were unlike the Russians, the "people of the Central Kingdom" (dulimba-i gurun 中國, Zhongguo) were like the Torghut Mongols, and the "people of the Central Kingdom" referred to the Manchus.

The Inner Mongolian Chahar leader Ligdan Khan, a descendant of Genghis Khan, opposed and fought against the Qing until he died of smallpox in 1634. Thereafter, the Inner Mongols under his son Ejei Khan surrendered to the Qing and was given the title of Prince (Qin Wang, 親王), and Inner Mongolian nobility became closely tied to the Qing royal family and intermarried with them extensively. Ejei Khan died in 1661 and was succeeded by his brother Abunai. After Abunai showed disaffection with Manchu Qing rule, he was placed under house arrested in 1669 in Shenyang and the Kangxi Emperor gave his title to his son Borni. Abunai then bid his time and then he and his brother Lubuzung revolted against the Qing in 1675 during the Revolt of the Three Feudatories, with 3,000 Chahar Mongol followers joining in on the revolt. The revolt was put down within two months, the Qing then crushed the rebels in a battle on April 20, 1675, killing Abunai and all his followers. Their title was abolished, all Chahar Mongol royal males were executed even if they were born to Manchu Qing princesses, and all Chahar Mongol royal females were sold into slavery except the Manchu Qing princesses. The Chahar Mongols were then put under the direct control of the Qing Emperor unlike the other Inner Mongol leagues which maintained their autonomy.

==== Jindandao massacre of Mongols ====
Ordinary Mongols were not allowed to travel outside their own leagues. During the eighteenth century, growing numbers of Han Chinese settlers had illegally begun to move into the Inner Mongolian steppe. By 1791 there had been so many Han Chinese settlers in the Front Gorlos Banner that the jasak had petitioned the Qing government to legalize the status of the peasants who had already settled there. The first half of the 19th century saw the heyday of the Qing order. Both Inner and Outer Mongolia continued to supply the Qing armies with cavalry, although the government had tried to keep the Outer Mongols apart from the empire's wars in that century. Since the dynasty placed the Mongols well under its control, the government no longer feared them. At the same time, as the ruling Manchus had become increasingly sinicized and population pressure in China proper emerged, the dynasty began to abandon its earlier attempts to block Han Chinese trade penetration and settlement in the steppe. After all, Han Chinese economic penetration served the dynasty's interests, because it not only provided support of the government's Mongolian administrative apparatus but also bound the Mongols more tightly to the rest of the empire. The Qing administrators, increasing in league with Han Chinese trading firms, solidly supported Chinese commerce. There was little that ordinary Mongols, who remained in the banners and continued their lives as herdsmen, could do to protect themselves against the growing exactions that banner princes, monasteries, and Han creditors imposed upon them, and ordinary herdsmen had little resource against exorbitant taxation and levies. In the 19th century, agriculture had been spread in the steppe and pastureland was increasingly converted to agricultural use. Even during the 18th century a growing number of Han settlers had already illegally begun to move into the Inner Mongolian steppe and to lease land from monasteries and banner princes, slowly diminishing the grazing areas for the Mongols' livestock. While the alienation of pasture in this way was largely illegal, the practice continued unchecked. By 1852, Han Chinese merchants had deeply penetrated Inner Mongolia, and the Mongols had run up unpayable debts. The monasteries had taken over substantial grazing lands, and monasteries, merchants and banner princes had leased many pasture lands to Han Chinese as farmland, although there was also popular resentment against oppressive taxation, Han usurpers, shrinkage of pasture, as well as debts and abuse of the banner princes' authority. Northern parts of what are today's Chinese provinces of Shaanxi, Shanxi and Hebei were ethnically cleansed of Mongols, with the erasing of nomadic minorities legacies in these regions so as to dispel the notion of borderlands as traditionally Mongolian inhabited. Increasingly during the nineteenth century, the Manchurians were becoming increasingly sinicized themselves, and faced with the Russian threat, they began to encourage Han Chinese farmers to settle in both Mongolia and Manchuria. This policy was followed by subsequent governments. The railroads that were being built in these regions were especially useful to the Han Chinese settlers. Land was either sold by Mongol Princes, or leased to Han Chinese farmers, or simply taken away from the nomads and given to Han Chinese farmers. Many impoverished Mongols also began to take up farming in the steppe, renting farmlands from their banner princes or from Han merchant landlords who had acquired them for agriculture as settlement for debts. Qing rule with tacit continuous Han illegal settlement over the 18th and 19th centuries, had led to a wave of incidents culminating in Mongol ethnic cleansing and displacement.

All these incidents culminated in the Jindandao Incident, where an ethnic Han Chinese secret society called Jindandao (金丹道) rose up and revolted in Inner Mongolia in November 1891. The Chinese rebels massacred 150,000 Mongols and destroyed many Mongol lama temples before being suppressed by government forces in late December. The outbreak of the rebellion took place in November, 1891 when rebels attacked the government office of the Aukhan Banner. They slaughtered the jasagh (head) of the banner, Prince Daghchin, who was concurrently the head of the Juu Uda League, and vandalized his ancestral tomb. They quickly rampaged southward into the Ongniud banners (and Chifeng County within them), and then into the Kharachin Left Banner. Around the same time, another group of rebels captured Chaoyang County within the Tümed Right Banner, the Josutu League. They moved into the neighboring Tümed banner and two Kharachin banners while annihilating Mongol communities. They openly employed anti-Mongol and anti-dynastic slogans including "Defeat the Qing and wipe of the Mongols" (平清掃胡) and "Kill Mongols in revenge" (仇殺蒙古). The Jindandao devastated Mongol communities in the southeastern borderland and forced many Mongols to take refuge in northern banners. Anyway, the Qing attitude towards Han Chinese colonization of Mongolian lands grew more and more favourable under pressure of events, particularly after the Amur Annexation by Russia in 1860. This would reach a peak during the early 20th century, under the name of xinzheng or "New Administration". Several NGO and human rights groups monitor happening in the autonomous region today.

=== Communist China ===
During the Cultural Revolution, Mongol separatist political parties and ethnic Mongols were targeted and killed by the Red Guards throughout inner Mongolia; at least 346,000 ethnic Mongols were arrested, of which at least 27,900 were officially executed and another 120,000 were crippled. An even larger number of ethnic Mongols were tortured or beaten to death, died of sexual violence, worked to death in labour camps or committed suicide, but were unrecorded. Recent researchers estimate that the Red Guards killed about 100,000 to 300,000 Mongols during the Cultural Revolution.

Traditional Mongol lands within the PRC extend further than Inner Mongolia, often up to the old Ming border and further south and west in places like Gansu, Xinjiang the Datong area of Shaanxi and Kalgan. There are also remnants of Möngke Khan's grand army in Sichuan and Yunnan, yet little recognition of the Mongol legacy in these areas. There has been riots over what has been perceived by ethnic Mongols of increasing marginalisation by Han Chinese and cultural appropriation throat singing There has been continuing efforts by the CPC to dispel separatism and notions of Pan-Mongolism between the indigenous Mongols of China, with other Mongol groups.

== Prejudice elsewhere ==
The use of the term "Mongoloid" as a pejorative still pervades many cultures today, with stereotypes of Mongolians as superstitious alcoholics. Mongoloid is also used as a highly offensive slur against people with Down syndrome. Perhaps the image of Mongolians being barbaric or underdeveloped has pervaded in part to their nomadic lifestyle which has survived partly into modernity. Mongolic peoples have also received prejudice over the ages for their practice of traditional customs and Shamanism as backwards or paganistic, along with their historical willingness to embrace multiple faiths at the same time.

== Derogatory terms ==
=== In Korean ===
- Orangkae (Korean: 오랑캐) – literally "Barbarian", derogatory term used against Han, Mongol and Manchu peoples.

=== In Arabic ===
- مغولي - Translated: "Mongolian" or "Maghuli," used to describe an unintelligent brute. Not exclusively used against Mongolian people.

=== In Greek ===
- Μογγόλος - Translated: "Mongolian" or "Mongol," derogatory term used against Turkish people.

=== In Quebec French ===
- Kâliss de mongol - Translated: "Damn Mongolian" or "Mongol," derogatory term used against idiots.

== See also ==
- Anti-Chinese sentiment
- Anti-Russian sentiment
