= Genesis Theatre (Delta, British Columbia) =

Theatre in Delta, British Columbia, Canada

Coordinates: 49°5′7.87″N 123°5′5.24″W

The Genesis Theatre is a theatre located in Delta, British Columbia, right next to Delta Secondary School. The theatre opened in 1990. Genesis Theater has a max capacity of 414 people in 15 rows and 10 removable seats to facilitate wheelchairs. The Genesis Theater complex is a classical proscenium theater with a fly stage and contains:

- two dressing rooms, each with 16 make-up positions, a single shower and an adjoining washroom
- orchestra pit
- lighting and sound control rooms
- drama studio / rehearsal hall
- tiered music room
- Scene Shop
- lobby with box office, coat check / concession, washrooms
- foyer with ample display areas

The theatre has produced plays and musicals such as

- Macbeth (2008)
- The Boy Friend (2007)
- Little Shop of Horrors (2006)
- Two Gentlemen of Verona (2005)
- Crazy for You (2004)
- West Side Story (2003)
- Joseph and the Amazing Technicolor Dreamcoat (2002)
- Dracula Spectacula (2001)
- Oliver! (2000)
