= Songyuan =

Songyuan 松原市
- Prefecture-level city
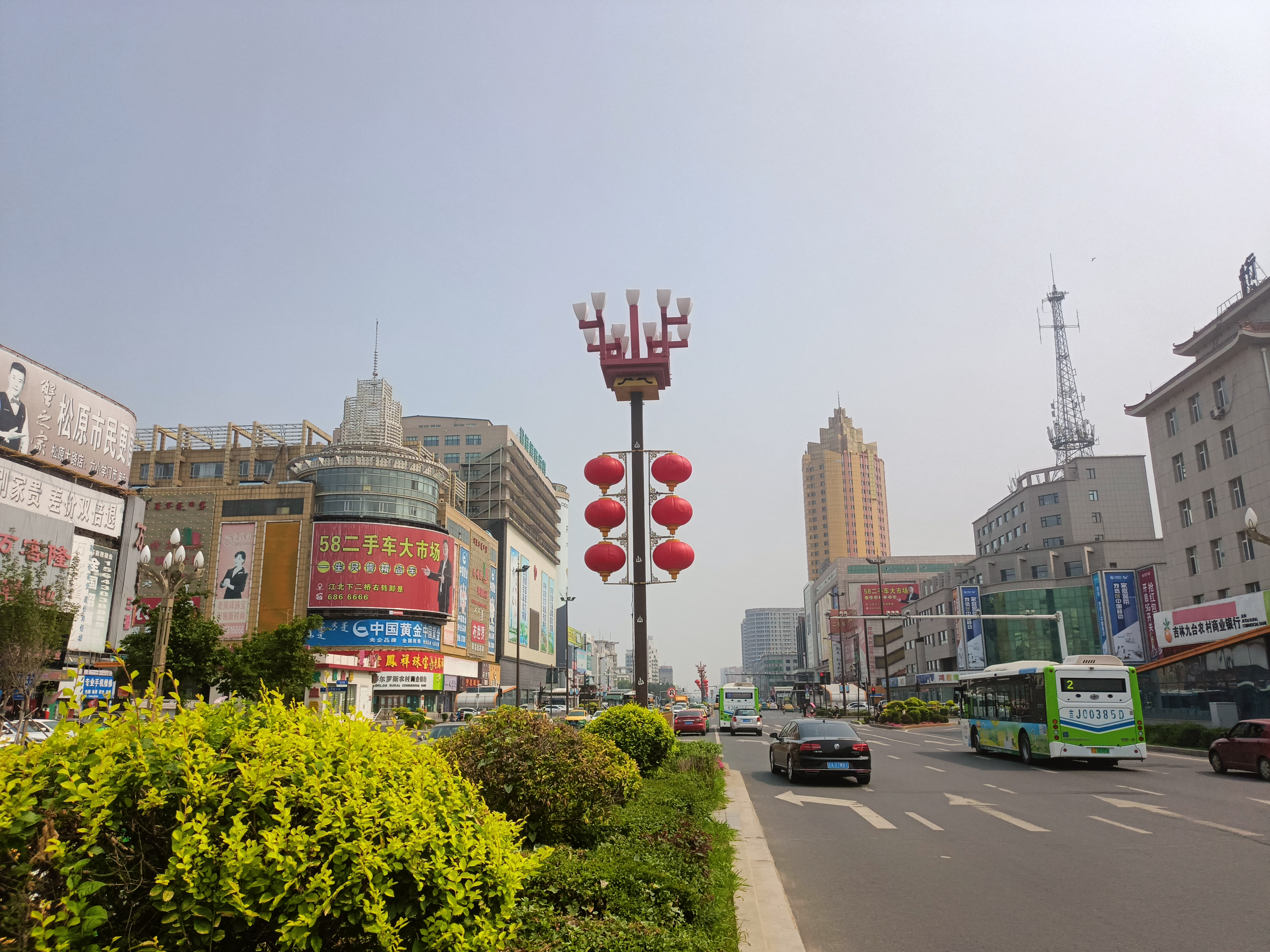
- Downtown Ningjiang

- Location of the city centre in Jilin
- Coordinates: 45°08′31″N 124°49′31″E
- Country: People's Republic of China
- Province: Jilin
- County-level divisions: 5
- Incorporated (city): 1992.6.6
- City seat: Ningjiang District

Government
  - Type: Prefecture-level city
  - CPC Songyuan Secretary: Wang Changsong (王常松)
  - Mayor: Li Xiangguo (李相国)

Area
  - Prefecture-level city: 22,034 km^{2} (8,507 sq mi)
  - Urban (2017): 81.80 km^{2} (31.58 sq mi)
- Elevation: 133 m (436 ft)

Population (2010)
  - Prefecture-level city: 2,881,082
  - Density: 130.76/km^{2} (338.66/sq mi)
  - Urban (2017): 495,900

GDP
  - Prefecture-level city: CN¥ 163.7 billion US$ 26.3 billion
  - Per capita: CN¥ 58,841; US$ 9,447
- Time zone: UTC+8 (China Standard)
- Postal code: 138000
- Area code: 0438
- ISO 3166 code: CN-JL-07
- Licence plates: 吉J
- Website: jlsy.gov.cn

Songyuan (Chinese: 松原; pinyin: Sōngyuán) is a prefecture-level city in west-central Jilin province, China.

== History ==
Even though the present city of Songyuan is predominantly modern in appearance, the area has a long history dating back to the Neolithic age. The city was part of the ancient Buyeo Kingdom 2000 years ago, as well as Balhae 1000 years ago.

During much of the Qing era, an important military and administrative center, known as Boduna (伯都納) was located in the Songyuan area, on the right bank of the Sungari (Songhua) River, in what is today the Ningjiang District of the city. The name was transcribed by the Europeans as Bodune, Po-tu-no, or Petuna. The Boduna fortress was originally constructed in 1693, some 25 li (15 km) east of today's Songyuan central city area. In the late Qing, the administrative center moved to Xincheng (新城, "New city") - the name still preserved by the Xincheng Township of the Ningjiang District, in the part of the Songyan's central urbank area on the right bank of the Sungari. As of the early 20th century Xincheng was the capital of a prefecture within the then Jilin Province, and had a population of around 30,000.

At the beginning of the 20th century, Sun Yat-sen proposed building a transportation hub where the Songhua River and the Nen River meet, which materialized as the current city of Songyuan. Authorized by the national government, Songyuan was founded as a prefecture-level city in 1992. Since then it has undergone rapid modernization, thanks in part to the area's profitable oil companies.

In 2007, it was chosen to be one of the cities for the 2008 Olympic torch relay, and was the first relay stop of the province, on which occasion more than 300 media companies, domestic and international, reported on the city. In the same year, the National Astronomical Observatories of Chinese Academy named a meteor after Songyuan, an honor bestowed only on eight cities in the nation.

In 2009, several exam cheating scandals gained the city nationwide media attention. In July, police arrested thirty-four suspects on charges of selling electronic devices to high school students which would have enabled them to cheat on the national college entrance exam. Police confiscated several hundred devices from the suspects, two of whom were local high school teachers.

== Geography ==
Songyuan is in the intersection of the Province of Jilin, Heilongjiang and Inner Mongolia. Located in the middle west of Jilin Province, at the center of the Northeast China, the city covers 22,000 square kilometres (8,500 sq mi) with a population of 2.8 million.

There are 7,600 square kilometres (2,900 sq mi) of arable land, with an annual food production of about 6 million tons, a quarter of the total production of Jilin Province. The urban area is 71.76 square kilometres (27.71 sq mi). The second Songyuan River crosses the city, which makes it one of the few not completely developed riverside cities in the nation.

=== Climate ===
Songyuan has a monsoon-influenced, humid continental climate (Köppen Dwa), with long (lasting from November to March), very cold, windy, but dry winters due to the influence of the Siberian high, and hot, humid summers, due to the East Asian monsoon. The coldest month, January, averages −16.1 °C (3.0 °F), while the warmest month, July, averages 23.7 °C (74.7 °F); the annual mean is 5.8 °C (42.4 °F). Over two-thirds of the annual precipitation falls from June to August alone.

Climate data for Songyuan, elevation 140 m (460 ft), (1991–2020 normals, extremes 1971–2010)
Month	Jan	Feb	Mar	Apr	May	Jun	Jul	Aug	Sep	Oct	Nov	Dec	Year
Record high °C (°F)	5.0 (41.0)	14.9 (58.8)	22.1 (71.8)	31.1 (88.0)	35.7 (96.3)	38.1 (100.6)	36.6 (97.9)	37.5 (99.5)	32.3 (90.1)	28.0 (82.4)	19.0 (66.2)	10.6 (51.1)	38.1 (100.6)
Mean daily maximum °C (°F)	−10.0 (14.0)	−4.1 (24.6)	4.5 (40.1)	14.8 (58.6)	22.2 (72.0)	27.3 (81.1)	28.9 (84.0)	27.4 (81.3)	22.4 (72.3)	13.4 (56.1)	1.2 (34.2)	−8.2 (17.2)	11.7 (53.0)
Daily mean °C (°F)	−15.7 (3.7)	−10.3 (13.5)	−1.4 (29.5)	8.8 (47.8)	16.4 (61.5)	21.9 (71.4)	24.3 (75.7)	22.6 (72.7)	16.5 (61.7)	7.6 (45.7)	−3.7 (25.3)	−13.3 (8.1)	6.1 (43.1)
Mean daily minimum °C (°F)	−20.5 (−4.9)	−15.8 (3.6)	−6.9 (19.6)	2.7 (36.9)	10.6 (51.1)	16.8 (62.2)	20.1 (68.2)	18.4 (65.1)	11.3 (52.3)	2.7 (36.9)	−7.9 (17.8)	−17.5 (0.5)	1.2 (34.1)
Record low °C (°F)	−36.5 (−33.7)	−36.6 (−33.9)	−24.2 (−11.6)	−12.0 (10.4)	−4.3 (24.3)	4.4 (39.9)	10.0 (50.0)	7.7 (45.9)	−1.9 (28.6)	−14.4 (6.1)	−27.0 (−16.6)	−33.7 (−28.7)	−36.6 (−33.9)
Average precipitation mm (inches)	2.5 (0.10)	2.7 (0.11)	7.7 (0.30)	13.3 (0.52)	46.6 (1.83)	74.3 (2.93)	113.4 (4.46)	99.8 (3.93)	47.5 (1.87)	18.8 (0.74)	9.0 (0.35)	5.2 (0.20)	440.8 (17.34)
Average precipitation days (≥ 0.1 mm)	3.6	2.6	4.3	4.9	9.5	11.8	12.9	10.7	8.0	5.9	4.2	5.1	83.5
Average snowy days	5.3	4.5	5.6	1.7	0.1	0	0	0	0	1.5	5.2	7.5	31.4
Average relative humidity (%)	65	57	48	44	50	62	75	75	66	59	60	66	61
Mean monthly sunshine hours	188.6	211.1	248.6	244.9	258.9	255.3	245.0	243.7	247.2	218.3	177.6	168.7	2,707.9
Percentage possible sunshine	66	71	67	60	56	55	52	57	67	65	63	62	62
Source 1: China Meteorological Administration
Source 2: Weather China

== Administrative divisions ==
Songyuan has one district and four counties:

There are three provincial level development areas: Songyuan economy and technology development area, Songyuan agricultural new technology development area and the Chagan Lake tourism development area.

Map
#	Name	Hanzi	Hanyu Pinyin	Population (2003 est.)	Area (km^{2})	Density (/km^{2})
1	Ningjiang District	宁江区	Níngjiāng Qū	520,000	1,269	410
2	Fuyu	扶余市	Fúyú Shì	770,000	4,464	172
3	Changling County	长岭县	Chánglǐng Xiàn	640,000	5,787	111
4	Qian'an County	乾安县	Qián'ān Xiàn	300,000	3,522	85
5	Qian Gorlos Mongol Autonomous County	前郭尔罗斯蒙古族自治县	Qiánguō'ěrluósī Měnggǔzú Zìzhìxiàn	580,000	5,117	113

== Economy ==
In 2006, Songyuan had a revenue of 47.4 billion yuan, with a profit of 4.5 billion yuan, the third of the province in terms of overall economic achievement. In 2007, the total revenue was expected to be 60 billion Yuan, with a profit of 6.5 billion Yuan.

Songyuan is located on the Songnen Plain, with the sixth largest land-based oil field of China, Jilin Oil Field, located in the city. Currently ascertained are 1.134 billion tons of oil and 100 billion cubic meters of natural gas. Last year Jilin Oil Field production exceeded 6 million tons of oil and gas.

Songyuan also sits on China's Golden Corn Belt, and is a national commercial food base. Jilin is a big food-production province, and Songyuan is a big food-production city. In 2006 the city was ranked second in the province in food production, with a total output of 6.412 million tons of food, of which 4.808 million tons are corn.

There are also several rivers and lakes in and around the city, which yield more than forty billion cubic meters of water. There are 1.557 billion cubic meters of water reserve, which can meet the need of water-demanding industry.

The city is in the east end of the Kerqin grassland, with 53,000 km^{2} (20,000 sq mi) of grassland yielding 0.3 million tons of grass annually. It is a natural land for pastoral industry.

There are twenty important tourist destinations near the city. These include Chagan Lake, which is one of the ten largest fresh water lakes of the nation, Qianan Forest, as well as temples and monuments in the surrounding areas.

Taking advantage of abundant materials, special locations and easy transportation, the city has reserved and developed many important projects. It is gradually building an industry of oil production, oil refinement, oil chemistry, biological chemistry, agricultural products, pharmaceutical products, textiles, machinery, and electricity.

== Transport ==
There are five railways and six provincial or national highways passing through the city. It takes ninety minutes to reach the Changchun or Harbin airport by taxi. Several trains depart daily for Changchun and Harbin, cities which can also be reached through waterway. Songyuan Chaganhu Airport has been constructed. A circle drawn with Songyuan as center, and with a radius of 200 kilometers, will cover a population of 31 million, with Songyuan being the important transportation hub and commerce center of the northeastern China and Inner Mongolia.

Songyuan Port, which is the largest inland river port in Jilin Province, have an annual throughput capacity of 800,000 tons.
