= Lian Ji =

Chinese politician (born 1955)

- 连辑

President of the Chinese National Academy of Arts
- In office February 2016 – July 2018
- Preceded by: Wang Wenzhang
- Succeeded by: Han Ziyong

Head of the Publicity Department of the Gansu Provincial Committee of the Chinese Communist Party
- In office October 2011 – January 2016
- Preceded by: Li Xiaojie
- Succeeded by: Liang Yanshun

Personal details
- Born: October 1955 (age 70–71) Qinyuan County, Shanxi, China
- Party: Chinese Communist Party (1975-2026, expelled)
- Education: Liaoning University; Tsinghua University

Lian Ji (Chinese: 连辑; born October 1955) is a former Chinese politician, who served as the president of the Chinese National Academy of Arts.

== Career ==
Lian was born in Qinyuan County, Shanxi, in October 1955. His career is most at Inner Mongolia.

In 1974, Lian was enrolled to the 4th Middle School of Linhe, which served as a teacher. During the Down to the Countryside Movement, he was a sent-down youth in Xiaozhao Commune and Danda Commune in Linhe City between 1976 and 1978. In March 1978, he was enrolled to Liaoning University, which majored in Chinese language. After graduating in 1982, he was served as an officer of the Publicity Department of the Inner Mongolia Autonomous Regional Committee of the Chinese Communist Party. He was served as the secretary of the Youth League Committee of the Inner Mongolia Autonomous Region Directly Subordinate Organs, and the general office secretary in 1989.

In 1991, Lian was appointed as the standing member and the secretary general of the Hohhot Municipal Committee of the Chinese Communist Party. He was served as the deputy mayor of Hohhot in 1993, and transferred to Hulunbuir League in 1998, who served as the government head of the League. He promoted to the party secretary in 2001 (Hulunbuir League was reorganized into prefecture-level city in October 2001, and the Hulunbuir Municipal Party Committee was established in February 2002).

In 2003, Lian was promoted to the vice chairman of Inner Mongolia. He was also served as the president of Inner Mongolia University between 2006 and 2010 concurrently.

In September 2011, Lian was transferred to Gansu, which served as the head of the publicity department of the Gansu Provincial Committee of the Chinese Communist Party.

In February 2016, Lian was appointed as the president of the Chinese National Academy of Arts. But he was still remained the sub-provincial rank treatment. During this period, he was made takeover and reorganization Yanhuang Chunqiu, a monthly journal.

== Investigation ==
On 3 February 2026, Lian was suspected of "serious violations of laws and regulations" by the Central Commission for Discipline Inspection (CCDI), the party's internal disciplinary body, and the National Supervisory Commission, the highest anti-corruption agency of China. Lian was expelled from the party on 9 October 2026.

Party political offices
| Preceded by Li Xiaojie | Head of the Publicity Department of the Gansu Provincial Committee of the Chinese Communist Party; 2011–2016 | Succeeded by Liang Yanshun |
Educational offices
| Preceded by Wang Wenzhang | President of the Chinese National Academy of Arts; 2016–2018 | Succeeded by Han Ziyong |
| Preceded by Bou Shorgan | President of Inner Mongolia University; 2006–2010 | Succeeded by Chen Guoqing |
