= Inner Mongolia Education Press =

Chinese publishing company

Chinese name
- Chinese: 內蒙古教育出版社
Transcriptions
Standard Mandarin
- Hanyu Pinyin: Nèi Měnggǔ Jiàoyù Chūbǎnshè

Mongolian name
- Mongolian Cyrillic: Öbür mongγul-un surγan kümüǰil-ün keblel-ün qoriy-a

The Inner Mongolia Education Press (IMEP) is a publishing company in the Inner Mongolia autonomous region of the People's Republic of China. They were established in 1960. They publish roughly 2,000 items per year, including translations of Japanese, Russian, English, and other foreign-language works, as well as two periodicals in Mongolian. They work with the Mongolian Language Educational Materials Editing Office for Schools and Universities (大中专蒙古文教材编审办公室) to print and publish roughly 235,000 copies of 500 editions of Mongolian-language educational materials, which are distributed and used in schools in eight different provinces in China.

== See also ==
- Inner Mongolia People's Publishing House
