= Li Bo (ecologist) =

Chinese phytoecologist

- Born: April 15, 1929
- Died: May 21, 1998 (aged 69); Hungary
- Occupation: Phytoecologist

Li Bo (Chinese: 李博; pinyin: Lǐ Bó; 15 April 1929 – 21 May 1998) was a Chinese phytoecologist, professor at Inner Mongolia University, and member of the Chinese Academy of Sciences.

With cooperation from Beijing University, Li was in charge of a state project named "The Application of Remote Sensing Technology to the Investigation of Pasture Resources in Inner Mongolia", which made contributions to the utilization and protection of grasslands.

Li died in a traffic accident in Hungary in 1998.

== Bibliography ==
- Li, Bo. 1962. “The basic types of regional vegetation and ecology-geography,”. (in Chinese), Huhehaote, University of Inner Mongolia vol.1, no.4.
- Jiang, Shu and Li, Bo. 1988. Natural environments of Baiinxile, Xilinhot, Inner Mongolia (Report of the field study under the Monbusho International Scientific Research Program). 菅平高原実験センター研究報告, No. 9. 筑波大学菅平高原実験センター.
- Li, Bo. (eds.). 1990. Research on natural resources and environment in Ordos plateau, Inner Mongolia. Beijing: Scientific Press.
- Li, Bo and Yang, Chi (eds.) 1995. Research on the Biological Diversity in Grassland. Inner Mongolia Press.
