= Katso language =

Loloish language spoken in China

Katso
- Kazhuo, Khatso
- Native to: China
- Ethnicity: Khatso
- Native speakers: 5,432 (2010)
- Language family: Sino-Tibetan: Tibeto-Burman; Lolo–Burmese; Loloish; Kazhuoish; Katso

Language codes
- ISO 639-3: kaf
- Glottolog: kats1235
- ELP: Kazhuo; Khatso

Katso, also known as Kazhuo or Khatso (autonyms: kʰɑ⁵⁵tso³¹, kɑ⁵⁵tso³¹; Chinese: 卡卓), is a Loloish language of Xingmeng Township (兴蒙乡), Tonghai County, Yunnan, China. The speakers are officially classified as ethnic Mongols, although they speak a Loloish language. Over 99% of the residents township speak Katso, and Katso is used as a means of daily communication, though it is fading amongst younger speakers.

Katso speakers call themselves kʰɑ⁵⁵tso³¹ (卡卓) or kɑ⁵⁵tso³¹ (嘎卓) (Kazhuoyu Yanjiu).

== Phonology ==
Katso is young, being no older than 750 years old. Lama (2012) lists the following sound changes from Proto-Loloish as Kazhuoish innovations.

- *x- > s-
- *mr- > z-

=== Consonants ===
The consonants for Katso according to Donlay (2019) are as follows:

		Labial	Alveolar		(Alveolo-) Palatal	Velar	Glottal
		Labial	plain	sibilant	(Alveolo-) Palatal	Velar	Glottal
Nasal	voiced	m	n		ɲ	ŋ	
Stop/ Affricate	unvoiced	p	t	ts	tɕ	k	
Stop/ Affricate	aspirated	pʰ	tʰ	tsʰ	tɕʰ	kʰ	
Fricative	unvoiced	f		s	ɕ	x	h
Fricative	voiced	v		z		ɣ	
Approximant	voiced			l	j	w	

Consonants may not appear as clusters, and there are no coda consonants in Katso. The consonants /m/ and /ŋ/ can serve as syllable nuclei. Some authors like Mu (2002) and Dai (2008) describe an additional phoneme /ʑ/.

=== Vowels ===
Katso does not exhibit certain vowel qualities common in other Loloish languages like nasal vowels or the laryngeally-constricted vowels found in Nuosu.

	Front	Central	Back	
	Front	Central	unrounded	rounded
Syllabic Consonant		z̩ v̩		
Close	i		ɯ	
Mid	ɛ		ɤ	ɔ
Low	a			

The two fricated vowels, /z̩/ (transcribed as /ɿ/ in Sinologist convention) and /v̩/ are described by Donlay (2019) as being a high central apical vowel and a high central fricative vowel respectively. The two both exhibit high degrees of turbulence and frication. The phoneme /z̩/ may only occur after /s, z, ts, tsʰ/, and contrasts with /i/ (see tsz̩⁵³ "basket" / tsi⁵³ "to cut (with scissors)". The high central fricative /v̩/, compared to its fricative counterpart /v/, is pronounced with the articulators more open forming a more resonant quality. In some instances it may lose sufficient frication to be similar to [u] or [ʋ].

Donlay identifies 8 diphthongs, /iɛ ia io ɛi uo ua ui au/ and two triphthongs /iau uɛi uai/, out of which /io/, /ia/, and /uai/ mainly occur in loanwords from Chinese.

=== Tonemes ===
Katso has eight tones, three level tonemes (55, 44, 33), two rising tones (35, 24), two falling tones (53, 31) and a "peaking" low-falling-rising tone. The 44 toneme only occurs in a scant few words, mostly of Mandarin Chinese origin.
