= Inner Mongolia People's Publishing House =

Chinese name
- Simplified Chinese: 内蒙古人民出版社
- Traditional Chinese: 內蒙古人民出版社
Transcriptions
Standard Mandarin
- Hanyu Pinyin: Nèi Měnggǔ Rénmín Chūbǎnshè

Mongolian name
- Mongolian script: ᠥᠪᠦᠷ ᠮᠣᠩᠭᠣᠯ ᠤᠨ ᠠᠷᠠᠳ ᠤᠨ ᠬᠡᠪᠯᠡᠯ ᠦᠨ ᠬᠣᠷᠢᠶ᠎ᠠ
Transcriptions
- SASM/GNC: Obur Mônggôl-ûn Arad-ûn Heblel-un Hôriya

The Inner Mongolia People's Publishing House (IMPPH) is a publishing company based in Hohhot, the capital of the Inner Mongolia autonomous region of the People's Republic of China. It was established in 1951. Their president is Wang Dongsheng (王东生).

== Publications ==
IMPPH publish original works in Chinese and Mongolian, as well as translations of English works.

== Incidents ==
IMPPH have been accused of violations of intellectual property rights on various occasions. In 2001, there appeared a book with the imprint of IMPPH, whose author's pseudonym, title, cover art, and content bore a close resemblance to Han Han's Triple Doors; however, a spokesperson for IMPPH denied that the company had actually printed those books, instead claiming that another party was misusing their name. A 2004 article by the China Youth Daily also claimed that the IMPPH's 2001 book about chengyu plagiarised roughly 500,000 words from a similar book published four years earlier by the China Youth Press.

In 2004, the IMPPH were also fined by the General Administration of Press and Publication for trading in book registration numbers. They sold the book registration numbers to a publishing company in Jiangxi, enabling the latter to carry out illegal publication activities.

== See also ==
- Inner Mongolia University Press
- Inner Mongolia Education Press
