= Uudam =

Chinese singer

- ᠠᠭᠤᠳᠠᠮ
- Born: 9 September 1999 (age 27); Hulunbuir, Inner Mongolia Autonomous Region, China
- Years active: 2010-present

Uudam Sonam, also Wudamu (Mongolian: Уудам, romanized: Uudam; simplified Chinese: 乌达木; traditional Chinese: 烏達木; pinyin: Wūdámù, born 9 September 1999) is a Chinese singer of Mongol ethnicity, who participated in the 2011 season of China's Got Talent. He is also a former member of the Hulunbuir Children's Choir.

== Background ==
Uudam was born on September 9, 1999, in Hulunbuir in Inner Mongolia (Autonomous Region in northern China). His mother died in a road accident when he was eight years old. A few years later when he was eleven his father also died in another car accident. He was then fostered by Buren Bayaer, the director of the Hulunbuir Children's Choir which Uudam was part of and a noted Chinese singer (Quintessenso Choir).

Buren and Wurina have two daughters, Nurma (alternately, Norma, Nurman, or Norman) and Enigma. Uudam also has a biological older sister named Sue Neil, who is around three years older than him.

Uudam attended Delta Secondary School in Delta, Canada for two years until 2017.

Uudam goes by Kevin as his English name and also went by Michael for a few years. He now attends university in Canada.

== China's Got Talent ==
Uudam participated as a contestant in the 2011 season of China's Got Talent. Performing in his native Mongolian language, he sang the song, "Mother in the Dream". He also performed a song with his adoptive parents, Buren and Wurina Bayaer. He appeared in the background of Buren Bayaer's video, "Take Me To The Prairie".

== Discography ==
- 2011: "Mother far away" (Chinese: 梦中的额吉, "Meng zhong de eji" ) – Guangdong Audio B006G79YT4, CD (5 titles) + DVD (music video "Mother in the Dream")

The cover photo of this album http://ent.southcn.com/8/images/attachement/jpg/site4/20111125/0016ec7d751a103941d448.jpg Including 5 songs:Mother in the dream(梦中的额吉)

The running horse (奔驰的马)

A song dedicated to father (献给父亲的歌)

Uncle Bateer (巴特尔舅舅)

Taryat Miden (Thousand-Mile Express/Thousand-Kilometer Horse) (塔力雅图麦丹)

- In 2015 he sang a new song, "Old mother" (苍老的母亲) on China's Got Talent's stage during Chinese Spring Festival.
- (Music video "Mother in the Dream" (梦中的额吉) = (梦中的额吉)

== Filmography ==
- 2011: The Men with Blue Dots (蓝斑人) (mong. Хөх толбот хүмүүс, "Khökh Tolbot Khümüüs") – as child Ganbaa
- 2012: Night Blooming (chin. 隔窗有眼) (horror movie) – as the leading actor in the role of 小虎 (Xiao Hu, “Little Tiger”)
- 2013: Uudam Charity Mini Movie "Spring-Bound School Bus" (开往春天的校车) (short movie)
