= The Men with Blue Dots =

The Men with Blue Dots (Хөх толбот хүмүүс)
- Directed by: Dorjsuren Shadav
- Produced by: DOZ Entertainment
- Starring: Battor; Erdenebayar
- Cinematography: Otgonzorig
- Music by: Erdenebat
- Release date: 2011
- Running time: 100 minutes
- Country: Mongolia
- Language: Mongolian

The Men with Blue Dots (mon. Хөх толбот хүмүүс, latin script "Hoh Tolbot Humuus") is a Mongolian 2012 movie drama directed by Dorjsuren Shadav.

== Plot ==
The film tells the story of a young man who has decided to go abroad to France. There he survived the cultural shock and collided with reality, because he had never left his native village in Mongolia.

== Cast ==
- T. Erdenebayar as Gunbold
- P. Battor as Jaamaa
- A. Mungunzul as Ankhmaa
- C. Tumurbaatar as Ganbaa
- Sunam Uudam as Ganbaa baga nas
