= Buren Bayar =

Chinese singer

- ᠪᠦᠷᠢᠨᠪᠠᠶᠠᠷ
- Born: 6 March 1960; New Barag Left Banner, Hulunbuir, Inner Mongolia, China
- Died: 19 September 2018 (aged 58); Hailar District, Hulunbuir, Inner Mongolia, China
- Occupations: Singer; songwriter; composer; host
- Years active: 1978–2018
- Spouse: Wurina (married 1989)

Buren Bayar

Chinese name
- Traditional Chinese: 布仁巴雅爾
- Simplified Chinese: 布仁巴雅尔
Transcriptions
Standard Mandarin
- Hanyu Pinyin: Bùrén Bāyáěr

Mongolian name
- Mongolian Cyrillic: ᠪᠦᠷᠢᠨᠪᠠᠶᠠᠷ
Transcriptions
- SASM/GNC: Bürinbayar

Buren Bayar (6 March 1960 – 19 September 2018) was a Chinese singer, composer and journalist from Inner Mongolia. He was an ethnic Mongol.

== Early life ==
Bayar displayed musical talent as a child. His parents and neighbors encouraged him to perform in front of the local community when he was six years old. His official musical education did not begin until age fifteen when he joined a school musical troupe. This is where he was introduced to different types of music including Mongolian songs, Revolutionary songs and Peking Opera. His song "Lucky Treasures", written in 1994, became popular in China. The song, originally, sung in Mongolian, was translated to Mandarin Chinese (simplified Chinese: 吉祥三宝; traditional Chinese: 吉祥三寶; pinyin: Jixiang sanbao) and was released shortly after.

Bayar and his wife Wurina were directors of the Hulunbuir Children's Choir. Uudam, their adopted son, was a singer in the choir. Their daughter, Nuurma, is a singer in China. Uudam and Nuurma's cousin Enigma is also a singer.

Bayar died on September 19, 2018, at the age of 58 due to a cardiac infarction.

== Discography ==
- 1997: "Чандмань (Wishfulling Jewel)" (simplified Chinese: 吉祥三宝; traditional Chinese: 吉祥三寶; pinyin: Jixiang sanbao) - audio cassette
- "Миний аав Улаанбаатарт байна (My father is in Ulaanbaatar)" (Chinese: 乌兰巴托的爸爸; pinyin: Wulanbatou de baba)
- 2011: "The Moon and The Stars" - ISBN 978-7-7999-1270-7

== Videos ==
- "Take me to the Prairie" (Chinese: 带我去草原吧; pinyin: Dai wo qu caoyuan ba)
- "Father's Prairie, Mother's River" (Chinese: 父亲的草原母亲的河; pinyin: Fuqin de caoyuan muqin de he)
