= Gorlos Mongols =

Gorlos
- Territories of the Gorlos in 1911

Regions with significant populations

Languages
- Southern Mongolian dialect

Religion
- Buddhism, Mongolian shamanism, Atheism

Related ethnic groups
- Mongols, Southern Mongols

The Gorlos (Mongolian: ᠭᠣᠷᠯᠣᠰ; Горлос; simplified Chinese: 郭尔罗斯部; traditional Chinese: 郭爾羅斯部) are a Mongol subgroup in Qian Gorlos Mongol Autonomous County, China.

== Ethnonym ==
According to Ochir, ethnonym Gorlos has a common origin with another Mongolian ethnonym Khori.

== History ==
The Gorlos Mongols represents one of the oldest tribes that were part of the Darlikin branch of the Khamag Mongols. In the 12th century they lived on the western slopes of the Khingan ridge in the vicinity of the Khongirad and Ikires tribes. Some of them became part of the Khalkha Mongols and Buryat Mongols.

The Gorlos Mongols living in the territory of Qian Gorlos Mongol Autonomous County in China are descendants of the subjects of Qasar and his descendants.

== See also ==
- Demographics of China
- List of medieval Mongolian tribes and clans
