= Jilin oil field =

Oil field in Songyuan, China

Jilin oil field is an oil field located in Songyuan district, in the western plain of Jilin province, China. Its exploration and development cover the southern Songliao Plain and Yitong River basin within Jilin province. Its oil production exceeds 7 million tons per year and is ranked as No.9 among the land-based Chinese oilfields.

The exploration of Jilin oil field begun in 1955. It has an oil-bearing area of 1384.3 km^{2}. It has been proven to have a natural gas-bearing area of 118.9 km^{2} with proven gas reserves exceeding 50 billion cubic meters.

== See also ==
- Petroleum industry in the People's Republic of China
- List of oil fields
