= China Youth Publishing House =

Chinese publishing house

China Youth Publishing House 中国青年出版社
- Status: Active
- Founded: January 1954
- Headquarters location: Beijing
- Owner(s): Central Committee of the Communist Youth League of China
- Official website: www.cyp.com.cn

China Youth Publishing House (traditional Chinese: 中國青年出版社; simplified Chinese: 中国青年出版社), commonly known as China Youth Press, abbreviated as CYP, is a Beijing-based publishing house in the People's Republic of China, directly under the leadership of the Central Committee of the Communist Youth League of China (CCCYLC, 共青团中央). It is a comprehensive youth reading press for the whole of China.

== History ==
In the autumn of 1949, the Chinese New Democracy Youth League (中国新民主主义青年团) set up a publishing committee, and in January 1950, the Youth Press (青年出版社) was formally established. In 1953, the General Administration of Press and Publication and Propaganda Department of the Chinese Communist Party proposed a merger between the Youth Press and the Kaiming Bookstore (开明书店), which was founded in 1926, renaming it China Youth Press.

== Important published books ==
- The Chongqing talks (重庆谈判), 1994.
- Chinese Contemporary Diplomatic History (中国当代外交史), 2002.
- Advanced Artificial Intelligence (记忆鲜红), 2002.
- The Prelude to the Historical Turning Point: Deng Xiaoping in 1975 (历史转折的前奏：邓小平在一九七五), 2004.
- The Change: The Whole Story of “Seven-Thousand-People Meeting” (变局：七千人大会始末), 2006.
- Praise You - Barack Obama's Letter To His Daughter (赞美你：奥巴马给女儿的信), 2001.
