= Delta Secondary School (Delta, British Columbia) =

Delta Secondary

Location
- 4615 51 Street; Delta, British Columbia, V4K 2V8; Canada; 49°5′9.8″N 123°5′2.88″W

Information
- School type: Public, high school
- Motto: Take each Stride with Pacer Pride!
- Founded: 1912
- School board: School District 37 Delta
- Area trustee: Laura Dixon
- School number: 3737003
- Principal: Mr. Rick Mesich
- Staff: 94
- Grades: 8-12
- Enrollment: 1147 (2019/20)
- Language: English
- Area: Ladner
- Colours: Green, Black, White
- Mascot: Cecil the Pacer (horse)
- Team name: Delta Pacers
- Website: de.deltasd.bc.ca
- Last updated: January 8, 2021

Delta Secondary is a public high school in Ladner, British Columbia, Canada. DSS is located in the historic village of Ladner, B.C. With a student enrolment of approximately 1,150 students (grades 8 to 12), it is the third-largest school in School District 37 Delta.

== History ==
King George V High School, the first high school in Delta, was located on the present site of the Ladner Community Centre. The first two rooms of the school were built in 1912, with a third room added in 1916. The school closed in 1938 having had almost 500 students graduate during the life of the school.

In 1938, Delta Central School, originally built in 1926 and used as an elementary school (grade 1–8), was enlarged and updated for senior students while a new elementary school was built on the same plot of land, the site of DSS today. A new gym separated the two schools.

The official opening of the "Ladner Elementary and Junior/Senior High School Centre" took place in April 1939.

Between 1938 and 1969, there were at least ten additions to the school. In 1963, a new Ladner Elementary School opened nearby. By 1972, the old elementary school building had become known as Delta Jr. Secondary while the Central School building (B block) and various additions made up the Delta Sr. Secondary, two separate schools on the same site. In 1975, the schools were amalgamated into one school, known as Delta Secondary School. It wasn't until 1984, with the building of the art wing that the schools were physically joined. In 1990, the Genesis Theatre was built.

In 1992/93, the design for the present school was approved. The B Block (Central School) building was demolished in 1992. In October 1994, construction began on the new school, with the main office and counsellors' office being completed first. The rest of the old senior school was demolished in May/June 1995 and the new quadrangle with 21 classrooms, 7 science labs, 4 computer labs and a classroom for students in special education was built. Following this, more demolition and renovation followed, including a new daycare area, food and textile room renovations, construction of the CAD lab, and the completion of the drama area. The total cost of these renovations was $12.6 million. Due to lack of further funding, the last phase of construction (demolition and rebuilding of the north gym) is on hold. On June 2, 1998, a formal dedication of the redevelopment of the school was held. The ceremony was attended by representatives from the school board and the school district.

Delta Central School was the original school located on the current site of Delta Secondary. It started accepting secondary students in 1938. In 1990, the oldest structure remaining on the site is the West gymnasium In late summer 2003, DSS finished construction of its newest building; a brand new, seismically upgraded gymnasium.

== Notable alumni ==
- Uudam, Mongolian singer who attended Delta Secondary School.
- Will Sasso (most famous for his work on MADtv) attended Delta Secondary School.
- Jason Priestley (most famous for his work on Beverly Hills, 90210) attended Delta Secondary School.
- James Paxton (pitcher for the Boston Red Sox) attended Delta Secondary School.
- Andrew McBride former captain of the Calgary Roughnecks
- Ian Paton (BC Liberal MLA for Delta South) graduated from Delta Secondary School.
- Ivan Decker (2018 Juno Award winner Comedy Album of the Year) graduated from Delta Secondary School.
