= Bou Shorgan =

Chinese biologist (1940–2015)

Bou Shorgan (Mongolian: ᠰᠢᠭᠤᠷᠭᠠᠨ, шуурган, Chinese: 旭日干, 24 August 1940 – 24 December 2015) was a Chinese reproductive biologist.

== Biography ==
Bou Shorgan was born in Horqin Right Front Banner, Hinggan League, Inner Mongolia in 1940. In 1984, when studying for his doctoral degree in Japan, Shorgan successfully performed in vitro fertilization of sheep and goat, the first in the world. He subsequently returned to China and created the Center for Experimental Zoology in the Inner Mongolia University. He became the President of Inner Mongolia University in 1993, making the university enter China's 211 project, and a member of the Chinese Academy of Engineering in 1995. He became vice-president of the Chinese Academy of Engineering in 2010. He attended the 10th and 11th Chinese People's Political Consultative Conferences.

Shorgan established a set of procedures for mass production of sheep and goat embryo with in vitro fertilization, for which he became known as "father of test tube sheep of China", and observed and recorded the full process of sheep fertilization. He authored Fauna of Inner Mongolia.

== Awards ==
- National Science and Technology Progress Award, Second Class. (2001)
- HLHL Science and Technology Progress Award. (1996)
