= Sichuan Mongols =

The Sichuan Mongols (Chinese: 四川蒙古族) are officially counted among the Mongolian nationality in China. However, they are a distinct ethno-linguistic group from all other Mongolic peoples speaking a form of the Naic language. They call themselves Mongols and possess their own clothing, history and language. All other peoples in the region recognize them as Mongols (Mengguzu).

The Sichuan Mongols' main religion is Tibetan Buddhism. A sizable temple remains in active use just behind the prince's house. Most temples and altars being destroyed during the Cultural Revolution but many of them were recovered afterwards. Most Sichuan Mongols are farmers or fishermen, leading quiet lives in their remote villages. They observe Buddhist festivals.

Historically, the Mongols in Yongning were ruled by three chiefs, elevated to power by Kublai Khan in the 13th century. Before Communist rule, the Mongol monarch acted as a warlord over the whole region. When the Communists took over, they deposed him, not killing him so as not to make him a martyr in the people's eyes. The Mongol palace was destroyed and the prince was sent to a reeducation camp for several years. The prince is still alive today but is not allowed to rule. Many older Mongols still bow their heads in respect when they pass him on the street.

== Settlements ==
- Wujiao Mongol Village, Mili Tibetan Autonomous County, Liangshan Yi Autonomous Prefecture
- Xiangjiao Mongol Village, Mili Tibetan Autonomous County, Liangshan Yi Autonomous Prefecture
- Dapo Mongol Village, Yanyuan County, Liangshan Yi Autonomous Prefecture

== See also ==
- Mongols in China
- Khatso
