= Inner Mongolia University =

Public university in Hohhot, Inner Mongolia, China

- 内蒙古大学 ᠥᠪᠥᠷ ᠮᠣᠩᠭᠣᠯ ‍ᠤᠨ ᠶᠡᠬᠡ ᠰᠤᠷᠭᠠᠭᠤᠯᠢ
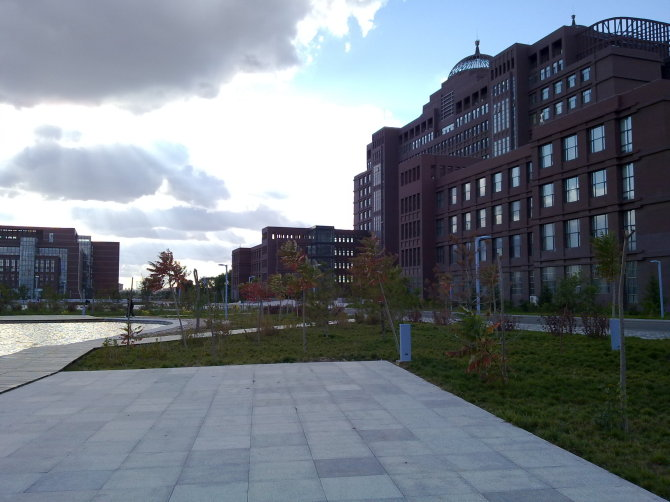
- Motto: 求真务实
- Type: Public university
- Established: 1957; 69 years ago
- President: Chen Guoqing
- Faculty: 1,303
- Administrative staff: 1,111
- Students: 23,203
- Undergraduates: 12,766
- Postgraduates: 3,191
- Doctoral students: 286
- Other students: 5,916
- Location: Hohhot, Inner Mongolia
- Campus: Urban
- Nickname: 内大
- Website: www.imu.edu.cn

Inner Mongolia University

Chinese name
- Simplified Chinese: 内蒙古大学
- Traditional Chinese: 內蒙古大學
Transcriptions
Standard Mandarin
- Hanyu Pinyin: Nèiměnggǔ Dàxué

Mongolian name
- Mongolian Cyrillic: Өвөр Монголын их сургууль
- Mongolian script: ᠥᠪᠥᠷ ᠮᠣᠩᠭᠣᠯ ‍ᠤᠨ ᠶᠡᠬᠡ ᠰᠤᠷᠭᠠᠭᠤᠯᠢ
Transcriptions
- SASM/GNC: Övör Mongolyn yeke surγaγuli

Inner Mongolia University (IMU) is a provincial public university in Hohhot, Inner Mongolia, China. It is affiliated with the People's Government of the Inner Mongolia Autonomous Region and co-funded with the Ministry of Education of China. The university is part of Project 211 and the Double First-Class Construction.

The university has four campuses, covering an area of 1,990 thousand square meters. It consists of 20 colleges, under which there are 34 departments, and 1 independent department for general education.

As of February 2006, the university provides 92 programs for master's degrees and 59 undergraduate majors. About 2,414 staff members work with the university, including 1,303 full-time teachers and researchers, among whom are 744 professors and associate professors. Inner Mongolia University has officially signed agreements of exchange and cooperation with 20 foreign universities.

== Campuses ==
There are currently three separate campuses, all located in city of Hohhot. The main campus is adjacent to Manduhai Park. To meet the need for rapid development of higher education in both Inner Mongolia and the whole China, the university is undergoing an expansion on a large scale. A new campus is being built in suburban Huhhot.

=== Toli/Taoli Lake ===
Rengong Hu, an artificial lake constructed when the university was first built has been maintained during spring, summer and autumn. In winter, water is frozen and a part of the surface is operated as a skating rink.

Rengong Hu was later renamed Sai Hu (in Mongolian, ᠰᠠᠢᠨsai means good). During the Fortieth Anniversary of the founding of the university in 1997, it was again renamed as Taoli Hu (in Chinese, 桃李 Taoli means intellectual; while in Mongolian, ᠲᠣᠯᠢ Toli means mirror). Its water surface is 13,000 square meters.

== Characteristics ==
At nearly all colleges, a few courses taught in both Chinese and Mongolian are provided. Bachelor, Master and Doctoral degrees in a few majors are awarded by studying in Mongolian – some courses in the Chinese language are always mandatory.

In recent years, the university has also made efforts to provide courses taught in English, Japanese and Russian. For example, the College of Law has officially listed during an important, cosmetic curriculum reform since the mid-2000s. Many other colleges have followed this practice.

== Admission ==
The university admits undergraduates from those applicants who take part in the national examination for admission to universities and colleges. In this examination, questions for all subjects are assigned by a particular group nominated by the country.

The university admits master's degree students from those applicants who take part in examination for admission to master's degree programs. In this examination, questions for some subjects are assigned by a particular group nominated by the country, while questions for some subjects are assigned by supervisors.

The university admits doctoral degree students from those applicants who take part in examination for admission to doctoral degree programs. In this examination, questions for some subjects are assigned by a particular group nominated by the country, while questions for some subjects are assigned by supervisors.

The university admits foreign degree and non-degree students through particular application procedure designed for foreigners. Instruction languages include Chinese, Mongolian, English, etc. It is also possible to study other languages at Inner Mongolia University, such as Russian and Japanese.

== Enrollment ==
Inner Mongolia University provides full-time education, vocational and technical education, adult education, and foreign students education. In 2005, there were 22,203 students, including 3,191 postgraduate students and 12,766 undergraduate students.

== History ==
It was established in 1957 in Hohhot, the capital city of Inner Mongolia Autonomous Region.

Being awarded the national key comprehensive university by the Ministry of Education of China in 1978, it was listed as one of 100 universities of the former "211 Project" universities for key construction and development in 1997.

It is included in the Double First-Class Construction designed by the central government of China.

== Organization ==
As most Chinese universities with strong Chinese characteristics, Inner Mongolia University includes a huge administrative system, besides its teaching and research system. There are even some enterprises operated under the umbrella of this university.

Teaching units at this university were originally called "department". At the end of the 1990s, almost all of them were renamed "schools" (in the sense similar to, e.g., law school), under which several departments were covered. However, currently on the university website, they are translated as "colleges" in English. It is yet unclear whether these colleges are still equivalent to schools, or are enlarged based on those schools.

- Administrative System: Party and Executive Affairs Office, Regulation Inspecting Committee (including Supervisory and Audit Office), Organization Department, Propaganda Department, Office Managing retired Staff, Personnel Department, Teaching Affairs Department, Research Affairs Department, Finance Department, Service Department, Public Security, Youth League committee(Students' Affairs Office), Staff Union.
- Teaching System: Academy of Mongolian studies, College of Humanities, College of Foreign Languages, College of Economics and Management, College of Law, College of Science and Technology, College of Chemistry and Chemical Engineering, College of Life Sciences, College of Computer Science and Technology, College for Continuing Education, College of International Education, Postgraduate College, College of Arts, College for Professional Training, College of Public Policy and Management, Department of Physical Teaching.
- Research System: Research of Mongolian Language, Research of Mongolian History, Research of Modern and Contemporary History, Research on Neighboring Countries, Research of Mongolian Culture, Center of Mongolology, Center of Economic and Social Development, Institute of High Polymer Science, Center for Laboratory Animal Science, Center of Biological Engineering, Research of Natural Resources.
- Affiliations: Inner Mongolia University Library, Inner Mongolia University Journal, Inner Mongolia University Press.
- Enterprises: Aodu Group cooperation, Xuri Biological High Tech Co. Ltd., Fangyuan Metallurgy & Chemistry Co. Ltd.

== Presidents ==
- Ulanhu, 1957–1966
- Wang Duo, 1978-1978
- Yu Beichen, 1978–1981
- Tubxin, 1981–1985
- Fang Tianqi, 1985–1990
- Sun Yuzhen, 1990–1993
- B.Shorgan, 1993–2006
- Lian Ji (b. October 1955-), October 2006-.
- Chen Guoqing

== Notable alumni and academics ==
=== Natural sciences ===
- Li Bo (15 April 1929 – 21 May 1998), phytoecologist. Died in traffic accident in Hungary.
- Li Jitong (24 August 1897 – 1961), ecologist and phytophysiologist.
- B. Shorgan (b. August 1940), reproductive biologist. Kidnapped on 20 December 2005 by four suspects and rescued after 13 hours.

=== Humanities and social sciences ===
- Ba Bulinbeihe (February 1928), poet.
- Chinggeltei (June 1924 – December 2013), Mongolian linguist.
- Choijinzhab (January 1931––April 2022), Mongolian linguist.
- Shi Wenzheng, jurist.

=== Politicians ===
- Bao Junchen (born January 1946), vice-president of People's Political Consultative Committee of Inner Mongolia Autonomous Region (16 January 2003-?).
- Chen Youzun (born September 1925), vice-president of People's Political Consultative Committee of Inner Mongolia Autonomous Region(?-?)
- Hu Zhong (born March 1944), secretary of Committee of Politics and Law of Inner Mongolia Autonomous Region (October 2001-?).
- Liu Zhilan (born August 1944), vice-president of People's Political Consultative Committee of Inner Mongolia Autonomous Region (16 January 2003-?).
- Xu Bonian (born January 1939), vice-president of People's Political Consultative Committee of Inner Mongolia Autonomous Region(16 January 2003-?).
- Yun Bulong (1937-12 June 2000), late president of Inner Mongolia Autonomous Region (January 1998-12 June 2000), died in crash between car and train.
- Yang Jing (born December 1953), former chairman of the Inner Mongolia Autonomous Region (April 2003-?)
- Zhao Shuanglian (born April 1957), vice-chairman of the Inner Mongolia Autonomous Region (January 2003-).

== Rankings ==
Inner Mongolia University (IMU) is consistently ranked the best in Inner Mongolia, China. Since 2015, it has been ranked among the top 200 nationwide by the Best Chinese Universities Ranking. As of 2023, the Best Chinese Universities Ranking, also known as the "Shanghai Ranking", placed the university 113th in China.

In 2026, the Academic Ranking of World Universities ranked Inner Mongolia University in the top 901-1000th in the world. Globally, Inner Mongolia University (IMU) was ranked # 954 by the University Rankings by Academic Performance 2026-2027.

== Student Life and Culture ==
=== Inner Mongolia University Cultural Festival ===
Since the mid-1980s, Inner Mongolia University Cultural Festival has been celebrated in May each year. During this festival, a series of activities are held.

== Athletics ==
Inner Mongolia University Track and Field Games are held in Spring each year.

== Inner Mongolia University Library ==
Inner Mongolia University Library was established on 14 October 1957. Inner Mongolia University Library is located in the north of the main campus, facing the artificial lake.

== Inner Mongolia University Press ==
Established in 1985, Inner Mongolia University Press publishes books in both Chinese and Mongolian. Annually, it publishes about 120 books. Inner Mongolia University Press has published 1315 books since it was established, among which 140 books were in Mongolian, and 60 books were in English, Japanese and Russian, etc.

== Journal of Inner Mongolia University ==
Pinyin: Neimenggu Daxue Xuebao. Journal of Inner Mongolia University has three versions: Mongolian version, Journal of Inner Mongolia University(Humanities and Social Sciences) in Chinese, Journal of Inner Mongolia University(Acta Scientiarum Naturalium Universitatis NeiMongol) in Chinese (ISSN 1000-1638. Domestic Unified Periodic Number: CN15-1052/N) In fact, they are three different journals. Under Chinese regulation on publishing activities, they are regarded as merely one journal.
