= Chinggeltei =

Chinese Mongol linguist (1924–2013)

Chinese name
- Traditional Chinese: 清格爾泰
- Simplified Chinese: 清格尔泰
Transcriptions
Standard Mandarin
- Hanyu Pinyin: Qīnggè'ěrtái

Mongolian name
- Mongolian: ᠴᠢᠩᠭᠡᠯᠲᠡᠢ

Chinggeltei (pronounced [t͡ɕʰiŋkɪ̆ɬtʰé]; 12 June 1924 – 27 December 2013) was a professor of linguistics at the Inner Mongolia University in Hohhot, Inner Mongolia, People's Republic of China, focusing on the Mongolic languages. He was one of the founders of the university, and served as its first vice-rector. He was also a former member of the Standing Committee of China's National People's Congress.

== Early life and education ==
Chinggeltei was born in Harqin Banner, Josotu, Inner Mongolia (now administratively part of Chifeng). He did his early studies at a Mongolian-medium school in Inner Mongolia, before going to Manchukuo. After completing his course there in 1939, he hoped to transfer to the Peking Mongolian and Tibetan School (北京蒙藏学校, in Beijing); however, they would not accept students from Manchukuo. Eventually, he ended up enrolling in a teacher training course at the Houhe Mongolian Academy (厚和蒙古学院; "Houhe" is an older Chinese name for Hohhot), which normally only accepted students from the western parts of Inner Mongolia; he scored well enough on the entrance exam to be placed into the second-year course, and graduated in late 1940. From there, he entered into a preparatory school for students planning to study in Japan, and in 1941, proceeded to Tokyo.

Upon arriving in Tokyo, Chinggeltei enrolled in a juku to study English and mathematics for the university entrance exams; he chose to aim at an engineering school, because he felt that his homeland particularly lacked people with such skills. He ended up first enrolling at the Tokyo Institute of Technology, but due to the long commute from his home and the intensification of World War II, transferred to Tohoku Imperial University in Sendai.

== Career ==
In 1945, Chinggeltei returned to Inner Mongolia; soon after, the surrender of Japan brought World War II to an end. He took up teaching duties at the Inner Mongolia Autonomous Academy (内蒙古自治学院) in Chifeng, compiling textbooks and in Mongolian as well as teaching both politics and language and literature courses. It was there that he first met Ulanhu, who was the school's principal. Ulanhu's speeches about various events of the day (such as the 3 April 1946 meeting in Chengde which provided for the unification of Inner Mongolia as a single governmental unit) left a deep impression on the teachers of the school and helped them to become more knowledgeable about politics. In May 1947, half of the Autonomous Academy's teaching staff were transferred to Qiqihar to establish the Inner Mongolia Military Administration University (内蒙古军政大学); Chinggeltei was responsible for setting up their Mongolian language and literature division.

In 1949, Chinggeltei was transferred to the Inner Mongolia Daily (内蒙古日报) as editor of the Mongolian-language section and head of internal education; during this time, he also travelled to Hulunbuir for a linguistic survey, and published his Grammar of the Mongol language (蒙文文法). In 1953, he began doing language work for the Central Propaganda Department of the Chinese Communist Party. He was tapped to be vice-rector of the newly founded Inner Mongolia University in 1957, again working under Ulanhu.

In 1985, Chinggeltei published his Study of the Lesser Khitan Script , a significant milestone in the study of the Khitan language and its writing system. He was presented with a Festschrift by his fellow Mongolists in 1996 to commemorate the 50th anniversary of his taking up teaching duties. In 2008, he received the first "Award for Outstanding Talent" (杰出人才奖) from the Inner Mongolia Communist Party Standing Committee, including prize money of RMB200,000. He used the money to establish the Chinggeltei Mongolian Language Foundation, which provides scholarships to students receiving high scores in Mongolian language on the National Higher Education Entrance Examination.

== Selected works ==
- 蒙文文法 (in Chinese (China)), 内蒙古日报社, 1949. The first modern scientific grammar of the Mongolian language published in China
  - Translated to English as Chinggaltai (1952), A grammar of the Mongol language, Hong Kong: The Evangelical Alliance Mission, OCLC 252252646
  - Reprinted as Chinggaltai (1963), A grammar of the Mongol language, New York: Ungar, OCLC 1920867
  - Translated to Cyrillic-orthography Mongolian as Монгол хэлний зүй: зургаадугаар дэвтэр, National University of Mongolia, 2007, OCLC 317393560
  - John C. Street gave the 1963 English version a scathing review, criticising its "linguistic inanities" and "clumsy obfuscations".
- 契丹小字研究 [Study of the Lesser Khitan Script] (in Chinese (China)), Chinese Social Sciences Press, 1985, OCLC 16717597
