= Chagan Lake (China) =

Lake in Songyuan, Jilin, China

- 查干湖 (Chinese)
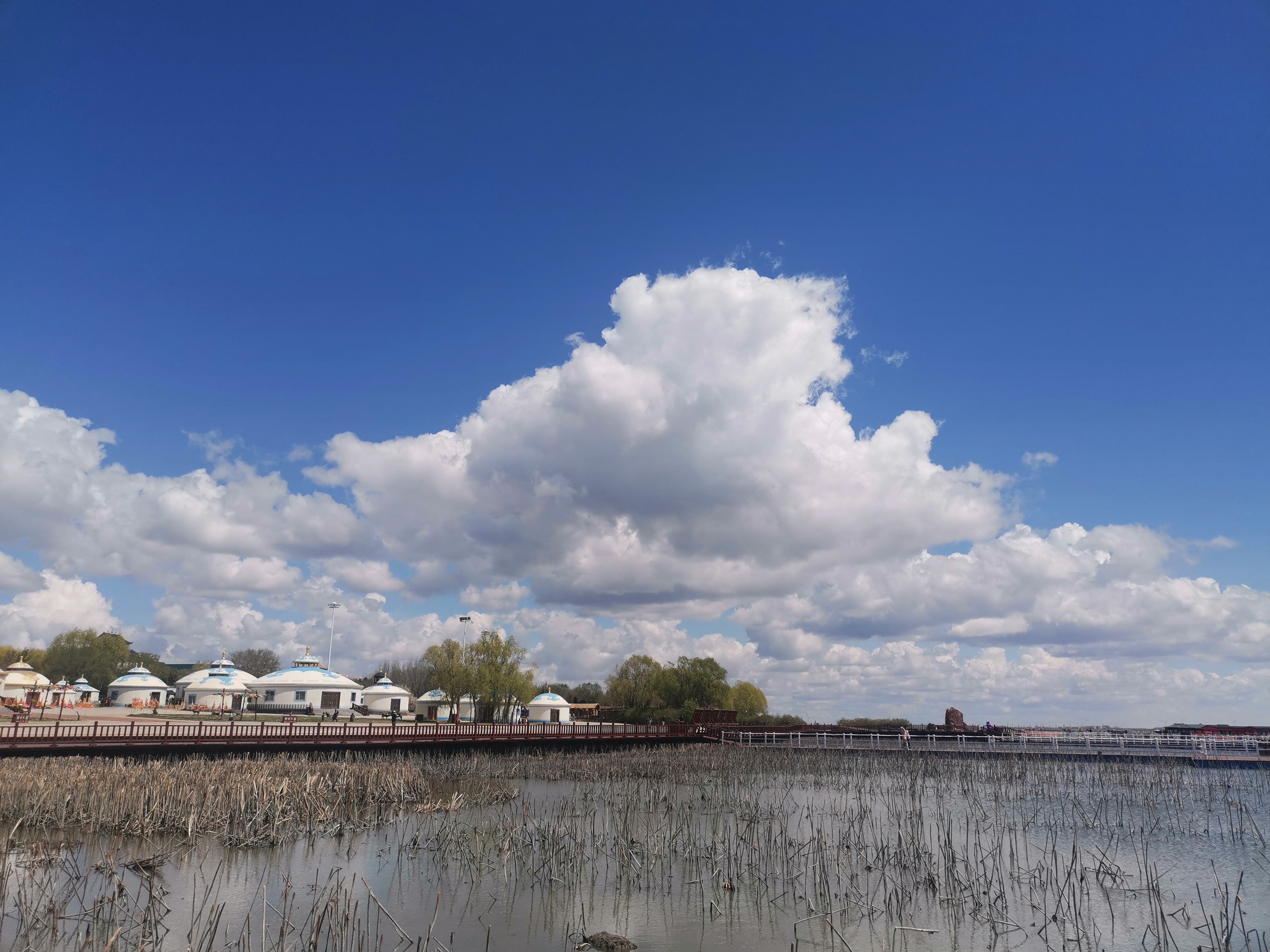
- Chagan Lake in Spring, 2025

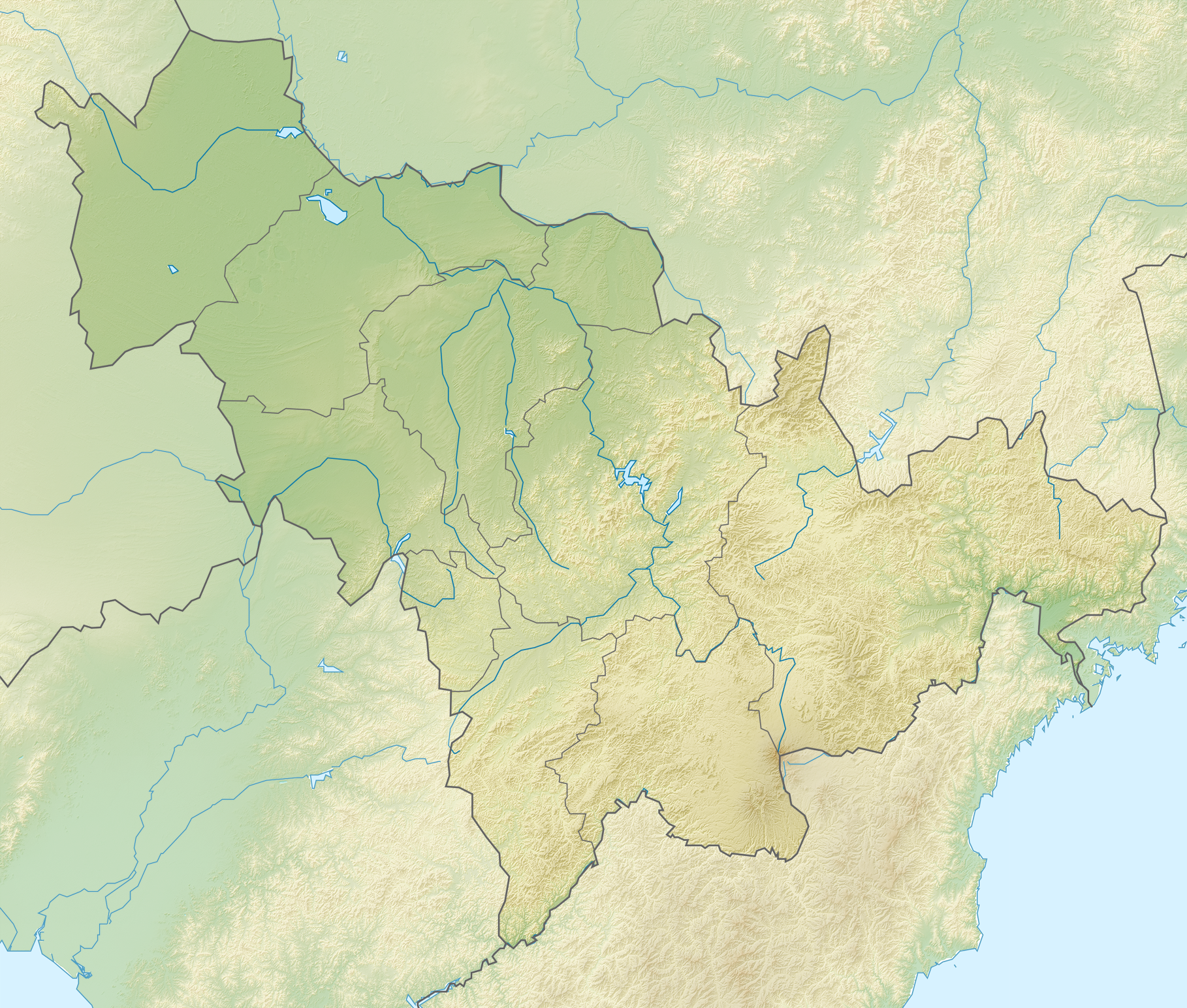
- Location within Jilin
- Location: Jilin, China
- Coordinates: 45.25°N 124.28°E
- Basin countries: China
- Surface area: 307 km^{2} (119 sq mi)
- Average depth: 4 m (13 ft)
- Water volume: 415×10^{6} m^{3} (14.7×10^{9} cu ft)

Chagan Lake (Chinese: 查干湖; pinyin: chágān hú) is a lake in Jilin, China. The name "Chagan" is from Mongolian (ᠴᠠᠭᠠᠨ
ᠨᠠᠭᠤᠷ, transliteration: Chaɣan naɣur, Cyrillic Mongolian: цагаан нуур, transliteration MNS: tsagaan nuur), meaning white / pure lake). It is often referred to as the Sacred Lake or Holy Water Lake (simplified Chinese: 圣水湖; traditional Chinese: 聖水湖; pinyin: shèngshuǐ hú) by local people. The lake is known for its traditional winter fishing, featuring a technique which dates back to prehistoric times.

== Chagan Naoer winter fishing tradition ==
Chagan Lake is the only place in which the oldest of Mongolian fishing methods is preserved. It is listed as a National Intangible Cultural Heritage of the People's Republic of China.

The annual Winter Fishing Festival is held to keep this ancient tradition alive. Fishermen first drill many holes through the thick ice and then use these holes to carefully position a 2 km net under the ice. The net and its catch is then hauled out of the largest hole by means of a capstan (see also Whim (mining)) turned by Mongolian horses. The Lake set a Guinness World Record of a single net that yielded 104,500 kg (230,400 lb) of fish in 2006, and broke its own record with 168,500 kg (371,500 lb) of fish in 2009. The principal species thus netted is the bighead carp - a popular food fish, particularly at the Chinese New Year, when the consumption of fish is considered to bring good fortune in the year to come.

== See also ==
- Chagan River, another toponym including the Mongolian adjective tsagaan
