= Khatso =

Mongolic ethnic group

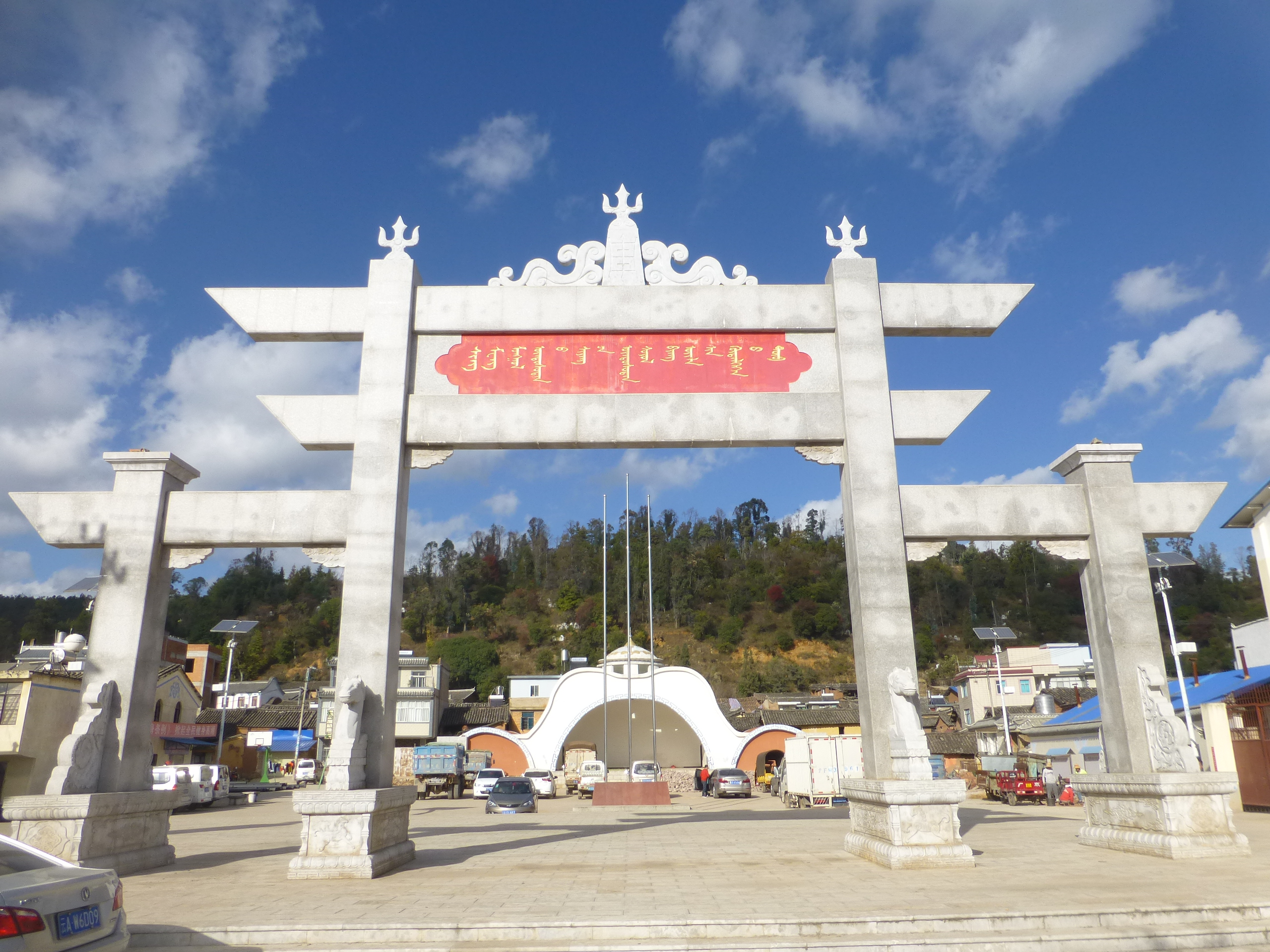
The main square of Xingmeng Mongol Ethnic Township in Tonghai County

The Khatso people (Chinese: 喀卓人), commonly known as the Yunnan Mongols (云南蒙古族), is a Mongolic ethnic group, mainly distributed in Tonghai County in the Yunnan province of southwestern China. The Khatso people are descendants of the army personnel of the Yuan dynasty.

== History ==
Before the mid-13th century, Yunnan was held by many war-like independent states such as the Nanchao and Dali Kingdoms. The Mongol Empire under Möngke Khan conquered the Dali Kingdom in 1253. Until 1273, a Chinggisid prince received viceroyalty over the area. Kublai Khan appointed the first governor, Turkmen Sayid Ajall, in Yunnan in 1273.

Yunnan and Hunan were the main bases for Mongol military operations in Indo-China. The Yuan gave the name Yunnan district with Kunming as the headquarters. After the expulsion of the Mongols from China in 1368, the Ming dynasty destroyed the Yuan loyalists in Yunnan under Basalawarmi in 1381 and occupied it. In 1381, "Ming Dynasty troops routed the Yuan army by the shore of the Baishui River. The Mongol soldiers, their hopes to return to their homeland having been dashed, had no alternative but to settle down in the province."

In the early 1980s, village elders sent a delegation to Inner Mongolia to re-learn their long lost Mongol culture. They adopted customs similar to Mongols in the north gradually, and wrestling became their favorite sport when they saw how popular it was with other Mongols.

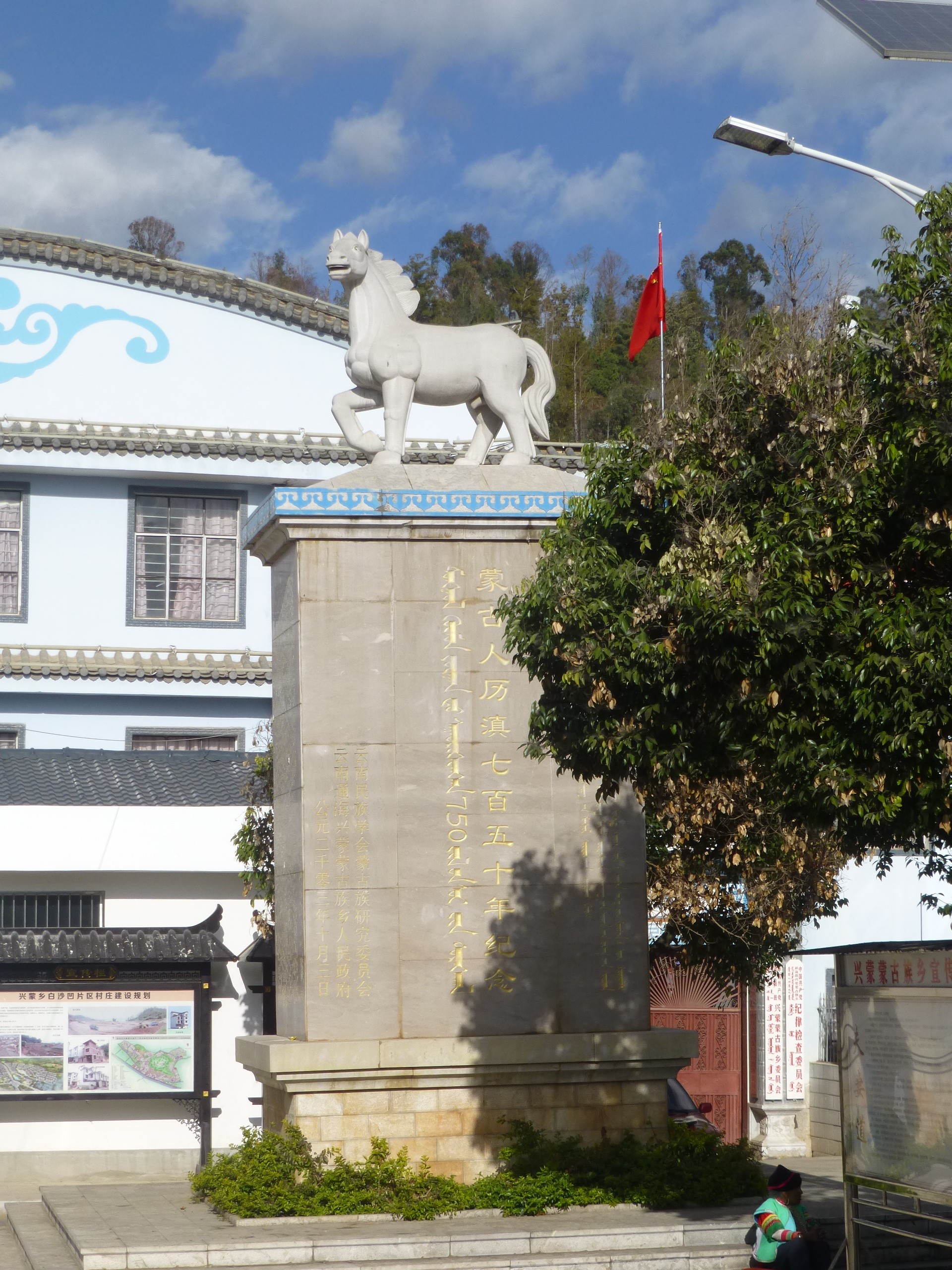
Monument in Xingmeng Township, commemorating 750 years of history of Mongol people in Yunnan

There are about 13,000 Khatso people, and their culture is heavily influenced by the local Yi culture.

== Language ==
Khatso people speak the Katso language, a Loloish language, to communicate with each other, and use Southwestern Mandarin with outsiders.

== See also ==
- Sichuan Mongols
