= Qian Gorlos Mongol Autonomous County =

Qian Gorlos County 前郭尔罗斯县 ᠡᠮᠦᠨᠡᠲᠦ ᠭᠣᠷᠯᠣᠰ ᠰᠢᠶᠠᠨ Front Gorlos, Qianguo
- Autonomous county
- ᠡᠮᠦᠨᠡᠲᠦ ᠭᠣᠷᠯᠣᠰ ᠤᠨ ᠮᠣᠩᠭᠣᠯ ᠦᠨᠳᠦᠰᠦᠲᠡᠨ ᠦ ᠥᠪᠡᠷᠲᠡᠭᠡᠨ ᠵᠠᠰᠠᠬᠤ ᠰᠢᠶᠠᠨ 前郭尔罗斯蒙古族自治县; Qian Gorlos Mongolian Autonomous County
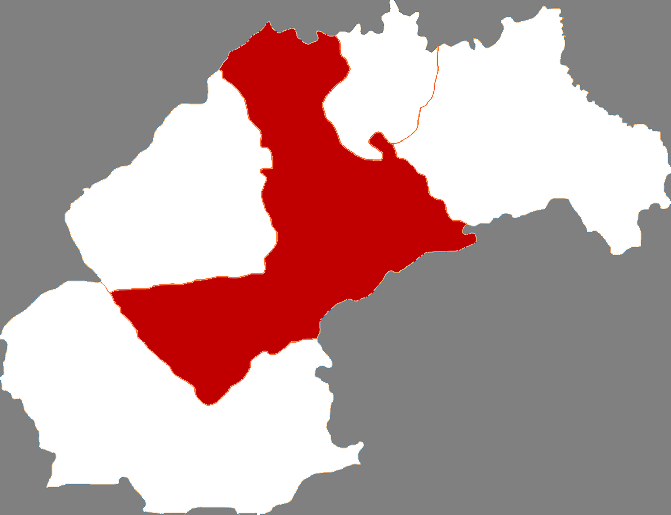
- Qian Gorlos in Songyuan

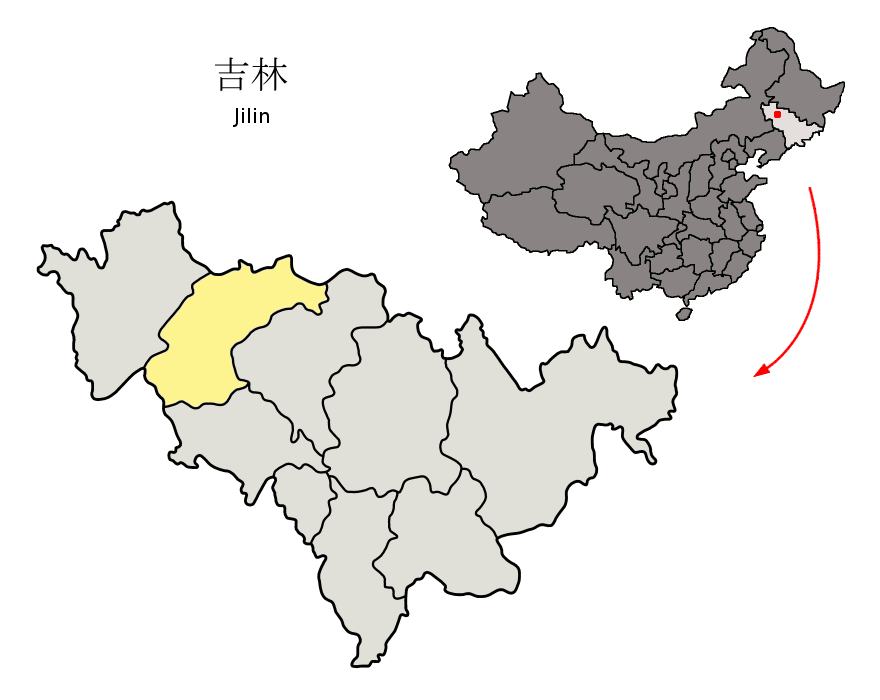
- Songyuan in Jilin
- Coordinates: 45°06′50″N 124°51′04″E
- Country: China
- Province: Jilin
- Prefecture-level city: Songyuan
- County seat: Amur Subdistrict

Area
  - Total: 5,117 km^{2} (1,976 sq mi)
- Elevation: 133 m (436 ft)

Population (2020 census)
  - Total: 407,385
  - Density: 79.61/km^{2} (206.2/sq mi)
- Time zone: UTC+8 (China Standard)
- Postal code: 131100
- Area code: 0438
- Website: www.qianguo.gov.cn

Qian Gorlos Mongol Autonomous County

Chinese name
- Simplified Chinese: 前郭尔罗斯蒙古族自治县
- Traditional Chinese: 前郭爾羅斯蒙古族自治縣
Transcriptions
Standard Mandarin
- Hanyu Pinyin: Qián Guō'ěrluósī Měnggǔzú Zìzhìxiàn

Qianguo County
- Simplified Chinese: 前郭县
- Traditional Chinese: 前郭縣
Transcriptions
Standard Mandarin
- Hanyu Pinyin: Qiánguō Xiàn

Mongolian name
- Mongolian Cyrillic: Өмнөд Горлосын Монгол үндэстний өөртөө засах шянь
- Mongolian script: ᠡᠮᠦᠨᠡᠲᠦ ᠭᠣᠷᠯᠣᠰ ᠤᠨ ᠮᠣᠩᠭᠣᠯ ᠦᠨᠳᠦᠰᠦᠲᠡᠨ ᠦ ᠥᠪᠡᠷᠲᠡᠭᠡᠨ ᠵᠠᠰᠠᠬᠤ ᠰᠢᠶᠠᠨ
Transcriptions
- SASM/GNC: emünetü ɣorlos-un moŋɣol ündüsüten-ü öbertegen ǰasaꭓu siyan

Qian Gorlos Mongolian Autonomous County (Chinese: 前郭尔罗斯蒙古族自治县), or simply Qian Gorlos County, commonly abbreviated as Qianguo County, is a county of northwestern Jilin province, China. It is under the administration of Songyuan City. Gorlos Mongols live here. Formerly known as Gorlos Front Banner (郭尔罗斯前旗).

== Geography and climate ==
Qian Gorlos has a monsoon-influenced humid continental climate (Köppen Dwa), with long, bitterly cold and very dry winters and hot, humid summers. The monthly 24-hour average temperature ranges from −15.9 °C (3.4 °F) in January to 23.7 °C (74.7 °F) in July, and the annual mean is 5.78 °C (42.4 °F). Over two-thirds of the annual precipitation occurs from June to August, with barely any in the winter months. With monthly percent possible sunshine ranging from 52% in July to 68% in February and March, the area receives 2,732 hours of bright sunshine annually.

Climate data for Qian Gorlos County, elevation 136 m (446 ft), (1991–2020 normals, extremes 1951–present)
| Month | Jan | Feb | Mar | Apr | May | Jun | Jul | Aug | Sep | Oct | Nov | Dec | Year |
|---|---|---|---|---|---|---|---|---|---|---|---|---|---|
| Record high °C (°F) | 3.9 (39.0) | 14.4 (57.9) | 24.2 (75.6) | 31.5 (88.7) | 36.2 (97.2) | 37.8 (100.0) | 38.2 (100.8) | 36.0 (96.8) | 32.5 (90.5) | 28.0 (82.4) | 18.0 (64.4) | 9.9 (49.8) | 38.2 (100.8) |
| Mean daily maximum °C (°F) | −9.9 (14.2) | −4.1 (24.6) | 4.6 (40.3) | 14.9 (58.8) | 22.3 (72.1) | 27.2 (81.0) | 28.8 (83.8) | 27.5 (81.5) | 22.6 (72.7) | 13.5 (56.3) | 1.3 (34.3) | −8.1 (17.4) | 11.7 (53.1) |
| Daily mean °C (°F) | −15.8 (3.6) | −10.5 (13.1) | −1.4 (29.5) | 8.7 (47.7) | 16.3 (61.3) | 21.9 (71.4) | 24.2 (75.6) | 22.5 (72.5) | 16.4 (61.5) | 7.5 (45.5) | −3.9 (25.0) | −13.4 (7.9) | 6.0 (42.9) |
| Mean daily minimum °C (°F) | −20.7 (−5.3) | −16.1 (3.0) | −7.0 (19.4) | 2.5 (36.5) | 10.5 (50.9) | 16.8 (62.2) | 19.9 (67.8) | 18.1 (64.6) | 10.8 (51.4) | 2.3 (36.1) | −8.2 (17.2) | −17.8 (0.0) | 0.9 (33.7) |
| Record low °C (°F) | −38.7 (−37.7) | −39.8 (−39.6) | −28.8 (−19.8) | −15.6 (3.9) | −3.8 (25.2) | 4.7 (40.5) | 10.9 (51.6) | 7.7 (45.9) | −1.2 (29.8) | −15.0 (5.0) | −26.2 (−15.2) | −36.0 (−32.8) | −39.8 (−39.6) |
| Average precipitation mm (inches) | 2.5 (0.10) | 2.8 (0.11) | 8.1 (0.32) | 13.3 (0.52) | 47.1 (1.85) | 81.2 (3.20) | 111.5 (4.39) | 93.8 (3.69) | 46.8 (1.84) | 19.7 (0.78) | 9.5 (0.37) | 5.1 (0.20) | 441.4 (17.37) |
| Average precipitation days (≥ 0.1 mm) | 3.4 | 2.5 | 4.0 | 4.7 | 9.6 | 11.8 | 12.8 | 10.8 | 8.1 | 5.7 | 4.1 | 5.1 | 82.6 |
| Average snowy days | 5.6 | 4.3 | 5.3 | 1.6 | 0 | 0 | 0 | 0 | 0 | 1.4 | 5.3 | 7.3 | 30.8 |
| Average relative humidity (%) | 63 | 55 | 48 | 44 | 51 | 62 | 74 | 75 | 66 | 59 | 61 | 66 | 60 |
| Mean monthly sunshine hours | 181.1 | 203.8 | 243.9 | 248.7 | 265.3 | 254.7 | 247.7 | 243.3 | 248.5 | 213.8 | 170.6 | 156.6 | 2,678 |
| Percentage possible sunshine | 63 | 69 | 66 | 61 | 57 | 55 | 53 | 57 | 67 | 64 | 60 | 58 | 61 |
Source: China Meteorological Administrationextremes

== Administrative divisions ==
The county administers 3 subdistricts, 9 towns and 13 townships.

| Name | Simplified Chinese | Hanyu Pinyin | Mongolian (Hudum Script) | Mongolian (Cyrillic) | Administrative division code |
|---|---|---|---|---|---|
Subdistricts
| Amur Subdistrict (Amu'er) | 阿穆尔街道 | Āmù'ěr Jiēdào | ᠠᠮᠤᠷ ᠵᠡᠭᠡᠯᠢ ᠭᠤᠳᠤᠮᠵᠢ | Амар зээл гудамж | 220721001 |
| Sarlang Subdistrict (Sarilang) | 萨日朗街道 | Sàrìlǎng Jiēdào | ᠰᠠᠷᠠᠯᠠᠩ ᠵᠡᠭᠡᠯᠢ ᠭᠤᠳᠤᠮᠵᠢ | Сараалан зээл гудамж | 220721002 |
| Hada Subdistrict | 哈达街道 | Hǎdá Jiēdào | ᠬᠠᠳᠠ ᠵᠡᠭᠡᠯᠢ ᠭᠤᠳᠤᠮᠵᠢ | Хад зээл гудамж | 220721003 |
Towns
| Qian Gorlos Town (Omnot Gorlos, Front Gorlos) | 前郭尔罗斯镇 | Qián Guō'ěrluósī Zhèn | ᠡᠮᠦᠨᠡᠲᠦ ᠭᠣᠷᠯᠣᠰ ᠪᠠᠯᠭᠠᠰᠤ | Өмнөд Горлос балгас | 220721100 |
| Changshan Town | 长山镇 | Chángshān Zhèn | ᠴᠠᠩᠱᠠᠨ ᠪᠠᠯᠭᠠᠰᠤ | Цан Шань балгас | 220721101 |
| Qaiborig Town (Habirag) | 海渤日戈镇 | Hǎibórìgē Zhèn | ᠬᠠᠪᠢᠷᠭ᠎ᠠ ᠪᠠᠯᠭᠠᠰᠤ | Хавирга балгас | 220721102 |
| Ulantuga Town (Ulan Tug) | 乌兰图嘎镇 | Wūlántúgā Zhèn | ᠤᠯᠠᠭᠠᠨᠲ᠋ᠤᠭ ᠪᠠᠯᠭᠠᠰᠤ | Улаантуг балгас | 220721103 |
| Qagan Hua Town (Chaganhua) | 查干花镇 | Chágānhuā Zhèn | ᠴᠠᠭᠠᠨᠬᠤᠸᠠ ᠪᠠᠯᠭᠠᠰᠤ | Чагаан хуа балгас | 220721104 |
| Wangfuzhan Town (Wanggiin Horoo Ortoo) | 王府站镇 | Wángfǔzhàn Zhèn | ᠸᠠᠩ ᠤᠨ ᠬᠣᠷᠢᠶ᠎ᠠ ᠥᠷᠲᠡᠭᠡ ᠪᠠᠯᠭᠠᠰᠤ | Вангийн хороо өртөө балгас | 220721105 |
| Balang Town | 八郎镇 | Bāláng Zhèn | ᠪᠠ ᠯᠠᠩ ᠪᠠᠯᠭᠠᠰᠤ | Ба Лан балгас | 220721106 |
| Har Mod Town | 哈拉毛都镇 | Hālāmáodū Zhèn | ᠬᠠᠷᠠᠮᠣᠳᠣ ᠪᠠᠯᠭᠠᠰᠤ | Хармод балгас | 220721107 |
| Qagan Nur Town | 查干湖镇 | Chágànhú Zhèn | ᠴᠠᠭᠠᠨ ᠨᠠᠭᠤᠷ ᠪᠠᠯᠭᠠᠰᠤ | Чагаан Нуур балгас | 220721108 |
Townships
| Baodian Township | 宝甸乡 | Bǎodiàn Xiāng | ᠪᠣᠣ ᠳ᠋ᠢᠶᠠᠨ ᠰᠢᠶᠠᠩ | Бао Дянь шиян | 220721200 |
| Pingfeng Township | 平凤乡 | Píngfèng Xiāng | ᠫᠢᠩ ᠹᠠᠩ ᠰᠢᠶᠠᠩ | Пин фан шиян | 220721201 |
| Dalba Township | 达里巴乡 | Dálǐbā Xiāng | ᠳ᠋ᠠᠷᠪᠠ ᠰᠢᠶᠠᠩ | Дарва шиян | 220721203 |
| Jalat Township | 吉拉吐乡 | Jílātǔ Xiāng | ᠵᠠᠯᠠᠭᠠᠲᠤ ᠰᠢᠶᠠᠩ | Залаат шиян | 220721204 |
| Bailag Township | 白依拉嘎乡 | Báiyīlāgā Xiāng | ᠪᠠᠶᠠᠯᠠᠭ ᠰᠢᠶᠠᠩ | Биелэг шиян | 220721205 |
| Hongquan Township | 洪泉乡 | Hóngquán Xiāng | ᠬᠤᠩ ᠴᠢᠦᠸᠠᠨ ᠰᠢᠶᠠᠩ | Хунчуань шиян | 220721206 |
| Eru Township | 额如乡 | Érú Xiāng | ᠡᠷᠡᠦ ᠰᠢᠶᠠᠩ | Эрүү шиян | 220721207 |
| Tohoitai Township | 套浩太乡 | Tàohàotài Xiāng | ᠲᠣᠬᠣᠢᠲᠠᠢ ᠰᠢᠶᠠᠩ | Тохойтой шиян | 220721208 |
| Changlong Township | 长龙乡 | Chánglóng Xiāng | ᠴᠠᠩ ᠯᠦᠩ ᠰᠢᠶᠠᠩ | Цан лүн шиян | 220721209 |
| Ulan Tal Township (Ulantala) | 乌兰塔拉乡 | Wūlántǎlā Xiāng | ᠤᠯᠠᠭᠠᠨᠲᠠᠯ᠎ᠠ ᠰᠢᠶᠠᠩ | Улаан тал шиян | 220721210 |
| Dongsanjiazi Township | 东三家子乡 | Dōngsānjiāzi Xiāng | ᠵᠡᠭᠦᠨ ᠭᠤᠷᠪᠠᠨᠭᠡᠷ ᠰᠢᠶᠠᠩ | Зүүн Гурвангэр шиян | 220721211 |
| Hot Mangh Township (Hotmangha) | 浩特芒哈乡 | Hàotèmánghǎ Xiāng | ᠬᠣᠲᠠᠮᠠᠩᠬ᠎ᠠ ᠰᠢᠶᠠᠩ | Хотманх шиян | 220721212 |
| Ulan Od Township (Ulan'odur) | 乌兰敖都乡 | Wūlán'áodū Xiāng | ᠤᠯᠠᠭᠠᠨ ᠣᠳᠣ ᠰᠢᠶᠠᠩ | Улаан Од шиян | 220721213 |

== Transport ==
- G12 Hunchun–Ulanhot Expressway
- G45 Daqing–Guangzhou Expressway
- China National Highway 203
- China National Highway 302
