= G2511 Xinmin–Lubei Expressway =

Road in China

Xinmin–Lubei Expressway
- 新民－鲁北高速公路
- Xinlu Expressway 新鲁高速公路
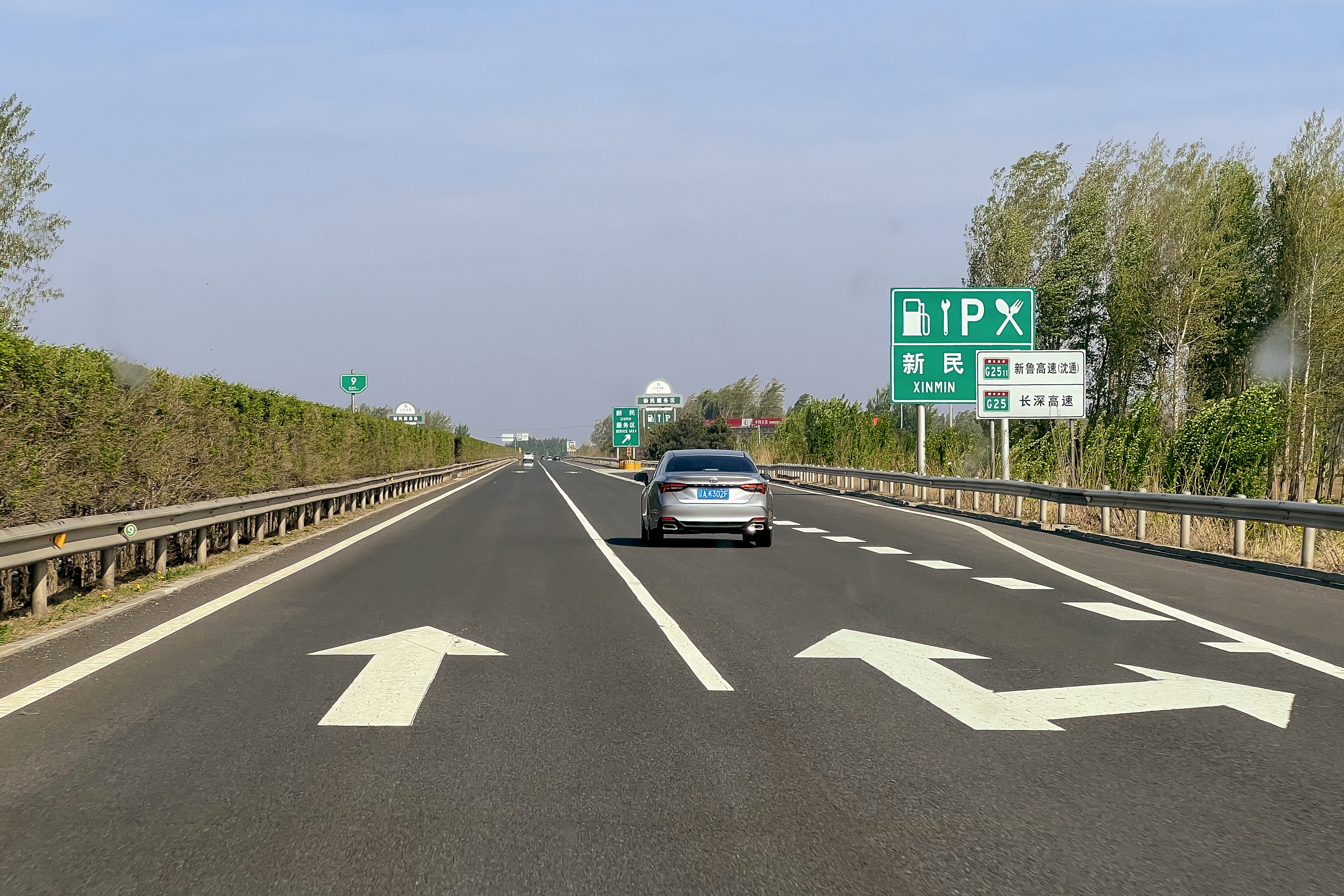

Route information
- Auxiliary route of G25

Major junctions
- Southeast end: G1113 / G91 in Xinmin, Shenyang, Liaoning
- Northwest end: Lubei, Jarud Banner, Tongliao, Inner Mongolia (when complete); G304 in Zhangwu County, Fuxin, Liaoning (current)

Location
- Country: China

Highway system
- National Trunk Highway System; Primary; Auxiliary; National Highways; Transport in China
← G2504	→ G2512

The G2511 Xinmin–Lubei Expressway (Chinese: 新民—鲁北高速公路), commonly referred to as the Xinlu Expressway (Chinese: 新鲁高速公路), is an expressway in China that connects the cities of Xinmin, Liaoning, and Lubei, Jarud Banner, Tongliao, Inner Mongolia. The expressway is a spur of G25 Changchun–Shenzhen Expressway.

The expressway connects the following cities:

- Xinmin, Liaoning
- Zhangwu County, Fuxin, Liaoning
- Horqin District, Tongliao, Inner Mongolia
- Lubei, Jarud Banner, Tongliao, Inner Mongolia

Currently only the section from Xinmin to Zhangwu County is complete.
