= Gongzhutun Campaign =

1948 battles of the Chinese Civil War

- Part of the Chinese Civil War
Date	January 2, 1948 – January 7, 1948
Location	Shantung, China
Result	Communist victory

Belligerents
Republic of China Army	People's Liberation Army

Commanders and leaders
Chen Cheng	Lin Biao; Luo Ronghuan

Strength
100,000	120,000

Casualties and losses
20,000 killed	10,000 killed

Gongzhutun Campaign was a series of battles fought in the regions of Gongzhutun ( Princess Village) in Northeast China between the nationalists and the communists during the Chinese Civil War in the post-World War II era and resulted in communist victory. The campaign was part of the Winter Offensive of 1947 in Northeast China.

After witnessing the separate enemy offensives at regions including Northern Ticket (Beipiao, 北票), Black Mountain (Heshan, 黑山), Greater Tiger Mountain, (大虎山), Tai'an (台安) in late December, 1947, and learning that the communist 1st column and the 2nd column remained at Zhangwu in the second stage of the Winter Offensive of 1947 in Northeast China, Chen Cheng believed that the communist force was no longer concentrated together and thus he had an opportunity to launch a counterattack. The five nationalist armies deployed at Shenyang, Xinmin and Tieling were ordered to attack westward from Shenyang, hoping to relieve Faku (法库) by destroying the communist 1st column, 6th column, and the 10th column. The nationalist push begun on January 1, 1948, in three fronts:

- The Newly Organized 3rd Army and the Newly Organized 6th Army in the north
- The Newly Organized 1st Army and the 71st Army in the middle
- The Newly Organized 5th Army along with the 43rd division and the 195th division in the south.

Learning the news of the nationalists sending out reinforcement, and the 195th Division of the nationalist Newly Organized 5th Army was moving toward the Princess Village (Gongzhutun, 公主屯) region on January 2, 1948, the communists planned to concentrate a total of seven columns to destroy the weakest nationalist southern front:

- The communist 1st column, 4th column, and 10th column were deployed to the north and northwest of Shenyang to prevent other nationalist fronts from reinforcing the southern front
- The communist 6th column engaged the nationalist troops in the southern front and lured the enemy to Princess Village (Gongzhutun, 公主屯) region.
- The communist 2nd column, 3rd column and the 7th column penetrated deep behind the nationalist line, surrounding the enemy.

Not willing to risk losing any territory, Chen Cheng divided his force into half: have of the force would relieve the besieged southern front, while the remaining half would continue the push to Faku (法库). The communist resistance was much greater than nationalists had expected, resulting in neither half had the enough strength needed to complete their missions. On January 2, 1948, the nationalist Newly Organized 5th Army was stopped at the Princess Village (Gongzhutun, 公主屯) by the communist 6th Column, and on the same day, communist 2nd Column, 3rd Column and 7th Column had also reached and encircled the nationalist army in at the Princess Village and surrounding regions including Yellow Family's Ridge, (Huangjialing, 黄家岭), Xin Family's Hotel, (Xinjiadian, 辛家店), Anfu Village (Anfutun, 安福屯), and Chuanxin Hotel (Chuanxindian, 川心店).

In the afternoon on January 5, 1948, the communist trap was completed and a full-scale assault on the besieged enemy was launched. The communist 3rd Column attacked from east and south, the communist 7th Column attacked from west and southwest, the communist 6th Column and 2nd Column attacked from north and northwest. After fierce battle, most of nationalist positions outside the Princess Village (Gongzhutun, 公主屯) had lost, and by dawn of January 6, 1948, the survivors only held a 10 square kilometer region centered at Princess Village (Gongzhutun, 公主屯). On January 5, 1948, the nationalist forces on the other two fronts attempted to reinforce their comrades-in-arms by their advances were checked by the communist 10th Column and 1st Column respectively at Liao River 20 km away.

In the morning of January 6, 1948, the relentless assaults on the surviving nationalists at Princess Village (Gongzhutun, 公主屯) resumed under intense artillery shelling. The 7th Division of the communist 3rd Column concentrated over 50 artilleries to bombard Anfu Village (Anfutun, 安福屯), and annihilated the nationalist defenders from the 195th Division of the Newly Organized 5th Army. Immediately afterward, the communist 2nd Column and 7th Column besieged the 585th Regiment of the 195th Division of the nationalist Newly Organized 5th Army at Taoist Priest Wang's Village (Wangjiatun, 王道士屯), and after numerous futile attempts to counterattack, the nationalist 585 Regiment was forced to surrender. The 584th Regiment and other units of the 195th Division of the nationalist Newly Organized 5th Army lost the willing to continue to wait for the reinforcement and attempted to break northeastward to the region of Rear Wen Family's Platform (Houwenjiatai, 后文家台), but they were completely annihilated in the knee-deep snow by the communist 2nd Column and 6th Column when they were bogged down.

In the morning of January 7, 1948, the 5th Division of the communist 2nd Column and the 9th Division of the communist 3rd Column jointly launched the assault on the army headquarter of the nationalist Newly Reorganized 5th Army, and the divisional headquarter of the 43rd Division of the nationalist Newly Reorganized 5th Army, and another nationalist regiment at the region of Frontal Wen Family's Platform (Qianwenjiatai, 前文家台). Under the cover of intense artillery bombardment, the battle was over within an hour and the nationalist survivors were completely annihilated. In the evening of January 7, 1948, the communist 6th Column and two divisions of the communist 2nd Column jointly launched the assault on the two regiments of the 43rd Division of the nationalist Newly Reorganized 5th Army at the Yellow Family's Ridge, (Huangjialing, 黄家岭), and the nationalist southern front was completely devastated, with the commander of the Newly Organized 5th Army and the commanders the 43rd division and the 195th division captured alive by the communists. Learning the news of the defeat of the southern front, the nationalist reinforcements to Faku (法库) and the southern front both withdrew back to Shenyang and Tieling, after suffering over 4,000 fatalities in their futile attempt to relief their besieged comrades-in-arms.

During this campaign, the communists had succeeded in totally annihilating the nationalist Newly Organized 5th Army numbering more than 20,000, capturing the army commander and the nationalist divisional commanders of both the 195th Division and the 43rd Division. The communists also captured 261 artillery pieces, 6,880 guns, 137 motor vehicles, and 1,409 horses and mules. Gongzhutun Campaign was a decisive campaign in the Winter Offensive of 1947 in Northeast China in that it helped to determine the outcome of the offensive.

== See also ==
- Outline of the Chinese Civil War
- National Revolutionary Army
- History of the People's Liberation Army
