= Winter Offensive of 1947 in Northeast China =

Part of the Chinese Civil War

- Part of the Chinese Civil War
Date	December 15, 1947 – March 15, 1948
Location	Northeast China
Result	Communist victory

Belligerents
Flag of the National Revolutionary Army National Revolutionary Army	PLA People's Liberation Army

Commanders and leaders
Chen Cheng; Wei Lihuang	(China) Lin Biao (China) Luo Ronghuan

Strength
580,000	730,000

Casualties and losses
156,000	Unknown

The Winter Offensive of 1947 in Northeast China (simplified Chinese: 东北1947年冬季攻势; traditional Chinese: 東北1947年冬季攻勢; pinyin: Dōngběi yījiǔsìqī nián dōngjì gōngshì) was a series of battles initiated by the Communist forces against the Kuomintang (Nationalists) during the Chinese Civil War after World War II.

== Prelude ==
After the Summer Offensive of 1947 in Northeast China and the Autumn Offensive of 1947 in Northeast China, the nationalists were forced to withdraw to 28 cities in northeast China, including Siping (city) – Dashiqiao, Jilin City, Changchun, and other cities along the Shanhai Pass – Shenyang railroad. The Nationalist force totaled 13 armies and with additional independent divisions, the total strength was 44 divisions with troops numbering more than 580,000. In contrast, the Communists had a total of 730,000 troops, including more than 340,000 regular troops in 40 divisions belonging to 9 columns of the field army, and an additional 390,000 belong to local garrison and militia units.

== Nationalist Strategy ==
The Nationalist force was originally commanded by Chen Cheng, and the decision was made to ensure the security of the Liaoxi Corridor (遼西走廊) and the current cities under the Nationalist control, and when the situation permitted, restore the communication line between Changchun and Shenyang. To achieve this objective, the nationalists deployed at least 3 – 5 divisions at each city of Siping (city), Jilin City, Changchun, while 1 – 2 divisions were deployed at each of the strategic locations along the Jinzhou – Shenyang railroad. In the meantime, the Newly Organized 1st Army (新編第1軍) and the Newly Organized 6th Army (新編第6軍) were deployed as mobile strike force in regions between Shenyang and Tieling.

== Communist Strategy ==
The objective of the Communist force under the command of Lin Biao and Luo Ronghuan was to deploy its force more rapidly by taking advantage of the winter when the river surfaces had frozen, and destroy another 7 – 8 Nationalist divisions by concentrating its troops belonging to the field army, with the help of units of local garrison. The Communists hoped to eliminate Nationalist force in southern Liaoning. In order to achieve this objective, the 8th column and the 9th column of the field army were ordered to strike eastward from Chaoyang, while other columns were ordered to the north and west of Shenyang.

== Order of Battle ==
Nationalist order of battle: major units engaged in the campaign included:

- The Newly Organized 1st Army deployed at Shenyang
- The Newly Organized 3rd Army deployed at Shenyang
- The Newly Organized 5th Army deployed at Shenyang
- The Newly Organized 6th Army deployed at Tieling
- The 49th Army deployed at Zhangwu
- The 52nd Army deployed at Yingkou
- The 60th Army deployed at Panshan
- The 71st Army deployed at Xinmin
- The 25th division deployed at Anshan
- The 43rd division deployed at Jinzhou
- The 50th division deployed at Changchun
- The 53rd division deployed at Changchun
- The 54th division deployed at Jinzhou
- The Reorganized 54th division deployed at Liaoyang
- The 87th division deployed at Siping (city)
- The 91st division deployed at Siping (city),
- The 195th division deployed in South Liaoning
- The 207th division deployed to the northwest of Shenyang

Communist order of battle:

- Entire field army:
  - The 1st Column
  - The 2nd Column
  - The 3rd Column
  - The 4th Column
  - The 6th Column
  - The 7th Column
  - The 8th Column
  - The 9th Column
  - The 10th Column

== First stage ==
The offensive started on December 15, 1947, when Communist 2nd column suddenly surrounded Faku, while at the same time, the communist 4th column approached Shenyang. In the meantime, the communist 1st column, 3rd column, 6th column, and 7th column penetrated into the regions surrounding Tieling, Xinmin, Shenyang and Faku, while the 10th column approached Kaiyuan.

On December 18, 1947, the 22nd division of the Nationalist Newly Organized 6th Army was sent out from Tieling to reinforce Faku, but was ambushed by the Communist 2nd and 7th columns on the way, losing an entire regiment, after which the Nationalist reinforcement retreated to Tieling. Another regiment of the Nationalist 59th division was also lost to the same Communist units to the south of Faku, and as a result, the nationalists temporarily suspended all rescue attempts to relieve Faku. To counter the Communist threat to Shenyang, Chen Cheng strengthened defense of Tieling, Xinmin, Shenyang regions by redeploying the 50th division and the 53rd division from Changchun, the 81st division and the 91st division from Siping (city), the 195th division from southern Liaoning, the 43rd division and 54th division from Jinzhou. Chen Cheng's redeployment of his troops left many areas vulnerable, and taking this advantage, the Communist 2nd column and the 7th column took Zhangwu after annihilating the 79th division of the 49th Army of the Nationalist defenders of city on December 28, 1947. The next day, the Nationalist 207th division deployed to the northwest of Shenyang was badly mauled by the Communist 6th column. Fearing the Nationalist formations would be decimated once left their strongholds, Chen Cheng ordered his troops to assume defensive positions behind city walls instead of going out to engage the enemy.

In order to lure the nationalists out of their strongholds, the Communist 1st column penetrated into central Liaoning region, while the 4th column penetrated into the regions between Shenyang and Liaoyang, and the 8th column along with the 9th column attacked the isolated Nationalist outposts. Smaller cities like Beipiao, Heishan, Tai'an and Dahushan fell into communist hands.

== Second stage ==
After witnessed the separate enemy offensives and learning that the Communist 1st column and the 2nd column remained at Zhangwu, Chen Cheng believed that the communist force was no longer concentrated together and thus he had an opportunity to launch a counterattack. The five Nationalist armies deployed at Shenyang, Xinmin and Tieling were ordered to attack westward from Shenyang, hoping to relieve Faku by destroying the Communist 1st column, 6th column, and the 10th column. The Nationalist push begun on January 1, 1948, in three fronts:

- The Newly Organized 3rd Army and the Newly Organized 6th Army in the north
- The Newly Organized 1st Army and The 71st Army in the middle
- The Newly Organized 5th Army along with the 43rd division and the 195th division in the south.

Learning the news of the nationalists sending out reinforcement, the Communists planned to concentrate a total of 7 columns to destroy the weakest Nationalist southern front:

- The Communist 1st column, 4th column, and 10th column were deployed to the north and northwest of Shenyang to prevent other Nationalist fronts from reinforcing the southern front
- The Communist 6th column engaged the Nationalist troops in the southern front and lured the enemy to around the town of Gongzhutun.
- The Communist 2nd column, 3rd column and the 7th column penetrated deep behind the Nationalist line, surrounding the enemy.

Not willing to risk losing any territory, Chen Cheng divided his force into half: half of the force would relieve the besieged southern front, while the remaining half would continue the push to Faku. The Communist resistance was much greater than nationalists had expected, resulting in neither half had the enough strength needed to complete their missions. On January 5, 1948, the Communist trap was completed and a full-scale assault on the besieged enemy was launched. Two days later on January 7, 1948, the Nationalist southern front was completely devastated, with the commander of the Newly Organized 5th Army and the commanders the 43rd division and the 195th division captured alive by the Communists. Learning the news of the defeat of the southern front, the Nationalist reinforcements to Faku and the southern front both withdrew back to Shenyang and Tieling.

Taking advantage of their new victory, the Communist 1st column and 8th column continued to push westward, taking Xinli Village (新立屯) by destroying the Nationalist 26th division of the 49th Army during its attempt to flee. The Communist 9th column, meanwhile, took Panshan by destroying the Nationalist 184th division of the 60th Army. However, the continuous offensives also exhausted the Communist supply and besieged Faku remained firmly in the Nationalist hand. Due to the continuous defeats, Chiang Kai-shek had to personally hold a military conference to readjust the Nationalist strategies on January 10, 1948, by flying to Shenyang from Nanjing, and replaced Chen Cheng with Wei Lihuang. In order to strengthen the Nationalist force in Northeast China, the Nationalist Reorganized 54th division was transferred from Shandong to Jinzhou. While Chen Cheng left northeast China with Chiang Kai-shek, the new Nationalist commander-in-chief in northeast China Wei Lihuang was preparing for the worst: giving up Jilin City and Changchun when necessary, while hold on to Shenyang with everything he got.

== Third Stage ==
The Communist took full advantage when new Nationalist commander-in-chief Wei Lihuang was busy reorganizing his defense by replenishing themselves at the same time. After half a month rest, the Communist resumed their offensive by concentrating their forces to the south of Shenyang. The Communist 4th column and 6th column besieged Liaoyang. To stop any possible Nationalist reinforcement, the Communist 1st column, 2nd column, 7th column, 8th column, and 9th column were deployed to Panshan and Dahushan, regions between Shenyang and Liaoyang, and regions between Jinzhou and Yi County.

On February 2, 1948, the Communist 4th column and the 6th column took Liaoyang after decimating the Nationalist 54th division that defended the city, and they continued their victory push southward, taking Anshan on February 19, 1948, after decimating the local garrison, the Nationalist 25th division. On February 24, 1948, the communist 4th column launched a long-distance strike at Yingkou, and although the 52nd Army, the local Nationalist garrison managed to beat back the Communist attack at the night of February 25, 1948, the Nationalist 58th division, the cream of the crop of the Nationalist 52nd Army, mutinied by defecting to the communist side under the leadership of the division commander Wang Jiashan (王家善). After southern Liaoning fell into the Communist hand, the defender of Faku, the Nationalist 62nd division of the Newly Organized 6th Army abandoned the city and attempted to breakout the siege, but was decimated on its way at the mouth of Tong River (通江) to the west of Kaiyuan, which fell into the Communist hand on February 29, 1948.

In order to completely cut the link between Changchun and Shenyang, the Communist decided to take Siping (city) by redeploying the 1st column, the 3rd column and the 7th column on February 29, 1948, from southern Liaoning to Siping (city), while the communist 2nd column, 6th column, 8th column, and the 10th column were already deployed two days ago on February 27, 1948, to Changtu and Kaiyuan to stop any possible Nationalist reinforcement to the city. On other fronts, faced with impossibility, on March 9, 1948, the Nationalist garrison of Jilin City, the 60th Army evacuated the city and retreated to Changchun by abandoning all heavy equipment. Under the brilliant leadership and direction of Wei Lihuang, the evacuation was a great success and was credited by the BBC as another equivalent of Dunkirk Evacuation on land. However, due to the urgency faced by the nationalists, the abandoned equipment and supplies were not destroyed and fell into the enemy hand intact, which significantly boosted the Communist strength. On March 12, 1948, the communist 1st column, the 3rd column and the 7th column launched their final assault on Siping (city), decimated the Nationalist 88th division of the 71st Army and other units defending the city within twenty-four hours. Two days after taking Siping (city), Communists declared the end of Winter Offensive of 1947 in Northeast China on March 15, 1948.

== Outcome ==
The nationalists lost a total of eight divisions plus one defected to the Communists, totaling 156,000 troops, and 17 cities and towns fell into the Communist hand. The Nationalist troops in northeast China was compressed into three isolated regions around Jinzhou, Changchun and Shenyang as a result of the three-month-long Winter Offensive of 1947 in Northeast China, and the communist paved the way for the later victory in Liaoshen Campaign and Changchun.

Chen Cheng cannot be blamed for the Nationalist failure because as early as 1946, he had already realized the situation in northeast China was impossible for the Nationalist and correctly suggested to abandon the region to free more troops, so that when the situation in other parts of China had improved, the salvaged troops could be used to retake the region. However, Chen Cheng's good suggestion was denied because it was simply impossible for Chiang Kai-shek and the nationalists to give up northeast China, one of the richest region in China, and they were infatuated with holding on to the land as long as possible, and gain more land as much as possible. This doctrine stretched the Nationalist troops thin and provided the excellent opportunity for the enemy to eliminate the Nationalist garrisons one at a time, and as Chen Cheng faithfully carried out Chiang's impossible task, the failure was inevitable.

Chiang Kai-shek realized this mistake somewhat and thus did not punish Chen Cheng by simply transferring him out of northeast China and Chiang corrected his mistake by giving Chen Cheng's successor, Wei Lihuang full authority to direct the campaign, which Wei did to his best ability with great result. Hence, not only the loss of territory in the latter stage of the campaign cannot be simply regard as Nationalist failure, but a Nationalist success, because it was part of strategy to take the initiative by concentrating the force by giving up the territory that was impossible to defend, and defending the strongholds that were easy to protect against enemy's assaults. However, once the initiative was achieved, the Nationalist high command begun its usual interference with local command once again by completely changing the strategy into something brand new and totally impossible, and such interference due to the strategic disagreement between the local commanders and the high command at Nanjing lasted all the way into the Liaoshen Campaign, not only negating the initiative achieved, but also resulting in greater failure later.

== See also ==
- Outline of the Chinese Civil War
- National Revolutionary Army
- History of the People's Liberation Army
