= Inner Mongolia College of Farming and Animal Husbandry =

University in Tongliao, China

Inner Mongolia College of Farming and Animal Husbandry is located in Tongliao, Inner Mongolia, China. It was merged into the Inner Mongolia University for Nationalities.
