= Holingol Huolinhe Airport =

Airport in Inner Mongolia, China

Holingol Huolinhe Airport 霍林郭勒霍林河机场
- IATA: HUO; ICAO: ZBHZ

Summary
- Airport type: Public
- Serves: Holingol, Inner Mongolia, China
- Opened: 2 June 2017
- Coordinates: 45°29′14″N 119°24′26″E

Map
- Location of airport in Inner Mongolia

Runways
Direction	Length		Surface
Direction	m	ft	Surface
11/29	2,700	8,858

Statistics (2021)
- Passengers: 100,227
- Aircraft movements: 1,896
- Cargo (metric tons): 5.9

Holingol Huolinhe Airport
- Simplified Chinese: 霍林郭勒霍林河机场
- Traditional Chinese: 霍林郭勒霍林河機場
Transcriptions
Standard Mandarin
- Hanyu Pinyin: Huòlínguōlè Huòlínhé Jīchǎng

Huolinguole (Huolingol) Huolinhe Airport (IATA: HUO, ICAO: ZBHZ) is an airport serving the city of Holingol in Tongliao, Inner Mongolia, China. It is located about 30 kilometres (19 mi) southwest of the city center. Construction of the airport began in August 2013, and the first inspection flight was conducted on 20 September 2016. It was opened on 2 June 2017.

== Facilities ==
The airport has a runway that is 2,700 metres (8,900 ft) long and 45 metres (148 ft) wide (class 4C), and a 7,471-square-meter terminal building with two jet bridges. It is capable of handling narrow-body aircraft such as the Boeing 737 and the Airbus A320. It is projected to handle 150,000 passengers and 1000 tons of cargo annually by 2020.

== Airlines and destinations ==
Airlines	Destinations
GX Airlines	Chifeng, Jinan
Hainan Airlines	Beijing–Capital
Ruili Airlines	Hohhot, Shenyang

== See also ==
- List of airports in China
- List of the busiest airports in China
