= G91 Central Liaoning Ring Expressway =

Ring road in Liaoning, China

Central Liaoning Ring Expressway
- 辽中地区环线高速公路
- Liaozhong Ring Expressway 辽中环线高速

Route information
- Length: 399 km (248 mi)
- Existed: 2018–present

Major junctions
- Orbital around Shenyang and Central Liaoning
- G1113 in Benxi, Liaoning; G15 in Liaoyang, Liaoning; G1 in Liaozhong County, Shenyang, Liaoning; G1113 in Xinmin, Shenyang, Liaoning; Liaoning S2 in Faku County, Shenyang, Liaoning; G1 in Tieling, Liaoning; G1212 in Fushun, Liaoning

Location
- Country: China

Highway system
- National Trunk Highway System; Primary; Auxiliary; National Highways; Transport in China
← G8517	→ G9111

The Liaozhong Ring Expressway (simplified Chinese: 辽中环线高速; traditional Chinese: 遼中環線高速), officially the Central Liaoning Ring Expressway (simplified Chinese: 辽宁中部环线高速公路; traditional Chinese: 遼寧中部環線高速公路) and designated G91, is an orbital expressway encircling the city of Shenyang and central Liaoning in the People's Republic of China. It is 399 km (248 mi) in length. Construction began in 2005, and the expressway was completed in December 2018.

== Route ==
The kilometre zero marker of the expressway is located at an interchange with the G1113 Dandong–Fuxin Expressway south of the city centre of Benxi. The expressway encircles around the various counties and cities that surround the city of centre of Shenyang, with the kilometre posts increasing clockwise. The expressway does not actually reach into the city center of Shenyang itself. Clockwise from Benxi, these are:

- Benxi
- Liaoyang
- Liaozhong County
- Xinmin
- Tieling
- Fushun
- Back to Benxi
