= Gu Chunli =

Chinese politician

- 谷春立

Vice-Governor of Jilin
- In office January 2013 – August 2015
- Governor: Jiang Chaoliang

Communist Party Secretary of Anshan
- In office August 2010 – January 2013
- Preceded by: Zhang Jiehui
- Succeeded by: Wang Shiwei

Mayor of Anshan
- In office April 2006 – August 2010
- Preceded by: Zhang Jiehui
- Succeeded by: Wang Yang

Personal details
- Born: July 1957 (age 69) Jinzhou, Liaoning, China
- Party: Chinese Communist Party (1984–2015; expelled)
- Education: Northeastern University

Gu Chunli (Chinese: 谷春立; pinyin: Gǔ Chūnlì; born July 1957) is a former Chinese politician who spent most of his career in Northeast China's Liaoning province. He was investigated by the Chinese Communist Party's anti-graft agency in August 2015. He previously served as the Vice-Governor of Jilin and Communist Party Secretary of Anshan.

== Life and career ==
Gu was born in Jinzhou, Liaoning, in July 1957. During the Down to the Countryside Movement, he was a Sent-down youth and performed manual labour in Changtan Township, Liaozhong County.

After the Cultural Revolution, he was accepted to Northeast Engineering Institute (now Northeastern University) in 1978 and graduated in 1982, where he majored in Mechanical Engineering.

He joined the workforce in August 1975, and joined the Chinese Communist Party in 1984. Beginning in 1982, he served in several posts in Shenyang Chemical Equipment Plant, including secretary, technician, deputy director, and section chief. Then he served in various posts in Liaoning provincial government before serving as assistant mayor of Shenyang in 2002.

In 2005, he was transferred to Anshan and appointed the Vice-Mayor and Deputy Communist Party Secretary. Five years later he was promoted to the Communist Party Secretary position. He was promoted to Vice-Governor of Jilin in 2013.

He was a delegate to the 11th National People's Congress.

== Downfall ==
On August 1, 2015, the Communist Party's anti-corruption agency announced that Gu Chunli was placed under investigation. Six days later, Gu was removed from his posts by the Organization Department of the Chinese Communist Party. Gu was the first provincial-level official from Jilin to be sacked since the anti-corruption campaign began in 2012. He was expelled from the Communist Party on October 30, 2015. The investigation concluded that Gu abused his power to advance the interests of others, used public funds for personal expenses, frequented private clubs, accepted bribes, accepted banquet invitations paid for by public funds, "used vehicles from state-owned enterprises", and interfered and obstructed the investigation.

On March 31, 2017, Gu was sentenced on 12 years in prison for taking bribes worth 43.65 million yuan (~$6.34 million) by the Intermediate People's Court in Harbin.
