= Liu Qiang (politician, born 1964) =

Chinese politician

- 刘强

Vice-Governor of Liaoning
- In office January 2013 – December 2017
- Governor: Chen Qiufa

Communist Party Secretary of Fushun
- In office February 2008 – January 2013
- Preceded by: Zhou Zhongxuan
- Succeeded by: Wang Guifen

Mayor of Fushun
- In office January 2005 – February 2008
- Preceded by: Wang Daping
- Succeeded by: Wang Yang

Personal details
- Born: February 1964 (age 62) Faku County, Liaoning, China
- Party: Chinese Communist Party (expelled; 1986-2018)
- Education: Dalian University of Technology; Northeastern University; Central Party School of the Chinese Communist Party
- Occupation: Politician, engineer

Chinese name
- Traditional Chinese: 劉強
- Simplified Chinese: 刘强
Transcriptions
Standard Mandarin
- Hanyu Pinyin: Liú Qiáng

Liu Qiang (Chinese: 刘强; born February 1964) is a Chinese politician who spent his entire career in his home province Liaoning in northeast China. He joined the Chinese Communist Party in April 1986 and entered the workforce in July 1990. He was investigated by the Chinese Communist Party's anti-graft agency in November 2017. At the height of his career, he served as vice-governor of Liaoning. He was a delegate to the 10th National People's Congress and 11th National People's Congress. He was also a delegate to the 16th National Congress of the Chinese Communist Party and 18th National Congress of the Chinese Communist Party. He is the first sitting senior official to be probed for suspected graft since the 19th National Congress of the Chinese Communist Party on October 24, 2017.

== Early life and education ==
Liu was born in Faku County, Shenyang, Liaoning in February 1964. He was educated in Dalian University of Technology from August 1983 to July 1990, where he majored in chemical engineering.

After graduation, he was assigned to Fushun Ethylene Chemical Plant (later renamed Fushun Petrochemical Corporation), a subsidiary of China National Petroleum Corporation, he remained in the plant until May 1995, when he was transferred to Fushun Petrochemical Company. He then continued working there, holding positions as factory deputy director, assistant manager, and manager. From March 2000 to April 2003, he studied at Northeastern University, where he earned his doctor's degree in management science and engineering. In November 2001, he was promoted to become general manager and party chief, he held that positions until March 2004.

== Political career ==
Liu began his political career in March 2004, when he became the deputy party chief and vice-mayor of Fushun. In February 2008, he was promoted to Communist Party Secretary, the top political position in the city. From September 2008 to January 2009, he studied at the Central Party School of the Chinese Communist Party as a part-time student. In January 2013, he was promoted again to become vice-governor of Liaoning, he was responsible for industry, science, technology, quality and technical supervision.

== Downfall ==
On November 23, 2017, the Central Commission for Discipline Inspection said in a statement on its website that Liu Qiang has been placed under investigation for "serious violations of discipline" by the party's disciplinary body. He was expelled from the Communist Party on February 5, 2018. Liu came under investigation for links to an election scandal in Liaoning in which 45 National People's Congress deputies and 523 deputies to the provincial congress were involved in vote buying in 2013. The Standing Committee of the National People's Congress, China's top legislature, disqualified the 45 deputies, and 523 provincial deputies resigned or were disqualified.

On November 22, 2018, Liu Qiang stood trial for taking bribes and disrupting elections at the 3rd Intermediate People's Court of Beijing. He took advantage of his different posts to help others on issues such as business operation, project contracts and job promotion. He was charged with accepting money and property worth more than 10.63 million yuan (about 1.53 million U.S. dollars) personally or through others between 2000 and 2017. On April 9, 2019, Liu was sentenced on 12 years in prison and fined 1.2 million yuan for taking bribes and vote-buying.

== Awards ==
Year	Nominated work	Award
2002	Ten Outstanding Youth in Liaoning	Won
2002	13th Ten Outstanding Youth in China	Nominated
2003	14th Ten Outstanding Youth in China	Nominated
2004	National Labor Medal	Won

Government offices
Preceded by Wang Daping (王大平)	Mayor of Fushun; 2004-2008	Succeeded by Wang Yang
Party political offices
Preceded by Zhou Zhongxuan (周忠轩)	Communist Party Secretary of Fushun; 2008-2013	Succeeded by Wang Guifen (王桂芬)
