= Horqin =

Horqin may refer to:

- Horqin District, in Tongliao, Inner Mongolia, China
- Horqin Left Back Banner, subdivision of Inner Mongolia, China
- Horqin Left Middle Banner, subdivision of Inner Mongolia, China
- Horqin Right Front Banner, subdivision of Inner Mongolia, China
- Horqin Right Middle Banner, subdivision of Inner Mongolia, China
- Ar Horqin Banner, subdivision of Inner Mongolia, China
