= Zhang Jiehui =

Chinese politician (born 1957)

- 张杰辉

Vice Chairman of the Hebei People's Congress
- In office January 2017 – December 2017
- Chairman: Zhao Kezhi

Vice Governor of Hebei
- In office August 2010 – January 2017
- Governor: Chen Quanguo→Zhang Qingwei

Communist Party Secretary of Anshan
- In office December 2005 – August 2010
- Preceded by: Li Yingjie
- Succeeded by: Gu Chunli

Mayor of Anshan
- In office November 2020 – December 2005
- Preceded by: Zhang Lifan
- Succeeded by: Gu Chunli

Personal details
- Born: January 1957 (age 69) Kuandian, Liaoning, China
- Party: Chinese Communist Party (1976-2018, expelled)
- Education: Shenyang University of Chemical Technology; Northeastern University

Chinese name
- Traditional Chinese: 張傑輝
- Simplified Chinese: 张杰辉
Transcriptions
Standard Mandarin
- Hanyu Pinyin: Zhāng Jiéhuī

Zhang Jiehui (Chinese: 张杰辉; born January 1957) is a former Chinese politician who served as a Vice Chairman of the Hebei People's Congress. He was dismissed from his position in December 2017 for investigation by the Central Commission for Discipline Inspection.

== Career ==
Zhang Jiehui was born in January 1957, and he was entered to Shenyang Chemical Technology Institute in 1978. In 1982, he entered to work at Liaoyang Petrochemical Company (辽阳石油化纤公司), then he was appointed as the deputy county chief of Dengta County in 1986. Later he was named as the Director of Industrial Economics Branch of the Planning Commission of Liaoning Province and deputy director of Petrochemical Industry Department.

In 1998, Zhang was appointed as the Deputy Mayor of Panjin, then he moved to the CPC Liaoning Committee, and became the Policy Research Director. He was appointed as the Mayor of Anshan in 2000, and promoted to the Chinese Communist Party Committee Secretary in 2005.

In 2010, Zhang was appointed as the Vice Governor of Hebei, then he was appointed as the deputy director of Hebei People's Congress in 2017.

== Incarceration for bribery ==
On December 12, 2017, Zhang Jiehui was placed under investigation by the Central Commission for Discipline Inspection, the Chinese Communist Party's internal disciplinary body, for "serious violations of regulations". He was expelled from the Chinese Communist Party and dismissed from public office on February 9, 2018.

On July 29, he has been indicted on suspicion of accepting bribes. On October 18, Taiyuan Intermediate People's Court heard Zhang's case. He was accused of taking advantage of his different positions in Liaoning and Hebei between 2001 and 2017 to seek profits for various companies and individuals in business development, obtaining bank loans and enterprise acquisition, as well as project land approval and job promotions, in return for bribes paid in cash or gifts worth more than 126 million yuan ($18.2 million).

On July 10, 2020, he was sentenced to 15 years in prison for taking bribes and also had 6 million yuan (about 858,000 U.S. dollars) worth of personal assets confiscated.

Party political offices
Preceded by ?	Director of Policy Research Office of Liaoning Provincial Committee of the Chinese Communist Party; 1999–2000	Succeeded by Zhu Shaoyi
Preceded by Li Yingjie	Communist Party Secretary of Anshan; 2005–2010	Succeeded by Gu Chunli
Government offices
Preceded by Zhang Lifan	Mayor of Anshan; 2000–2005	Succeeded by Gu Chunli
