= Jarud Banner =

Jarud Banner 扎鲁特旗 • ᠵᠠᠷᠤᠳ ᠬᠣᠰᠢᠭᠤ
- Banner
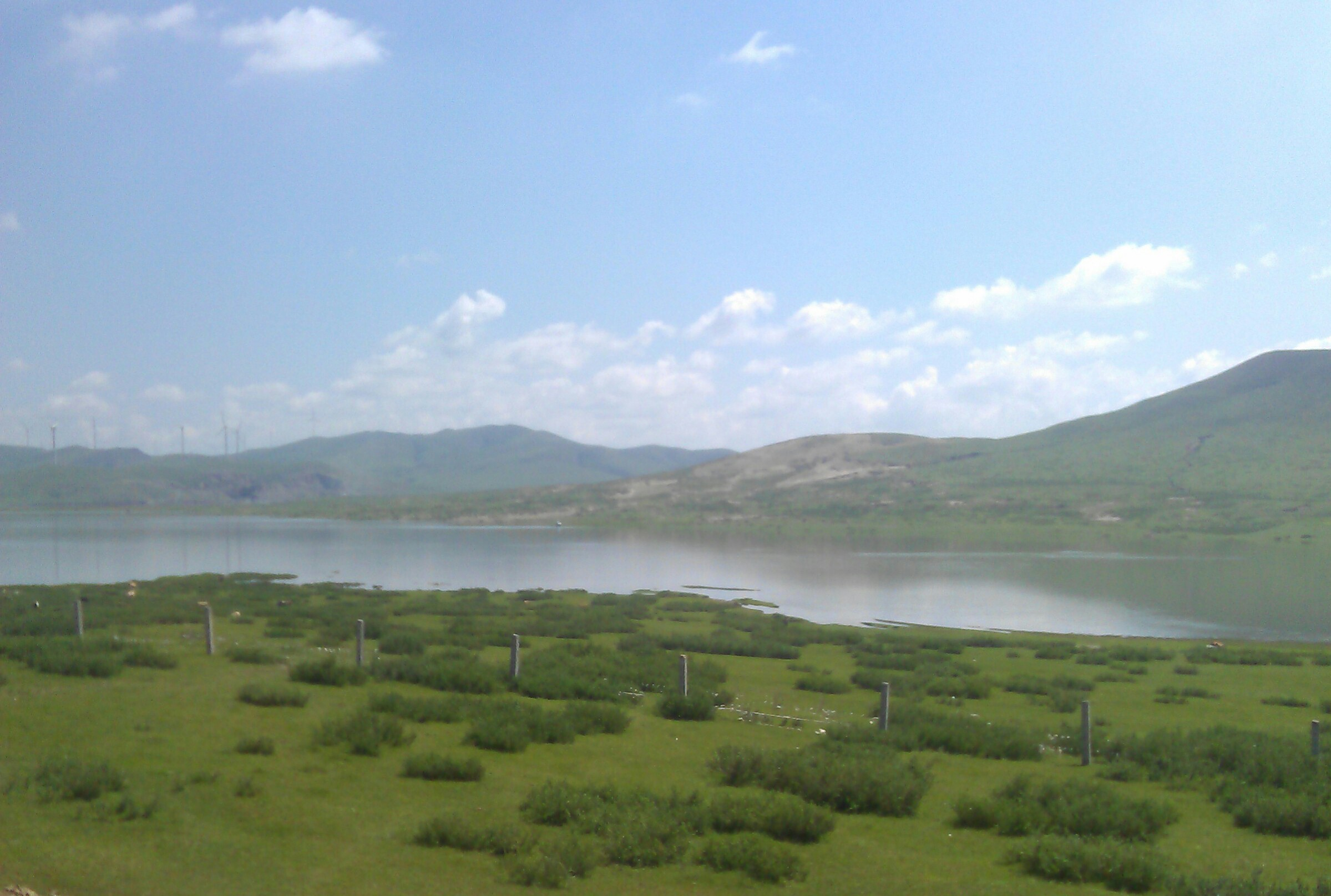

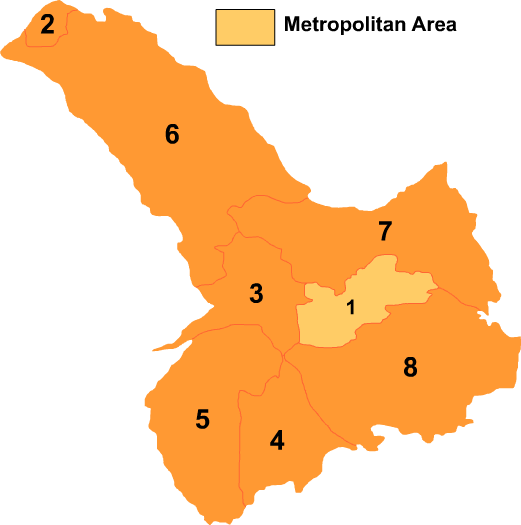
- Tongliao divisions: Jarud Banner is 6 on this map

- Location in Inner Mongolia Jarud (China)
- Coordinates: 44°33′N 120°55′E
- Country: China
- Autonomous region: Inner Mongolia
- Prefecture-level city: Tongliao
- Banner seat: Lubei

Area
  - Total: 16,490 km^{2} (6,370 sq mi)
- Elevation: 264 m (866 ft)

Population (2020)
  - Total: 251,806
  - Density: 15.27/km^{2} (39.55/sq mi)
- Time zone: UTC+8 (China Standard)
- Website: www.zhalute.gov.cn

Jarud Banner

Chinese name
- Simplified Chinese: 扎鲁特旗
- Traditional Chinese: 扎魯特旗
Transcriptions
Standard Mandarin
- Hanyu Pinyin: Zālǔtè Qí

Mongolian name
- Mongolian Cyrillic: Жаруд хошуу
- Mongolian script: ᠵᠠᠷᠤᠳ ᠬᠣᠰᠢᠭᠤ
Transcriptions
- SASM/GNC: Jarud qosiɣu

Jarud Banner (Mongolian: ᠵᠠᠷᠤᠳ ᠬᠣᠰᠢᠭᠤ; Chinese: 扎鲁特旗) is a banner of eastern Inner Mongolia, China. It is under the administration of Tongliao City, 150 kilometres (93 mi), and the China National Highway 304 passes through the area.

== Demographics ==
The proportion of nationalities in Jarud Banner (2020)
Nationality	Percentage
Mongols	50.1%
Han	47.0%
Manchus	2.6%
Hui People	0.2%
Others	0.1%
Source of the population statistics :

== Administrative divisions ==
Jarud Banner is made up of 7 towns, 8 sums, and 4 farm and pasture areas.

Name	Simplified Chinese	Hanyu Pinyin	Mongolian (Hudum Script)	Mongolian (Cyrillic)	Administrative division code
Towns
Lubei Town	鲁北镇	Lǔběi Zhèn	ᠯᠦᠪᠧᠢ ᠪᠠᠯᠭᠠᠰᠤ	Лүбей балгас	150526100
Huanghuashan Town	黄花山镇	Huánghuāshān Zhèn	ᠬᠤᠸᠠᠩ ᠬᠤᠸᠠ ᠱᠠᠨ ᠪᠠᠯᠭᠠᠰᠤ	Хуан ухаа шин балгас	150526101
Gahait Town	嘎亥图镇	Gāhàitú Zhèn	ᠭᠠᠬᠠᠢᠲᠤ ᠪᠠᠯᠭᠠᠰᠤ	Гахайт балгас	150526102
Jurh Town	巨日合镇	Jùrìhé Zhèn	ᠵᠢᠷᠦᠬᠡ ᠪᠠᠯᠭᠠᠰᠤ	Зүрх балгас	150526103
Bayart Huxu Town	巴雅尔吐胡硕镇	Bāyǎ'ěrtǔhúshuò Zhèn	ᠪᠠᠶᠠᠷᠲᠤᠬᠤᠰᠢᠭᠤ ᠪᠠᠯᠭᠠᠰᠤ	Баяртхошуу балгас	150526104
Xiangshan Town	香山镇	Xiāngshān Zhèn	ᠰᠢᠶᠠᠩ ᠱᠠᠨ ᠪᠠᠯᠭᠠᠰᠤ	Шиян шин балгас	150526105
Ar Hondlon Town	阿日昆都楞镇	Ārìkūndūléng Zhèn	ᠠᠷᠤ ᠬᠥᠨᠳᠡᠯᠡᠨ ᠪᠠᠯᠭᠠᠰᠤ	Ар хөндлөн балгас	150526106
Sums
Bayan Tal Sum	巴彦塔拉苏木	Bāyàntǎlā Sūmù	ᠪᠠᠶᠠᠨᠲᠠᠯ᠎ᠠ ᠰᠤᠮᠤ	Баянтөл сум	150526200
Olji Moron Sum	乌力吉木仁苏木	Wūlìjímùrén Sūmù	ᠥᠯᠵᠡᠢᠮᠦ᠋ᠷᠡᠨ ᠰᠤᠮᠤ	Өлзиймран сум	150526201
Dolod Sum	道老杜苏木	Dàolǎodù Sūmù	ᠳᠣᠯᠣᠳᠤ ᠰᠤᠮᠤ	Долду сум	150526202
Ger Qulu Sum	格日朝鲁苏木	Gérìcháolǔ Sūmù	ᠭᠡᠷᠴᠢᠯᠠᠭᠤ ᠰᠤᠮᠤ	Хэрчлуу сум	150526203
Qandmun Sum	前德门苏木	Qiándémén Sūmù	ᠴᠢᠨᠳᠠᠮᠤᠨᠢ ᠰᠤᠮᠤ	Чандмэнэ сум	150526204
Ulan Had Sum	乌兰哈达苏木	Wūlánhādá Sūmù	ᠤᠯᠠᠭᠠᠨᠬᠠᠳᠠ ᠰᠤᠮᠤ	Улаанахта сум	150526205
Qabagt Sum	查布嘎图苏木	Chábùgātú Sūmù	ᠴᠢᠪᠠᠭᠠᠲᠤ ᠰᠤᠮᠤ	Чавгаат сум	150526206
Unegq Sum	乌额格其苏木	Wū'égéqí Sūmù	ᠦᠨᠡᠭᠡᠴᠢ ᠰᠤᠮᠤ	Үнэгч сум	150526207
Others
Unegq Pasture	乌额格其牧场	Wū’égéqí Mùchǎng	ᠦᠨᠡᠭᠡᠴᠢ ᠮᠠᠯᠵᠢᠯ ᠤᠨ ᠲᠠᠯᠠᠪᠠᠢ	Үнэгч малжлын талбай	150526400
Xiangshan Farm	香山农场	Xiāngshān Nóngchǎng	ᠰᠢᠶᠠᠩ ᠱᠠᠨ ᠲᠠᠷᠢᠶᠠᠯᠠᠩ ᠤᠨ ᠲᠠᠯᠠᠪᠠᠢ	Шиян шин тариалангийн талбай	150526401
Orgon Tal Farm	乌日根塔拉农场	Wūrìgēntǎlā Nóngchǎng	ᠥᠷᠭᠡᠨᠲᠠᠯ᠎ᠠ ᠲᠠᠷᠢᠶᠠᠯᠠᠩ ᠤᠨ ᠲᠠᠯᠠᠪᠠᠢ	Өргөндлөө тариалангийн талбай	150526402
Gadas Breeding Stock Farm	嘎达苏种畜场	Gādásū Zhǒngxùchǎng	ᠭᠠᠳᠠᠰᠤ ᠦᠷᠡᠰ ᠦᠨ ᠮᠠᠯᠵᠢᠯ ᠤᠨ ᠲᠠᠯᠠᠪᠠᠢ	Гадас үрсийн малжлын талбай	150526403

== Climate ==
Jarud Banner has a monsoon-influenced, continental semi-arid climate (Köppen BSk), with very cold and dry winters, hot, somewhat humid summers, and strong winds, especially in spring. The monthly 24-hour average temperature ranges from −12.2 °C (10.0 °F) in January to 24.1 °C (75.4 °F) in July, with the annual mean at 7.06 °C (44.7 °F). The annual precipitation is 362 millimetres (14.3 in), with more than half of it falling in July and August alone. There are 2,883 hours of bright sunshine annually, with each of the winter months having over two-thirds of the possible total, and this percentage falling to 54 in July.

Climate data for Jarud Banner, elevation 265 m (869 ft), (1991–2020 normals, extremes 1981–2017)
Month	Jan	Feb	Mar	Apr	May	Jun	Jul	Aug	Sep	Oct	Nov	Dec	Year
Record high °C (°F)	9.1 (48.4)	17.4 (63.3)	29.3 (84.7)	35.4 (95.7)	39.3 (102.7)	43.7 (110.7)	43.5 (110.3)	38.7 (101.7)	36.1 (97.0)	30.6 (87.1)	20.8 (69.4)	11.8 (53.2)	43.7 (110.7)
Mean daily maximum °C (°F)	−6.0 (21.2)	−1.1 (30.0)	6.6 (43.9)	16.5 (61.7)	24.0 (75.2)	28.4 (83.1)	30.2 (86.4)	28.8 (83.8)	23.8 (74.8)	14.9 (58.8)	3.2 (37.8)	−4.7 (23.5)	13.7 (56.7)
Daily mean °C (°F)	−11.8 (10.8)	−7.6 (18.3)	−0.1 (31.8)	9.7 (49.5)	17.4 (63.3)	22.4 (72.3)	24.8 (76.6)	22.9 (73.2)	16.8 (62.2)	7.9 (46.2)	−2.7 (27.1)	−10.2 (13.6)	7.5 (45.4)
Mean daily minimum °C (°F)	−16.1 (3.0)	−12.7 (9.1)	−5.9 (21.4)	3.1 (37.6)	10.9 (51.6)	16.6 (61.9)	19.7 (67.5)	17.7 (63.9)	10.8 (51.4)	2.3 (36.1)	−7.3 (18.9)	−14.3 (6.3)	2.1 (35.7)
Record low °C (°F)	−27.7 (−17.9)	−26.9 (−16.4)	−18.4 (−1.1)	−8.6 (16.5)	−0.4 (31.3)	4.7 (40.5)	11.6 (52.9)	8.5 (47.3)	0.2 (32.4)	−13.5 (7.7)	−20.7 (−5.3)	−26.1 (−15.0)	−27.7 (−17.9)
Average precipitation mm (inches)	0.7 (0.03)	0.8 (0.03)	3.5 (0.14)	10.1 (0.40)	33.7 (1.33)	75.1 (2.96)	121.7 (4.79)	77.0 (3.03)	29.4 (1.16)	12.7 (0.50)	2.6 (0.10)	1.7 (0.07)	369 (14.54)
Average precipitation days (≥ 0.1 mm)	1.7	0.9	2.2	3.5	6.7	11.4	11.4	9.4	6.2	3.7	2.0	1.9	61
Average snowy days	2.5	2.1	3.1	1.2	0	0	0	0	0	0.7	3.0	2.9	15.5
Average relative humidity (%)	44	38	35	32	38	53	64	64	53	45	45	47	47
Mean monthly sunshine hours	209.2	223.0	268.1	262.6	271.2	243.3	229.9	246.5	244.2	236.2	194.5	187.0	2,815.7
Percentage possible sunshine	73	75	72	65	59	52	49	57	66	71	68	69	65
Source: China Meteorological Administration

Climate data for Bayaertuhushuo Town, Jarud Banner, elevation 628 m (2,060 ft), (1991–2020 normals)
Month	Jan	Feb	Mar	Apr	May	Jun	Jul	Aug	Sep	Oct	Nov	Dec	Year
Mean daily maximum °C (°F)	−9.5 (14.9)	−4.7 (23.5)	3.0 (37.4)	13.3 (55.9)	21.1 (70.0)	25.4 (77.7)	27.4 (81.3)	26.1 (79.0)	21.2 (70.2)	12.2 (54.0)	0.4 (32.7)	−7.8 (18.0)	10.7 (51.2)
Daily mean °C (°F)	−15.6 (3.9)	−11.6 (11.1)	−3.9 (25.0)	6.3 (43.3)	14.2 (57.6)	19.1 (66.4)	21.6 (70.9)	19.6 (67.3)	13.5 (56.3)	4.8 (40.6)	−6.1 (21.0)	−13.7 (7.3)	4.0 (39.2)
Mean daily minimum °C (°F)	−20.5 (−4.9)	−17.5 (0.5)	−10.4 (13.3)	−1.2 (29.8)	6.5 (43.7)	12.3 (54.1)	15.9 (60.6)	13.4 (56.1)	6.3 (43.3)	−1.7 (28.9)	−11.6 (11.1)	−18.6 (−1.5)	−2.3 (27.9)
Average precipitation mm (inches)	0.8 (0.03)	1.7 (0.07)	4.6 (0.18)	8.8 (0.35)	34.7 (1.37)	89.5 (3.52)	123 (4.8)	82.8 (3.26)	36.6 (1.44)	13.9 (0.55)	3.7 (0.15)	1.8 (0.07)	401.9 (15.79)
Average precipitation days (≥ 0.1 mm)	1.3	1.6	3.1	4.4	7.8	13.6	14.1	11.0	7.3	4.2	3.1	2.2	73.7
Average snowy days	3.9	3.5	6.2	3.8	0.5	0.1	0	0	0.4	2.7	5.4	5.5	32
Average relative humidity (%)	54	49	44	36	40	59	70	70	59	49	53	56	53
Mean monthly sunshine hours	231.7	243.1	291.8	288.5	294.4	256.0	246.5	262.6	263.1	254.9	210.5	207.3	3,050.4
Percentage possible sunshine	81	82	78	71	64	55	53	61	71	76	75	76	70
Source: China Meteorological Administrationall-time July high

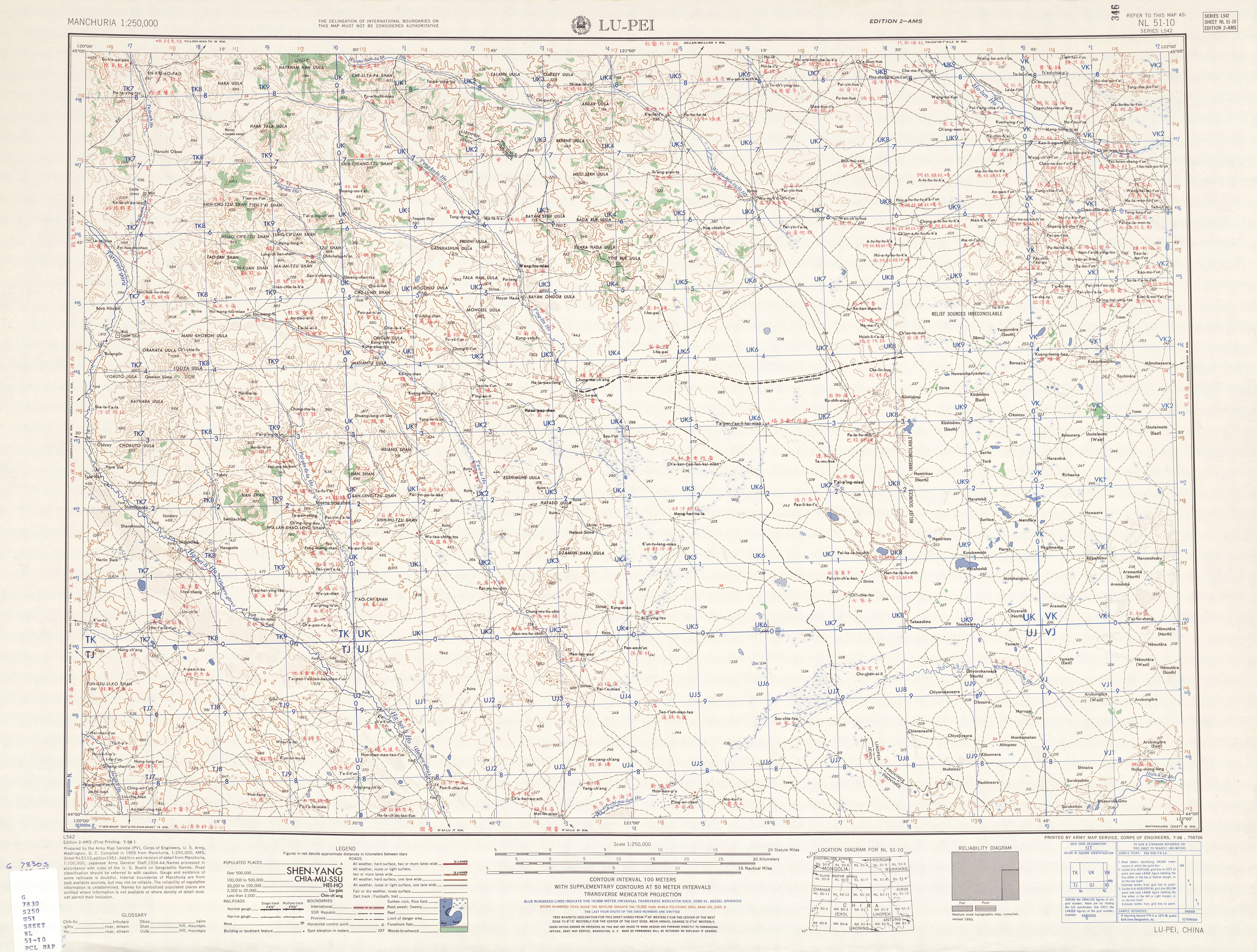
Map including part of Jarud Banner (AMS, 1955)

== See also ==
- Jaruud
