= G2504 Hangzhou Ring Expressway =

Circular expressway in Hangzhou, Zhejiang Province, China

Hangzhou Ring Expressway
- 杭州绕城高速公路
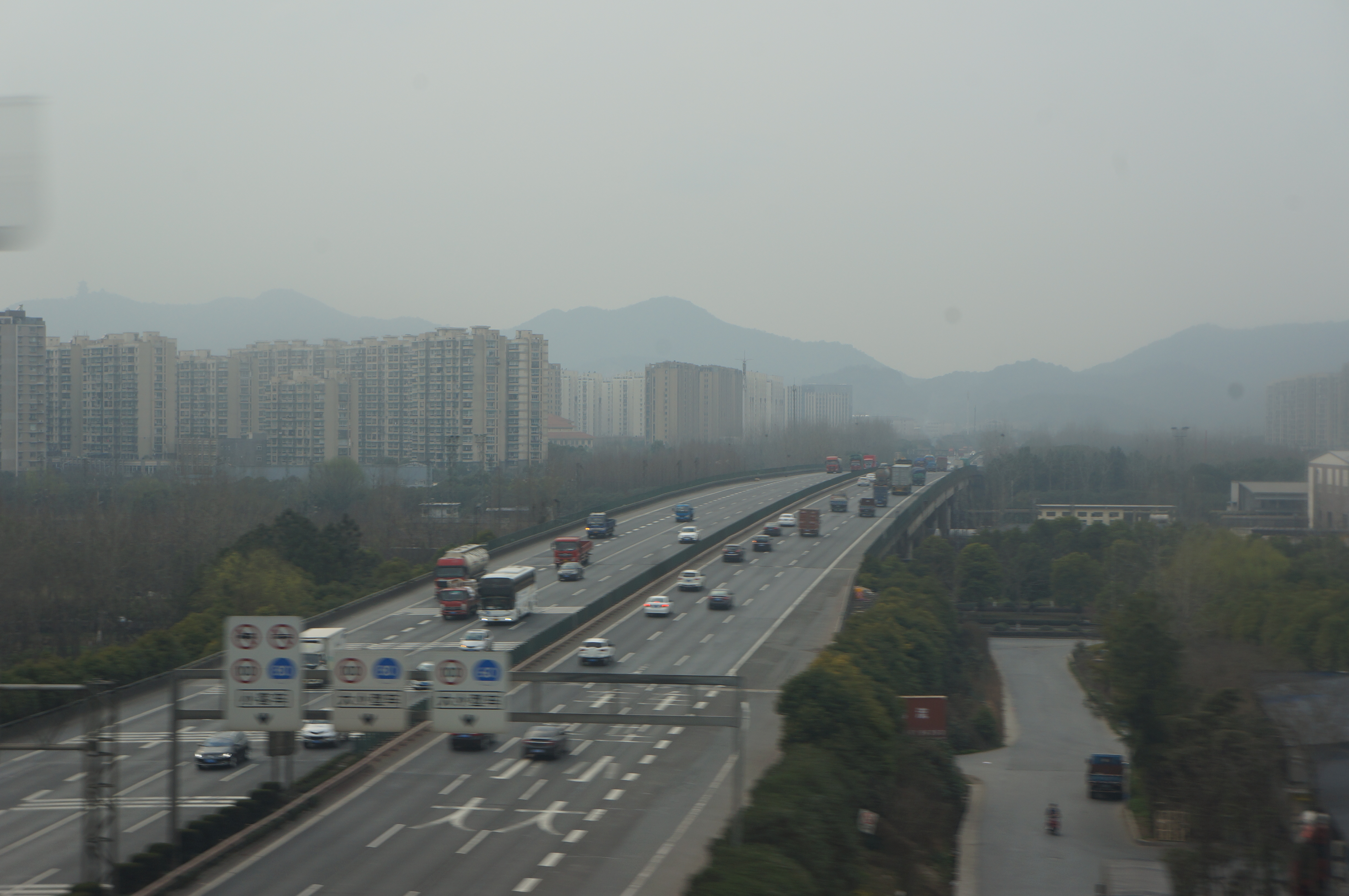
- Hangzhou Ring Expressway in March 2017

Route information
- Length: 123 km (76 mi)

Location
- Country: China

Highway system
- National Trunk Highway System; Primary; Auxiliary; National Highways; Transport in China
← G2503	→ G2511

The Hangzhou Ring Expressway (Chinese: 杭州绕城高速公路), designated as G2504, is 123-kilometre-long expressway (76 mi) in Hangzhou, Zhejiang, China.
