= China National Highway 304 =

Road in China

Coordinates: 44°31′55.1″N 121°0′30.7″E

National Highway 304
- 304国道

Route information
- Part of AH1
- Length: 889 km (552 mi)

Major junctions
- From: Dandong, Liaoning
- To: Holingol, Inner Mongolia

Location
- Country: China

Highway system
- National Trunk Highway System; Primary; Auxiliary
← G303	→ G305

China National Highway 304 (G304) runs northwest from Dandong, Liaoning towards Holingol, Inner Mongolia. It is 889 kilometres in length.

== Route and distance ==
Route and distance

City	Distance (km)
Dandong, Liaoning	0
Fengcheng, Liaoning	59
Nanfen District, Liaoning	171
Benxi, Liaoning	211
Shenyang, Liaoning	287
Xinmin, Liaoning	344
Zhangwu, Liaoning	397
Horqin Zuoyi Houqi, Inner Mongolia	460
Tongliao, Inner Mongolia	520
Jarud Qi, Inner Mongolia	714
Holingol, Inner Mongolia	889

== See also ==
- China National Highways
- AH1
