= Holingol =

City in Inner Mongolia, China with diverse population

Holingol 霍林郭勒市 • ᠬᠤᠤᠯᠢᠩᠭᠤᠤᠯ ᠬᠣᠲᠠ
- County-level city
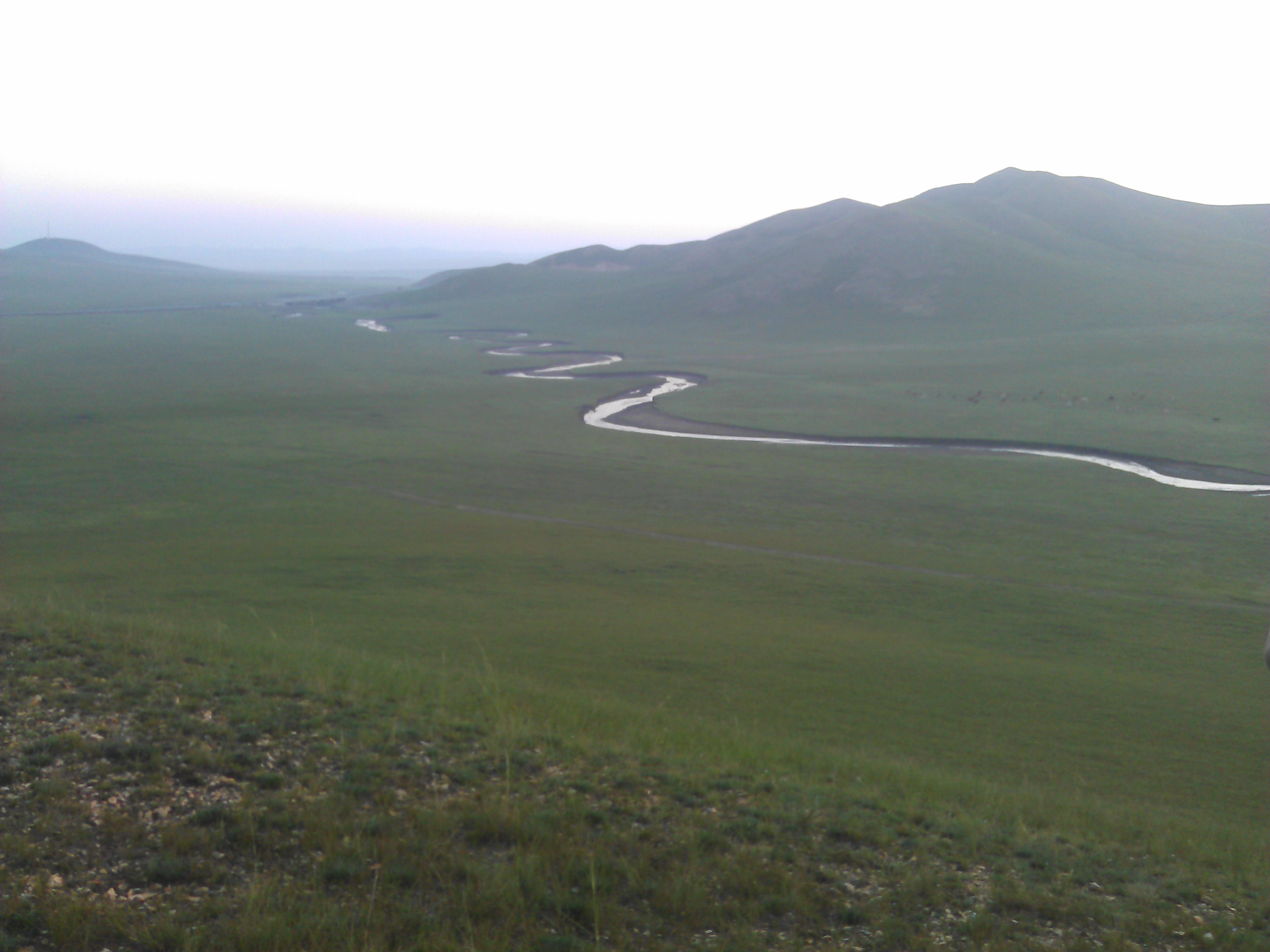

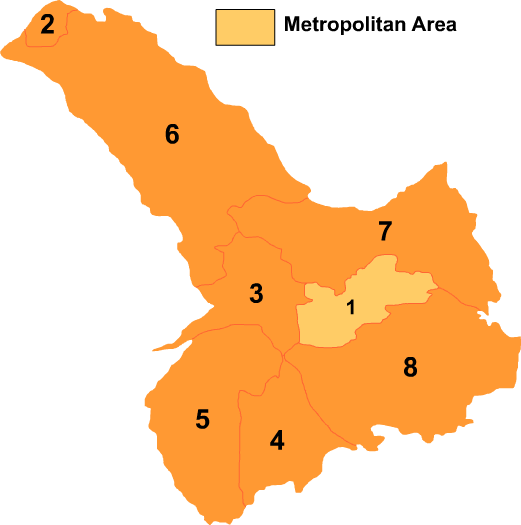
- Tongliao divisions: Holingol is 2 on this map

- Location in Inner Mongolia Holingol (China)
- Coordinates: 45°32′00″N 119°39′10″E
- Country: China
- Autonomous region: Inner Mongolia
- Prefecture-level city: Tongliao
- Municipal seat: Mostai Subdistrict

Area
  - County-level city: 585.0 km^{2} (225.9 sq mi)
  - Urban: 36.04 km^{2} (13.92 sq mi)

Population (2020)
  - County-level city: 138,676
  - Density: 237.1/km^{2} (614.0/sq mi)
- Time zone: UTC+8 (China Standard)
- Postal code: 029200
- Area code: 0475
- GDP: 2008
- Total: CNY 13.1 billion USD 2.01 billion
- Per capita: CNY 187,142; USD 29,052
- Website: www.hlgls.gov.cn

Holingol

Chinese name
- Chinese: 霍林郭勒市
Transcriptions
Standard Mandarin
- Hanyu Pinyin: Huòlínguōlè Shì

Mongolian name
- Mongolian Cyrillic: Хоолингол хот
- Mongolian script: ᠬᠣᠣᠯᠢᠨ ᠭᠣᠤᠯ ᠬᠣᠲᠠ

Holingol (also Huolin Gol; Mongolian: ᠬᠤᠤᠯᠢᠩᠭᠤᠤᠯ
ᠬᠣᠲᠠ; Chinese: 霍林郭勒) is a county-level city of Inner Mongolia, China.

It has a population of more than 70,000, which includes 17 ethnic groups. It is the northernmost and westernmost county-level division of Tongliao.

== Administrative divisions ==
Holingol is made up of 4 subdistricts and 1 sum.

Name	Simplified Chinese	Hanyu Pinyin	Mongolian (Hudum Script)	Mongolian (Cyrillic)	Administrative division code
Subdistricts
Jus Hua Subdistrict	珠斯花街道	Zhūsīhuā Jiēdào	ᠵᠦᠰᠬᠤᠸᠠ ᠵᠡᠭᠡᠯᠢ ᠭᠤᠳᠤᠮᠵᠢ	Зүсхуа зээл гудамж	150581001
Mostai Subdistrict	莫斯台街道	Mòsītái Jiēdào	ᠮᠥᠰᠥᠲᠥ ᠵᠡᠭᠡᠯᠢ ᠭᠤᠳᠤᠮᠵᠢ	Мөст зээл гудамж	150581002
Bor Hujir Subdistrict	宝日呼吉尔街道	Bǎorìhūjí'ěr Jiēdào	ᠪᠣᠷᠬᠤᠵᠢᠷ ᠵᠡᠭᠡᠯᠢ ᠭᠤᠳᠤᠮᠵᠢ	Борхожир зээл гудамж	150581003
Xarhur Subdistrict	沙尔呼热街道	Shā'ěrhūrè Jiēdào	ᠰᠢᠷ᠎ᠠ ᠬᠦᠦᠷ ᠵᠡᠭᠡᠯᠢ ᠭᠤᠳᠤᠮᠵᠢ	Шар гүүр зээл гудамж	150581004
Sum
Dalai Huxu Sum	达来胡硕苏木	Dáláihúshuò Sūmù	ᠳᠠᠯᠠᠢᠬᠤᠰᠢᠭᠤ ᠰᠤᠮᠤ	Далайхашуу сум	150581200

Other: Holingol Military Horse Farm Ecological Reserve Management Committee (霍林郭勒市军马场生态保护区管理委员会)

== Climate ==
Climate data for Holingol, elevation 824 m (2,703 ft), (1991–2020 normals, extremes 1991–present)
Month	Jan	Feb	Mar	Apr	May	Jun	Jul	Aug	Sep	Oct	Nov	Dec	Year
Record high °C (°F)	−1.2 (29.8)	10.7 (51.3)	23.3 (73.9)	28.6 (83.5)	36.7 (98.1)	39.6 (103.3)	39.2 (102.6)	40.0 (104.0)	32.2 (90.0)	29.8 (85.6)	19.6 (67.3)	7.9 (46.2)	40.0 (104.0)
Mean daily maximum °C (°F)	−13.9 (7.0)	−8.9 (16.0)	0.5 (32.9)	11.3 (52.3)	19.6 (67.3)	24.3 (75.7)	27.0 (80.6)	25.5 (77.9)	19.7 (67.5)	10.6 (51.1)	−2.3 (27.9)	−11.9 (10.6)	8.5 (47.2)
Daily mean °C (°F)	−19.0 (−2.2)	−15.1 (4.8)	−5.9 (21.4)	4.3 (39.7)	12.6 (54.7)	17.9 (64.2)	20.9 (69.6)	18.9 (66.0)	12.3 (54.1)	3.3 (37.9)	−8.0 (17.6)	−16.6 (2.1)	2.1 (35.8)
Mean daily minimum °C (°F)	−23.3 (−9.9)	−20.4 (−4.7)	−12.0 (10.4)	−2.7 (27.1)	5.1 (41.2)	11.3 (52.3)	14.9 (58.8)	12.7 (54.9)	5.6 (42.1)	−2.8 (27.0)	−12.8 (9.0)	−20.7 (−5.3)	−3.8 (25.2)
Record low °C (°F)	−34.9 (−30.8)	−32.0 (−25.6)	−27.2 (−17.0)	−16.8 (1.8)	−3.7 (25.3)	1.2 (34.2)	5.9 (42.6)	1.1 (34.0)	−5.5 (22.1)	−15.1 (4.8)	−28.1 (−18.6)	−31.3 (−24.3)	−34.9 (−30.8)
Average precipitation mm (inches)	1.6 (0.06)	2.5 (0.10)	5.9 (0.23)	9.0 (0.35)	34.9 (1.37)	68.6 (2.70)	97.4 (3.83)	73.1 (2.88)	43.1 (1.70)	14.6 (0.57)	5.8 (0.23)	3.7 (0.15)	360.2 (14.17)
Average precipitation days (≥ 0.1 mm)	3.3	3.3	5.1	5.7	8.3	13.4	13.5	10.5	8.7	5.0	5.1	5.7	87.6
Average snowy days	9.3	8.0	9.7	4.6	0.9	0	0	0	0.5	4.7	9.9	12.3	59.9
Average relative humidity (%)	67	64	57	43	44	59	66	66	59	55	63	68	59
Mean monthly sunshine hours	201.5	221.0	271.8	271.4	268.0	231.6	229.3	247.7	236.0	231.0	184.8	170.6	2,764.7
Percentage possible sunshine	71	75	73	66	58	50	49	57	64	69	66	63	63
Source: China Meteorological Administration

== Transport ==
- China National Highway 304
- Inner Mongolia Provincial Highway 101
- Tonghuo Railway
- Huolinhe Airport

== Economy ==
- GDP: RMB ¥1.82 billion in 2004, RMB ¥5 billion in 2006, RMB ¥13.1 billion in 2008
- Pillar industries: stockbreeding, mining, tourism
- Composition of GDP in 2008: ¥0.16 billion in primary industry, ¥9.35 billion in secondary industry, ¥3.59 billion in third industry.

== Education ==
- At year-end of 2006, there are 15 primary and secondary schools and 5 kindergartens in the city.
- Number of students enrolled at year-end of 2006: 896 in kindergartens, 10637 in primary schools, 3049 in junior high schools, 2112 in senior high schools.
- Number of teachers at year-end of 2006: 1177 full-time teachers
- Percentage of children of the right age attending primary school in 2006: 100%
- Percentage of primary school graduates entering a higher school in 2006: 100%
- Percentage of junior high graduates entering a higher school in 2006: 95.24%

== Health ==
- Number of medical entities at year-end of 2006: 4
- Number of health-care entities at year-end of 2006: 2
- Number of hospital beds at year-end of 2006: 238
- Number of medical doctors, registered nurses and medical technicians at year end of 2006: 420
