= Wang Yang (Liaoning politician) =

Chinese politician

- 王阳

Vice-Chairman of the Liaoning People's Congress
- In office January 2013 – March 2016
- Chairman: Li Xi

Communist Party Secretary of Fuxin
- In office January 2012 – January 2013
- Preceded by: Pan Liguo (潘利国)
- Succeeded by: Zhang Tiemin (张铁民)

Mayor of Anshan
- In office August 2010 – January 2012
- Preceded by: Gu Chunli
- Succeeded by: Wang Shiwei (王世伟)

Mayor of Fushun
- In office February 2008 – August 2010
- Preceded by: Liu Qiang
- Succeeded by: Wang Guifen (王桂芬)

Personal details
- Born: February 1957 (age 69) Heyang County, Shaanxi
- Party: Chinese Communist Party (expelled)
- Children: Wang Shengqi (daughter)
- Education: Northeastern University; Liaoning University
- Occupation: Politician

Wang Yang (simplified Chinese: 王阳; traditional Chinese: 王陽; pinyin: Wáng Yáng; born February 1957) is a former Chinese politician. He held a series of positions in governments at the municipal and provincial level in northeast China's Liaoning province for more than 30 years. He was investigated by the Central Commission for Discipline Inspection in March 2016. At the time of his downfall, he was serving as vice-chairman of the Liaoning People's Congress.

== Biography ==
=== Early life and education ===
Wang was born in Heyang County, Shaanxi in February 1957. He was a sent-down youth during the Down to the Countryside Movement in Dawa County, Liaoning province. After the Cultural Revolution, he became a worker at Anshan Glass Factory. He entered Liaoning University in September 1979, majoring in philosophy, where he graduated in August 1983. After graduation, he taught at Anshan Training School for Cadres.

=== Career ===
He began his political career in January 1984, as an officer in the General Office of the Anshan municipal Chinese Communist Party (CCP) committee, rising to deputy director of the office nine years later. Then he successively served as CCP Committee Secretary of Jiubao District in May 1994 and Qianshan District in June 1996. During his term in office, he studied as a graduate student at Northeastern University, majoring in management engineering. In March 1999, he became secretary-general Anshan party committee, and four years later promoted to CCP Deputy Committee Secretary. In August 2004, he was elevated to secretary general of CCP Liaoning Provincial Committee, a position he held until February 2008, when he was appointed deputy party boss and acting mayor of Fushun. In August 2010, he was named deputy party boss and acting mayor of Anshan, and held that offices until January 2012, when he was promoted again to become party boss of Fuxin. In January 2013, Wang Yang rose to become vice-chairman of the Liaoning People's Congress.

=== Downfall ===
On March 16, 2016, Wang Yang was suspected of "serious violations of Party discipline", and placed under investigation by the Central Commission for Discipline Inspection (CCDI). Wang was expelled from the CCP on June 2, 2016, for violated Eight-point Regulation and bribery.

On May 31, 2017, Wang was sentenced on 16 years and 6 months in prison for taking bribes worth 62.91 million yuan (~$9.26 million) and vote-buying by the Intermediate People's Court in Daqing.

== Personal life ==
Wang Yang has a daughter, Wang Shengqi (王圣淇; born 1987), a graduate of the University of Manchester and Oxford University. In 2011, at the age of 24, she was appointed deputy dean of the International Education College of Liaoning University of Petroleum and Chemical Technology, a position at deputy-division level (副处级) on China's government administrative hierarchy.

Government offices
Previous: Liu Qiang	Mayor of Fushun; February 2008 – August 2010	Next: Wang Guifen (王桂芬)
Previous: Gu Chunli	Mayor of Anshan; August 2010 – January 2012	Next: Wang Shiwei (王世伟)
Party political offices
Previous: Pan Liguo (潘利国)	Communist Party Secretary of Fuxin; January 2012 – January 2013	Next: Zhang Tiemin (张铁民)
