= G9111 Benxi–Ji'an Expressway =

Road in China

Benxi–Ji'an Expressway
- 本溪－集安高速公路
- Benji Expressway 本集高速公路

Route information
- Auxiliary route of G91

Major junctions
- West end: Benxi, Liaoning
- East end: G1112 in Ji'an, Tonghua, Jilin

Location
- Country: China

Highway system
- National Trunk Highway System; Primary; Auxiliary; National Highways; Transport in China
← G91	→ G92

The G9111 Benxi–Ji'an Expressway (Chinese: 本溪—集安高速公路), also referred to as the Benji Expressway (Chinese: 本集高速公路), is an under construction expressway in China that connects Benxi, Liaoning to Ji'an, Jilin. Construction of the expressway started in October 2020 with two sections opening on 10 August 2022 and 28 September 2023.
