= Liaozhong District =

Liaozhong 辽中区
- District
- Location in Liaoning
- Coordinates: 41°30′36″N 122°43′48″E
- Country: People's Republic of China
- Province: Liaoning
- Sub-provincial city: Shenyang

Area
  - Total: 1,648 km^{2} (636 sq mi)
- Elevation: 16 m (52 ft)

Population (2020)
  - Total: 395,017
  - Density: 239.7/km^{2} (620.8/sq mi)
- Time zone: UTC+8 (China Standard)
- Postal code: 1102XX

Liaozhong District (simplified Chinese: 辽中区; traditional Chinese: 遼中區; pinyin: Liáozhōng Qū) is one of ten districts of the prefecture-level city of Shenyang, the capital of Liaoning Province, Northeast China. The name of the district literally means "Central Liao[ning]", referring to its central location within the province. It lies 67 km (42 mi) southwest of the downtown of Shenyang, near the intersection of G1 Beijing–Harbin Expressway and G91 Liaozhong Ring Expressway. As of 2020, it had a population of 395,017 residing in an area of 1,648 km^{2} (636 sq mi). It is the southernmost county-level division of Shenyang City, bordering Xinmin City to the north, and Tiexi District to the northeast, as well as the prefecture-level cities of Liaoyang to the southeast, Anshan to the south and southwest, and Jinzhou to the west.

== Administrative divisions ==
There are 14 towns and three townships within the district.

Towns:

- Liaozhong (辽中镇)
- Ciyutuo (茨榆坨镇)
- Yujiafang (于家房镇)
- Zhujiafang (朱家房镇)
- Lengzibao (冷子堡镇)
- Liu'erbao (刘二堡镇)
- Manduhu (满都户镇)
- Yangshigang (杨士岗镇)
- Xiaozhaimen (肖寨门镇)
- Chengjiao (城郊镇)
- Liujianfang (六间房镇)
- Yangshibao (养士堡镇)
- Panjiabao (潘家堡镇)
- Laoguantuo (老观坨镇)

Townships:

- Laodafang Township (老大房乡)
- Daheigangzi Township (大黑岗子乡)
- Niuxintuo Township (牛心坨乡)

== Climate ==
Climate data for Liaozhong, elevation 12 m (39 ft), (1991–2020 normals, extremes 1978–2025)
Month	Jan	Feb	Mar	Apr	May	Jun	Jul	Aug	Sep	Oct	Nov	Dec	Year
Record high °C (°F)	8.2 (46.8)	17.3 (63.1)	25.8 (78.4)	29.1 (84.4)	33.3 (91.9)	36.2 (97.2)	35.5 (95.9)	35.0 (95.0)	32.4 (90.3)	29.4 (84.9)	21.2 (70.2)	12.7 (54.9)	36.2 (97.2)
Mean daily maximum °C (°F)	−4.0 (24.8)	0.8 (33.4)	7.9 (46.2)	17.2 (63.0)	24.1 (75.4)	27.4 (81.3)	29.2 (84.6)	28.7 (83.7)	24.7 (76.5)	16.8 (62.2)	6.2 (43.2)	−1.9 (28.6)	14.8 (58.6)
Daily mean °C (°F)	−10.2 (13.6)	−5.4 (22.3)	1.9 (35.4)	10.7 (51.3)	17.9 (64.2)	22.2 (72.0)	24.7 (76.5)	23.7 (74.7)	18.1 (64.6)	10.3 (50.5)	0.7 (33.3)	−7.6 (18.3)	8.9 (48.1)
Mean daily minimum °C (°F)	−15.6 (3.9)	−10.9 (12.4)	−3.5 (25.7)	4.6 (40.3)	12.0 (53.6)	17.4 (63.3)	20.8 (69.4)	19.5 (67.1)	12.6 (54.7)	4.6 (40.3)	−4.1 (24.6)	−12.6 (9.3)	3.7 (38.7)
Record low °C (°F)	−33.7 (−28.7)	−30.1 (−22.2)	−16.9 (1.6)	−14.69 (5.56)	0.1 (32.2)	6.6 (43.9)	13.2 (55.8)	6.8 (44.2)	0.6 (33.1)	−8.2 (17.2)	−23.2 (−9.8)	−27.5 (−17.5)	−33.7 (−28.7)
Average precipitation mm (inches)	3.6 (0.14)	6.1 (0.24)	12.9 (0.51)	31.0 (1.22)	57.8 (2.28)	79.9 (3.15)	175.9 (6.93)	137.2 (5.40)	55.1 (2.17)	42.0 (1.65)	18.1 (0.71)	7.2 (0.28)	626.8 (24.68)
Average precipitation days (≥ 0.1 mm)	2.3	2.5	3.7	5.7	8.6	11.2	10.3	10.0	6.4	6.0	4.5	2.8	74
Average snowy days	3.5	3.2	3.0	0.8	0	0	0	0	0	0.4	3.3	4.0	18.2
Average relative humidity (%)	60	55	53	51	56	70	81	82	74	66	63	63	65
Mean monthly sunshine hours	193.2	199.0	235.5	233.2	260.9	230.1	205.2	217.6	233.7	213.3	173.1	173.3	2,568.1
Percentage possible sunshine	65	66	63	58	58	51	45	52	63	63	59	61	59
Source: China Meteorological Administration October all-time Records
