= Inner Mongolia University for Nationalities =

University in Tongliao, China

Inner Mongolia University for the Nationalities (ᠥᠪᠥᠷ ᠮᠣᠩᠭᠣᠯ ᠤᠨ ᠦᠨᠳᠦᠰᠦᠲᠡᠨ ᠦ ᠶᠡᠬᠡ ᠰᠤᠷᠭᠠᠭᠤᠯᠢ Öbür mongγol-un ündüsüten-ü yeke surγaγuli, 内蒙古民族大学, IMUN) is in Tongliao, Inner Mongolia, China, under the direct administration of the Chinese Government's Inner Mongolia Autonomous Region. IMUN is accredited by the Chinese government and recognized by the World Health Organization (WHO) and World Federation for Medical Education.

IMUN is renowned throughout China as a flagship ethnic minority university, with a focus on the Mongol Chinese ethnic minority group.

== History ==
Founded in 1958, the university merged with two other higher education institutions in 2000 to form a comprehensive university.

== Academics ==
IMUN consists of 22 departments and one teaching and research unit. The colleges include Humanities; Politics, Law and History; Educational Sciences; International Exchange; Mathematics and Computers; Physics and Electromechanics; Chemistry; Mongolian Medicine; Clinical Medicine; Agriculture; Veterinarian Sciences; Mongolian; Physical Sports; Foreign Languages; Arts; Adult Education; Life Sciences; Mechanical Engineering; Economics Management; and Vocational Technology. There are two hospitals attached to IMUN. Departments Department of Basic and Clinical 1-Medicine (M.B.B.S) 2-Department of Oral Medicine (B.D.S) 3-Department of Medicine 4-Department of Nursing. Its scientific research unit consists of 11 institutes: World History, Horqin Culture, Condensed State Physics, Computational Physics, Arable Farming, Seeds, and Mongolian Medicine. The university also offers postgraduate specialists medical training in its affiliated hospitals leading to the award of Master of medicine in various specialties.

The main library is adjacent to the Museum of the Inner Mongolia University of the Nationalities. A statue of four horses, a symbol of Mongolian culture and history, is prominent in front of these two buildings.

== Facilities ==
in 1972, the Affiliated Hospital of Inner Mongolia University for Nationalities was founded. The hospital is graded as a 3A-grade hospital, the highest grade in China's three-tiered public hospital system. It can house around 1,500 patients.
