= Zhangwu County =

Zhangwu 彰武县
- County
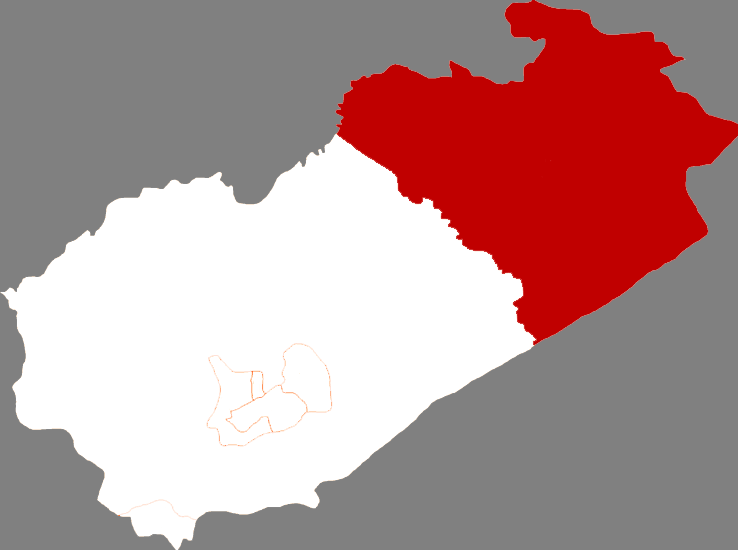
- Location in Fuxin City

- Location of the seat in Liaoning
- Coordinates: 42°23′N 122°32′E
- Country: People's Republic of China
- Province: Liaoning
- Prefecture-level city: Fuxin
- Township-level divisions: 8 towns; 12 townships; 4 ethnic townships
- County seat: Zhangwu Town (彰武镇)

Area
  - Total: 3,635 km^{2} (1,403 sq mi)
- Elevation: 84 m (276 ft)

Population (2020 census)
  - Total: 333,643
  - Density: 91.79/km^{2} (237.7/sq mi)
- Time zone: UTC+8 (China Standard)
- Postal code: 123200
- Area code: 0418
- Website: zhangwu.gov.cn

Zhangwu County (Chinese: 彰武; pinyin: Zhāngwǔ) is a county in the north of Liaoning province, China. It is under the administration of Fuxin City, the centre of which lies 82 kilometres (51 mi) to the southwest, with a population of 333,643 in 2020 residing in an area of 3,635 km^{2} (1,403 sq mi). It is served by G25 Changchun–Shenzhen Expressway, G2511 Xinmin–Lubei Expressway, and China National Highways 101 and 304.

== Climate ==
Zhangwu County has a monsoon-influenced humid continental climate (Köppen Dwa), with great seasonal contrast in temperature, precipitation, and humidity. Winters are long and cold, with a January average of −11.7 °C (10.9 °F), while summers are hot and humid, with a July average of 24.1 °C (75.4 °F). Precipitation is very low in winter and is heavily concentrated in the summer months. With monthly percent possible sunshine ranging from 46% in July to 67% in January and February, there are 2,673 hours of bright sunshine annually. The annual mean temperature is 7.88 °C (46.2 °F).

Climate data for Zhangwu County, elevation 79 m (259 ft), (1991–2020 normals, extremes 1981–2010)
Month	Jan	Feb	Mar	Apr	May	Jun	Jul	Aug	Sep	Oct	Nov	Dec	Year
Record high °C (°F)	7.2 (45.0)	16.4 (61.5)	21.4 (70.5)	32.6 (90.7)	36.0 (96.8)	38.3 (100.9)	36.8 (98.2)	36.7 (98.1)	34.9 (94.8)	28.2 (82.8)	20.3 (68.5)	12.5 (54.5)	38.3 (100.9)
Mean daily maximum °C (°F)	−4.9 (23.2)	0.1 (32.2)	7.5 (45.5)	16.9 (62.4)	24.1 (75.4)	27.8 (82.0)	29.3 (84.7)	28.5 (83.3)	24.5 (76.1)	16.2 (61.2)	5.1 (41.2)	−3.1 (26.4)	14.3 (57.8)
Daily mean °C (°F)	−11.3 (11.7)	−6.5 (20.3)	1.1 (34.0)	10.2 (50.4)	17.6 (63.7)	22.1 (71.8)	24.5 (76.1)	23.3 (73.9)	17.6 (63.7)	9.5 (49.1)	−0.7 (30.7)	−9.0 (15.8)	8.2 (46.8)
Mean daily minimum °C (°F)	−16.8 (1.8)	−12.3 (9.9)	−4.7 (23.5)	3.8 (38.8)	11.2 (52.2)	16.8 (62.2)	20.3 (68.5)	18.8 (65.8)	11.6 (52.9)	3.5 (38.3)	−5.8 (21.6)	−14.2 (6.4)	2.7 (36.8)
Record low °C (°F)	−36.3 (−33.3)	−32.3 (−26.1)	−18.4 (−1.1)	−9.8 (14.4)	−1.3 (29.7)	5.0 (41.0)	11.9 (53.4)	7.1 (44.8)	−1.2 (29.8)	−9.3 (15.3)	−24.1 (−11.4)	−31.2 (−24.2)	−36.3 (−33.3)
Average precipitation mm (inches)	2.0 (0.08)	3.2 (0.13)	8.9 (0.35)	23.1 (0.91)	49.5 (1.95)	82.0 (3.23)	135.3 (5.33)	119.7 (4.71)	34.3 (1.35)	26.8 (1.06)	13.1 (0.52)	2.9 (0.11)	500.8 (19.73)
Average precipitation days (≥ 0.1 mm)	1.9	1.7	3.0	5.0	8.3	11.3	11.3	10.2	6.6	5.2	3.4	2.2	70.1
Average snowy days	3.0	2.7	3.3	1.1	0	0	0	0	0	0.4	2.8	3.5	16.8
Average relative humidity (%)	55	48	46	46	51	66	78	79	69	60	58	58	60
Mean monthly sunshine hours	190.4	200.1	239.6	235.6	267.5	239.9	215.2	227.9	238.5	216.6	174.2	168.3	2,613.8
Percentage possible sunshine	65	67	64	59	59	53	47	54	64	64	60	60	60
Source: China Meteorological Administration

== Administrative divisions ==
There are eight towns, 12 townships, and four ethnic townships in the county.

Towns:

- Zhangwu (彰武镇)
- Harto (哈尔套镇)
- Zhanggutai (章古台镇)
- Dongliujiazi (东六家子镇)
- Wufeng (五峰镇)
- Fengjia (冯家镇)
- Houxinqiu (后新邱镇)
- A'erxiang (阿尔乡镇)

Townships:

- Liangjiazi Township (两家子乡)
- Shuangmiao Township (双庙乡)
- Ping'an Township (平安乡)
- Mantanghong Township (满堂红乡)
- Sibaozi Township (四堡子乡)
- Fengtian Township (丰田乡)
- Qianfuxingdi Township (前福兴地乡)
- Xinglongbao Township (兴隆堡乡)
- Xinglongshan Township (兴隆山乡)
- Dasijiazi Township (大四家子乡)
- Sihecheng Township (四合城乡)
- Dade Township (大德乡)
- Weizigou Mongol Ethnic Township (苇子沟蒙古族乡)
- Erdaohezi Mongol Ethnic Township (二道河子蒙古族乡)
- Xiliujiazi Mongol and Manchu Ethnic Township (西六家子蒙古族满族乡)
- Daleng Mongol Ethnic Township (大冷蒙古族乡)
