= Horqin District =

Horqin 科尔沁区 • ᠬᠣᠷᠴᠢᠨ ᠲᠣᠭᠣᠷᠢᠭ
- District
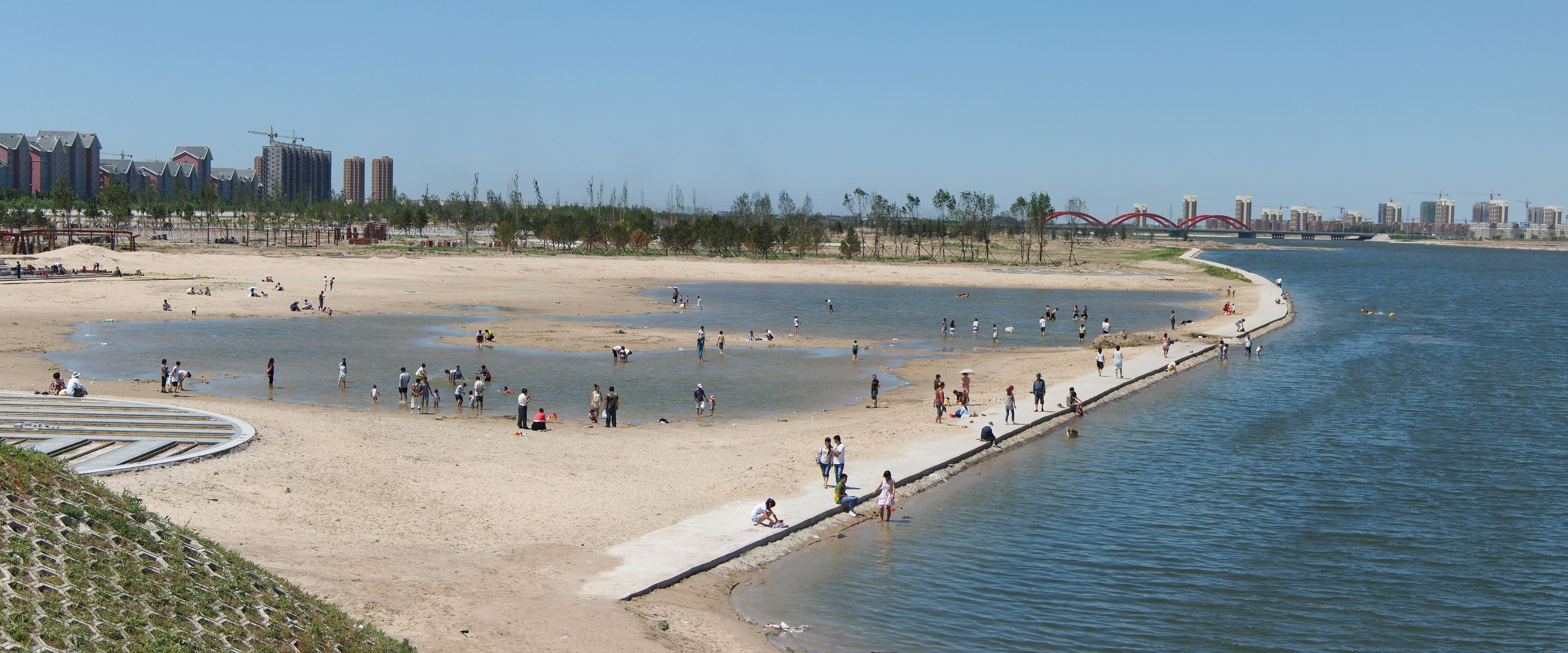
- Liaohe River Park under Construction

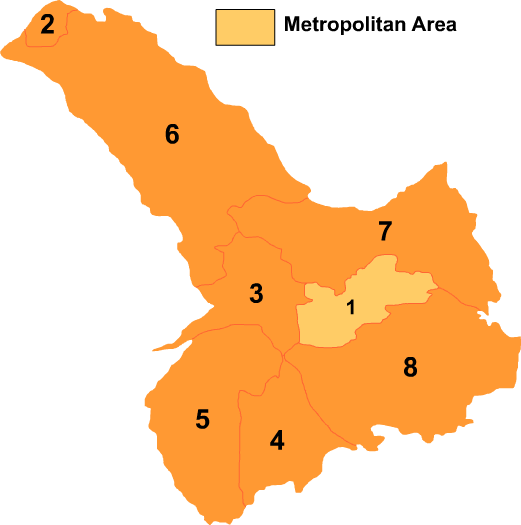
- Tongliao divisions: Horqin is 1 on this map

- Location within Inner Mongolia Location within China
- Coordinates: 43°37′21″N 122°15′21″E
- Country: China
- Autonomous region: Inner Mongolia
- Prefecture-level city: Tongliao
- District seat: Yongqing Subdistrict

Area
  - Total: 3,487 km^{2} (1,346 sq mi)
- Elevation: 179 m (587 ft)

Population (2020)
  - Total: 921,808
  - Density: 264.4/km^{2} (684.7/sq mi)
- Time zone: UTC+8 (China Standard)
- Website: www.keerqin.gov.cn

Horqin District

Chinese name
- Simplified Chinese: 科尔沁区
- Traditional Chinese: 科爾沁區
Transcriptions
Standard Mandarin
- Hanyu Pinyin: Kē'ěrqìn Qū

Mongolian name
- Mongolian Cyrillic: Хорчин тоори
- Mongolian script: ᠬᠣᠷᠴᠢᠨ ᠲᠣᠭᠣᠷᠢᠭ
Transcriptions
- SASM/GNC: Qorčin toɣoriɣ

Horqin District (Mongolian: ᠬᠣᠷᠴᠢᠨ ᠲᠣᠭᠣᠷᠢᠭ; Chinese: 科尔沁区) is an administrative district of the prefecture-level city of Tongliao, Inner Mongolia, China, and its seat of government.

The district was formed in January 1999 upon the creation of the prefecture-level city of Tongliao from the former Jirem League. The boundaries of the district is roughly coterminous with the core urban area of Tongliao.

The local Mongolian dialect spoken in the area is Khorchin Mongolian; most people in the district speak Mandarin Chinese (the most commonly spoken dialect is Northeastern Mandarin).

The Inner Mongolia University for the Nationalities is located in the district; it was founded in 2000 as an amalgamation of the Inner Mongolia Normal College of the Nationalities, the Mongol Medicine College of Inner Mongolia, and the Jirem College of Animal Husbandry.

== Administrative divisions ==
Horqin District is made up of 11 subdistricts, 9 towns, and 1 sum.

Name	Simplified Chinese	Hanyu Pinyin	Mongolian (Hudum Script)	Mongolian (Cyrillic)	Administrative division code
Subdistricts
Horqin Subdistrict	科尔沁街道	Kē'ěrqìn Jiēdào	ᠬᠣᠷᠴᠢᠨ ᠵᠡᠭᠡᠯᠢ ᠭᠤᠳᠤᠮᠵᠢ	Хорчин зээл гудамж	150502001
Ximen Subdistrict	西门街道	Xīmén Jiēdào	ᠪᠠᠷᠠᠭᠤᠨ ᠡᠭᠦᠳᠡ ᠵᠡᠭᠡᠯᠢ ᠭᠤᠳᠤᠮᠵᠢ	Баруун үүд зээл гудамж	150502002
Yongqing Subdistrict	永清街道	Yǒngqīng Jiēdào	ᠶᠦᠩ ᠴᠢᠩ ᠵᠡᠭᠡᠯᠢ ᠭᠤᠳᠤᠮᠵᠢ	Юн чин зээл гудамж	150502003
Mingren Subdistrict	明仁街道	Míngrén Jiēdào	ᠮᠢᠩ ᠷᠧᠨ ᠵᠡᠭᠡᠯᠢ ᠭᠤᠳᠤᠮᠵᠢ	Мин рен зээл гудамж	150502004
Shijie Subdistrict	施介街道	Shījiè Jiēdào	ᠱᠢ ᠵᠢᠶᠧ ᠵᠡᠭᠡᠯᠢ ᠭᠤᠳᠤᠮᠵᠢ	Ши жье зээл гудамж	150502005
Tuanjie Subdistrict	团结街道	Tuánjié Jiēdào	ᠪᠦᠯᠬᠦᠮᠳᠡᠯ ᠵᠡᠭᠡᠯᠢ ᠭᠤᠳᠤᠮᠵᠢ	Бүлгэмдэл зээл гудамж	150502006
Dongjiao Subdistrict	东郊街道	Dōngjiāo Jiēdào	ᠵᠡᠭᠦᠨ ᠲᠡᠭᠦᠷᠭᠡ ᠶᠢᠨ ᠵᠡᠭᠡᠯᠢ ᠭᠤᠳᠤᠮᠵᠢ	Зүүн дүүрээгийн зээл гудамж	150502007
Tielu Subdistrict	铁路街道	Tiělù Jiēdào	ᠲᠡᠮᠦᠷ ᠵᠠᠮ ᠤᠨ ᠵᠡᠭᠡᠯᠢ ᠭᠤᠳᠤᠮᠵᠢ	Дамар замын зээл гудамж	150502008
Hongxin Subdistrict	红星街道	Hóngxīng Jiēdào	ᠬᠤᠩ ᠰᠢᠩ ᠵᠡᠭᠡᠯᠢ ᠭᠤᠳᠤᠮᠵᠢ	Хон шин зээл гудамж	150502009
Holingol Subdistrict	霍林河街道	Huòlínhé Jiēdào	ᠬᠣᠣᠯᠢᠨ ᠭᠣᠣᠯ ᠵᠡᠭᠡᠯᠢ ᠭᠤᠳᠤᠮᠵᠢ	Хуулин гол зээл гудамж	150502010
Jianguo Subdistrict	建国街道	Jiànguó Jiēdào	ᠵᠢᠶᠠᠨ ᠭᠦᠸᠧ ᠵᠡᠭᠡᠯᠢ ᠭᠤᠳᠤᠮᠵᠢ	Жаан хве зээл гудамж	150502011
Towns
Dalin Town	大林镇	Dàlín Zhèn	ᠳᠠᠯᠠᠩ ᠪᠠᠯᠭᠠᠰᠤ	Дэлэн балгас	150502100
Qianjiadian Town	钱家店镇	Qiánjiādiàn Zhèn	ᠴᠢᠶᠠᠨ ᠵᠢᠶᠠ ᠳ᠋ᠢᠶᠠᠨ ᠪᠠᠯᠭᠠᠰᠤ	Чаан жье даяан балгас	150502101
Yuliangbao Town	余粮堡镇	Yúliángbǎo Zhèn	ᠢᠦᠢ ᠯᠢᠶᠠᠩ ᠪᠣᠦ᠋ ᠪᠠᠯᠭᠠᠰᠤ	Юй лан буу балгас	150502102
Melhit Town	木里图镇	Mùlǐtú Zhèn	ᠮᠡᠯᠡᠬᠡᠢᠲᠦ ᠪᠠᠯᠭᠠᠰᠤ	Мэлхийт балгас	150502103
Fengtian Town	丰田镇	Fēngtián Zhèn	ᠹᠧᠩ ᠲᠢᠶᠠᠨ ᠪᠠᠯᠭᠠᠰᠤ	Фен даяан балгас	150502104
Qinghe Town	清河镇	Qīnghé Zhèn	ᠴᠢᠩ ᠾᠧ ᠪᠠᠯᠭᠠᠰᠤ	Чин ге балгас	150502105
Yuxin Town	育新镇	Yùxīn Zhèn	ᠢᠦᠢ ᠰᠢᠨ ᠪᠠᠯᠭᠠᠰᠤ	Юй шин балгас	150502106
Qinghe Town	庆和镇	Qìnghé Zhèn	ᠴᠢᠩ ᠾᠧ ᠪᠠᠯᠭᠠᠰᠤ	Чин ге балгас	150502107
Sum
Murin Süm Sum (Moli Miao, Murin Miao)	莫力庙苏木	Mòlìmiào Sūmù	ᠮᠤᠷᠤᠢᠨ ᠰᠦᠮ᠎ᠡ ᠰᠤᠮᠤ	Муруйн сүм сум	150502200

- Others:
  - State-owned Zhenan Farm (国有哲南农场)
  - Sanyitang Farm (三义堂农场)
  - Tongliao Gaolintun Breeding Farm (通辽市高林屯种畜场)
  - Hurah Stock Breeding Farm (胡力海原种繁殖场)
  - Murin Miao Sheep Breeding Farm (莫力庙种羊场)
  - Banjiedian Pasture (半截店牧场)

== See also ==
- Khorchin Mongols
