= Tongliao =

Tongliao 通辽市 ᠲᠦᠩᠯᠢᠶᠣᠤ ᠬᠣᠲᠠ
- Prefecture-level city
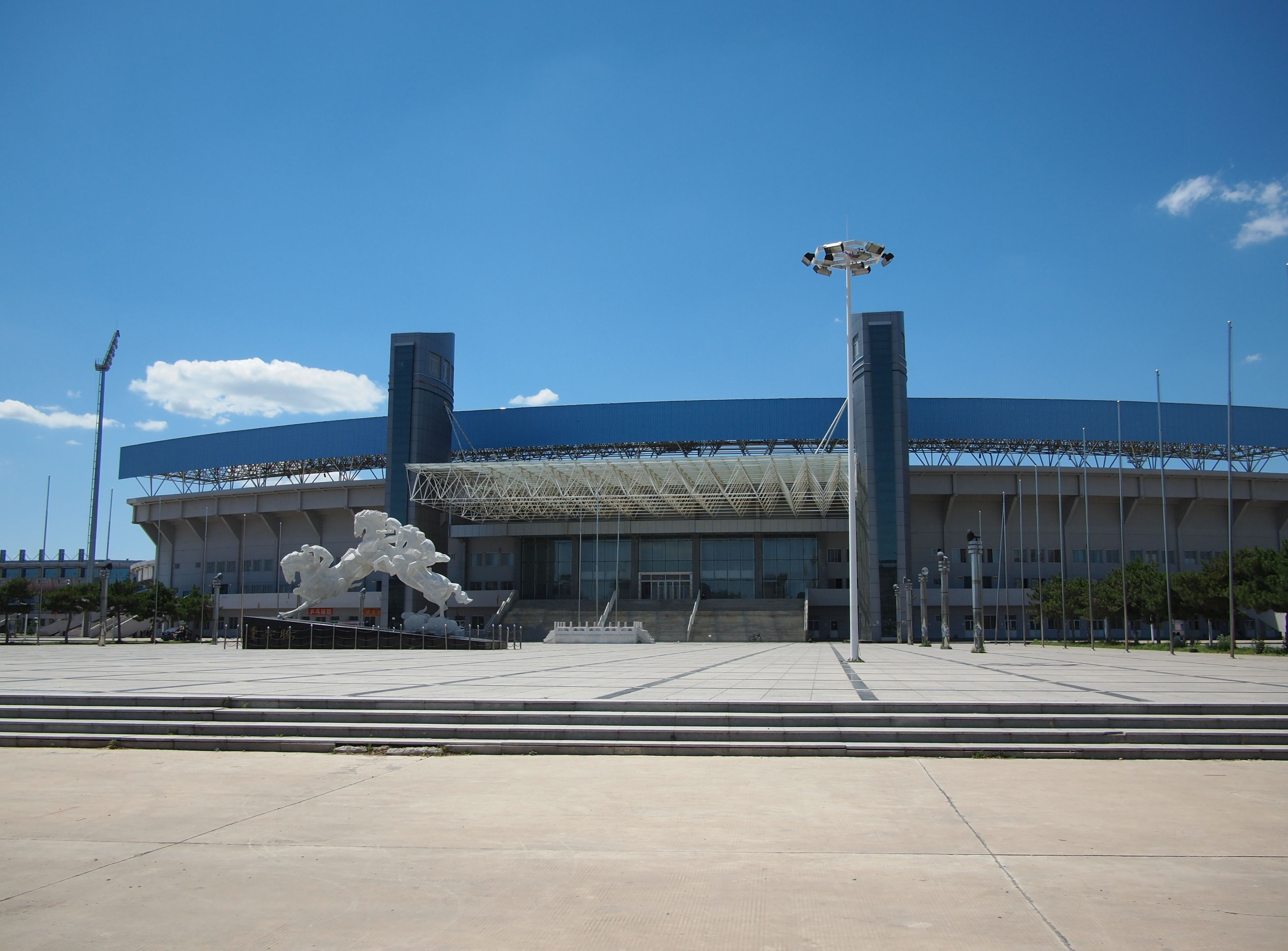
- Khorchin Stadium

- Location of Tongliao City jurisdiction in Inner Mongolia

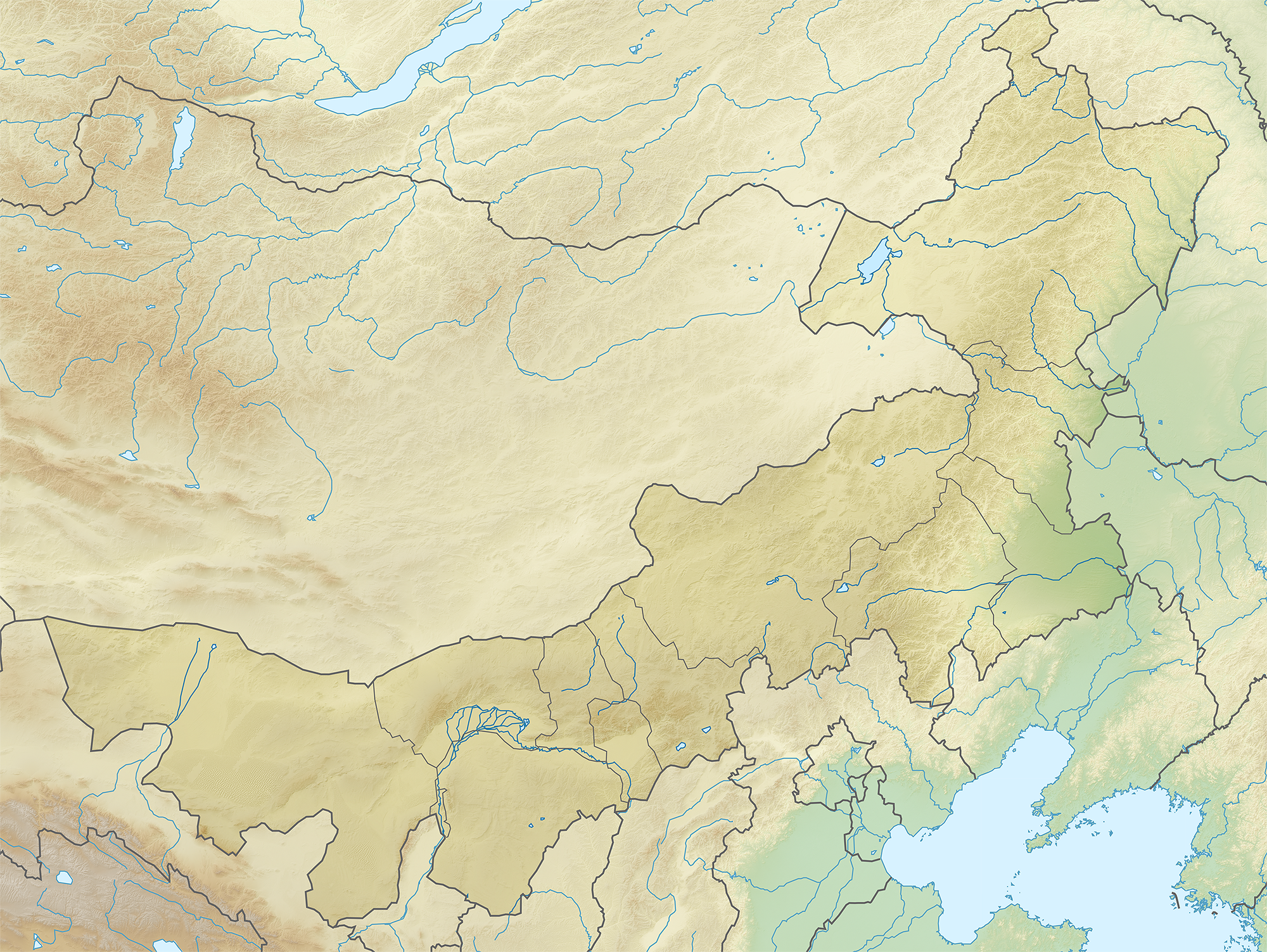
- Location of the city centre in Inner Mongolia
- Coordinates (Tongliao municipal government): 43°39′14″N 122°14′35″E
- Country: People's Republic of China
- Autonomous region: Inner Mongolia
- Municipal seat: Horqin District

Area
  - Prefecture-level city: 58,862 km^{2} (22,727 sq mi)
  - Metro: 3,516 km^{2} (1,358 sq mi)
- Elevation: 179 m (587 ft)
- Highest elevation: 1,444.2 m (4,738 ft)

Population (2020 census)
  - Prefecture-level city: 2,873,168
  - Density: 48.812/km^{2} (126.42/sq mi)
  - Urban: 1,437,489
  - Metro: 921,808
  - Metro density: 262.2/km^{2} (679.0/sq mi)

GDP
  - Prefecture-level city: CN¥ 187.7 billion US$ 30.1 billion
  - Per capita: CN¥ 60,128; US$ 9,654
- Time zone: UTC+8 (China Standard)
- ISO 3166 code: CN-NM-05
- Website: tongliao.gov.cn

Tongliao

Chinese name
- Simplified Chinese: 通辽
- Traditional Chinese: 通遼
- Literal meaning: "Through Liao"
Transcriptions
Standard Mandarin
- Hanyu Pinyin: Tōngliáo
- Bopomofo: ㄊㄨㄥ ㄌㄧㄠˊ
- Gwoyeu Romatzyh: Tongliau
- Wade–Giles: Tʻung^{1}-liao^{2}
- Yale Romanization: Tūnglyáu
- IPA: [tʰʊ́ŋ.ljǎʊ]

Mongolian name
- Mongolian Cyrillic: Тонляо хот
- Mongolian script: ᠲᠦᠩᠯᠢᠶᠣᠤ ᠬᠣᠲᠠ
Transcriptions
- SASM/GNC: Tüŋliyou qota

Tongliao (Note: Chinese: 通辽市; Mongolian: ᠲᠦᠩᠯᠢᠶᠣᠤ ᠬᠣᠲᠠ Tüŋliyou qota, Mongolian Cyrillic: Тонляо хот) is a prefecture-level city in eastern Inner Mongolia, People's Republic of China. The area is 59,535 square kilometres (22,987 sq mi) and as of the 2020 census, its population was 2,873,168 (3,139,153 in 2010). However, the city proper made of Horqin district, had 921,808 inhabitants. The city was the administrative centre of the defunct Jirem League. (Note: 哲里木盟; ᠵᠢᠷᠢᠮ ᠠᠢᠮᠠᠭ Jirim ayimaɣ)

The original Mongolian name for Tongliao city proper (i.e. Horqin District) is Bayitalai (Chinese: 白音泰赉/巴林太来; pinyin: Báiyīntàilài; lit. 'having buildings'), while the original name of the prefecture-level city is Jirem. The Mongolian dialect spoken in this area is Khorchin Mongolian.

== History ==
Human settlement in Tongliao and the surrounding Khorchin area dates from at least 1000 BC. The Donghu people, a tribe who spoke a proto-Mongolian language, settled in today's Tongliao area, north of Yan during the Warring States period. their culture was associated with the Upper Xiajiadian culture, characterized by the practice of agriculture and animal husbandry supplemented by handicrafts and bronze art. Later, the Tongliao area was controlled by Xiongnu, Xianbei, and Khitan tribes.

After the Mongolian Khanate occupied the area, Tongliao was put under the jurisdiction of Liaoyang province, whose provincial capital was in today's Liaoning Province. In early 1617, Khorchin, Dörbod, Jalaid and Gorlos tribes met in Jirem to establish an alliance, and the Jirem League was founded in 1636 to administer Khorchin territory. The Jirem League had jurisdiction over six Khorchin banners, two Gorlos banners, one Dorbod banner and one Jalaid banner. During the Republican period, the Jirem League and the surrounding Khorchin area was controlled by the Fengtian and Liaoning provinces.

In 1918, Tongliao County was first established under the administration of the Jirem League and Fengtian province. After the Japanese invaded northern China in 1931, the Japanese attacked Tongliao urban area and soon divided it into four parts, in order to govern the western part of former Heilongjiang, Jilin and Fengtian provinces. These Xing'an provinces roughly overlap today's eastern part of Inner Mongolia, including today's Hulunbuir League, Xingan League, Chifeng and Tongliao. After the dissolution of the Manchukuo state, the Jirem League was governed by Liaoning and Liaobei provinces until Ulanhu established Inner Mongolia in Ulanhot, governing eastern Mongolian areas including the Hulunbuir, Jirem and Ju Ud leagues. After 1969, the Jirem League was put under the administration of Jilin province administration for 10 years until 1979. In 1999, the Jirem League became defunct and changed its name to Tongliao city, which was set up a prefecture-level city.

In 1924, Oomoto leader Onisaburo Deguchi, Aikido founder Morihei Ueshiba, and Lu Zhankui were arrested by Chinese authorities in Tongliao. Lu and his men were executed by firing squad, but Deguchi and Ueshiba were released into the customer of the Japanese consul.

== Geography and climate ==
Tongliao spans latitude 42°15' – 45°41' and longitude 119°15' – 123°43', and borders Jilin province to the east, Liaoning to the south, Chifeng to the southwest, the Xilin Gol League to the west, and the Hinggan League to the north. Not far from Tongliao are silica sands. Tongliao has a total area of 59,535 square kilometres (22,987 sq mi), accounting for 5.4% of Inner Mongolia's total.

Tongliao's topography primarily consists of plains, though the northern stretch of the prefecture extends into the eastern foothills of the southern Greater Khingan. The central and eastern parts of the prefecture are marked by the plains of the Xiliao, Xinkai River (新开河), and Jiaolai rivers (教来河), collectively forming the Sanhe Plain (三河平原; 'three rivers' plain'). The highest point in the prefecture is Tunte'er Peak (吞特尔峰), at 1,444.2 m (4,738 ft).

Tongliao has a four-season, monsoon-influenced, continental steppe climate (Köppen BSk), with long, cold, windy, but dry winters, and hot, humid summers. Monthly mean temperatures range from −13.0 °C (8.6 °F) in January to 24.2 °C (75.6 °F) in July, with an annual mean of 7.11 °C (44.8 °F). Much of the year's rainfall occurs from June to August, and even then dry and sunny weather dominates in the city. With monthly percent possible sunshine ranging from 57% in July to 78% in January, sunshine is abundant year-round, with 3,054 hours of bright sunshine annually.

Climate data for Tongliao, elevation 179 m (587 ft), (1991–2020 normals, extremes 1936–present)
Month	Jan	Feb	Mar	Apr	May	Jun	Jul	Aug	Sep	Oct	Nov	Dec	Year
Record high °C (°F)	9.7 (49.5)	19.0 (66.2)	25.7 (78.3)	35.5 (95.9)	41.5 (106.7)	39.7 (103.5)	38.7 (101.7)	38.5 (101.3)	33.5 (92.3)	30.2 (86.4)	21.1 (70.0)	14.6 (58.3)	41.5 (106.7)
Mean daily maximum °C (°F)	−6.4 (20.5)	−1.0 (30.2)	6.8 (44.2)	16.4 (61.5)	23.8 (74.8)	28.2 (82.8)	29.9 (85.8)	28.6 (83.5)	24.0 (75.2)	15.2 (59.4)	3.7 (38.7)	−4.8 (23.4)	13.7 (56.7)
Daily mean °C (°F)	−12.5 (9.5)	−7.6 (18.3)	0.2 (32.4)	9.8 (49.6)	17.4 (63.3)	22.3 (72.1)	24.7 (76.5)	23.1 (73.6)	17.2 (63.0)	8.5 (47.3)	−2.2 (28.0)	−10.5 (13.1)	7.5 (45.6)
Mean daily minimum °C (°F)	−17.4 (0.7)	−13.2 (8.2)	−5.7 (21.7)	3.4 (38.1)	11.0 (51.8)	16.5 (61.7)	19.9 (67.8)	18.1 (64.6)	11.2 (52.2)	2.8 (37.0)	−7.0 (19.4)	−15.1 (4.8)	2.0 (35.7)
Record low °C (°F)	−33.9 (−29.0)	−28.7 (−19.7)	−22.8 (−9.0)	−13.9 (7.0)	−2.2 (28.0)	3.5 (38.3)	10.8 (51.4)	5.9 (42.6)	−2.2 (28.0)	−11.2 (11.8)	−23.0 (−9.4)	−31.6 (−24.9)	−33.9 (−29.0)
Average precipitation mm (inches)	1.4 (0.06)	1.6 (0.06)	6.3 (0.25)	15.2 (0.60)	37.0 (1.46)	75.3 (2.96)	101.7 (4.00)	91.7 (3.61)	23.8 (0.94)	18.5 (0.73)	7.3 (0.29)	2.2 (0.09)	382 (15.05)
Average precipitation days (≥ 0.1 mm)	1.8	1.5	2.8	4.4	7.3	10.8	10.9	9.0	6.0	3.6	2.5	2.7	63.3
Average snowy days	3.3	2.7	3.7	1.5	0.1	0.1	0	0	0	0.9	3.4	4.5	20.2
Average relative humidity (%)	52	43	39	39	45	59	71	71	60	53	51	54	53
Mean monthly sunshine hours	219.5	228.6	269.8	265.0	279.2	259.4	240.9	251.2	256.6	240.9	201.6	198.8	2,911.5
Percentage possible sunshine	76	77	73	65	61	56	52	59	69	72	70	72	67
Source 1: China Meteorological Administration
Source 2: Weather China

== Subdivisions ==
Map
Name	Mongolian	Hanzi	Hanyu Pinyin	Population (2020)	Area (km^{2})	Density (/km^{2})
Horqin District	ᠬᠣᠷᠴᠢᠨ ᠲᠣᠭᠣᠷᠢᠭ (Qorčin toɣoriɣ)	科尔沁区	Kē'ěrqìn Qū	921,808	3,515.69	262
Holingol city	ᠬᠤᠤᠯᠢᠩᠭᠤᠤᠯ ᠬᠣᠲᠠ (Qoolin Ɣool qota)	霍林郭勒市	Huòlínguōlè Shì	138,676	584.65	237
Kailu County	ᠺᠠᠶᠢᠯᠦ ᠰᠢᠶᠠᠨ (Ḵayilü siyan)	开鲁县	Kāilǔ Xiàn	313,364	4,353.20	72
Hure Banner	ᠬᠦᠷᠢᠶ᠎ᠡ ᠬᠣᠰᠢᠭᠤ (Küriy-e qosiɣu)	库伦旗	Kùlún Qí	151,133	4,709	32
Naiman Banner	ᠨᠠᠢᠮᠠᠨ ᠬᠣᠰᠢᠭᠤ (Naiman qosiɣu)	奈曼旗	Nàimàn Qí	375,312	8,135.22	46
Jarud Banner	ᠵᠠᠷᠤᠳ ᠬᠣᠰᠢᠭᠤ (Jarud qosiɣu)	扎鲁特旗	Zālǔtè Qí	251,806	16,491.6	15
Horqin Left Middle Banner (Horqin Jun Garun Dundad Banner)	ᠬᠣᠷᠴᠢᠨ ᠵᠡᠭᠦᠨ ᠭᠠᠷᠤᠨ ᠳᠤᠮᠳᠠᠳᠤ ᠬᠣᠰᠢᠭᠤ (Qorčin Jegün Ɣarun Dumdadu qosiɣu)	科尔沁左翼中旗	Kē'ěrqìn Zuǒyì; Zhōng Qí	399,631	9,572.54	42
Horqin Left Back Banner (Horqin Jun Garun Hoit Banner)	ᠬᠣᠷᠴᠢᠨ ᠵᠡᠭᠦᠨ ᠭᠠᠷᠤᠨ ᠬᠣᠶᠢᠲᠤ ᠬᠣᠰᠢᠭᠤ (Qorčin Jegün Ɣarun Qoyitu qosiɣu)	科尔沁左翼后旗	Kē'ěrqìn Zuǒyì; Hòu Qí	321,438	11,499.64	28

== Demographics ==
Ethnic groups in Tongliao, 2010 census.

Ethnicity	Population	Percentage
Han	1,592,279	50.72%
Mongol	1,441,275	45.91%
Manchu	88,316	2.81%
Hui	12,462	0.4%
Korean	2,421	0.08%
Xibe	890	0.03%
Daur	548	0.02%

== Transport ==
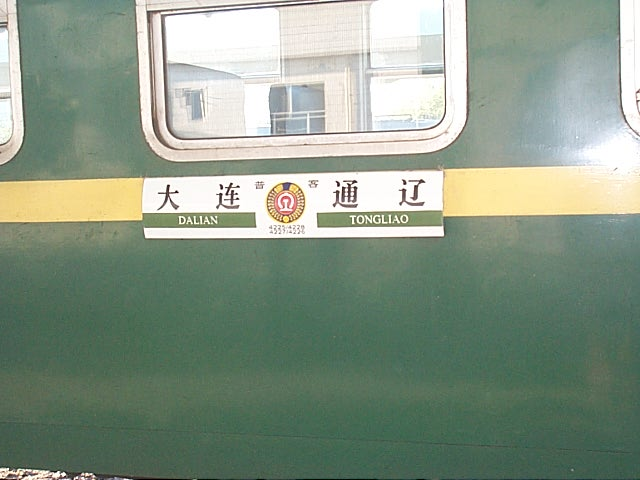
Local train from Dalian to Tongliao (2002)

Tongliao railway station is a railway hub in both Inner Mongolia and Northeast China. Tongliao-Beijing Railway conveniently connects the city with Beijing. Jining–Tongliao railway connects Inner Mongolia. There are also railways connecting Tongliao with Shenyang and Daqing. State Highway 111, State Highway 303, State Highway 304 and State Highway 204 run through the city and extend to harbor cities such as Tianjin, Dalian, and Qinhuangdao. The city is served by Tongliao Airport.

== Education ==
The Inner Mongolia University for Nationalities (内蒙古民族大学) and Inner Mongolia College of Farming and Animal Husbandry (merged into the Inner Mongolia University for Nationalities) are among the educational institutions of Tongliao.

Additionally Tongliao Mongolian Middle School (通辽蒙古族中学) is there.

== Points of interest ==
- Zhurihe Ranch (珠日河牧場)
- Daqinggou (大青溝)

Every summer, the Naadam festival is held at Tongliao's Zhurihe Ranch.

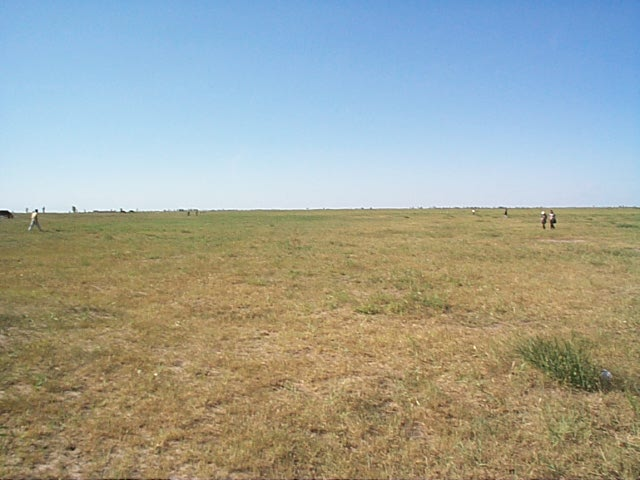
Zhurihe Grassland (Zhurihe Ranch)

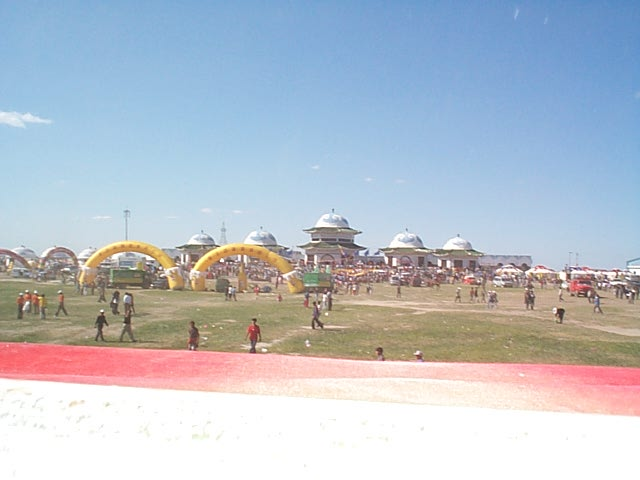
Zhurihe Ranch in a festive mood of Naadam

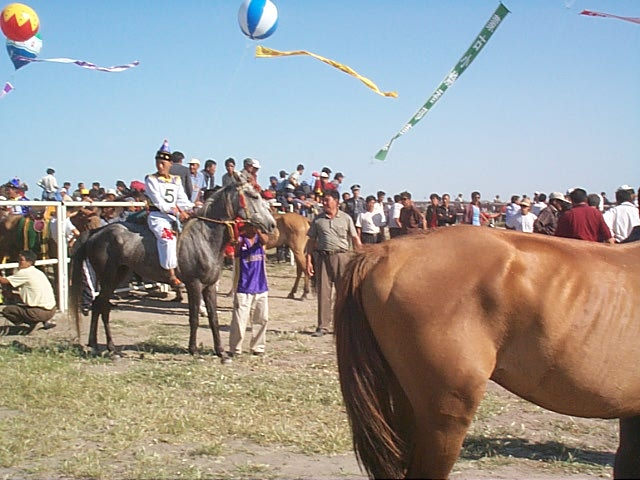
Before the Horse race

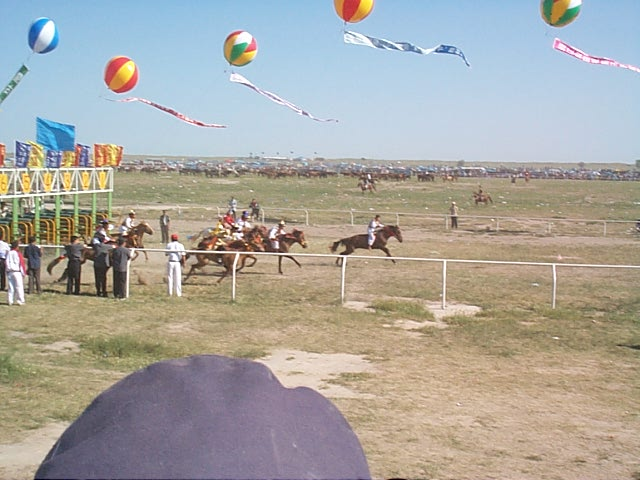
Start of the horse race

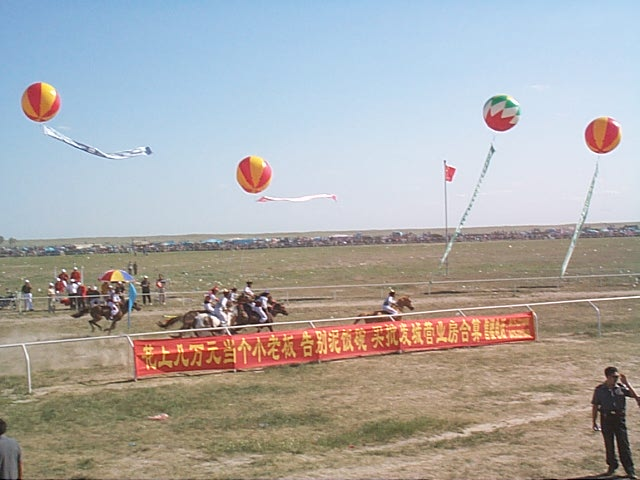
Running of the horses

== Notable people ==
- Gada Meiren
- Guo Shuang
