= Faku County =

Faku 法库县
- County
- Location in Liaoning
- Coordinates: 42°29′42″N 123°24′40″E
- Country: People's Republic of China
- Province: Liaoning
- Sub-provincial city: Shenyang

Area
  - Total: 2,285 km^{2} (882 sq mi)

Population (2020)
  - Total: 340,933
  - Density: 149.2/km^{2} (386.4/sq mi)
- Time zone: UTC+8 (China Standard)
- Postal code: 1104XX

Faku County (simplified Chinese: 法库县; traditional Chinese: 法庫縣; pinyin: Fǎkù Xiàn) is a county of Liaoning Province, Northeast China. It is under the administration of the prefecture-level city of Shenyang, the capital of Liaoning, 77 km (48 mi) north of downtown Shenyang. As of 2020, it has a population of 340,933 in an area of 2,285 km^{2} (882 sq mi). It lies on China National Highway 203. It borders Kangping County to the north, Shenbei New Area to the southeast, and Xinmin City to the southwest as well as the prefecture-level cities of Tieling to the east and Fuxin to the west.

== Administrative divisions ==
There are eight towns, 11 townships, and one ethnic township within the county.

Towns:

- Faku (法库镇)
- Yemaotao (叶茂台镇)
- Xiushuihezi (秀水河子镇)
- Dengshibaozi (登士堡子镇)
- Baijiagou (柏家沟镇)
- Dagujiazi (大孤家子镇)
- Sanmianchuan (三面船镇)
- Dingjiafang (丁家房镇)

Townships:

- Fengbeibao Township (冯贝堡乡)
- Ci'ensi Township (慈恩寺乡)
- Shuangtaizi Township (双台子乡)
- Woniushi Township (卧牛石乡)
- Heping Township (和平乡)
- Wutaizi Township (五台子乡)
- Shijianfang Township (十间房乡)
- Yiniubaozi Township (依牛堡子乡)
- Baojiatun Township (包家屯乡)
- Mengjia Township (孟家乡)
- Hongwuyue Township (红五月乡)
- Sijiazi Mongol Ethnic Township (四家子蒙古族乡)

== Climate ==
Climate data for Faku, elevation 98 m (322 ft), (1991–2020 normals, extremes 1981–2010)
Month	Jan	Feb	Mar	Apr	May	Jun	Jul	Aug	Sep	Oct	Nov	Dec	Year
Record high °C (°F)	6.8 (44.2)	17.1 (62.8)	20.7 (69.3)	30.1 (86.2)	34.6 (94.3)	37.2 (99.0)	37.5 (99.5)	35.0 (95.0)	32.0 (89.6)	28.4 (83.1)	20.1 (68.2)	12.3 (54.1)	37.5 (99.5)
Mean daily maximum °C (°F)	−6.0 (21.2)	−0.9 (30.4)	6.7 (44.1)	16.4 (61.5)	23.5 (74.3)	27.2 (81.0)	28.8 (83.8)	27.9 (82.2)	23.7 (74.7)	15.5 (59.9)	4.5 (40.1)	−3.9 (25.0)	13.6 (56.5)
Daily mean °C (°F)	−12.2 (10.0)	−7.2 (19.0)	0.7 (33.3)	10.0 (50.0)	17.2 (63.0)	21.8 (71.2)	24.3 (75.7)	23.0 (73.4)	17.3 (63.1)	9.2 (48.6)	−0.9 (30.4)	−9.6 (14.7)	7.8 (46.0)
Mean daily minimum °C (°F)	−17.6 (0.3)	−12.8 (9.0)	−4.7 (23.5)	3.8 (38.8)	11.3 (52.3)	16.8 (62.2)	20.3 (68.5)	18.8 (65.8)	11.6 (52.9)	3.5 (38.3)	−5.7 (21.7)	−14.7 (5.5)	2.6 (36.6)
Record low °C (°F)	−34.4 (−29.9)	−31.0 (−23.8)	−21.3 (−6.3)	−9.3 (15.3)	−1.1 (30.0)	2.1 (35.8)	10.7 (51.3)	6.9 (44.4)	−0.7 (30.7)	−12.4 (9.7)	−23.4 (−10.1)	−30.3 (−22.5)	−34.4 (−29.9)
Average precipitation mm (inches)	3.1 (0.12)	6.0 (0.24)	12.1 (0.48)	27.2 (1.07)	55.6 (2.19)	92.1 (3.63)	149.7 (5.89)	143.7 (5.66)	42.3 (1.67)	32.7 (1.29)	16.3 (0.64)	5.5 (0.22)	586.3 (23.1)
Average precipitation days (≥ 0.1 mm)	2.7	2.6	3.8	6.2	9.0	11.5	11.2	10.6	6.9	5.9	4.5	3.5	78.4
Average snowy days	4.3	3.9	4.2	1.6	0	0	0	0	0	0.8	4.3	5.2	24.3
Average relative humidity (%)	60	52	48	47	52	66	78	80	70	61	61	62	61
Mean monthly sunshine hours	179.7	191.5	230.2	230.4	252.7	224.8	196.6	208.0	225.9	206.9	163.4	156.1	2,466.2
Percentage possible sunshine	61	64	62	57	56	49	43	49	61	61	56	56	56
Source: China Meteorological Administration
