= Xinmin, Liaoning =

Xinmin 新民市
- County-level city
- Location in Liaoning
- Coordinates: 41°59′49″N 122°49′23″E
- Country: People's Republic of China
- Province: Liaoning
- Sub-provincial city: Shenyang

Area
  - County-level city: 3,318.0 km^{2} (1,281.1 sq mi)

Population (2020)
  - County-level city: 565,634
  - Density: 170.47/km^{2} (441.53/sq mi)
  - Urban (2020): 218,041
- Time zone: UTC+8 (China Standard)
- Postal code: 1103XX

The city of Xinmin (Chinese: 新民; pinyin: Xīnmín; Wade–Giles: Hsin-min) is a county-level city of Liaoning Province, Northeast China, under the administration of the prefecture-level city of Shenyang. It contains the westernmost point of and is by far the most spacious of the county-level divisions of Shenyang City. Xinmin borders Faku County to the northeast, Shenbei New Area and Yuhong District to the east, Tiexi District to the southeast, and Liaozhong County to the south; it also borders the prefecture-level cities of Jinzhou to the west and Fuxin to the northwest.

== Administrative divisions ==
The city administration of Xinmin covers five subdistricts, 11 towns, and 13 townships.

Subdistricts:

- Dongcheng Subdistrict (东城街道), Xicheng Subdistrict (西城街道), Liaobin Subdistrict (辽滨街道), Xinliu Subdistrict (新柳街道), Xincheng Subdistrict (新城街道)

Towns:

- Dahongqi (大红旗镇), Liangshan (梁山镇), Daliutun (大柳屯镇), Gongzhutun (公主屯镇), Xinglong (兴隆镇), Xinglongbao (兴隆堡镇), Hutai (胡台镇), Fahaniu (法哈牛镇), Qiandangbao (前当堡镇), Damintun (大民屯镇), Liuhegou (柳河沟镇)

Townships:

- Gaotaizi Township (高台子乡), Jinwutaizi Township (金五台子乡), Hongqi Township (红旗乡), Lutun Township (卢屯乡), Yaobao Township (姚堡乡), Zhoutuozi Township (周坨子乡), Yujiawobao Township (于家窝堡乡), Xinnongcun Township (新农村乡), Dongsheshanzi Township (东蛇山子乡), Taotun Township (陶屯乡), Luojiafangzi Township (罗家房子乡), Sandaogangzi Township (三道岗子乡), Zhangjiatun Township (张家屯乡)

== Climate ==
Climate data for Xinmin, elevation 31 m (102 ft), (1991–2020 normals, extremes 1981–2025)
Month	Jan	Feb	Mar	Apr	May	Jun	Jul	Aug	Sep	Oct	Nov	Dec	Year
Record high °C (°F)	7.0 (44.6)	16.6 (61.9)	23.9 (75.0)	29.8 (85.6)	33.6 (92.5)	37.5 (99.5)	35.3 (95.5)	35.8 (96.4)	33.0 (91.4)	28.5 (83.3)	20.4 (68.7)	12.2 (54.0)	37.5 (99.5)
Mean daily maximum °C (°F)	−4.6 (23.7)	0.3 (32.5)	7.6 (45.7)	17.0 (62.6)	24.0 (75.2)	27.5 (81.5)	29.3 (84.7)	28.7 (83.7)	24.6 (76.3)	16.5 (61.7)	5.6 (42.1)	−2.5 (27.5)	14.5 (58.1)
Daily mean °C (°F)	−10.6 (12.9)	−5.7 (21.7)	1.7 (35.1)	10.7 (51.3)	17.8 (64.0)	22.2 (72.0)	24.8 (76.6)	23.7 (74.7)	18.1 (64.6)	10.0 (50.0)	0.2 (32.4)	−8.0 (17.6)	8.7 (47.7)
Mean daily minimum °C (°F)	−15.4 (4.3)	−10.8 (12.6)	−3.4 (25.9)	4.8 (40.6)	11.9 (53.4)	17.4 (63.3)	20.9 (69.6)	19.6 (67.3)	12.7 (54.9)	4.6 (40.3)	−4.4 (24.1)	−12.7 (9.1)	3.8 (38.8)
Record low °C (°F)	−30.0 (−22.0)	−26.5 (−15.7)	−16.9 (1.6)	−7.5 (18.5)	1.5 (34.7)	5.7 (42.3)	13.7 (56.7)	7.6 (45.7)	0.1 (32.2)	−8.5 (16.7)	−19.52 (−3.14)	−28.2 (−18.8)	−30.0 (−22.0)
Average precipitation mm (inches)	2.9 (0.11)	5.6 (0.22)	12.2 (0.48)	28.9 (1.14)	53.7 (2.11)	81.4 (3.20)	152.2 (5.99)	141.4 (5.57)	52.9 (2.08)	33.4 (1.31)	16.2 (0.64)	5.7 (0.22)	586.5 (23.07)
Average precipitation days (≥ 0.1 mm)	2.1	2.3	3.9	5.8	8.4	10.9	11.3	9.8	6.3	5.6	4.2	3.0	73.6
Average snowy days	3.9	3.6	3.8	1.1	0	0	0	0	0	0.6	3.3	4.0	20.3
Average relative humidity (%)	57	51	49	48	54	68	79	80	71	63	60	60	62
Mean monthly sunshine hours	188.5	197.2	236.2	237.7	262.1	235.3	206.4	218.5	235.7	217.3	173.0	170.4	2,578.3
Percentage possible sunshine	64	66	63	59	58	52	45	51	64	64	59	60	59
Source: China Meteorological Administration
