= Tencent Maps =

Chinese desktop and web mapping service application

Tencent Maps 腾讯地图
- Tencent map showing details for China while neighboring Japan and Korea are blank
- Website type: Web mapping
- Available in: Simplified Chinese
- Owner: Tencent
- Website: map.qq.com
- Commercial: Yes
- Launched: 2011; 15 years ago
- Current status: Active

Tencent Maps is a desktop and web mapping service application and technology provided by Tencent, offering satellite imagery, street maps, street view and historical view perspectives, as well as functions such as a route planner for traveling by foot, car, or with public transportation. Android and iOS versions are available.

The online version of Tencent Map is available only in the Chinese language and offers maps only of mainland China, Hong Kong, Macau, and Taiwan, with the rest of the world appearing unexplored.

On September 26, 2014, Tencent Map announced that maps of Japan, South Korea, Thailand and Taiwan were launched for the mobile version. These locations (except Taiwan) are not available on the web version as of July 2017.

Tencent Maps partners with NavInfo for the Chinese market and MapKing for the Hong Kong market.

== Street view service ==
The street view service of Tencent Maps was first launched in 2011, but later stopped because of restrictions on geographic data in China. It was relaunched on December 13, 2012.

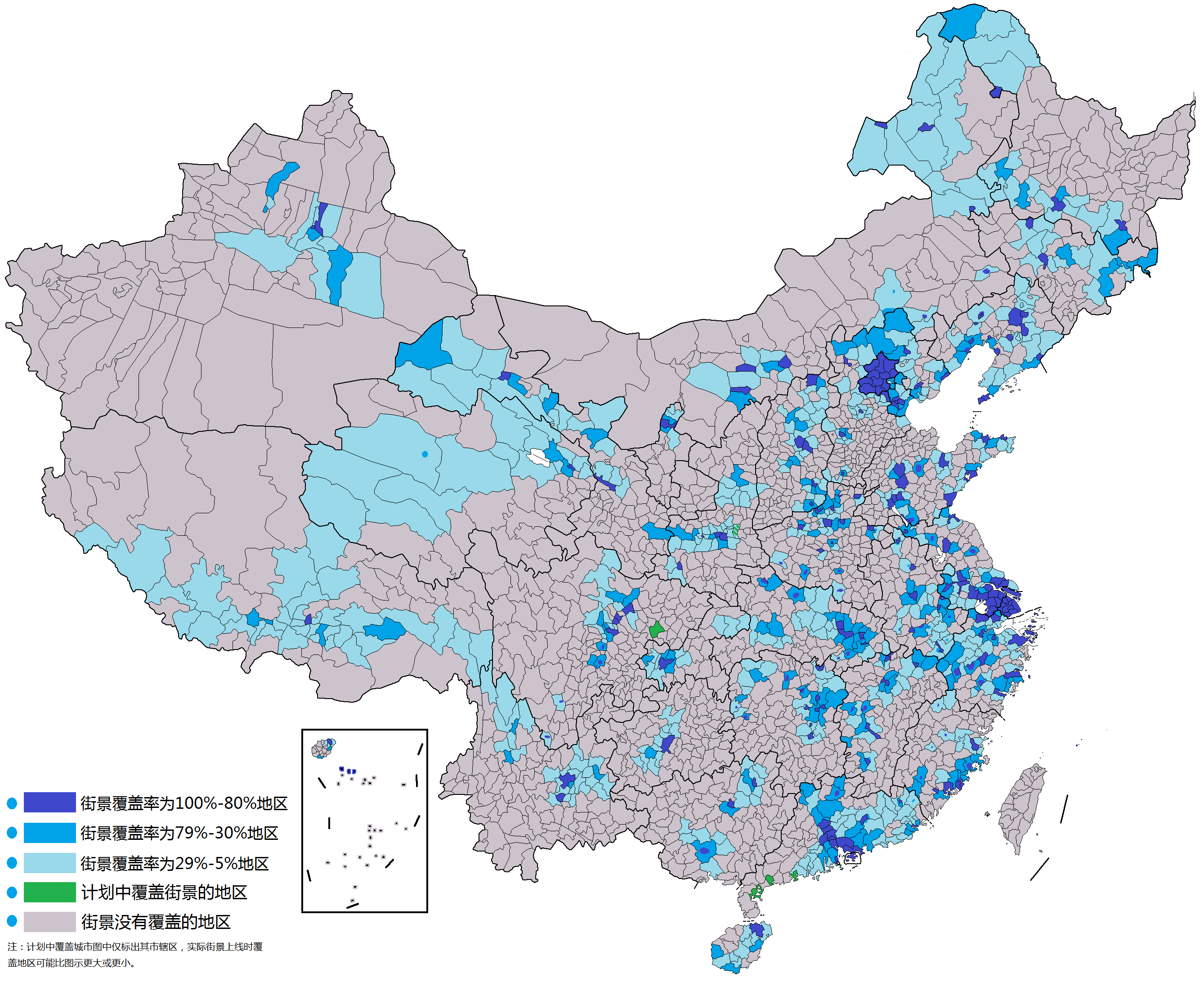
As of 2015, places with: 80%-100% coverage 30%-79% coverage 5%-29% coverage planned coverage no current coverage

=== Timeline of introductions ===
# (Note: Releases without number don't have official announcement.)	Release date	Major locations added
1	December 13, 2012	Beijing; Shanghai; Guangdong: Guangzhou, Shenzhen; Shaanxi: Xi'an; Tibet Autonomous Region: Lhasa (prefecture-level city)
2	March 20, 2013	Yunnan: Dali Bai Autonomous Prefecture, Lijiang, Dêqên Tibetan Autonomous Prefecture; Tibet Autonomous Region: Chamdo, Lhoka (Shannan) Prefecture, Nyingchi, Shigatse; Hebei: Chengde, Zhangjiakou; Jiangxi: Shangrao: Wuyuan County, Jiangxi: Hainan: Sanya
3	April 1, 2013	Beijing: More areas
4	April 12, 2013	Xinjiang: Karamay
5	April 24, 2013	Hubei: Wuhan; Sichuan: Chengdu; Jiangsu: Nanjing; Yunnan: Kunming; Hainan: Haikou; Announced together with aerial photographs of Senkaku Islands (aka Diaoyu Islands or Pinnacle Islands)
6	May 29, 2013	Zhejiang: Hangzhou; Jiangsu: Suzhou, Wuxi; Fujian: Fuzhou, Xiamen; Hunan: Changsha; Guangdong: Zhuhai, Zhongshan, Dongguan, Foshan
7	July 11, 2013	Shanghai: More areas Guangdong: Guangzhou: More areas Chongqing; Zhejiang: Ningbo; Guangdong: Jiangmen, Huizhou, Shantou; Henan: Zhengzhou
8	August 8, 2013	Tianjin; Jiangxi: Nanchang; Hebei: Shijiazhuang; Shanxi: Taiyuan; Guangxi: Nanning
9	August 23, 2013	Liaoning: Shenyang
10	August 26, 2013	Shandong: Jinan, Qingdao; Inner Mongolia: Hohhot
11	September 15, 2013	Shandong: Weifang
12	October 21, 2013	Shaanxi: Xi'an: More areas Anhui: Hefei; Xinjiang: Ürümqi; Heilongjiang: Harbin; Jilin: Changchun; Liaoning: Dalian
13	October 29, 2013	Heilongjiang: Mudanjiang, Daqing, Qiqihar, Da Hinggan Ling Prefecture; Henan: Luoyang; Jilin: Songyuan, Jilin City, Yanbian Korean Autonomous Prefecture: Antu County; Liaoning: Dandong, Benxi, Anshan, Fushun, Jinzhou; Inner Mongolia: Ordos City, Hulunbuir, Baotou; Guangxi: Liuzhou; Yunnan: Qujing, Yuxi
14	November 11, 2013	Guizhou: Anshun
==	November 27, 2013	Guangdong: Shenzhen (More areas: Shenzhen Bao'an International Airport Terminal 3 and Ground Transportation Center)
15	December 12, 2013	Ningxia: Yinchuan; Jilin: Yanbian Korean Autonomous Prefecture; Inner Mongolia: Hinggan League; Hebei: Qinhuangdao, Tangshan, Langfang, Baoding, Handan, Chengde; Shaanxi: Baoji, Xianyang, Hanzhong; Shandong: Yantai, Weihai, Tai'an, Rizhao; Henan: Kaifeng, Xuchang; Qinghai: Xining, Haibei Tibetan Autonomous Prefecture; Gansu: Lanzhou, Jiayuguan City, Jiuquan, Zhangye, Wuwei, Gansu, Tianshui; Guizhou: Guiyang; Guangxi: Guilin; Hainan: Sansha, Dongfang, Hainan
16	January 15, 2014	Xinjiang: Turpan; Jiangsu: Xuzhou; Shandong: Jining; Sichuan: Deyang; Henan: Xinxiang, Jiaozuo; Shanxi: Xinzhou, Datong; Jiangxi: Jiujiang, Jingdezhen, Ji'an; Shaanxi: Yan'an; Zhejiang: Wenzhou, Jiaxing; Hunan: Xiangtan; Yunnan: More areas: China National Highway 214, China National Highway 320 and Provincial road 221 of Yunnan, etc. Tibet Autonomous Region: Nagqu Prefecture, Mêdog County and China National Highway 318, China National Highway 109, etc. Beijing: More areas Shanghai: More areas Guangdong: Guangzhou: More areas, Shenzhen: More areas
17	February 26, 2014	Beijing: More areas Shanghai: More areas Zhejiang: Hangzhou: More areas Guangdong: Guangzhou, Shenzhen: More areas Hubei: Wuhan: More areas Jiangsu: Nanjing: More areas, Yangzhou; Hunan: Zhangjiajie, Zhuzhou; Zhejiang: Taizhou, Zhejiang, Shaoxing; Sichuan: Chengdu: More areas, Mianyang; Shanxi: Changzhi, Jinzhong
18	April 17, 2014	Hong Kong
==	April 25, 2014	Qinghai: Golmud and China National Highway 319 (Golmud section)
==	May 14, 2014	Hubei: water views of Yangtze in Yichang and Enshi Tujia and Miao Autonomous Prefecture; Chongqing: water views of Yangtze; Guangdong: Guangzhou, Shenzhen: More areas
19	May 29, 2014	Beijing: More areas Shanghai: More areas Hong Kong: More areas in New Territories, Kowloon and Hong Kong Island; Guangdong: Shaoguan; Zhejiang: Zhoushan; Hunan: Xiangxi Tujia and Miao Autonomous Prefecture; Sichuan: Ngawa Tibetan and Qiang Autonomous Prefecture; Hubei: Yichang, Huanggang
==	June 11, 2014	Hong Kong: Hong Kong–Shenzhen Western Corridor
20	June 26, 2014	Beijing: More areas Shanghai: More areas Guangdong: Guangzhou, Shenzhen, Foshan: More areas Hong Kong: More areas in New Territories, Kowloon and Hong Kong Island; Jiangxi: Ganzhou; Jiangsu: Lianyungang; Hunan: Hengyang; Hubei: Xiangyang, Shiyan, Ezhou; Shanxi: Jincheng
21	August 1, 2014	Beijing: More areas Shanghai: More areas Hong Kong: More areas in Tsim Sha Tsui and Sai Kung Town; Guangdong: More areas in Guangzhou and Shenzhen, Qingyuan; Jiangsu: Suzhou: More areas in Changshu and Zhangjiagang, Nantong, Zhenjiang; Zhejiang: Jinhua, Lishui, Quzhou, Huzhou; Anhui: Wuhu; Hainan: More areas in Haikou and Sanya, China National Highway 224 (Sanya–Tunchang County), Provincial road 314 of Hainan (Sanya–Ledong); Fujian: Quanzhou, Putian; Hunan: More areas in Changsha (including Liuyang), Yueyang; Hubei: Xiaogan, Huangshi; Jiangxi: Xinyu
22	August 28, 2014	Beijing: More areas Shanghai: More areas Hong Kong: More areas Chongqing: More areas (including water views of Yangtze in Fuling District and Changshou Lake); Jiangsu: Suzhou: More areas (urban area, Wujiang District, Suzhou, Taicang, Zhouzhuang); Guangdong: Guangzhou: More areas, Shenzhen: More areas Liaoning: Shenyang: More areas Sichuan: Leshan (Leshan Giant Buddha and Emeishan City); Hubei: Wuhan: More areas Yunnan: Kunming: More areas Fujian: More areas in Fuzhou (including Fuqing) and Xiamen; Zhejiang: Hangzhou: More areas, Ningbo: More areas
23	September 11, 2014	Guangdong: Meizhou; G15 Shenyang–Haikou Expressway (Chaoyang District, Shantou–Huidong County, Guangdong); S17 Chaozhou–Huilai Expressway (Jieyang section); G78 Shantou–Kunming Expressway (Shantou–Xingning, Guangdong); G25 Changchun–Shenzhen Expressway (Meixian District–Huidong)
==	September 25, 2014	Beijing: More areas Shanghai: More areas Chongqing: More areas (urban area); Guangdong: Guangzhou: More areas；Shenzhen: More areas (urban area, Shenzhen Universiade Sports Centre, urban area of Longgang District, Shenzhen, Longhua Subdistrict, Shenzhen, G4 Beijing–Hong Kong and Macau Expressway (Huanggang–Fuyong), Renhua–Shenzhen Expressway (Shenzhen–Huiyang); Jiangsu: Suzhou: More areas Hebei: Zhangjiakou: More areas (urban area); Liaoning: G1 Beijing–Harbin Expressway (Shenyang–border of Liaoning); Jilin: G1 Beijing–Harbin Expressway (Siping, Jilin section); Hubei: G42 Shanghai–Chengdu Expressway (Wuhan–Jingmen); Tibet Autonomous Region: China National Highway 219 (Ngari Prefecture–Shigatse)
==	October 24, 2014	Guangdong: Heyuan: More areas
==	October 30, 2014	Beijing: More areas Shanghai: More areas Guangdong: Guangzhou, Shenzhen: More areas (Pingshan Railway Station, Longgang District, Shenzhen, Dapeng New District); Chongqing: G42 Shanghai–Chengdu Expressway (Shapingba District–Dazu District), G5001 Chongqing Ring Expressway; Tianjin: More areas Anhui: Huangshan City: More areas (Hongcun, Xidi, Huicheng); Tibet Autonomous Region: Lhasa (prefecture-level city): More areas (urban area, Provincial road 202 of Tibet (Lhünzhub County section), Nagqu Prefecture: More areas ( China National Highway 317(Nagqu County–Baqên County)), Chamdo: More areas ( China National Highway 317(Baxoi County–Karub District)), China National Highway 318 (Lhasa (prefecture-level city)–Lhatse County) (update), China National Highway 219 (Lhatse County–Burang County); Jiangxi: Yichun, Jiangxi: More areas (Mingyue Mountain); Anhui: Huaibei: More areas (Huiyuan Road); Hebei: Zhangjiakou: China National Highway 207 (Zhangjiakou urban area–Zhangbei County), Provincial road 242 of Hebei (Zhangjiakou urban area–Chongli County); Liaoning: Anshan: More areas (Haicheng), Dalian: More areas (urban area, Wafangdian), G15 Shenyang–Haikou Expressway (Dalian–Shenyang)
==	December 26, 2014	Beijing: More areas Shanghai: More areas Guangdong: Guangzhou: More areas (urban area, Nansha District, Panyu District, Huadu District), Shenzhen: More areas Jiangsu: Nanjing: More areas Zhejiang: Hangzhou: More areas, Ningbo: More areas Jilin: Changchun: More areas Heilongjiang: Harbin: More areas G1011 Harbin–Tongjiang Expressway (HarbinBin County, Heilongjiang–Fangzheng County); China National Highway 221 (HarbinBin County, Heilongjiang–JiamusiSuburb); China National Highway 102 (HarbinShuangcheng District–Kuancheng District); China National Highway 202 (Nangang District–Longtan District); China National Highway 301 (Shangzhi–Aimin District); China National Highway 302 (Nong'an County–Chuanying District); S26 Fusong–Changchun Expressway (Siping, Jilin–Jingyu County); G4W3 Lechang–Guangzhou Expressway (Guangzhou–Shaoguan); S33 Hangzhou–Xinganjiang–Jingdezhen Expressway (Hangzhou–Longyou County); G60 Shanghai–Kunming Expressway (Hangzhou–Longyou County); S33 Hangzhou–Xinganjiang–Jingdezhen Expressway (Hangzhou section); G92 Hangzhou Bay Ring Expressway(Hangzhou–Ningbo)
24	January 2, 2015	Jiangsu: Yancheng, Huai'an; Fujian: Sanming, Nanping, Zhangzhou, Longyan; Shandong: Zibo, Zaozhuang; Anhui: Xuancheng, Chizhou, Anqing, Ma'anshan, Huangshan City; Jiangxi: Yichun, Jiangxi; Inner Mongolia: Chifeng; Hunan: Changde, Huaihua, Yiyang; Hubei: Xianning; Guangdong: Heyuan; Sichuan: Panzhihua, Leshan, Liangshan Yi Autonomous Prefecture; Liaoning: Huludao
25	January 9, 2015	Jiangsu: Suqian, Changzhou; Anhui: Bengbu, Huaibei; Inner Mongolia: Tongliao; Henan: Pingdingshan, Hebi, Puyang, Nanyang, Henan, Shangqiu, Xinyang, Zhumadian; Sichuan: Meishan; Liaoning: Yingkou, Fuxin, Panjin
26	January 15, 2015	Anhui: Bozhou, Suzhou, Anhui, Lu'an, Huainan; Shanxi: Yangquan; Inner Mongolia: Ulanqab, Xilingol League; Hebei: Xingtai, Cangzhou, Hengshui; Henan: Anyang; Sichuan: Zigong, Yibin; Yunnan: Zhaotong; Tibet Autonomous Region: Ngari Prefecture; Shaanxi: Yulin, Shaanxi, Weinan; Ningxia: Shizuishan; Liaoning: Liaoyang
==	January 2015	Chongqing: More areas (Jiangjin District)
27	February 11, 2015	Beijing: More areas (Shunyi District, Fangshan District); Shanghai: More areas (urban area); Tianjin: More areas (Jinnan District, Baodi District, Jinghai County, Ji County, Tianjin); Guangdong: GuangzhouMore areas (Nansha District, Panyu District), ShenzhenMore areas, DongguanMore areas (towns in Dongguan); Jiangsu: NanjingMore areas (urban area), WuxiMore areas (urban area); Zhejiang: NingboMore areas (urban area), HangzhouMore areas (Xiacheng District, Shangcheng District); Anhui: Chuzhou; Shandong: JinanMore areas (urban area), QingdaoMore areas (urban area), Dezhou, Liaocheng, Dongying, Heze; Jiangxi: Shangrao; Shanxi: Shuozhou, Lüliang, Linfen, Yuncheng; Inner Mongolia: Alxa League, Wuhai; Henan: ZhengzhouMore areas (urban area), Luohe, Zhoukou; Hubei: Jingmen; Sichuan: ChengduMore areas (urban area), Guang'an, Suining, Guangyuan, Neijiang; Guizhou: Zunyi; Gansu: Dingxi, Pingliang; Ningxia: Zhongwei, Wuzhong, Ningxia; Xinjiang: Altay Prefecture; Liaoning: Chaoyang, Liaoning; Jilin: Tonghua, Siping, Jilin, Liaoyuan, Baishan, Baicheng; Heilongjiang: China National Highway 301 (Harbin–Yabuli Ski Resort), Suihua, Heihe, Yichun, Heilongjiang, Hegang, Shuangyashan, Qitaihe, Jixi, Jiamusi
28	May 8, 2015	Anhui: Fuyang; Ningxia: Guyuan; Gansu: Jinchang; Hubei: Jingzhou; Sichuan: Luzhou, Nanchong; Fujian: Ningde; Jiangsu: Taizhou, Jiangsu; Yunnan: Wenshan Zhuang and Miao Autonomous Prefecture; Guangdong: Zhanjiang
==	May 2015	G76 Xiamen–Chengdu Expressway (Chongqing–Chengdu); G15W3 Ningbo–Dongguan Expressway (Fuzhou-Xianyou); S1551 Yuxi–Pingtan Expressway (Fuqing-Pingtan); G25 Changchun–Shenzhen Expressway (Yixing–Jiangning District); G1813 Weihai–Qingdao Expressway
29	June 20, 2015	Yunnan: Xishuangbanna Dai Autonomous Prefecture; Sichuan: Dazhou; Shandong: Binzhou; Guangdong: Maoming; Xinjiang: Ili Kazakh Autonomous Prefecture; Hunan: Yongzhou; Guizhou: Tongren; Jiangxi: Yingtan, Fuzhou, Jiangxi; Henan: Sanmenxia
30	November 28, 2015	Guangxia: Zhuang Autonomous Region; Qinzhou
