= G1 Beijing–Harbin Expressway =

Expressway in northeast China

Beijing–Harbin Expressway
- 北京－哈尔滨高速公路
- Jingha Expressway 京哈高速

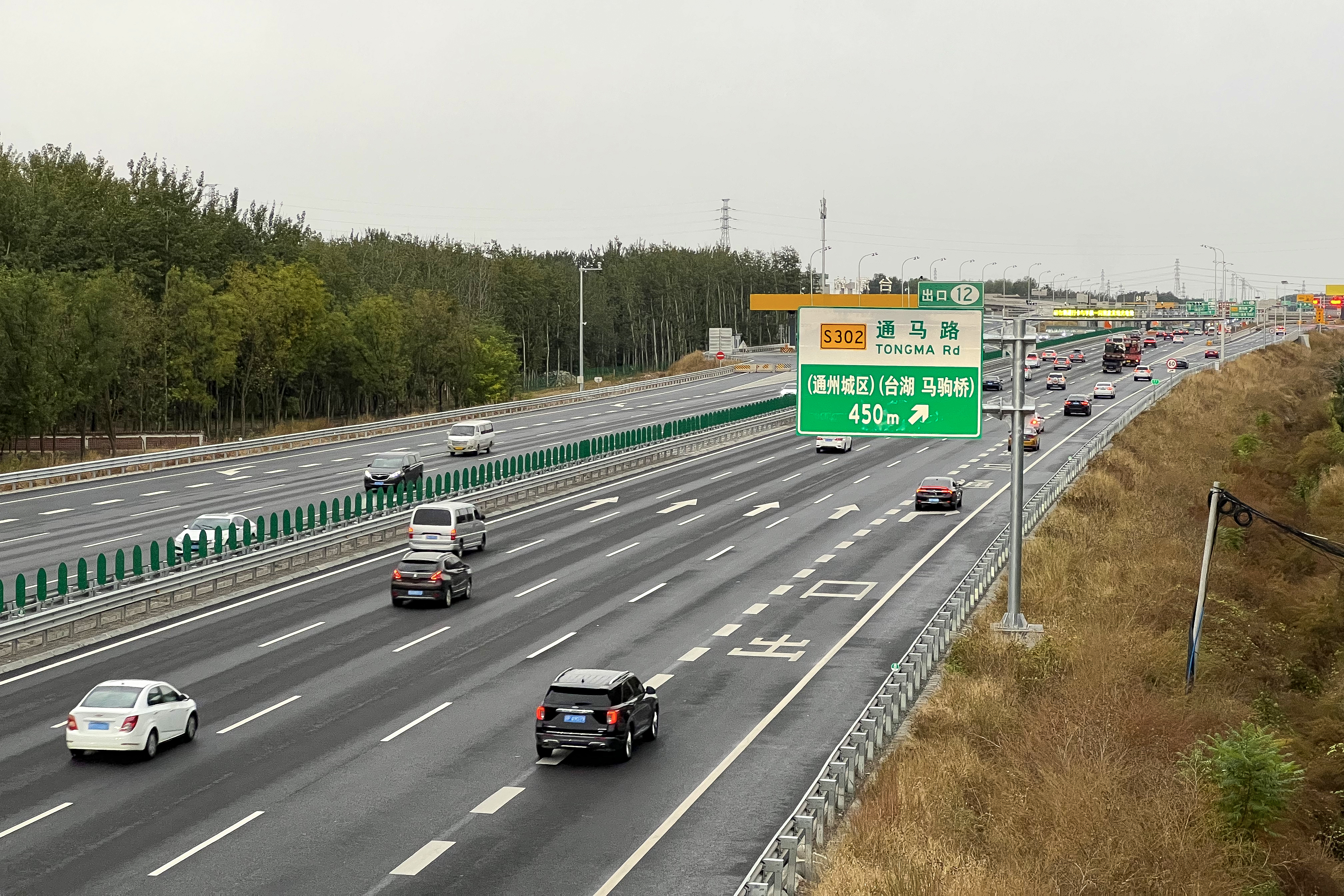
- G1 Beijing–Harbin Expressway in Chaoyang District, Beijing

Route information
- Part of AH1 AH31
- Length: 1,200 km (750 mi)
- Existed: 28 September 2001–present

Major junctions
- South end: Shuanglong Road and 4th Ring Road, Chaoyang, BJ
- G45 / G4501 in Changping, BJ; G25 in Tangshan, HE; G16 (W) in Jinzhou, LN; G2512 in Jinzhou, LN; G16 (E) in Panjin, LN; G91 in Shenyang, LN; G1113 / G1501 (S / S) in Shenyang, LN; G1113 (N) in Shenyang, LN; G1501 (N) in Shenyang, LN; G91 in Tieling, LN; G25 (S) in Tieling, LN; G25 / G2501 (N / S) in Changchun, JL; G12 (E) in Changchun, JL; G12 / G2501 (W / N) in Changchun, JL; G10 / G1001 in Harbin, HL
- North end: G102 in Harbin, HL

Location
- Country: China

Highway system
- National Trunk Highway System; Primary; Auxiliary; National Highways; Transport in China
→ G0111

The Beijing–Harbin Expressway (simplified Chinese: 北京－哈尔滨高速公路; traditional Chinese: 北京－哈爾濱高速公路), designated as G1 and commonly abbreviated as Jingha Expressway (京哈高速) is an expressway linking the cities of Beijing and Harbin, Heilongjiang.

The Beijing–Harbin Expressway is commonly referred to as the Jingha Expressway. This name is derived from the two one-character Chinese abbreviations of the two cities at which the expressway terminates, Jing for Beijing and Ha for Harbin.

== Route ==
The Beijing–Harbin Expressway runs from Beijing, the national capital, to Harbin, the capital of Heilongjiang Province. It passes through the following major cities:

- Beijing
- Langfang, Hebei
- Tianjin
- Tangshan, Hebei
- Qinhuangdao, Hebei
- Huludao, Liaoning
- Jinzhou, Liaoning
- Shenyang, Liaoning
- Siping, Jilin
- Changchun, Jilin
- Harbin, Heilongjiang

== History ==
The first section of the Beijing–Harbin Expressway, opened in the 1990s was the short-lived Jingqin Expressway, running between the outskirts of Beijing and Qinhuangdao.

In the 1990s the expressway was extended northeast from Qinhuangdao to Shenyang and westward to the 4th Ring Road in Beijing to become the Jingshen Expressway. The 658 km expressway from central Beijing to Shenyang was completed in time for the 50th anniversary of the People's Republic of China. It opened to the general motoring public on September 15, 1999, after four years of work on different sections.

The expressway was extended to Harbin during the rapid expansion of the Chinese expressway system in the 2000s. The completed expressway was opened on September 28, 2001. It is now one of the seven radial expressways emanating from Beijing.

Improvements were made to the expressway in 2003 and 2004 by removing several toll stations in 2003 and repairing the previously uneven road surface between the 6th Ring Road and Xijizhen in Beijing in 2004.

On October 8, 2004, 36 vehicles were involved a horrendous series of car crashes on the expressway. The crashes occurred in the westbound lanes near the interchange with the Jinji Expressway, in the Tianjin municipality. Traffic was delayed up for over one and a half hours.

== Toll network ==
When the expressway opened in September 1999, there was a large amount of complaints about the number of toll booths. In some cases, a toll booth appeared every 15 kilometres.

The Jingshen expressway was constructed by several different organisations, and as a result, each organization set up their own toll gate. This made the route slow to travel on, as traffic piled up in front of toll gates.

The PRC Ministry of Communications declared that, effective September 1, 2003, the Baodi toll gate in Tianjin and the Yutian toll gate in Hebei would be demolished, in order to create a networked toll system. Additionally, two expressway toll gates near Shanhaiguan would be merged as one. These plans also suggested that the toll gate at Bailu, Beijing, just east of the Eastern 5th Ring Road, would be demolished as well, as soon as Beijing finished joining the networked toll system. The toll gate at Xianghe in Hebei, however, would be kept.

Thus, for the section from Xianghe in western Hebei through to Shanhaiguan in eastern Hebei (and even through the Tianjin portion), this networked toll system applies—one of the first of its kind. This does away with the previous system, where toll booths appeared every time the jurisdiction changed. For some odd reason, Beijing and Liaoning are still not part of the networked toll system.

China plans to expand the networked toll system nationwide, starting with the Jingshen expressway as a testing ground. The changes have been accepted positively. Average speed on the expressway has gone up, and the Road Traffic Safety Law of the People's Republic of China raised maximum speed limits on expressways nationwide from 110 km/h to 120 km/h. These improvements have made traffic jams far less frequent.

== Detailed facilities ==
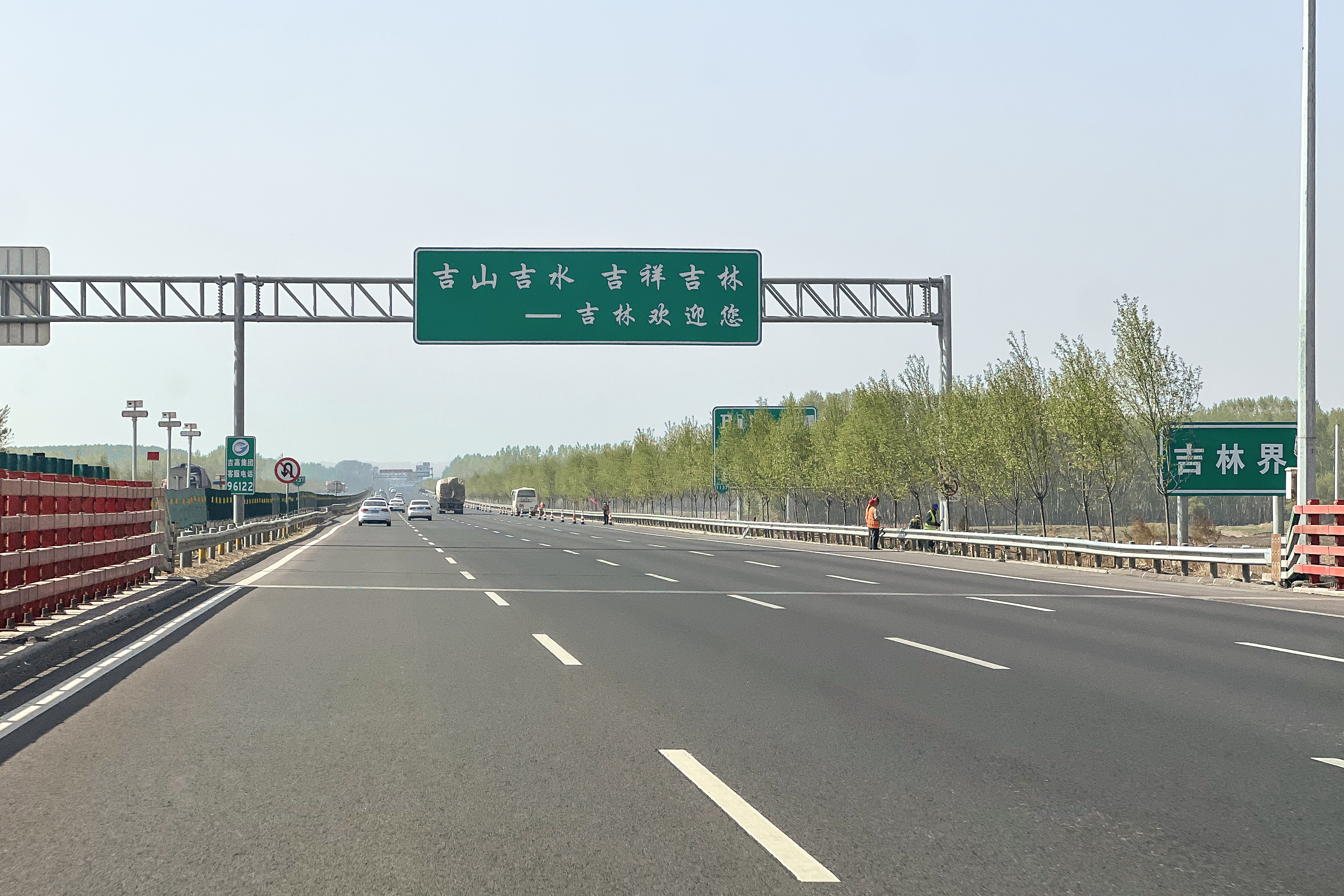
G1 Expressway at the Jilin-Heilongjiang border

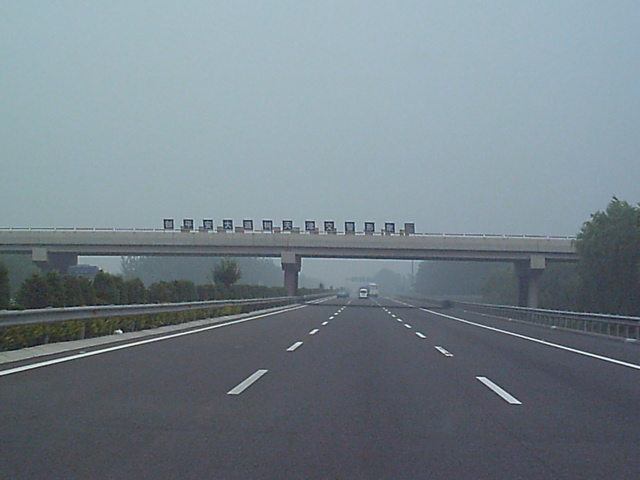
Jingshen Expressway (Tianjin segment)

District/County	City	Province	Location	km	Junction	Destinations	Notes
Chaoyang	Beijing		Sifang Bridge		0	4th Ring Road – towards Sihui (north) / Shibalidian (south); Shuanglong Road – Beijing University of Technology	No north-to-west ramp, west-to-south traffic via side road
Chaoyang	Beijing		Houfeng Bridge (Louzizhuang)			W. Jinchan Road – Nanlouzizhuang (north) / Happy Valley Beijing (south) (via side road)	No westbound entrance Nanlouzizhuang & Happy Valley
Chaoyang	Beijing		Fatou			Houjin Road (eastbound) (via side road)	Westbound entrance and eastbound exit
Chaoyang	Beijing		Fatou Bridge			Huagong Road – towards Beijing S50 (S. 5th Ring) (south) / Nanmofang (northwest)	Westbound exits, eastbound entrances and west-to-south exit
Chaoyang	Beijing		Wangsiying Bridge			Gaobeidian Road (via side road)	
Chaoyang	Beijing		Beijing Anti-drug Education Base			Side road	Westbound entrance and eastbount exit
Chaoyang	Beijing		Wufang Bridge			Beijing S50 (E. 5th Ring) – towards Guangqu Freeway (north) / Beijing S15 (south)	
Chaoyang	Beijing		Dougezhuang			W. Tonghuiguanqu Road (eastbound) / Shuangqiao Road (westbound) (via side road)	Westbound entrance and eastbount exit allows U-turn to westbound via side road
Chaoyang	Beijing		Langxinzhuang			Rongchen Road (eastbound) / Langxinzhuang Road (Westbound) (via side road)	No westbound exit two westbound entrances, one directly access and another via side road
Chaoyang	Beijing		Beijing Bailu		Toll	–	Has westbound parking area
Chaoyang / Tongzhou	Beijing		Puhe No.1 Bridge (Taihu)			S302 Tongma Road – towards Jiukeshu (northeast) / Beijing S15 (southwest)	Heizhuanghu & Wanshengxi
Tongzhou	Beijing		Tianjiafu			Universal Beijing Resort parking area / Huanqiu Avenue / Rixin Road / Qiantian Road / Wenlü Road / Yunliangyinhe Road	
Tongzhou	Beijing		Tianjiafu		Service Area	–	
Tongzhou	Beijing		Shiyuan Bridge (Zhangjiawan)			G4501 (E. 6th Ring) – towards Tongzhou (northeast-bound) / Daxing (southwest-bound); Xijian Road (west-to-south exit); X015 Zhangtai Road (southeastern entrance); Dagaolizhuang Road (northwestern entrance)	Universal Resort
Tongzhou	Beijing		Yaoxinzhuang Bridge (Kuoxian)			G103 – Zhangjiawan (northwest) / Kuoxian (southeast); G509	
Tongzhou	Beijing		Langfu 4th Bridge			Suwang Road – X002 Hulang Road (west)	
Tongzhou	Beijing		Xiji 1st Bridge			S207 Chuangyi Middle Road; Liangli 5th Street	
Tongzhou	Beijing		Xiji		Police check	–	Westbound
Tongzhou	Beijing		Xiaohuidian Bridge			G95 – towards Sanhe (north) / Langfang (southwest)	
Tongzhou	Beijing		U-turn ramp			Westbound	internal access
Xianghe, Langfang, Hebei			Xianghe			G230 (Wuyi Road) – Dachang (north) / Xianghe (south)	Has also Service Area
Xianghe, Langfang, Hebei			Xianghe East			Tongbao Road – Beijing Jingshan School Xianghe Campus (east) / S274 Pingxiang Highway (west)	
Baodi, Tianjin			Baoping			S210 Pingbao Highway – Houjiaying (north) / Baodi (south)	
Baodi, Tianjin			Niudaokou		Service Area	–	Eastbound
Baodi, Tianjin			Baodi		Service Area	–	
Baodi, Tianjin			Jinwei			G233 (Jinwei Highway)	
Baodi, Tianjin			Baodi North			Tianjin S1 Jinji Expressway – towards Jizhou (north) / Tianjin Urban Area (south)	
Baodi, Tianjin			Jingha Expwy Junction			Tianjin S21 – towards Jizhou (north) / Binhai (south)	
Baodi, Tianjin			Xinzhong			X565 Xinzhong Road (north); X574 Linzhong Road (south)	
Baodi, Tianjin			Xinanzhen		Service Area	–	
Yutian	Tangshan	Hebei	Yutian			S028	
Yutian	Tangshan	Hebei	Yutian		Service Area	–	
Yutian	Tangshan	Hebei	Yahongqiao			S123 Yubin Highway	
Fengrun	Tangshan	Hebei	Gaogezhuang			G25 – towards Zunhua (north) / Fengnan (south)	
Fengrun	Tangshan	Hebei	Tangshan North			G112 (N. Jianshe Road)	Fengrun South
Fengrun	Tangshan	Hebei	Fengrun		Parking Area	–	
Fengrun / Kaiping	Tangshan	Hebei	Donghuanggezhuang			Hebei S0105 – towards Wangpanzhuang	
Luanzhou	Tangshan	Hebei	Yizishan			Hebei S53 – towards Qianxi	
Luanzhou	Tangshan	Hebei	Zhenzizhen			S262 Qiancao Highway	
Luanzhou	Tangshan	Hebei	Luanzhou		Service Area	–	
Qian'an	Tangshan	Hebei	Shaheyi			Hebei S51 – towards Qian'an (north) / Luanzhou (south)	
Qian'an	Tangshan	Hebei	Qian'an		Parking Area	–	
Qian'an	Tangshan	Hebei	Qian'an Luanzhou			G508 (Pingqingle Highway)	Luanhe
Lulong	Qinhuangdao	Hebei	Lulong		Service Area	–	
Lulong	Qinhuangdao	Hebei	Lulong			S026 Luchen Highway (Longcheng Road) – Sheliu Highway (south)	
Funing	Qinhuangdao	Hebei	Funing			S261 E. Binhe Road – G102 (north)	Funing
Funing	Qinhuangdao	Hebei	Beidaihe			Hebei S9960 – towards Beidaihe	
Funing	Qinhuangdao	Hebei	Beidaihe		Service Area	–	
Funing	Qinhuangdao	Hebei	Daishantou			G0111 – towards Changli (south); Hebei S52 – towards Daxinzhai (north)	
Funing	Qinhuangdao	Hebei	Qinhuangdao			Zushan Connection Highway – G102 (north)	Houying
Haigang	Qinhuangdao	Hebei	Qinhuangdao North			S251 Qinqing Road – G102 (north)	Qinhuangdao
Haigang	Qinhuangdao	Hebei	Qinhuangdao East			N. Donggang Road – S269 Chengqin Chuhai Road (north)	
Shanhaiguan	Qinhuangdao	Hebei	Maojiagou			G0121 – towards Liujiang National Park (northwest) / Ledao Park (southeast)	north-to-west and south-to-west ramps are under construction
Shanhaiguan	Qinhuangdao	Hebei	Hebei Shanhaiguan Gate		–	–	formerly toll booth, now a tourism gate
Shanhaiguan	Qinhuangdao	Hebei	Shanhaiguan		Service Area	–	
Shanhaiguan, Qinhuangdao, Hebei / Suizhong, Huludao, Liaoning			Mengjiang Shanhaiguan			G102 (N. Guancheng Road); S023 N. Zhejiang Road	
Suizhong	Huludao	Liaoning	Dongdaihe			G102; Dongdaihe Street	Dongdaihe / Wanjia
Suizhong	Huludao	Liaoning	Wanjia		Service Area	–	
Suizhong	Huludao	Liaoning	Xidianzi			Jiumenkou Branch Expressway	northeast-bound entrance and southwest-bound exit
Suizhong	Huludao	Liaoning	Qianwei			G102	
Suizhong	Huludao	Liaoning	Qianwei			G4515	
Suizhong	Huludao	Liaoning	Suizhong		Service Area	–	
Suizhong	Huludao	Liaoning	Suizhong			G306 (Wenhua Road); Hanjia Road	Suizhong North
Xingcheng	Huludao	Liaoning	Dazhai			G102	
Xingcheng	Huludao	Liaoning	Shahousuo			Shashang Highway – G102 (east)	Shahousuo
Xingcheng	Huludao	Liaoning	Xingcheng		Service Area	–	
Xingcheng	Huludao	Liaoning	Xingcheng			Xingxi Highway – G102 (east)	Xingcheng
Xingcheng	Huludao	Liaoning	Xingcheng North			Liaoning S26 – towards G102 (east) / Jianchang (west)	
Lianshan	Huludao	Liaoning	Huludao			Haichen Road – G102 (east)	Huludao North
Lianshan	Huludao	Liaoning	Huludao East			Daodong Highway – G102 (southeast); Hujin Highway	
Lianshan	Huludao	Liaoning	Tashan		Service Area	–	
Lianshan	Huludao	Liaoning	Tashan			G102	
Nanpiao	Huludao	Liaoning	Nanpiao			S306	Gaoqiaozhen
Taihe	Jinzhou	Liaoning	Jinzhou			S204 (Bohai Avenue) – Jinzhou (north) / G102 (south)	Jinzhou South
Taihe	Jinzhou	Liaoning	Songshan			G16 – towards Chaoyang	Start of G16 concurrency
Taihe	Jinzhou	Liaoning	Jinzhou East		Service Area	–	
Taihe	Jinzhou	Liaoning	Jinzhou East			S209; Longqiwan Avenue	
Linghai	Jinzhou	Liaoning	Linghai		Service Area	–	
Linghai	Jinzhou	Liaoning	Mingzitun			G2512 – towards Yixian	Connection to an unnamed road is under construction
Linghai	Jinzhou	Liaoning	Linghai			X711 Linghai Avenue	Linghai South
Linghai	Jinzhou	Liaoning	Guanghui		Service Area	–	
Linghai	Jinzhou	Liaoning	Guanghui			S308 Dajin Highway	
Panshan, Panjin		Liaoning	Panshan			G16 – towards Dawa; G4513 – towards Beizhen	End of G16 concurrency
Panshan, Panjin		Liaoning	Panjin		Service Area	–	
Panshan, Panjin		Liaoning	Panjin North			G305 (Liaohe Road north section / W. Huancheng Road north section)	Hujiazhen
Panshan, Panjin		Liaoning	Gaosheng			S210 N. Gaosheng Road	
Tai'an, Anshan		Liaoning	Xujiawobao			Antai Expressway	
Tai'an, Anshan		Liaoning	Tai'an			S307 Anyang Road; Yingbin Road	
Liaozhong	Shenyang	Liaoning	Liaozhong			G91 – towards Xinmin (northwest) / Liaoyang (southeast)	
Liaozhong	Shenyang	Liaoning	Liaozhong		Service Area	–	
Liaozhong	Shenyang	Liaoning	Liaozhong			S107 Shangye Street; Beiwu Road	Liaozhong
Liaozhong	Shenyang	Liaoning	Ciyutuo			S107; S304 Sixiao Highway	
Liaozhong	Shenyang	Liaoning	Ciyutuo			Liaoning S20 – towards Dengta	
Tiexi	Shenyang	Liaoning	Gaohua			Panwu Highway	has also Service Area; Gaohua
Tiexi / Yuhong	Shenyang	Liaoning	Shenyang West			Shenda Road	
Tiexi / Yuhong	Shenyang	Liaoning	Beiliguan			G1501 – towards Sujiatun	Start of G1113 and G1501 concurrency End of AH1 section, start of AH31 section Yingbinlu
Yuhong	Shenyang	Liaoning	Shenyang		Service Area	–	only on side of north-to-west ramp of Beiliguan junction
Yuhong	Shenyang	Liaoning	Hongqitai			G304 (Hongxing Road); W. Guangye Road; Dongpinghu Street	
Yuhong	Shenyang	Liaoning	Dazhuanwan			G1113 – towards Xinmin	End of G1113 concurrency
Yuhong	Shenyang	Liaoning	Xijiang Street			Xijiang Street; Qiyunshan Road	Zhuanwanqiao
Yuhong / Huanggu	Shenyang	Liaoning	Santaizi			G101 (N. Huanghe Avenue)	Shifandaxue and Yixueyuan
Shenbei	Shenyang	Liaoning	Lingyuan Street			Xiaoxin Street; Luohu Street	Tianyitun
Shenbei	Shenyang	Liaoning	Shenbei			G2519 (was S2) – towards Faku	
Dadong / Shenbei	Shenyang	Liaoning	Zhuertun			G203 (N. Wanghua Street)	Huishan
Dadong	Shenyang	Liaoning	Yulin		Service Area	–	
Dadong / Shenbei	Shenyang	Liaoning	Wangjiagou			G1501 – towards Dongling Park; Wangjiagou Street	End of G1501 concurrency
Shenbei	Shenyang	Liaoning	Puhe			G102 (N. Huishan Street)	
Shenbei	Shenyang	Liaoning	Qingshuitai			S107 Hangzhou Road	
Tieling	Tieling	Liaoning	Tieling South			Wanquan Road	
Tieling	Tieling	Liaoning	Yaobao		Service Area	–	
Tieling	Tieling	Liaoning	Yaobao			G91 – towards Qixing Lake (northwest) / Fushun (southeast)	
Tieling	Tieling	Liaoning	Tieling New Area			Ganjiang Road	Luanshishan & Tieling West
Yinzhou	Tieling	Liaoning	Tieling			G102 (Chaihe Street south section)	
Yinzhou	Tieling	Liaoning	Tieling		Service Area	–	
Yinzhou	Tieling	Liaoning	Tieling North			G102	
Kaiyuan	Tieling	Liaoning	Kaiyuan		Service Area	–	
Kaiyuan	Tieling	Liaoning	Kaiyuan			Xiaolitai Street – G505 (Yihe Road)	
Kaiyuan	Tieling	Liaoning	Jingouzi			Liaoning S14 – towards Xifeng; G102	
Changtu	Tieling	Liaoning	Changtu		Service Area	–	
Changtu	Tieling	Liaoning	Changtu			G102	
Changtu	Tieling	Liaoning	Shuangmiaozi			Shuangshang Highway – G102 (west)	
Changtu	Tieling	Liaoning	Xingshan			Liaoning S17 – towards Kangping	Northbound entrance and Southbound exit
Changtu, Tieling Liaoning / Tiedong, Siping, Jilin			Maojiadian		Service Area	–	
Tiedong	Siping	Jilin	Siping			G303 (Kaifaquda Road)	
Tiedong	Siping	Jilin	Siping		Service Area	–	
Lishu	Siping	Jilin	Lishu			G1112 – towards Shuangliao (northwest) / Liaoyuan (southeast)	
Lishu	Siping	Jilin	Lishu East			G102	
Lishu	Siping	Jilin	Kaoshantun		Service Area	–	
Lishu	Siping	Jilin	Guojiadian			X053	
Gongzhuling	Changchun	Jilin	Gongzhuling		Service Area	–	
Gongzhuling	Changchun	Jilin	Gongzhuling			Yingbin Road – G102	Gongzhuling South
Gongzhuling	Changchun	Jilin	Tianyuanzi			G9902	
Gongzhuling	Changchun	Jilin	Taojiatun		Service Area	–	
Gongzhuling	Changchun	Jilin	Fanjiatun			X063 – G102 (northwest)	Fanjiatun
Gongzhuling	Changchun	Jilin	Fanjiatun		Service Area	–	
Gongzhuling / Chaoyang	Changchun	Jilin	Banjiegou			G2501 – towards Lüyuan	Start of G2501 concurrency
Nanguan	Changchun	Jilin	Changchun		Service Area	–	
Nanguan	Changchun	Jilin	Changchun South			G0112 (was Jilin S1) – towards Yitong; Yatai Street Freeway	Huaqing Road
Erdao	Changchun	Jilin	Jingyue			G334 (Jingyue Street)	Shiji Square & Jinxin Street
Erdao	Changchun	Jilin	Jingyue			G1221	
Erdao	Changchun	Jilin	Changchun East			G12 – towards Jilin; Jilinda Road	Start of G12 concurrency Changchun East & Longquan; Dongfang Square
Kuancheng	Changchun	Jilin	Xinglong			S101 Changji North Route	
Kuancheng	Changchun	Jilin	Yuanda Street			N. Yuanda Street	Daxuecheng Road
Kuancheng	Changchun	Jilin	Xiaoxitun			G2501 – towards Lüyuan	End of G12 and G2501 concurrency
Kuancheng	Changchun	Jilin	Mishazi		Service Area	–	
Kuancheng	Changchun	Jilin	Sino-Korean Demonstration Area			G102	
Dehui	Changchun	Jilin	Zhuchengzi			G102	
Dehui	Changchun	Jilin	Zhuchengzi		Parking Area	–	
Dehui	Changchun	Jilin	Dehui			G9902	
Dehui	Changchun	Jilin	Dehui		Service Area	–	
Dehui	Changchun	Jilin	Dehui			Songbai Road	
Dehui	Changchun	Jilin	Dehui North		Service Area	–	
Dehui	Changchun	Jilin	Caiyuanzi			X025	
Fuyu, Songyuan		Jilin	Taolaizhao			S301 Yutao Highway	
Fuyu, Songyuan		Jilin	Taolaizhao		Service Area	–	
Fuyu, Songyuan		Jilin	Fuyu			G1015 – towards Yushu (east) / Songyuan (west)	
Fuyu, Songyuan		Jilin	Fuyu			G503; Sanchahe Street	Fuyu North
Fuyu, Songyuan		Jilin	Fuyu		Parking Area	–	
Fuyu, Songyuan		Jilin	Caijiagou			X024	
Shuangcheng	Harbin, Heilongjiang		Lalinhe		Service Area	–	
Shuangcheng	Harbin, Heilongjiang		Shijia			G102	
Shuangcheng	Harbin, Heilongjiang		Shuangcheng		Parking Area	–	
Shuangcheng	Harbin, Heilongjiang		Shuangcheng			Baoxu Avenue	
Shuangcheng	Harbin, Heilongjiang		Xinxing			G9901	
Shuangcheng	Harbin, Heilongjiang		Xinxing			Qianjiang Road, Xing'an Road	
Shuangcheng	Harbin, Heilongjiang		Yunlianghe		Service Area	–	
Nangang	Harbin, Heilongjiang		Hangtiancheng			Songhua Road	
Xiangfang	Harbin, Heilongjiang		Harbin South			G1001 – towards G1221 (east) / HRB (west)	
Xiangfang	Harbin, Heilongjiang		Harbin South		Toll	–	
Xiangfang	Harbin, Heilongjiang		Xuefu Road			Xuefu Road	Tongjiang Road & Wapenyao
1.000 mi = 1.609 km; 1.000 km = 0.621 mi: Concurrency terminus; Incomplete access; Proposed
