= Jingha =

Jingha may refer to:

- Jingha Expressway, expressway in China that links Beijing to Harbin
- Jingha railway, railway in China that connects Beijing with Harbin
