= Liangjiadian =

Liangjiadian may refer to the following places in China:

- Liangjiadian, Hebei, in Yutian County, Hebei
- Liangjiadian Subdistrict, in Jinzhou, Dalian
