= Yuguan =

Yuguan may refer to:

- Yumen Pass or Yumenguan, frequently abbreviated as Yuguan (玉关), pass on the Great Wall in Gansu
- Yuguan Township (虞关乡), subdivision of Hui County, Gansu
- Yuguan, Hebei (榆关镇), town in and subdivision of Funing County, Hebei
