= Funing =

Funing may refer to the following locations in China:

- Ningde, Fujian, formerly named Funing
- Funing County, Hebei (抚宁县)
- Funing County, Jiangsu (阜宁县)
- Funing County, Yunnan (富宁县)
- Funing, Heilongjiang (阜宁镇), town in Suifenhe
- Funing, Hebei (抚宁镇), town in and seat of Funing County, Hebei
