= G2512 Fuxin–Jinzhou Expressway =

Expressway in Liaoning, China

Fuxin–Jinzhou Expressway
- 阜新－锦州高速公路
- Fujin Expressway 阜锦高速公路

Route information
- Auxiliary route of G25

Major junctions
- North end: G25 in Fuxin
- South end: G1 / G16 in Linghai, Jinzhou

Location
- Country: China

Highway system
- National Trunk Highway System; Primary; Auxiliary; National Highways; Transport in China
| ← G2511 | → G2513 |

The G2512 Fuxin–Jinzhou Expressway (Chinese: 阜新—锦州高速公路), commonly referred to as the Fujin Expressway (Chinese: 阜锦高速公路), is an expressway that connects the cities of Fuxin and Jinzhou in the Chinese province of Liaoning. The expressway is a spur of G25 Changchun–Shenzhen Expressway.
