= Quantou Town =

Quantou Town 泉头镇
- Town
- Location in Liaoning
- Coordinates: 42°48′N 124°06′E
- Country: China
- Province: Liaoning
- Prefecture-level city: Tieling
- County: Changtu
- Town seat: Quantou Town

Area
  - Total: 140 km^{2} (54 sq mi)
- Elevation: 445.1 m (1,460 ft)
- Time zone: UTC+8 (China Standard)
- Postal code: 112502

Quantou Town (simplified Chinese: 泉头镇; traditional Chinese: 泉頭鎮; pinyin: Quántóu Zhèn) is a town in the northeast of Liaoning province, China. It is under the administration of Changtu County. It is served by China National Highway 102.

== Administrative divisions ==
There are 12 villages under the town's administration.

Villages:

- Quantou Community (泉头社区)
- Majia Village (马家村)
- Daweizi Village (大苇子村)
- Hulin Village (护林村)
- Shihuzi Village (石虎子村)
- Quantou Village (泉头村)
- Qiaokoudong Village (桥口东村)
- Lianhe Village (联合村)
- Nonglin Village (农林村)
- Huangdingzi Village (黄顶子村)
- Erdao Village (二道村)
- Linchang (林场)
