= Chapeng Township =

Chapeng Township 茶棚乡
- Rural Township
- Chápéng Xiāng
- Location in Hebei Location in China
- Coordinates: 39°54′34″N 119°07′25″E
- Country: People's Republic of China
- Province: Hebei
- Prefecture-level city: Qinhuangdao
- District: Funing

Area
  - Total: 116.6 km^{2} (45.0 sq mi)

Population (2010)
  - Total: 37,426
  - Density: 321.1/km^{2} (832/sq mi)
- Time zone: UTC+8 (China Standard)

Chapeng Township (Chinese: 茶棚乡; pinyin: Chápéng Xiāng) is a rural township located in Funing District, Qinhuangdao, Hebei, China. According to the 2010 census, Chapeng Township had a population of 37,426, including 19,307 males and 18,119 females. The population was distributed as follows: 5,518 people aged under 14, 27,953 people aged between 15 and 64, and 3,955 people aged over 65.

== See also ==
- List of township-level divisions of Hebei
