= Caitingqiao =

Caitingqiao 彩亭桥镇
- Town
- Cǎitíngqiáo Zhèn
- Location in Hebei Location in China
- Coordinates: 39°54′11″N 117°39′20″E
- Country: People's Republic of China
- Province: Hebei
- Prefecture-level city: Tangshan
- County: Yutian

Area
  - Total: 27.63 km^{2} (10.67 sq mi)

Population (2010)
  - Total: 19,664
  - Density: 711.8/km^{2} (1,844/sq mi)
- Time zone: UTC+8 (China Standard)

Caitingqiao (Chinese: 彩亭桥镇; pinyin: Cǎitíngqiáo Zhèn) is a town located in Yutian County, Tangshan, Hebei, China. According to the 2010 census, Caitingqiao had a population of 19,664, including 10,000 males and 9,664 females. The population was distributed as follows: 3,271 people aged under 14, 14,474 people aged between 15 and 64, and 1,919 people aged over 65.

== See also ==
- List of township-level divisions of Hebei
