= Daxinzhai =

Daxinzhai 大新寨镇
- Town
- Dàxīnzhài Zhèn
- Location in Hebei Location in China
- Coordinates: 40°03′25″N 119°16′40″E
- Country: People's Republic of China
- Province: Hebei
- Prefecture-level city: Qinhuangdao
- District: Funing

Area
  - Total: 197.9 km^{2} (76.4 sq mi)

Population (2010)
  - Total: 33,709
  - Density: 170.4/km^{2} (441/sq mi)
- Time zone: UTC+8 (China Standard)

Daxinzhai (Chinese: 大新寨镇; pinyin: Dàxīnzhài Zhèn) is a town located in Funing District, Qinhuangdao, Hebei, China. According to the 2010 census, Daxinzhai had a population of 33,709, including 17,487 males and 16,222 females. The population was distributed as follows: 5,031 people aged under 14, 24,768 people aged between 15 and 64, and 3,910 people aged over 65.

== See also ==
- List of township-level divisions of Hebei
