= Daxing, Changtu County =

Daxing 大兴镇
- Town
- Location in Liaoning
- Coordinates: 42.7923°N 123.8565°E
- Country: People's Republic of China
- Province: Liaoning
- Prefecture-level city: Tieling
- County: Changtu County
- Time zone: UTC+8 (China Standard)

Daxing (simplified Chinese: 大兴; traditional Chinese: 大興; pinyin: Dàxīng) is a town under the administration of Changtu County, Liaoning, China. As of 2018, it has one residential community and 10 villages under its administration.
