= Changtu County =

Changtu 昌图县
- County
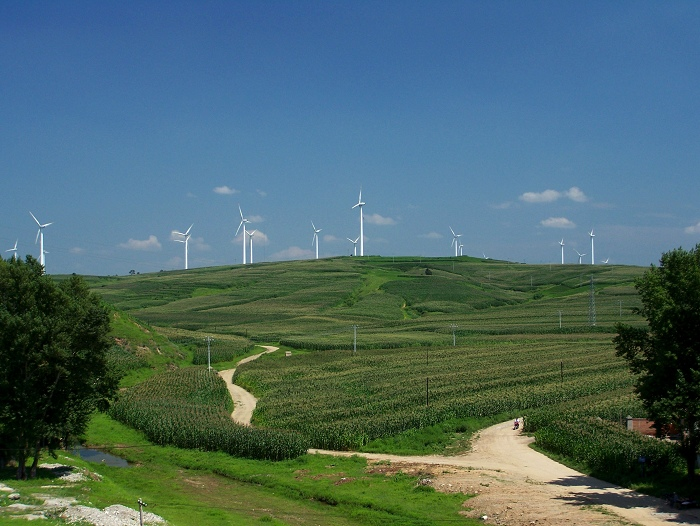
- A wind farm in Changtu County

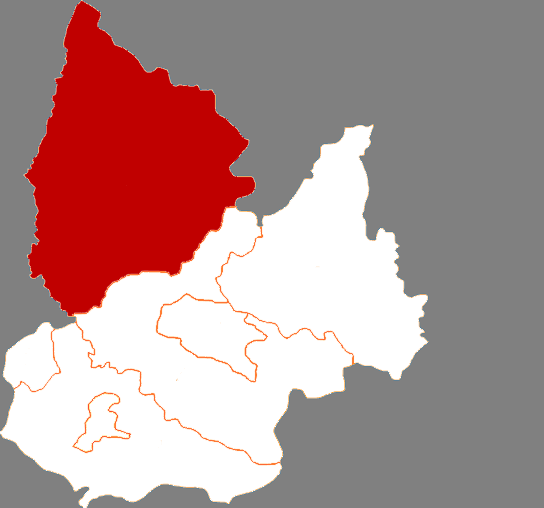
- Location in Tieling

- Location of the seat in Liaoning
- Coordinates (Changtu County government): 42°47′09″N 124°06′40″E
- Country: People's Republic of China
- Province: Liaoning
- Prefecture-level city: Tieling
- County seat: Changtu, Changtu County

Area
  - Total: 4,321.7 km^{2} (1,668.6 sq mi)
- Elevation: 152 m (499 ft)

Population (2020)
  - Total: 711,818
  - Density: 164.71/km^{2} (426.59/sq mi)
- Time zone: UTC+8 (China Standard)
- Postal code: 112500
- Website: http://www.changtu.gov.cn/

Changtu County (simplified Chinese: 昌图县; traditional Chinese: 昌圖縣; pinyin: Chāngtú Xiàn) is a county in the northeast of Liaoning province, China, bordering Jilin to the northeast and Inner Mongolia in the northwest. It is under the administration of Tieling City, the downtown of which lies 60 kilometres (37 mi) to the south-southwest, and is 47 kilometres (29 mi) southwest of Siping, Jilin. It is served by both China National Highway 102 and G1 Beijing–Harbin Expressway.

== Administrative divisions ==
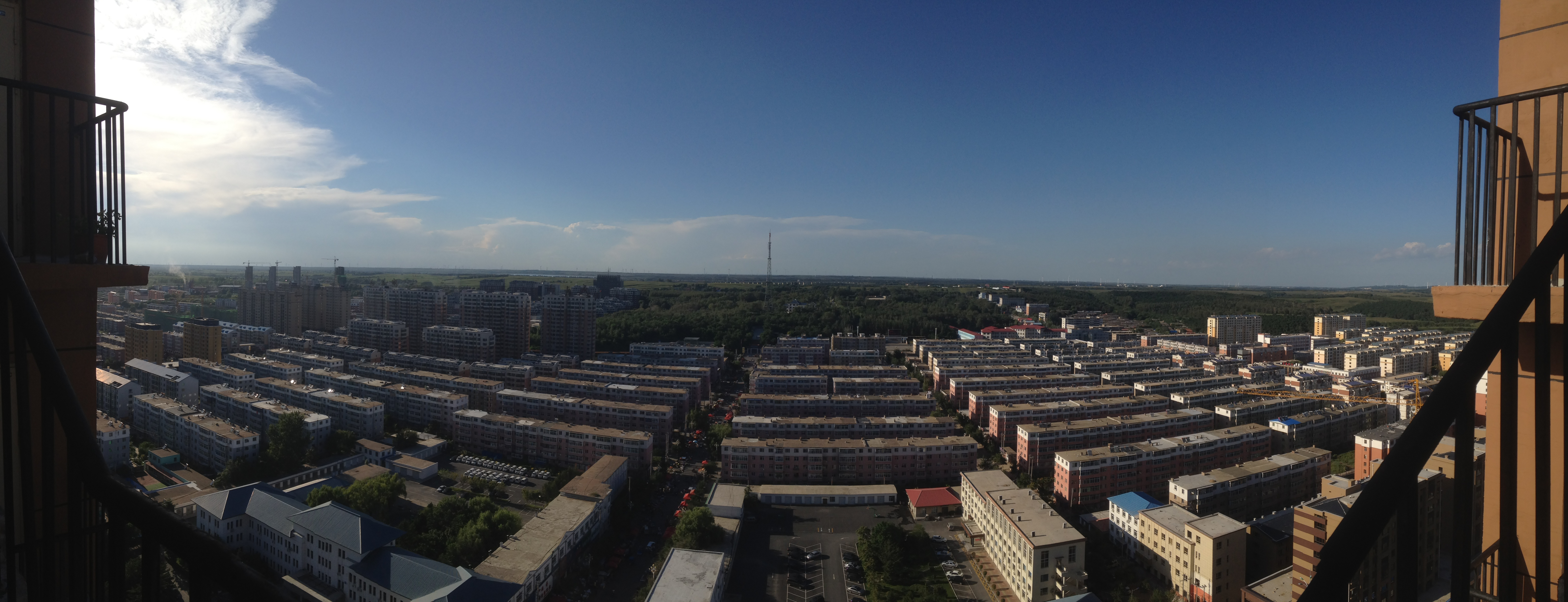
The Skyline of Changtu

There are 33 towns under the county's administration.

Towns:

- Changtu (昌图镇)
- Laocheng (老城镇)
- Bamiancheng (八面城镇)
- Sanjiangkou (三江口镇)
- Jinjia (金家镇)
- Baoli (宝力镇)
- Quantou (泉头镇)
- Shuangmiaozi (双庙子镇)
- Liangzhongqiao (亮中桥镇)
- Mazhonghe (马仲河镇)
- Maojiadian (毛家店镇)
- Laosiping (老四平镇)
- Dawa (大洼镇)
- Toudao (头道镇)
- Cilushu (𪉈鹭树镇)
- Fujia (傅家镇)
- Sihe (四合镇)
- Chaoyang (朝阳镇)
- Guyushu (古榆树镇)
- Qijiazi (七家子镇)
- Dongga (东嘎镇)
- Simiancheng (四面城镇)
- Qianshuangjing (前双井镇)
- Tongjiangkou (通江口镇)
- Dasijiazi (大四家子镇)
- Qujiadian (曲家店镇)
- Shibajiazi (十八家子镇)
- Taiping (太平镇)
- Xia'ertai (下二台镇)
- Ping'anbao (平安堡镇)
- Daxing (大兴镇)
- Houyao (后窑镇)
- Changfa (长发镇)

== Demographics ==
As of 2019, Changtu County has a population of 984,226 people, of which 29.89% lived in urban settlements, and the remaining 70.11% lived in rural ones. Of this population, 50.5% was male, 49.5% was female, 13.11% were aged 17 and under, 20.05% were between 18 and 34 years old, 43.68% were between 35 and 59, and the remaining 23.16% were aged 60 and older.

== Climate ==
Climate data for Changtu, elevation 165 m (541 ft), (1991–2020 normals, extremes 1981–2025)
Month	Jan	Feb	Mar	Apr	May	Jun	Jul	Aug	Sep	Oct	Nov	Dec	Year
Record high °C (°F)	5.6 (42.1)	16.0 (60.8)	23.5 (74.3)	29.3 (84.7)	33.5 (92.3)	35.8 (96.4)	36.5 (97.7)	36.4 (97.5)	32.8 (91.0)	27.7 (81.9)	20.4 (68.7)	12.1 (53.8)	36.5 (97.7)
Mean daily maximum °C (°F)	−7.3 (18.9)	−2.1 (28.2)	5.8 (42.4)	15.7 (60.3)	22.8 (73.0)	26.9 (80.4)	28.6 (83.5)	27.6 (81.7)	23.3 (73.9)	14.8 (58.6)	3.7 (38.7)	−5.0 (23.0)	12.9 (55.2)
Daily mean °C (°F)	−12.5 (9.5)	−7.6 (18.3)	0.4 (32.7)	9.8 (49.6)	17.1 (62.8)	21.8 (71.2)	24.2 (75.6)	22.9 (73.2)	17.4 (63.3)	9.1 (48.4)	−1.1 (30.0)	−9.8 (14.4)	7.6 (45.7)
Mean daily minimum °C (°F)	−17.0 (1.4)	−12.5 (9.5)	−4.4 (24.1)	4.3 (39.7)	11.7 (53.1)	17.2 (63.0)	20.5 (68.9)	19.0 (66.2)	12.3 (54.1)	4.2 (39.6)	−5.3 (22.5)	−14.1 (6.6)	3.0 (37.4)
Record low °C (°F)	−32.8 (−27.0)	−28.7 (−19.7)	−19.8 (−3.6)	−7.9 (17.8)	0.3 (32.5)	5.7 (42.3)	12.5 (54.5)	7.6 (45.7)	−0.4 (31.3)	−10.6 (12.9)	−22.0 (−7.6)	−28.9 (−20.0)	−32.8 (−27.0)
Average precipitation mm (inches)	4.0 (0.16)	6.9 (0.27)	13.0 (0.51)	27.3 (1.07)	58.8 (2.31)	91.5 (3.60)	150.0 (5.91)	158.2 (6.23)	53.4 (2.10)	32.3 (1.27)	17.4 (0.69)	7.2 (0.28)	620 (24.4)
Average precipitation days (≥ 0.1 mm)	3.4	3.2	4.9	6.6	9.8	12.1	12.6	11.5	7.4	6.6	5.4	4.4	87.9
Average snowy days	6.8	5.7	5.6	2.1	0	0	0	0	0	1.1	5.4	7.8	34.5
Average relative humidity (%)	62	54	49	45	51	65	78	79	68	60	61	64	61
Mean monthly sunshine hours	192.0	205.0	241.6	240.7	264.7	246.7	225.0	228.4	238.8	214.0	171.3	167.6	2,635.8
Percentage possible sunshine	66	68	65	60	58	54	49	54	64	63	59	60	60
Source: China Meteorological Administration

== Economy ==
Changtu County's gross domestic product (GDP) reached a total of ¥13.32 billion in 2019, a 2.9% increase from the previous year. Of this, 46.5% came from the county's primary sector, 13.0% came from the secondary sector, and 40.5% came from the tertiary sector.

As of 2019, the average annual salary in Changtu County is ¥34,915, a 7.6% increase from the previous year. Urban unemployment in 2019 was 3.74%.

=== Agriculture and animal husbandry ===
The county's agriculture, forestry, animal husbandry, and fishing industries combined accounted for ¥13.87 billion of economic value in 2019. Agriculture in the county is dominated by the growing of maize, although the cultivation of seed oil, vegetables, soybeans, and rice are also substantial. Large amounts of swine, cattle, and poultry are raised in Changtu County. A smaller, yet substantial, amount of sheep are also raised.

=== Tourism ===
In 2019, 540,000 tourists visited Changtu County, generating revenue of ¥30 million.

== Education ==
As of 2019, the county reported having 98 public schools serving 66,397 students. The county has 187 kindergartens, including 44 public ones. There are 44 primary schools, 36 junior high schools, 5 nine-year schools, 3 high schools, as well as a number of vocational schools.

=== High schools ===
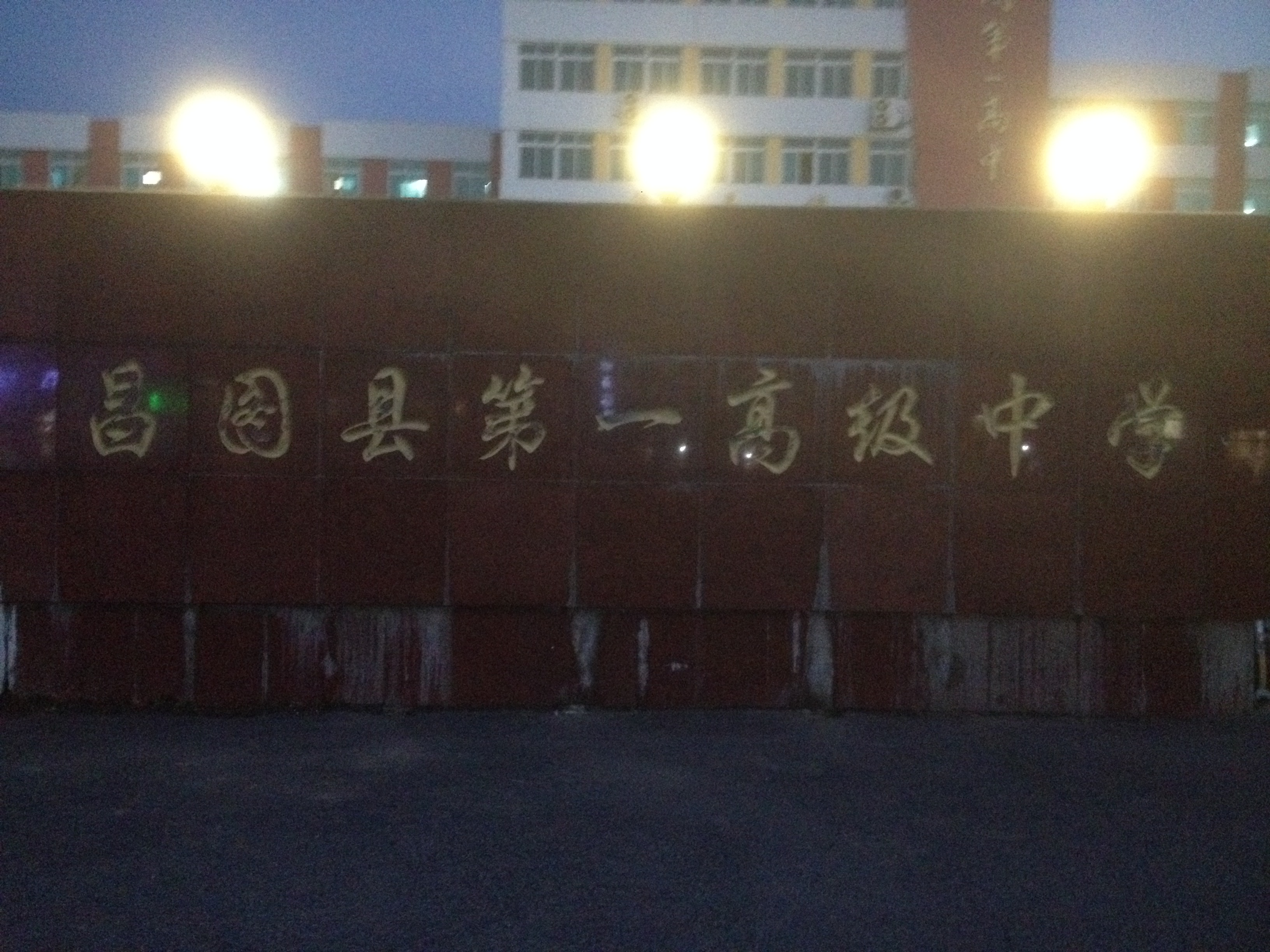
No.1 Senior High School, Changtu

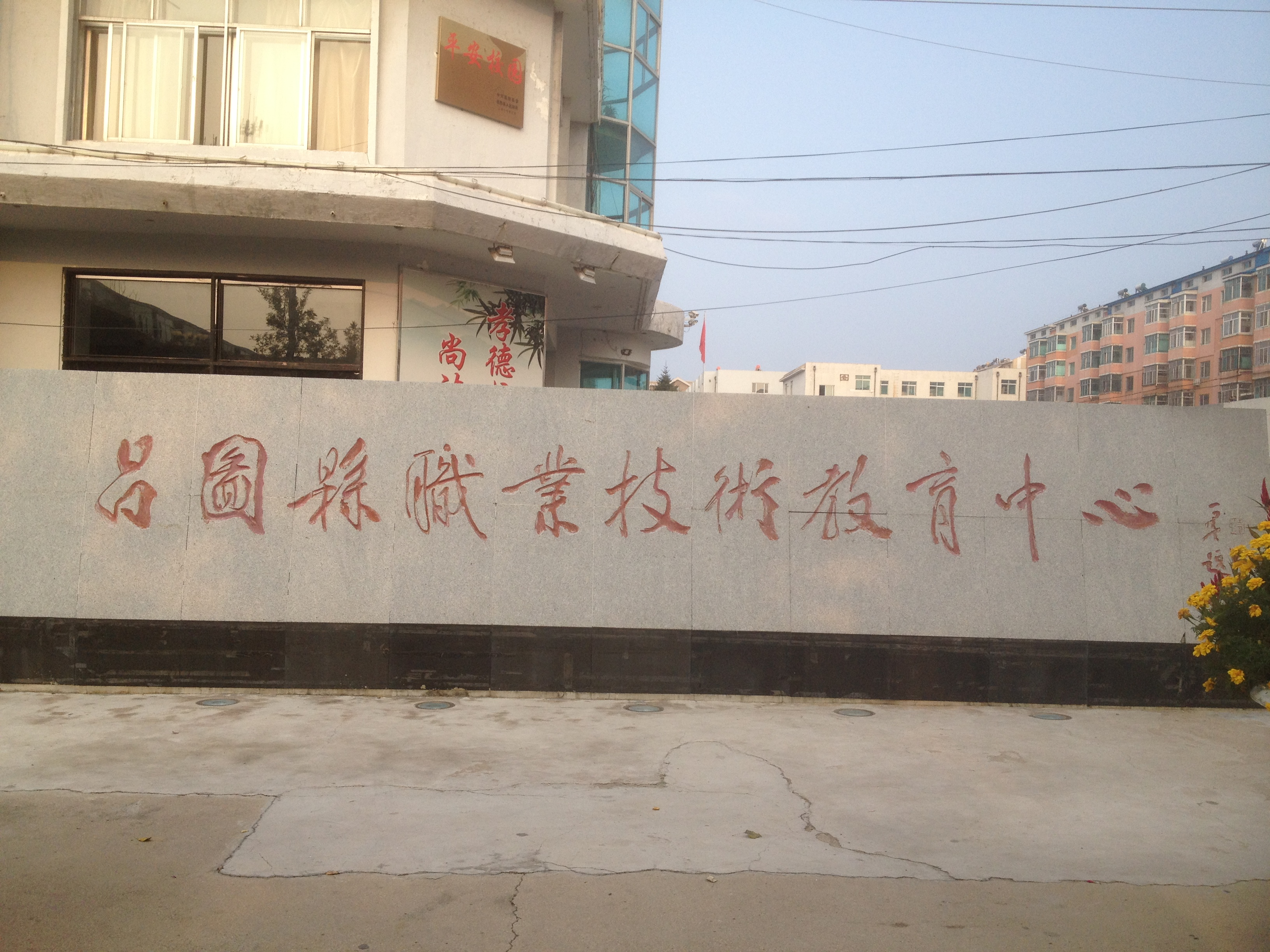
Changtu Vocational Education Center

One of the three high schools serving the county is Changtu No.1 Senior High, which has over 2,500 students. The school's campus covers an area of 90,600 square metres.

=== Middle schools ===
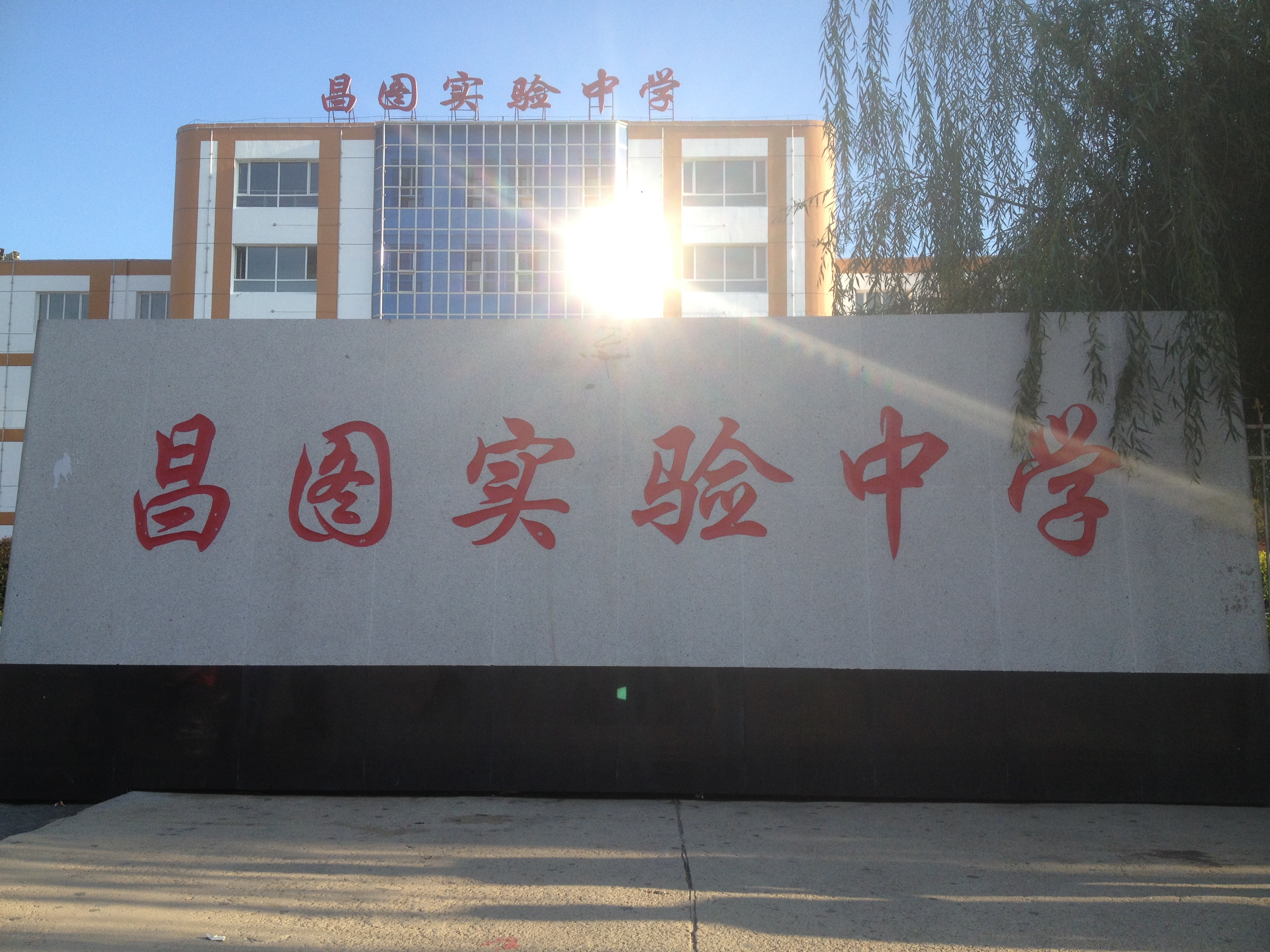
Shiyan Junior High School, Changtu

A school that is close to one-third the size of No.1 Senior High is Shiyan Junior High. This school covers about 28 kilometers squared.

== Healthcare ==
As of 2019, Changtu County has 36 medical institutions, which contain 3,845 hospital beds.
