= Hongqiao, Hebei =

Hongqiao 虹桥镇
- Town
- Location in Hebei
- Coordinates: 39°50′04″N 117°44′51″E
- Country: People's Republic of China
- Province: Hebei
- Prefecture-level city: Tangshan
- County: Yutian
- Village-level divisions: 17 villages
- Elevation: 9 m (30 ft)
- Time zone: UTC+8 (China Standard)
- Area code: 0315

Hongqiao (simplified Chinese: 虹桥; traditional Chinese: 虹橋; pinyin: Hóngqiáo; lit. 'rainbow bridge') is a town in Yutian County in northeastern Hebei province, China, located 42 kilometres (26 mi) northwest of downtown Tangshan. As of 2011, it has 17 villages under its administration.

== See also ==
- List of township-level divisions of Hebei
