= Jingshen Seafood Market =

Marketplace in Beijing

Jingshen Seafood Market or Chingshen Seafood Market (JSM; Chinese: 京深海鲜市场; pinyin: Jīngshēn Hǎixiān Shìchǎng) is a marketplace in the Fengtai district of Beijing.

== Synopsis ==
As with other marketplaces in China, wholesale and retail trade are both seen here, as well as restaurants. Jingshen is the largest seafood marketplace in Beijing. Tourists are advised to "keep expectations low in terms of a clean shopping environment as it can be a little messy in there" because "most sections of the market are devoted to large-scale, wholesale purchases". Retail vendors are located on "the first floor of a three-floor building located at the center" of the marketplace.

"The main areas of the JSM include six operating areas, including a seafood operating area, a frozen product operating area, an aquatic products trading hall, a dry goods seasoning operating area, a shell and crab operating area, and a car aquatic products trading area, and a supporting service area. There are about 800 booths."

== History ==
The JSM banned individual visitors from entering the market since the beginning of the Chinese Spring Festival 2020. "At present, the business hours of the merchants are from 4 am to 3 pm, and all are cleared at 3 am. Before the epidemic, the Beijing-Shenzhen Seafood Market had been open 24 hours," said one representative of the market. Clients "are called online to pick up the goods".

During week 20 of 2020, the JSM was shut down due to a new outbreak of COVID-19. The market was closed for disinfection on 12 June after it was found that a newly identified coronavirus patient had visited it.

Salmon from sushi restaurants was seen as a possible vector for transmission. The 52-branch Chaoshifa Market in Beijing said it had stopped selling salmon. Four out of every five of its branches sold salmon imported from Norway. Major supermarkets in Beijing including Carrefour and Wumart have stopped selling salmon. Alibaba’s Hema Fresh supermarket had also pulled the fish. Norway held a 45 percent share of market for fresh salmon in China from January to April 2020. Beijing airport was closed for "salmon flights" from 12 June.
