= Yutian County, Hebei =

Yutian County 玉田县 Yutien
- County
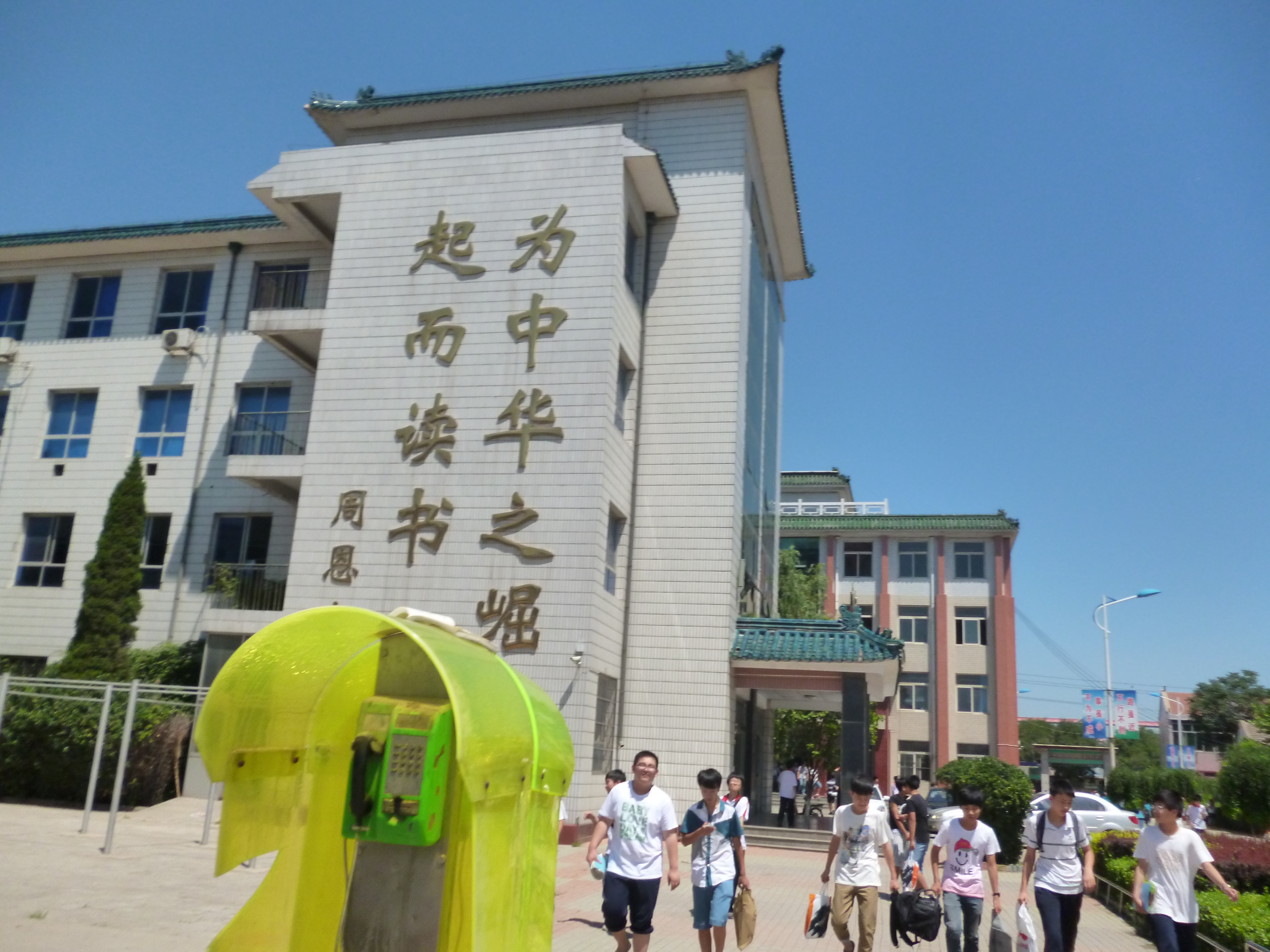
- Yutian No.3 Middle School

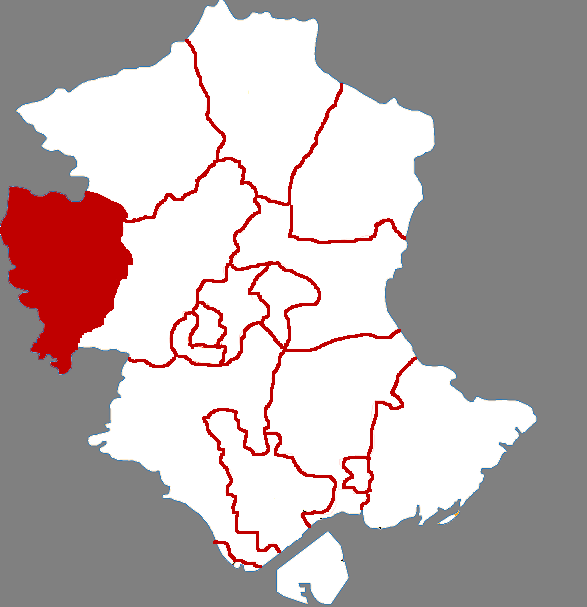
- Yutian in Tangshan

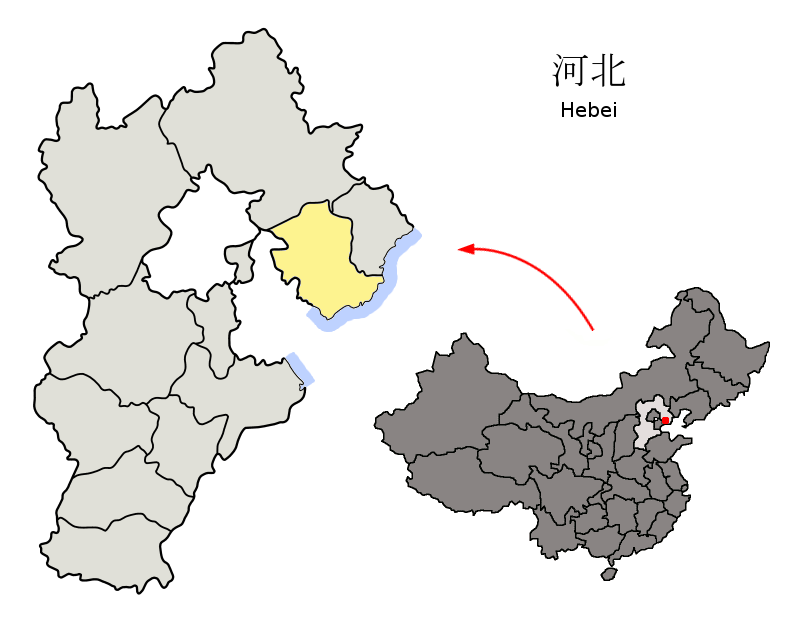
- Tangshan in Hebei
- Coordinates: 39°54′01″N 117°44′19″E
- Country: People's Republic of China
- Province: Hebei
- Prefecture-level city: Tangshan
- County seat: Yutian Town (玉田镇)

Area
  - Total: 1,169 km^{2} (451 sq mi)
- Elevation: 16 m (52 ft)

Population (2012)
  - Total: 690,000
  - Density: 590/km^{2} (1,500/sq mi)
- Time zone: UTC+8 (China Standard)

Yutian County (simplified Chinese: 玉田县; traditional Chinese: 玉田縣; pinyin: Yùtián Xiàn; lit. 'Jade Field County') is a county in the northeast of Hebei province, China, and is under the administration of the prefecture-level city of Tangshan, bordering Tianjin to the north and west. It is located approximately 55 kilometres (34 mi) northwest of Tangshan and 110 km (68 mi) east of Beijing, lying on China National Highway 102. It has an area of 1,169 km^{2} (451 sq mi), and as of 2012, a population of approximately 680,000.

== History ==
During the Spring and Autumn period, the area of present-day Yutian County belonged to the state of Wuzhong. During the Warring States period, it belonged to the state of Yan as part of Beiping Commandery. In the Qin dynasty, the area, which remained part of Beiping Commandery, was organized as Wuzhong County. During the Han dynasty, the area was split between Wuzhong County and Xuwu County (simplified Chinese: 徐无县; traditional Chinese: 徐無縣; pinyin: Xúwú Xiàn). Under the Northern Wei, Xuwu County was merged into Wuzhong County. During the Sui dynasty, Wuzhong County was renamed to Yuyang County (simplified Chinese: 渔阳县; traditional Chinese: 漁陽縣; pinyin: Yúyáng Xiàn).

In 619 CE, during the Tang dynasty, the eastern portion of Yuyang County was carved out into a new iteration of Wuzhong County. In 627 CE, Wuzhong County was once again abolished, and merged back into Yuyang County. In 667 CE, Wuzhong County was once again re-established, and placed under the jurisdiction of Youzhou. In 696 CE, Wuzhong County was renamed to Yutian County (simplified Chinese: 玉田县; traditional Chinese: 玉田縣; pinyin: Yùtián Xiàn). In 705 CE, Yutian County was placed under the jurisdiction of Yingzhou. Throughout the following decades, the area was transferred back and forth between Youzhou and Yingzhou several times, before being placed under Jizhou in 730 CE.

Later, during the Liao dynasty, the area was placed under the jurisdiction of Xijin Fu. In 1124, the area was placed under the jurisdiction of Yanshanfu Circuit, and the following year, Yutian County was transferred again to Daxing Fu. During the Jin dynasty, during the final years of Emperor Zhangzong of Jin, the eastern portion of Yutian County was split off as Fengrun County (simplified Chinese: 丰闰县; traditional Chinese: 豐閏縣; pinyin: Fēngrùn Xiàn). In 1265, Fengrun County was abolished, and merged back into Yutian County. The reunified Yutian County would shortly after be placed under the jurisdiction of Dadu Circuit.

During the Ming dynasty, Yutian County was under the jurisdiction of Jizhou throughout. In 1725, during the Qing dynasty, Yutian County was reassigned to fall under the jurisdiction of Yongping Fu. In 1743, it was reassigned once again to Zunhua Prefecture.

In 1913, under the Republic of China, prefectures were abolished and replaced with circuits, and Yutian County was placed under the newly-formed Jinhai Circuit. In 1928, circuits would be abolished, and the area would be placed directly under the jurisdiction of Hebei province.

Yutian County was placed under the administration of Tangshan in 1949. In May 1983, Tangshan was upgraded from a prefecture to a prefecture-level city.

== Geography ==
Yutian County's elevation is generally higher in the north, which sits at the southern foothills of the Yanshan Mountains, and lower in the south. The Ji Canal River runs through the county, as does the Huanxiang River.

=== Climate ===
Climate data for Yutian, elevation 18 m (59 ft), (1991–2020 normals, extremes 1981–2010)
Month	Jan	Feb	Mar	Apr	May	Jun	Jul	Aug	Sep	Oct	Nov	Dec	Year
Record high °C (°F)	13.2 (55.8)	19.7 (67.5)	27.5 (81.5)	32.4 (90.3)	37.9 (100.2)	38.8 (101.8)	39.7 (103.5)	35.4 (95.7)	34.7 (94.5)	30.5 (86.9)	21.2 (70.2)	13.6 (56.5)	39.7 (103.5)
Mean daily maximum °C (°F)	1.8 (35.2)	5.8 (42.4)	12.8 (55.0)	20.5 (68.9)	26.6 (79.9)	30.2 (86.4)	31.5 (88.7)	30.5 (86.9)	26.5 (79.7)	19.3 (66.7)	10.1 (50.2)	3.2 (37.8)	18.2 (64.8)
Daily mean °C (°F)	−4.7 (23.5)	−0.9 (30.4)	6.2 (43.2)	14.0 (57.2)	20.1 (68.2)	24.3 (75.7)	26.5 (79.7)	25.4 (77.7)	20.3 (68.5)	12.5 (54.5)	3.8 (38.8)	−2.8 (27.0)	12.1 (53.7)
Mean daily minimum °C (°F)	−9.9 (14.2)	−6.5 (20.3)	0.0 (32.0)	7.4 (45.3)	13.3 (55.9)	18.6 (65.5)	22.2 (72.0)	20.9 (69.6)	14.8 (58.6)	6.8 (44.2)	−1.3 (29.7)	−7.5 (18.5)	6.6 (43.8)
Record low °C (°F)	−21.0 (−5.8)	−18.1 (−0.6)	−10.7 (12.7)	−2.0 (28.4)	4.7 (40.5)	10.1 (50.2)	16.3 (61.3)	12.4 (54.3)	5.1 (41.2)	−4.0 (24.8)	−11.7 (10.9)	−16.2 (2.8)	−21.0 (−5.8)
Average precipitation mm (inches)	2.7 (0.11)	3.8 (0.15)	7.0 (0.28)	22.4 (0.88)	38.0 (1.50)	86.1 (3.39)	186.4 (7.34)	140.0 (5.51)	60.4 (2.38)	28.1 (1.11)	13.3 (0.52)	3.2 (0.13)	591.4 (23.3)
Average precipitation days (≥ 0.1 mm)	1.7	2.1	2.9	4.7	6.1	9.8	12.8	9.8	6.6	4.9	3.3	2.3	67
Average snowy days	3.4	2.7	1.1	0.1	0	0	0	0	0	0.1	1.7	3.1	12.2
Average relative humidity (%)	51	49	45	47	54	63	74	77	71	67	62	56	60
Mean monthly sunshine hours	172.0	176.3	224.5	233.5	260.6	216.3	180.0	198.4	204.5	194.8	161.3	159.9	2,382.1
Percentage possible sunshine	57	58	60	58	58	48	40	47	55	57	54	55	54
Source: China Meteorological Administration

== Administrative divisions ==
Yutian County administers 1 subdistrict, 17 towns, 3 townships, and 2 other township-level divisions.

The county's sole subdistrict is Wuzhong Subdistrict, which hosts the county's seat of government.

The county's 17 towns are Yutian, Liangjiadian, Yahongqiao, Woluogu, Shijiuwo, Hongqiao, Sanshuitou, Linnancang, Linxi, Yangjiabanqiao, Caitingqiao, Gushu, Da'anzhen, Tangzitou, Guojiatun, Yangjiatao, and Chenjiapu.

The county's 3 townships are Lintoutun Township, Chaoluowo Township, and Guojiaqiao Township.

The county also administers the township-level divisions of the Hebei Yutian Economic Development Zone (Chinese: 河北玉田经济开发区) and the Hebei Tangshan National Agricultural Technology Park (Chinese: 河北唐山国家农业科技园区).

== Demographics ==
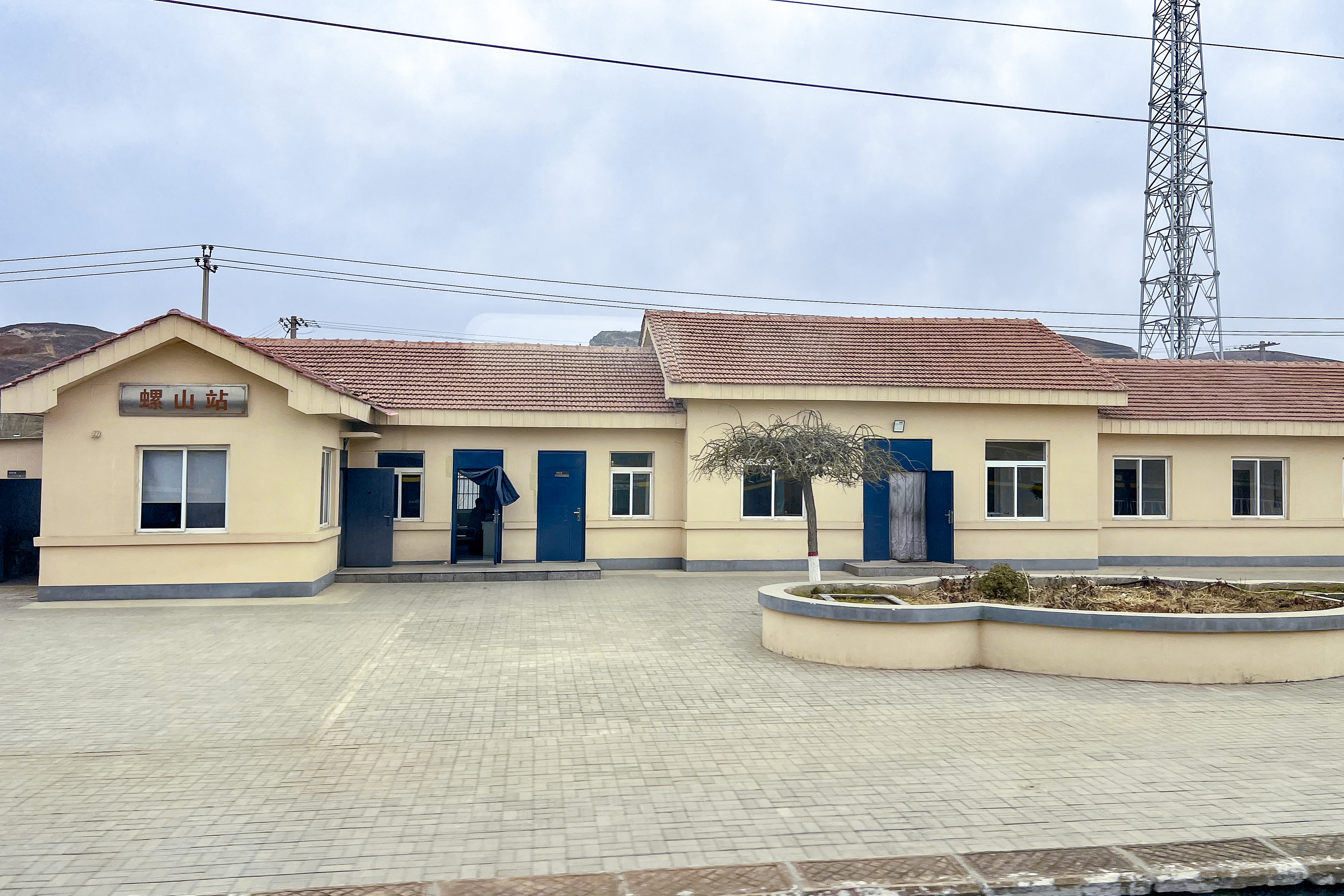
Luoshan railway station

A 2012 estimate put the county's population at approximately 680,000. Per the 2010 Chinese census, Yutian County had a population of 684,833. A 2002 estimate pegged the county's population at about 650,500. The 2000 Chinese census recorded the county's population at 650,408.

== Economy ==
Yutian County has significant deposits of coal, limestone, and dolomite.

== Culture ==
Jingjue Temple, which dates back to the Tang dynasty, is located within Yutian County.

== Transportation ==
The Beijing–Qinhuangdao railway and the Datong–Qinhuangdao railway both run through Yutian County. China National Highway 102 also runs through Yutian County.
