= China National Highway 102 =

Road in China

National Highway 102
- 102国道

Route information
- Length: 2,897 km (1,800 mi)

Major junctions
- From: Beijing
- To: Fuyuan, Heilongjiang

Location
- Country: China
- Major cities: Hebei, Liaoning, Jilin, Heilongjiang

Highway system
- National Trunk Highway System; Primary; Auxiliary
← G101	→ G103

China National Highway 102 is a major trunk route connecting Beijing to Fuyuan, Heilongjiang. In Beijing it is known as Jingfu Road (京抚路), after the two cities' names, for connecting Beijing to Fuyuan.

It leaves Beijing as the Jingtong Expressway and Tongzhou–Yanjiao Expressway into Hebei Province (they are rare occurrences that sections of National Highways are built to National Expressway standards). It then runs alongside the Beijing–Shenyang Expressway along the coast until Shenyang, Liaoning, and then along the Shenyang–Harbin Expressway until Harbin.

China National Highway 102 was 1,297 km (806 mi) in length. It runs through the provinces of Hebei, Liaoning, Jilin and Heilongjiang. It connects the major cities of Qinhuangdao, Shenyang, Changchun and Harbin. In 2013, under a new 2013-2030 plan by NDRC and MoT, the G102 was extended to Fuyuan.

== Route and distance ==
Route and distance

City	Distance (km)
Beijing, Beijing	0
Sanhe, Hebei	64
Ji County, Tianjin	87
Yutian County, Hebei	124
Fengrun, Hebei	157
Lulong, Hebei	224
Funing County, Hebei	257
Shanhaiguan, Hebei	306
Suizhong, Liaoning	371
Xingcheng, Liaoning	418
Lianshan District, Liaoning	442
Jinzhou, Liaoning	502
Linghai, Liaoning	526
Beizhen, Liaoning	604
Heishan, Liaoning	635
Xinmin, Liaoning	709
Shenyang, Liaoning	777
Xinchengzi District, Liaoning	806
Tieling, Liaoning	853
Kaiyuan, Liaoning	885
Changtu, Liaoning	918
Siping, Jilin	985
Gongzhuling, Jilin	1032
Changchun, Jilin	1091
Shuangcheng, Heilongjiang	1297

== See also ==
- China National Highways
- AH1
