= G25 Changchun–Shenzhen Expressway =

Expressway in China

Changchun–Shenzhen Expressway
- 长春－深圳高速公路
- Changshen Expressway 长深高速公路

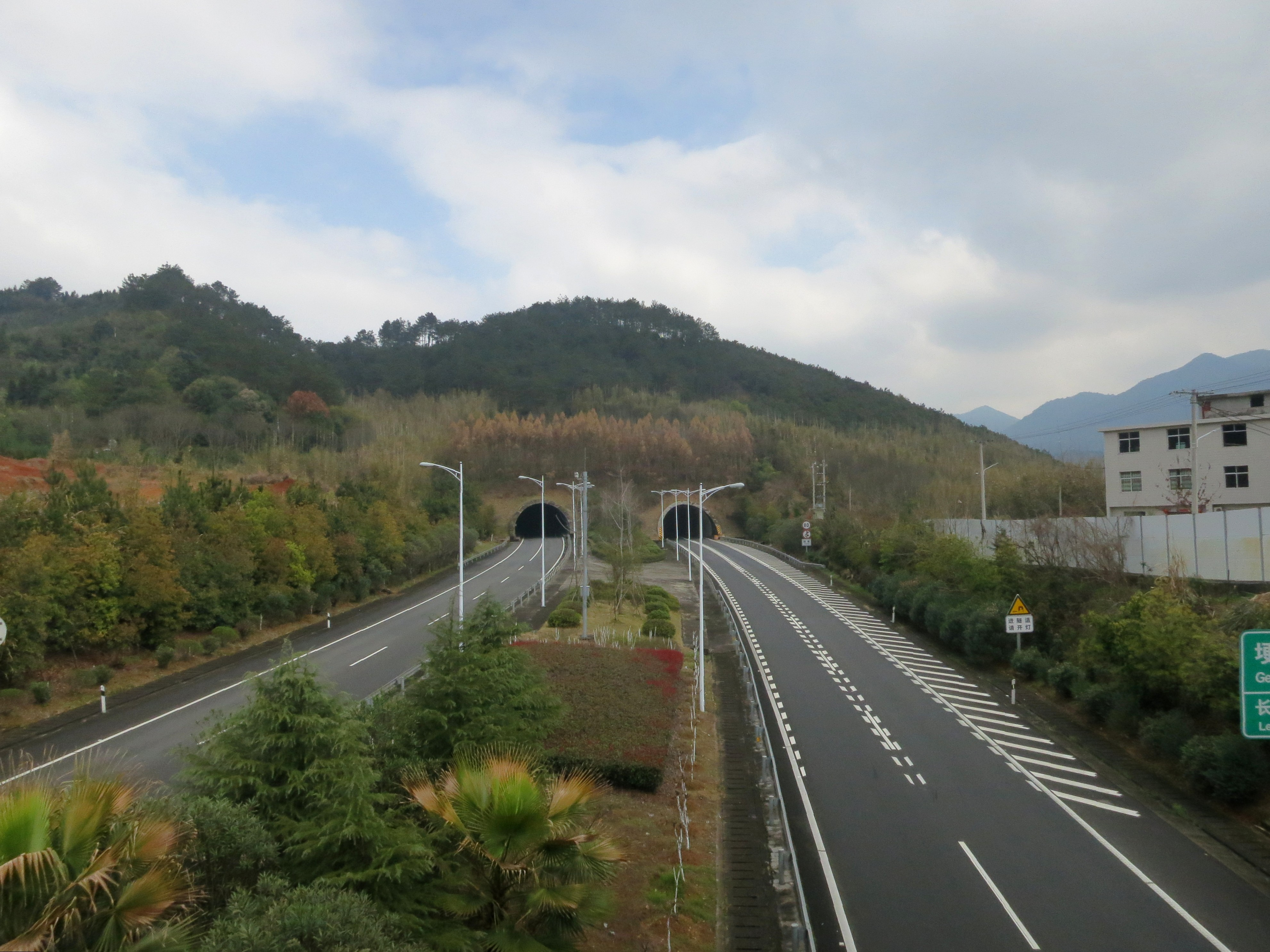
- An section of the Changchun–Shenzhen Expressway in Nanping, Fujian

Route information
- Length: 3,585 km (2,228 mi) Length when complete.

Major junctions
- North end: G1 / G2501 in Changchun, Jilin
- South end: Guangdong S30 / Guangdong S360 in Shenzhen, Guangdong

Location
- Country: China

Highway system
- National Trunk Highway System; Primary; Auxiliary; National Highways; Transport in China
← G2211	→ G2501

The Changchun–Shenzhen Expressway (Chinese: 长春—深圳高速公路), designated as G25 and commonly referred to as the Changshen Expressway (Chinese: 长深高速公路), is an expressway that connects the cities of Changchun, Jilin, China, and Shenzhen, Guangdong. When complete, it will be 3,585 km (2,228 mi) in length.

Section from Jiande, Zhejiang to Jinhua are not constructed yet.

China Expwy G25 sign with name

China Expwy G25 sign no name

== Tangjin Expressway ==
Tangjin Expressway
- Tángjīn Gāosù Gōnglù 唐津高速公路
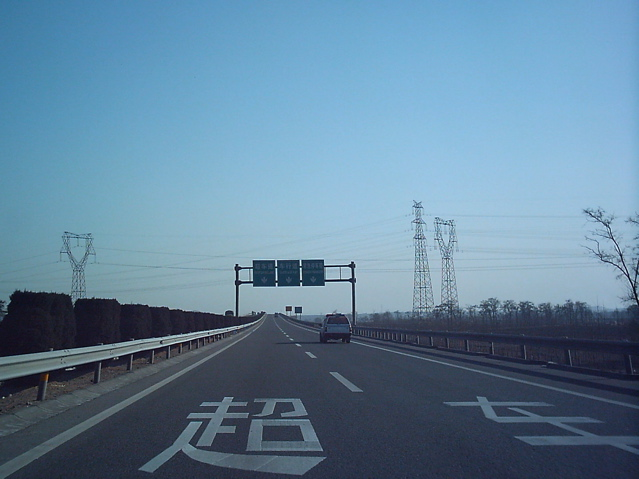

Major junctions
- From: Tangshan, Hebei
- To: Outer Ring Road, Tianjin

Location
- Country: China
- Major cities: Hebei, Tianjin

Highway system
- Transport in China

The Tangjin Expressway (唐津) is an expressway and auxiliary route of the G25 in China which links Tangshan in Hebei province to Tianjin.

The Tangjin Expressway gets its name by the combination of two one-character Chinese abbreviations of both Tangshan and Tianjin (Tangshan—Tang, Tianjin—Jin).

=== Speed Limit ===
Maximum speed limit of 110 km/h.

=== Tolls ===
Approximately CNY 0.4 per kilometre.

=== Lanes ===
6 lanes (3 up, 3 down) and 4 lanes (2 up, 2 down) interchangeably.

=== Major Exits ===
Hebei Section: Tangshan
Tianjin Section: Jingjintang Expressway, Jinghu Expressway, Tianjin

=== Service Areas ===
Hebei Section: Tangshan
Tianjin Section: A service area is under projection and construction is expected at Hangu.

=== Connections ===
Jingjintang Expressway: Connects at Tanggu West

== List of exits ==
Symbols: ↗ = exit; ⇆ = main interchange; S = service area; ¥ = central toll gate

=== Tianjin section ===
Expressway begins at the intersection with the Jingshen Expressway

- ⇆ (Interchange with the Jingshen Expressway)
- ↗ 1: Tangshan East, Guye District
- ⇆ 2: (Interchange with the Tanggang Expressway) Kaiping District, Jinggang Port
- S Tangshan
- ↗ 3: Tangshan South, Tanghai
- ↗ 4: Fengnan District
- ⇆ 5: (Interchange with the China National Highway 205) China National Highway 205
- ¥ Tianjin/Hebei provincial boundary
- ↗ 6: Hangu Farm
- ✕ Hangu Service Area under construction
- ↗ 7: Ninghe, Lutai
- ↗ 8: Hangu District
- ↗ 9: Qinghe Farm
- ⇆ 10: (Interchange with the Jingjintang Expressway) Tianjin, Tanggu

...

Expressway ends at the Outer Ring Road (Tianjin)

== Provincial Sections ==
The Ministry of Transport of the People's Republic of China has initiated a nationwide standardization of highway naming and numbering. Expressways incorporated into the National Trunk Highway System will gradually adopt new names to replace old ones. Below is a reference to the former names of different sections along the route.

=== Jilin Section ===
- Fully operational.
- Changchun to Shuangliao Expressway: This section begins at West Fourth Ring Road in Changchun, intersecting with the Changchun Ring Expressway. It passes through Daling, Huaide, Qinjia Tun, Bawu, Shiwu, Sangshutai, and Shuangshan, ending at Dafu Interchange in Shuangliao, where it connects to the Daguang Expressway.
- The total length of this section is 124.681 km, and the construction included roadbed, pavement, bridges, safety facilities, landscaping, environmental protection, buildings, and electrical systems.
- Construction started in April 2013, with land acquisition and major works completed by 2014. The Daling to Shuangliao segment (118.5 km) was completed and opened in 2015, and the entire section was fully operational by November 30, 2017.

=== Inner Mongolia Section ===
- Fully operational.

=== Liaoning Section ===
- Fully operational: (Jilin border) → Shen-Kang Expressway (Phase III) → Kangping → Tie-Fu Expressway (Kangping–Fuxin section) → Fuxin → Fu-Chao Expressway → Chaoyang → Cheng-Chao Expressway → (Hebei border).
- The third phase of the Shen-Kang Expressway spans 23.73 km and was opened on July 6, 2015.

=== Hebei Section A ===
- Fully operational: (Liaoning border) → Cheng-Chao Expressway → Chengde → Cheng-Tang Expressway → Tangshan → Tang-Jin Expressway → (Tianjin border).
- Chengde–Tangshan (Cheng-Tang Expressway):
  - Total length: 125.934 km
  - Design speed: 80 km/h
  - First six-lane mountainous expressway in Hebei province, with bridges and tunnels comprising over 40% of the route.
  - The Chengde section (82.3 km) starts in Shuangluan District, linking with Beijing-Chengde Expressway, passing through Anjiang, Liuzhangzi, Lijiaying, Miaojiaying, Baimachuan, Anziling, Banbishan, Wangzhangzi, and ending at Cheng-Tang border with Tangshan.
  - The Tangshan section (43.655 km) was completed in two phases:
    - Phase 1: Fengrun District to Zunhua Nanxiaoying (opened in 2007).
    - Phase 2: Extends from Nanxiaoying through Datangyu, Qianlihetian, Houjiazai to Ganzhayu at the Tangshan-Chengde border, crossing several railway lines and national highways.
    - The expressway includes 4 interchanges, 16 grade-separated crossings, 29 bridges, 1 tunnel, a main toll station, and a service area.

=== Tianjin Section ===
- Fully operational: (Hebei border) → Tang-Jin Expressway → Jin-Shan Expressway → (Hebei border).

=== Hebei Section B ===
- Fully operational: Merged with G18 Rongwu Expressway → (Tianjin border) → Jin-Shan Expressway → (Shandong border).

=== Shandong Section ===
- Fully operational.
- Lianyungang–Linyi (Lianlin Expressway):
  - Begins at the Jiangsu-Shandong border (south of Anti-Japanese Mountain in Ganyu County) and connects to the Shandong section of G25 Changshen Expressway in Linyi.
  - Ends at Songtiao, connecting to Ninglian Expressway.
  - The total length is 55.698 km, including a 4.294 km port connection road.
  - Opened in November 2010.

=== Jiangsu Section ===
- Fully operational.

=== Zhejiang Section ===
- Fully operational.
- Key expressways forming this section:
  - Ning-Hang Expressway
  - Hangzhou Ring Expressway
  - Hang-Xin-Jing Expressway
  - Lin-Jin Expressway
  - Jin-Li-Wen Expressway
  - Li-Long-Qing Expressway

=== Fujian Section ===
- Fully operational.
- Key expressways forming this section:
  - Song-Jian Expressway
  - Pu-Nan Expressway
  - San-Fu Expressway
  - Quan-San Expressway
  - Yong-Wu Expressway

=== Guangdong Section ===
- Fully operational, except for the section between Jinqian'ao Interchange and Wutong Interchange.
- Key expressways forming this section:
  - Tian-Shan Expressway
  - Meizhou Ring Expressway
  - Mei-He Expressway
  - He-Long Expressway
  - Yue-Gan Expressway
  - Hui-He Expressway
  - Hui-Yan Expressway
  - Ji-He Expressway
  - Yan-Pai Expressway
