= Funing District =

Funing 抚宁区
- District
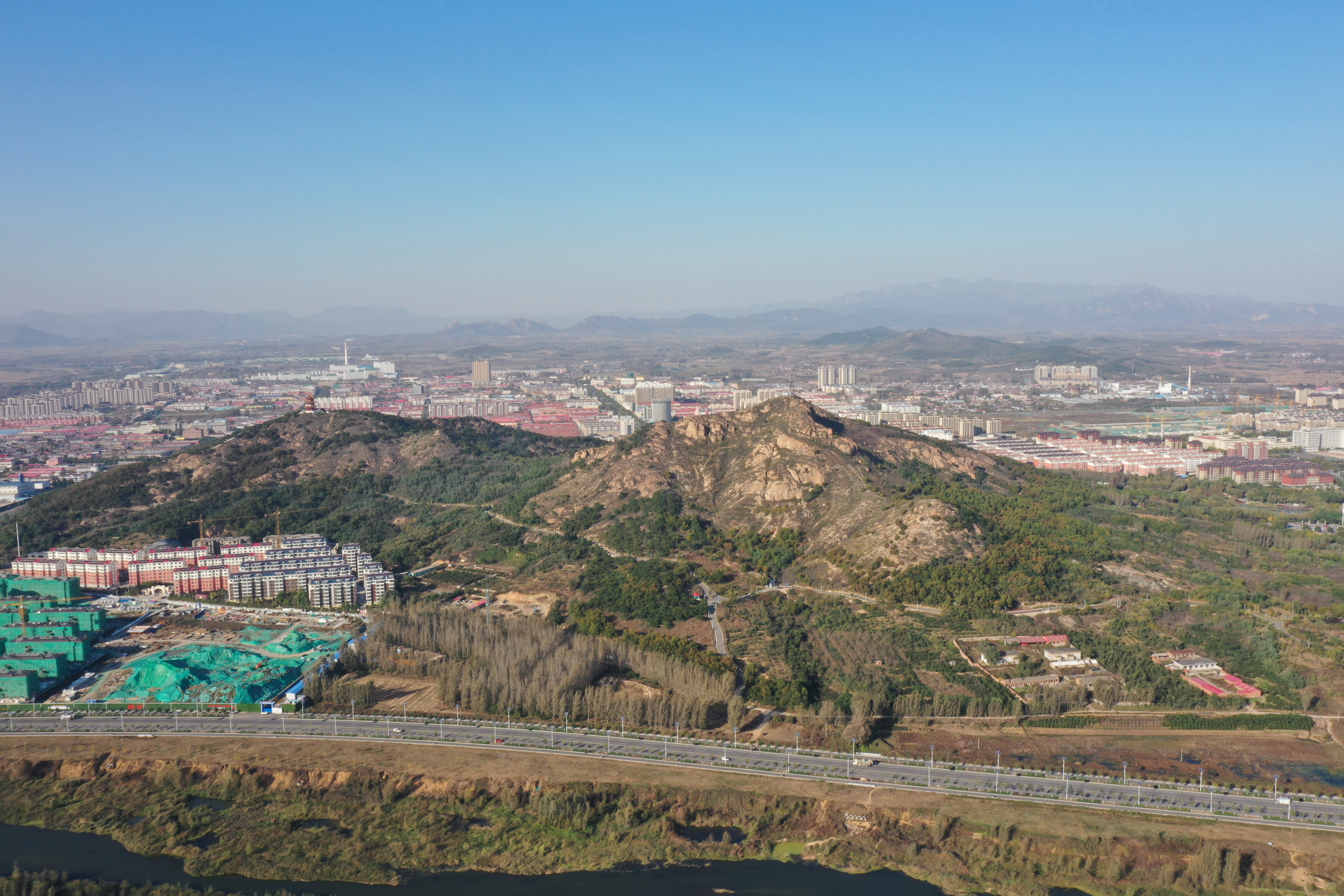

- Location in Hebei
- Coordinates: 39°53′N 119°15′E
- Country: People's Republic of China
- Province: Hebei
- Prefecture-level city: Qinhuangdao
- County seat: Licheng Subdistrict (骊城街道)

Area
  - Total: 1,618 km^{2} (625 sq mi)
- Elevation: 21 m (69 ft)

Population (2020 census)
  - Total: 291,211
  - Density: 180.0/km^{2} (466.2/sq mi)
- Time zone: UTC+8 (China Standard)
- Postal code: 066300
- Area code: 0335
- Website: www.chinafuning.gov.cn

Funing District (simplified Chinese: 抚宁区; traditional Chinese: 撫寧區; pinyin: Fǔníng Qū) is a district of northeastern Hebei Province, China, located about 30 km (19 mi) to the west of Qinhuangdao, which administers it. As of 2020, it had a population of 291,211 residing in an area of 1,646 km^{2} (636 sq mi).

== Administrative divisions ==
The district administers 2 subdistricts, 5 towns and 2 townships.

Subdistricts:

- Licheng Subdistrict (骊城街道), Nandaihe Subdistrict (南戴河街道)

Towns:

- Funing (抚宁镇), Liushouying (留守营镇), Yuguan (榆关镇), Taiying (台营镇), Daxinzhai (大新寨镇)

Townships:

- Chapeng Township (茶棚乡), Shenhe Township (深河乡)

== Climate ==
Climate data for Funing, elevation 24 m (79 ft), (1991–2020 normals, extremes 1981–present)
Month	Jan	Feb	Mar	Apr	May	Jun	Jul	Aug	Sep	Oct	Nov	Dec	Year
Record high °C (°F)	11.6 (52.9)	18.4 (65.1)	28.3 (82.9)	32.3 (90.1)	37.2 (99.0)	40.2 (104.4)	38.9 (102.0)	37.5 (99.5)	34.9 (94.8)	31.3 (88.3)	21.9 (71.4)	13.5 (56.3)	40.2 (104.4)
Mean daily maximum °C (°F)	0.8 (33.4)	4.5 (40.1)	11.2 (52.2)	19.0 (66.2)	25.2 (77.4)	28.1 (82.6)	29.9 (85.8)	29.8 (85.6)	26.3 (79.3)	19.1 (66.4)	9.7 (49.5)	2.6 (36.7)	17.2 (62.9)
Daily mean °C (°F)	−4.9 (23.2)	−1.6 (29.1)	4.9 (40.8)	12.8 (55.0)	19.2 (66.6)	22.9 (73.2)	25.6 (78.1)	25.0 (77.0)	20.4 (68.7)	12.9 (55.2)	4.3 (39.7)	−2.5 (27.5)	11.6 (52.8)
Mean daily minimum °C (°F)	−9.3 (15.3)	−6.2 (20.8)	0.0 (32.0)	7.4 (45.3)	13.8 (56.8)	18.6 (65.5)	22.0 (71.6)	21.2 (70.2)	15.6 (60.1)	8.0 (46.4)	0.1 (32.2)	−6.5 (20.3)	7.1 (44.7)
Record low °C (°F)	−25.5 (−13.9)	−19.6 (−3.3)	−11.9 (10.6)	−4.7 (23.5)	4.1 (39.4)	10.0 (50.0)	15.5 (59.9)	13.7 (56.7)	2.4 (36.3)	−5.5 (22.1)	−16.9 (1.6)	−19.3 (−2.7)	−25.5 (−13.9)
Average precipitation mm (inches)	3.0 (0.12)	4.0 (0.16)	8.0 (0.31)	25.3 (1.00)	45.3 (1.78)	91.9 (3.62)	191.3 (7.53)	158.0 (6.22)	49.8 (1.96)	31.0 (1.22)	14.4 (0.57)	3.8 (0.15)	625.8 (24.64)
Average precipitation days (≥ 0.1 mm)	1.9	2.3	2.9	5.2	7.0	9.7	11.6	9.8	6.6	4.4	3.5	2.3	67.2
Average snowy days	3.0	2.6	1.4	0.3	0	0	0	0	0	0.1	1.6	2.9	11.9
Average relative humidity (%)	52	51	49	49	54	69	79	78	70	62	57	54	60
Mean monthly sunshine hours	193.9	196.5	241.6	248.8	274.1	231.3	195.5	215.0	228.4	216.2	178.7	181.7	2,601.7
Percentage possible sunshine	64	65	65	62	61	52	43	51	62	63	60	63	59
Source: China Meteorological Administrationall-time February highall-time August highOctober all-time Record

== Transport ==
- China National Highway 102
- China National Highway 205
- Beijing–Harbin Railway
- Beijing–Qinhuangdao Railway
- Datong–Qinhuangdao Railway
- G1 Beijing–Harbin Expressway
