= Shuangcheng, Harbin =

Shuangcheng 双城区
- District
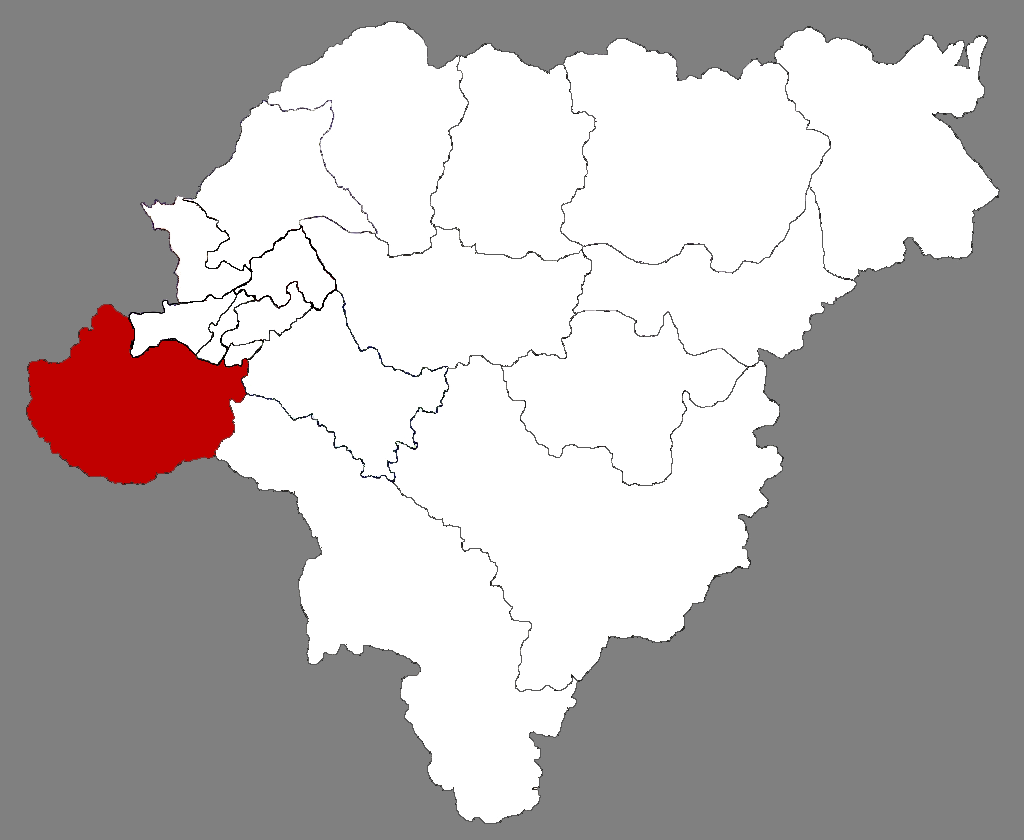
- Location of Shuangcheng in Harbin

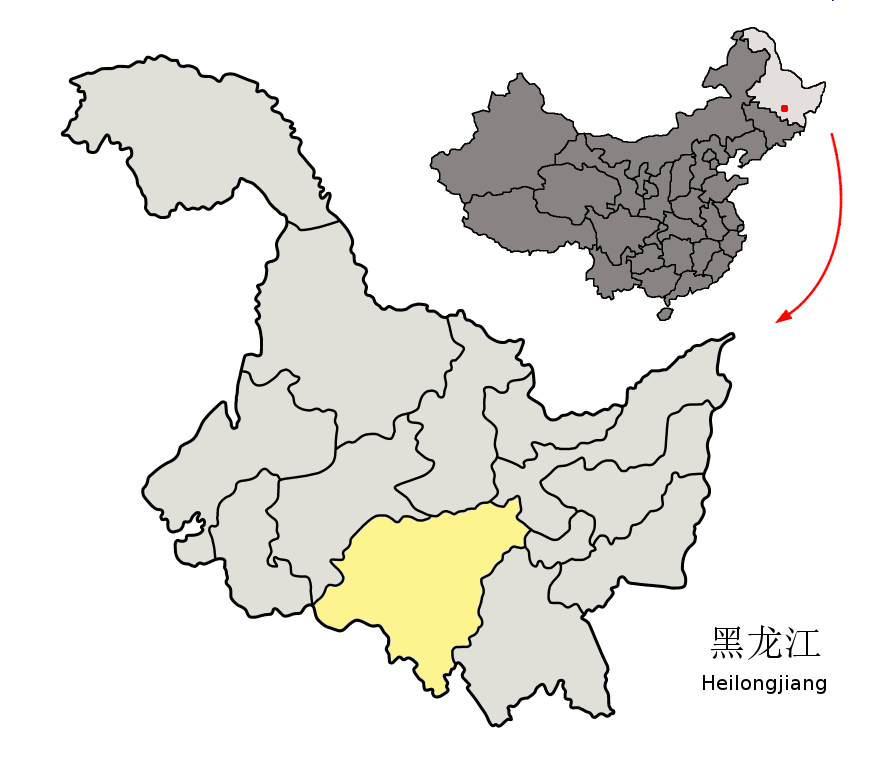
- Harbin in Heilongjiang
- Coordinates: 45°23′04″N 126°20′56″E
- Country: People's Republic of China
- Province: Heilongjiang
- Sub-provincial city: Harbin

Area
  - Total: 3,112.0 km^{2} (1,201.5 sq mi)

Population (2019)
  - Total: 766,316
  - Density: 246.25/km^{2} (637.77/sq mi)
- Time zone: UTC+8 (China Standard)
- Postal code: 1501XX
- Area code: 0451
- Website: hrbsc.gov.cn

Shuangcheng District (simplified Chinese: 双城区; traditional Chinese: 雙城區; pinyin: Shuāngchéng Qū) is one of nine districts of the prefecture-level city of Harbin, the capital of Heilongjiang Province, Northeast China, covering part of the southwestern suburbs. The district was approved to establish from the former Shuangcheng City (双城市) by the Chinese State Council on May 2, 2014. It sits approximately 42 kilometres (26 mi) south-southwest of downtown Harbin. Formerly a county-level city until 15 May 2014. The westernmost county-level division of Harbin City, it borders Daoli District to the north, Nangang and Pingfang Districts to the northeast, Acheng District to the east, and Wuchang to the southeast, as well as the Jilin prefecture-level divisions of Changchun to the south and Songyuan to the southwest.

== Administrative divisions ==
Shuangcheng District is divided into 10 subdistricts, 8 towns, 1 ethnic town, 4 townships and 4 ethnic townships.

10 subdistricts

- Wujia (五家街道), Xinxing (新兴街道), Lanleng (兰棱街道), Zhoujia (周家街道), Gongzheng (公正街道), Chengxu (承旭街道), Cheng'en (承恩街道), Yongzhi (永治街道), Yonghe (永和街道), Xingfu (幸福街道)

8 towns

- Handian (韩甸镇), Dancheng (单城镇), Dongguan (东官镇), Xingshan (杏山镇), Xiguan (西官镇), Lianxing (联兴镇), Yongsheng (永胜镇), Shengfeng (胜丰镇)

1 ethnic town

- Nongfeng Manchu and Xibe (农丰满族锡伯族镇)

4 townships

- Jincheng (金城乡), Linjiang (临江乡), Shuiquan (水泉乡), Wanlong (万隆乡)

4 ethnic townships

- Qingling Manchu (青岭满族乡), Lequn Manchu (乐群满族乡), Xiqin Manchu (希勤满族乡), Tongxin Manchu (同心满族乡)

== Climate ==
Climate data for Shuangcheng, elevation 168 m (551 ft), (1991–2020 normals, extremes 1991–present)
Month	Jan	Feb	Mar	Apr	May	Jun	Jul	Aug	Sep	Oct	Nov	Dec	Year
Record high °C (°F)	2.5 (36.5)	10.9 (51.6)	23.3 (73.9)	34.6 (94.3)	37.5 (99.5)	38.9 (102.0)	35.9 (96.6)	34.7 (94.5)	30.8 (87.4)	28.0 (82.4)	18.5 (65.3)	7.8 (46.0)	38.9 (102.0)
Mean daily maximum °C (°F)	−11.8 (10.8)	−5.8 (21.6)	3.4 (38.1)	14.2 (57.6)	21.7 (71.1)	26.7 (80.1)	28.1 (82.6)	26.7 (80.1)	21.7 (71.1)	12.7 (54.9)	0.2 (32.4)	−9.6 (14.7)	10.7 (51.3)
Daily mean °C (°F)	−17.4 (0.7)	−12.0 (10.4)	−2.5 (27.5)	7.9 (46.2)	15.7 (60.3)	21.3 (70.3)	23.5 (74.3)	21.8 (71.2)	15.6 (60.1)	6.6 (43.9)	−4.9 (23.2)	−14.7 (5.5)	5.1 (41.1)
Mean daily minimum °C (°F)	−22.2 (−8.0)	−17.7 (0.1)	−8.1 (17.4)	1.6 (34.9)	9.6 (49.3)	15.9 (60.6)	19.0 (66.2)	17.2 (63.0)	9.9 (49.8)	1.3 (34.3)	−9.3 (15.3)	−19.1 (−2.4)	−0.2 (31.7)
Record low °C (°F)	−38.0 (−36.4)	−37.7 (−35.9)	−29.3 (−20.7)	−11.4 (11.5)	−1.2 (29.8)	5.0 (41.0)	9.5 (49.1)	6.0 (42.8)	−2.9 (26.8)	−16.3 (2.7)	−27.6 (−17.7)	−33.7 (−28.7)	−38.0 (−36.4)
Average precipitation mm (inches)	3.2 (0.13)	3.8 (0.15)	8.4 (0.33)	14.6 (0.57)	56.0 (2.20)	101.7 (4.00)	124.4 (4.90)	112.0 (4.41)	53.4 (2.10)	22.2 (0.87)	12.6 (0.50)	6.8 (0.27)	519.1 (20.43)
Average precipitation days (≥ 0.1 mm)	4.1	3.2	5.0	6.1	10.6	13.6	13.7	12.4	9.0	6.4	5.3	5.5	94.9
Average snowy days	6.6	4.8	5.9	2.0	0.2	0	0	0	0	1.7	6.3	8.0	35.5
Average relative humidity (%)	71	65	54	47	52	64	77	78	69	61	65	71	65
Mean monthly sunshine hours	197.4	215.3	251.6	244.4	260.8	258.2	237.8	229.7	243.5	212.8	178.5	176.4	2,706.4
Percentage possible sunshine	69	73	68	60	56	55	51	53	66	64	63	65	62
Source: China Meteorological Administration
