= List of diglossic regions =

Diglossia refers to the use by a language community of two languages or dialects, a "high" or "H" variety restricted to certain formal situations, and a "low" or "L" variety for everyday interaction. This article contains a list of nations, cultures, or other communities which sources describe as featuring a diglossic language situation.

== Americas ==
=== African American Vernacular English ===
In the United States, Standard English is considered H while AAVE is considered L. Its pronunciation is, in some respects, common to Southern American English, which is spoken by many African Americans and many non-African Americans in the United States. Several creolists, including William Stewart, John Dillard, and John Rickford, argue that AAVE shares so many characteristics with creole dialects spoken by black people in much of the world that AAVE itself is a creole, while others maintain that there are no significant parallels. Many African-Americans do not use AAVE, but those who do not are at risk of being criticized about their identity. Additionally, many non-African-Americans use AAVE, depending on where they live and their socioeconomic status.

=== Brazilian Portuguese ===
According to some contemporary Brazilian linguists (Bortoni, Kato, Mattos e Silva, Perini and most recently, with great impact, Bagno), Brazilian Portuguese may be a highly diglossic language. This theory claims that there is an L-variant (termed "Brazilian Vernacular"), which would be the mother tongue of all Brazilians, and an H-variant (standard Brazilian Portuguese) acquired through schooling. L-variant represents a simplified form of the language (in terms of grammar, but not of phonetics) that could have evolved from 16th-century Portuguese, influenced by other European, Amerindian (mostly Tupian) and African languages, while H-variant would be based on 19th century European Portuguese (and very similar to Standard European Portuguese, with only minor differences in spelling and grammar usage). Mário A. Perini, a Brazilian linguist, even compares the depth of the differences between L- and H- variants of Brazilian Portuguese with those between Standard Spanish and Standard Portuguese. Milton M. Azevedo wrote a chapter on diglossia in his monography: Portuguese language (A linguistic introduction), published by Cambridge University Press, in 2005, parts of which are available freely on Google books.

=== Jamaica ===
In Jamaica, everyone is able to speak and understand the vernacular patois (or Patwa), a centuries-old English derived creole. Many also understand and can speak "standard" English; however, in common everyday oral usage, people generally use one or the other exclusively, according to social status and formal education. In everyday commerce, business, banking, media and government—in short, the entire private and public sector—acrolect English is used. This has resulted in a diglossia situation. Situational code-switching, style shifting and code-alternation occur continuously, seamlessly in communication between all Jamaicans of all classes and in all situations, in all speech acts. Recently, Jamaican patois has gone through a process of decreolization, similar to that which happened with AAVE due to the basilect creole variety developing alongside the acrolect English. For all practical purposes, English is Jamaica's native language. When the English took over the country from the Spanish in the seventeenth century Jamaica was linguistically a blank slate. The country came under English jurisdiction and the incoming new colonists were English. English became the de facto language because there was no other language there at the time. The native Arawak (Taino) had long disappeared, and with the arrival of the English in 1655 the few Spanish settlers on the island fled to Cuba. The thousands of West African slaves that would be brought in for labour on the island's notorious sugar plantations of the eighteenth century had not yet arrived. Jamaican patois came into being when the island's burgeoning sugar industry created a large demand for field labour. The incoming African slave labourers—who spoke many various languages themselves—and the English speaking plantocracy communicated through the formation of a contact creole language unique to Jamaica. Today we know this creole as patois, and even those Jamaicans who don't speak it on a daily basis can speak it fluently, and fully understand it. Jamaican patois is sometimes written (in song lyrics, reported speech in books and newspapers for example) but because of the lack of standardization, many words may be spelled in many different ways. Standard English is taught in Jamaican schools, although teachers may speak to pupils and their parents in patois outside of the classroom.

=== Paraguay ===
In Paraguay, both modern-day Spanish and the Guaraní indigenous language are spoken, and both are official and taught in schools. But a great part of the population speak an informal, barely codified variant of the latter, with many Spanish influences, called Jopará.

=== Peru ===
In Peru, as throughout most of Latin America, Spanish is considered the 'H' language while indigenous languages like Quechua dialects or Ayamara are considered the 'L' language. This has resulted in most Peruvians who do speak an indigenous language using Spanish more and more in everyday life.

== Africa and Asia ==
=== Bengali ===
Traditionally, Bengali exhibits diglossia in both written and spoken forms of the language's uppermost registers. Shadhubhasha (সাধু shadhu = 'chaste' or 'sage'; ভাষা bhasha = 'language') exhibited longer verb inflections and heavily Sanskritized vocabulary. Up to the turn of the 19th century, most Bengali literature took this form. Cholitbhasha (চলতিভাষা ) or Cholitobhasha (চলিত cholito = 'current' or 'running'), based on the formal registers of spoken, educated dialects, has much simpler grammatical forms, and has become the modern literary standard.

=== Burmese ===
Burmese is a diglossic language with two distinguishable registers (or diglossic varieties):

1. Literary High (H) form (မြန်မာစာ mranma ca): the high variety (formal and written), used in literature (formal writing), newspapers, radio broadcasts, and formal speeches
2. Spoken Low (L) form (မြန်မာစကား mranma ca.ka:): the low variety (informal and spoken), used in daily conversation, television, comics and literature (informal writing)

The literary form of Burmese retains archaic and conservative grammatical structures and modifiers (including particles, markers and pronouns) no longer used in the colloquial form. In most cases, the corresponding grammatical markers in the literary and spoken forms are totally unrelated to each other. Examples of this phenomenon include the following lexical items:

- "this" (pronoun): HIGH ဤ i → LOW ဒီ di
- "that" (pronoun): HIGH ထို htui → LOW ဟို hui
- "at" (postposition): HIGH ၌ hnai. [n̥aɪʔ] → LOW မှာ hma [m̥à]
- plural (marker): HIGH များ mya: → LOW တွေ twe
- possessive (marker): HIGH ၏ i. → LOW ရဲ့ re.
- "and" (conjunction): HIGH နှင့် hnang. → LOW နဲ့ ne.
- "if" (conjunction): HIGH လျှင် hlyang → LOW ရင် rang

Historically the literary register was preferred for written Burmese on the grounds that "the spoken style lacks gravity, authority, dignity". In the mid-1960s some Burmese writers spearheaded efforts to abandon the literary form, asserting that the spoken vernacular form ought to be used. Some Burmese linguists such as Minn Latt, a Czech academic, proposed moving away from the high form of Burmese altogether. Although the literary form is heavily used in written contexts (literary and scholarly works, radio news broadcasts, and novels), the recent trend has been to accommodate the spoken form in informal written contexts. Nowadays, television news broadcasts, comics, and commercial publications use the spoken form or a combination of the spoken and simpler, less ornate formal forms.

=== Cape Verdean Creole ===
Perhaps one of the oldest creoles in existence, the Kriolu/Crioulu/Kabuverdianu/Caboverdiano of the Cape Verde islands has existed alongside the Portuguese brought by slave traders since the 15th century. Inhabiting the island with slaves brought from all along the West African coast, a pidgin developed to allow for communication both between traders and slaves as well as among slaves of different ethnic groups. Today, Kriolu is used mostly in the home and in casual settings, while Portuguese is the language of government and business. More recently, some events and organizations are beginning to conduct business, conferences, and symposiums in Kriolu, while schools debate to what extent Kriolu should be used in the classrooms. Efficiency and international competency are certainly important to consider when making a choice to use Portuguese or Kriolu in institutional settings, but so is the cultural identity for which Kriolu is so essential to maintain.

=== Chinese ===
For over two thousand years, the Chinese used Classical Chinese (Literary Chinese) as a formal standard written language. The standard written language served as a bridge for communication throughout China and other Sinosphere countries for millennia.

However, the colloquial varieties of Chinese continued to evolve. The gulf became so wide between the formal written and colloquial spoken languages that it was blamed for hindering education and literacy, and some even went so far as to blame it in part for the political turmoil that occurred in China during the 19th and early 20th centuries. This eventually culminated in the adoption of written vernacular Chinese, which was based on modern spoken Mandarin, for all formal communication.

==== Modern Chinese ====
After the adoption of vernacular Chinese as the modern standard written language in the early 20th century, diglossia was no longer a big issue among the majority of Chinese speakers who learn Mandarin Chinese as the standard national dialect. However, standard Chinese and its pronunciation in local Chinese language varieties is still a formal register in regions where Mandarin is not spoken natively, such as most of South China.

For instance in Hong Kong and Macau, Cantonese is the primary language of spoken communication, although all formal written communication is done in standard written Chinese. Unique among the other Chinese language varieties, Cantonese has its own written form, but it is largely used in informal contexts, such as personal communication, internet slang, advertising, music, and film.

Literate Chinese speakers can read and write in the Mandarin-based standard written language. However, because the graphemes in Chinese's logographic writing system are not directly linked to pronunciation (though there are quasi-phonetic hints), Cantonese speakers who do not speak Mandarin will read aloud the characters in Cantonese pronunciation only. The resulting speech is Mandarin-based grammar and vocabulary pronounced word-by-word in Cantonese. If the same sentence were to be spoken using regular colloquial Cantonese, it might be quite different. Here is an example:

English Sentence	Please give me his book.
Standard written Chinese rendition (Traditional Chinese characters)	請(Please) 給(give) 我(I) 他(he) 的(GENITIVE) 書(book) 。(.)
Standard written Chinese rendition (Simplified Chinese characters)	请(Please) 给(give) 我(I) 他(he) 的(GENITIVE) 书(book) 。(.)
Standard Chinese pronunciation of writing	Qǐng gěi wǒ tā de shū.
Cantonese pronunciation of writing	Chíng kāp ngóh tā dīk syū.
Written colloquial Cantonese rendition	唔該(Please) 畀(give) 佢(he) 本(MEASURE) 書(book) 我(I) 。(.)
Colloquial Cantonese pronunciation	M̀h-gōi béi kéuih bún syū ngóh.

Note: Mandarin romanized using Hanyu Pinyin. Cantonese romanized using Yale. Written Cantonese shown uses characters not in standard written Chinese.

In the above example, note the switching of the direct and indirect objects and the use of different vocabulary for certain words in the standard Chinese and colloquial Cantonese renditions. In addition, Cantonese grammar allows the use of classifiers to serve in the place of a genitive particle.

==== Classical Chinese ====
Before the modern adoption of written vernacular Chinese, the diglossic situation also applied to Mandarin speakers when Classical Chinese was the standard written language.

Continuing the previous example for comparison, using Classical Chinese it would be:

Classical Chinese rendition (Traditional Chinese characters)	求(Request) 爾(you) 予(give) 我(I) 其(one's) 書(book) 。(.)
Classical Chinese rendition (Simplified Chinese characters)	求(Request) 尔(you) 予(give) 我(I) 其(one's) 书(book) 。(.)
Mandarin pronunciation of Classical Chinese	Qiú ěr yǔ wǒ qí shū.
Cantonese pronunciation of Classical Chinese	Kàuh yíh yúh ngóh kèih syū.

Because Chinese's logographic writing system doesn't indicate exact pronunciation, the pronunciation of Classical Chinese in Old Chinese is generally not possible (though tentative reconstructions of the phonology of Old Chinese have been attempted). Instead, Classical Chinese is also generally pronounced according to the local dialect (such as the Mandarin and Cantonese pronunciations given above), much like how Cantonese speakers pronounce the modern Mandarin-based written Chinese using Cantonese.

Unlike the situation with modern Chinese, however, Classical Chinese spoken according to the pronunciations of the modern spoken Chinese varieties is still largely unintelligible without training due to the syntax and vocabulary changes that Chinese has undergone since Old Chinese. In addition, sound mergers in the modern dialects cause many distinct words in Classical Chinese to sound homophonous. For one notable example, see Lion-Eating Poet in the Stone Den.

=== Hindi ===
Hindi has two forms: the H form called shuddha Hindi and the L form called Hindustani. Both are based on the same dialect: Dehlavi. The L variety, Hindustani (often simply called Hindi) contains many loanwords from Persian and Arabic, along with a massive vocabulary of English loanwords which increases day by day. The L variety is identical with spoken Urdu—except for the fact that the latter is written in Perso-Arabic script. The H variety was standardized in the 1960s during the movement to adopt Hindi as national language of Indian Union. Shuddh (lit., pure) Hindi primarily uses words from Sanskrit to replace not only English loanwords, but also loanwords from Persian and Arabic which had been nativized for centuries. These words are called tatsam words, and they even replaced many tadbhav words, i.e. words of Sanskrit origin but having undergone profound phonological changes.

An example is the Hindi version of the sentence: "This morning I read the newspaper but could not study those books."

Shuddh Hindi	āj	prātaḥ	maĩne	samāchār-patr(a)	paḍhā,	parantu	un	pustakõ	kā	adhyayan	nahĩ	kar	sakā.
Hindustani	āj	subah	maĩne	akhbār	paḍhā,	lekin	un	kitābõ	kī	paḍhāī	nahĩ	kar	sakā.
Gloss	today	morning	I-erg	newspaper	read.Perfective	but	those	books	of	study	not	do	could.Perfective

Here, prātaḥ, samāchār-patr(a) and parantu are loanwords from Sanskrit used in the H form, versus the Arabic loanwords subah, akhbār and lekin which are rather more popular in speech. Adhyayan is loanwords from Sanskrit which can even replace native tadhbhav word paḍhāī (which in turn is derived from Sanskrit paṭhana after phonological changes). On the other hand, the H form has highly minimized the use of Persian and Arabic phonemes /z/, /f/, /x/, /ɣ/ and /q/. Partly because they are written in the Hindi alphabet (devanagari, strictly speaking an alpha-syllabary) as a dot beneath traditionally existing alphabets (ज़, फ़, ख़, ग़, क़ ), and the dot is omitted in casual writing, many Hindi speakers mistake them for the Sanskrit phonemes /dʒ/, /pʰ/, /kʰ/, /ɡ/ and /k/.

The L variety is used in common speech, TV serials and Bollywood movies and songs. The H variety is used in official and government writings, scholarly books and magazines, signboards, public announcements and public speaking.

=== Malay ===
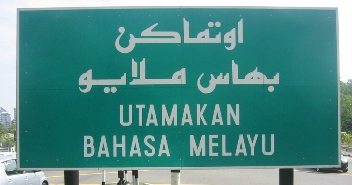
A sign along the road in Bandar Seri Begawan, the capital of Brunei, which reads "Prioritise the Malay language." The text at the top of the sign says the same in the Arabic-based Jawi script.

The Malay language exists in a Classical variety, and modern standard variety and several vernacular dialects.

In Brunei, Standard Malay (Bahasa Melayu) is promoted as the national language and is the H variety, while Brunei Malay is used very widely throughout society and it constitutes the L variety. One major difference between these dialects of Malay is that Brunei Malay tends to have the verb at the front, while Standard Malay generally places it after the subject. It has been estimated that 84% of core vocabulary in Brunei Malay and Standard Malay is cognate, though their pronunciation often differs very considerably. While Standard Malay has six vowels, Brunei Malay has only three: /a, i, u/.

One complicating factor is that English is also widely used in Brunei, especially in education, as it is the medium of instruction from upper primary school onwards, so it shares the H role with Standard Malay. Another code that competes for the H role in some situations is the special palace register of Brunei Malay, which includes an elaborate system of honorific terms for addressing and referring to the Sultan and other nobles. Finally, although Standard Malay is used for sermons in the mosques (as expected for the H variety), readings from the Qur'an are in Arabic.

=== Manchu ===
Standard Manchu was based on the language spoken by the Jianzhou Jurchens during Nurhaci's time, while other unwritten Manchu dialects such as that of Aigun and Sanjiazi were also spoken in addition to the related Xibe language.

=== Mongolian ===
Classical Mongolian language was the high register used for religious and official purposes while the various Mongolian dialects serve as the low register, like Khalkha Mongolian, Chakhar Mongolian, Khorchin Mongolian, Kharchin Mongolian, Baarin Mongolian, Ordos Mongolian, and the Buryat language. The Tibetan Buddhist canon was translated into Classical Mongolian. The Oirat Mongols who spoke the Oirat Mongol language and dialects like Kalmyk language or Torgut Oirat used a separate standard written with the Clear script.

The Mongolian language, based on Khalkha Mongolian, now serves as the high register in Mongolia itself while in Inner Mongolia a standard Mongolian based on Chakhar Mongolian serves as the high register for all Mongols in China. The Buryat language has been turned into a standard literary form itself in Russia.

=== Sinhalese ===
Sinhala (also known as Sinhalese), spoken in Sri Lanka, is a diglossic language. There are several differences between the literary language (also known as Literary Sinhala, LS) and the spoken language (Spoken Sinhala, SS), especially about verbs:

- different personal pronouns:
  - "he, she": LS ohu, æja; SS eja (lit. "that one", common);
- lack of inflection of the verb in SS:
  - "I do", "you (sing.) do": LS mamə kərəmi, obə kərəi (inflected); SS mamə kərənəʋa, obə kərənəʋa (not-inflected, the same form for all persons)
- lack of future tense in SS, substituted by present tense plus optional temporal adverb:
  - LS mamə jannəmi "I will go"; SS heʈə mamə janəʋa "tomorrow I will go" (lit. "tomorrow I go");
- different verbal forms (e.g. present participle in LS versus reduplicated form in SS);
- different adpositions:
  - "with": LS saməⁿɡə; SS ekːa
  - "from" (temporal): LS siʈə; SS iⁿdəla
  - "before" : LS perə; SS isːelːa, isːəra
- different vocabulary, e.g.:
  - "to help": LS upəkaːrə kərənəʋa; SS udau kərənəʋa
  - "to touch": LS sparʃəjə kərənəʋa; SS allənəʋa
  - "to marry": LS ʋiʋahə ʋenəʋa; SS kasaːdə baⁿdinəʋa
  - "to study": LS adːjənəjə kərənəʋa; SS paːɖəm kərənəʋa
  - "to fight": LS saʈən kərənəʋa; SS ranɖu kərənəʋa

Literary or written Sinhala is commonly understood, and used in literary texts and formal occasions (public speeches, TV and radio news broadcasts, etc.), whereas the spoken language is used as the language of communication in everyday life. Children are taught the written language at school almost like a foreign language.

=== Singapore ===
Many analysts regard the use of English in Singapore as diglossic, with Singapore Standard English (SStdE) forming the H variety and Singapore Colloquial English (SCE, also known as 'Singlish') constituting the L variety. SStdE is similar to other varieties of Standard English in grammar and lexis but with some of its own features of pronunciation, particularly the use of full vowels (rather than [ə]) in most function words and also the sporadic absence of dental fricatives, while SCE is characterised by a simplified grammar (including the omission of some conjunctions and the copula verb BE) and regular use of pragmatic particles such as lah and ah, as well as frequent inclusion of Hokkien and Malay words.

However, other analysts prefer to see variation in the English spoken in Singapore along a continuum, with the style adopted depending on the education level and circumstances of the conversation. Some well-educated, proficient speakers have been shown to use mostly SStdE but with many pragmatic particles when talking to their friends, and this seems to provide evidence to support the continuum analysis.

It is certainly true that speakers are able to switch quite abruptly, for example as they exit a classroom and start chatting to their friends, so one way or another there are many characteristics of diglossia in spoken Singapore English.

=== Tagalog ===
Tagalog is the primary language spoken in the southern half of Luzon, the northernmost island group in the Philippines. Southern Luzon covers the provinces around and including Metro Manila.

The Manila Dialect is the basis for the country's national language, Filipino (which is the High register). Tagalogs originating from provinces outside of Metro Manila speak their own dialects, such as Batangan Tagalog (which are the Low registers). Additionally, speakers of other Philippine languages originating from different parts of the country, such as Cebuano and Ilokano, will switch to Tagalog when communicating with those outside of their respective regions and in formal settings. Official publications and other documents are also written in Tagalog and Philippine English (the country's other official language), and seldom in a local language.

=== Tamil ===
Tamil has 3 forms: Cankatamizh, modelled on Old Tamil, Centamizh, the style used in modern formal contexts today, and Kotuntamizh, the modern colloquial form. These styles form a continuum, so that some writers use Cenkatamizh words while writing in Centamizh. Cenkatamizh and Centamizh are very different from the various dialects of Kotuntamizh.

The classic form is preferred for writing, and is also used for public speaking. While the written Tamil language is mostly standard across various Tamil-speaking regions, the spoken form of the language differs widely from the written form. Perunchitthranar, a Tamil nationalist and others of his ilk, advocated that all Tamils speak only the pure form of the language, i.e., Centhamizh.

Tamil fiction-writers use Centhamizh for all descriptive writing and use "Kotunthamizh" only to narrate conversations between the characters in their works. There have been exceptions to this rule. Noted novelist Kalki Krishnamurthy once dismissed Centhamizh as Kodunthamizh (tortured Tamil) although his novels are written almost entirely in Centhamizh, both description and conversation. Even though all Tamils—no matter how educated they are—always converse in Kotuntamizh, Tamil novels used to depict educated people speaking in the classic form. Several decades ago, most Tamil movies had characters who spoke in Centamizh.

=== Thai ===
Standard Thai language has not only two (high and low) but several social registers with distinct functions: 1. Street or common Thai (ภาษาพูด, spoken Thai): informal, without polite terms of address, as used between close relatives and friends; 2. Elegant or formal Thai (ภาษาเขียน, written Thai): official and written version, includes respectful terms of address; used in simplified form in newspapers; 3. Rhetorical Thai: used for public speaking; 4. Religious Thai: (heavily influenced by Sanskrit and Pāli) used when discussing Buddhism or addressing monks; 5. Royal Thai (ราชาศัพท์): (influenced by Khmer) used when addressing members of the royal family or describing their activities. Most Thais can speak and understand all of these. Street and elegant Thai are the basis of all conversations; rhetorical, religious and royal Thai are taught in schools as the national curriculum.

=== Tibetan ===
Classical Tibetan was the high register used universally by all Tibetans while the various mutually unintelligible Tibetic languages serve as the low register vernacular, like Central Tibetan language in Ü-Tsang (Tibet proper), Khams Tibetan in Kham, Amdo Tibetan in Amdo, Ladakhi language in Ladakh, and Dzongkha in Bhutan. Classical Tibetan was used for official and religious purposes, such as in Tibetan Buddhist religious texts like the Tibetan Buddhist canon and taught and learned in monasteries and schools in Tibetan Buddhist regions.

Now Standard Tibetan, based on the Lhasa dialect, serves as the high register in China. In Bhutan, the Tibetan Dzongkha language has been standardized and replaced Classical Tibetan for official purposes and education, in Ladakh, the standard official language learned are now the unrelated languages Hindi-Urdu and English, and in Baltistan, the Tibetan Balti language serves as the low register while the unrelated Urdu language is the official language.

=== Urdu ===
In Pakistan there is a diglossia between the extremely Persianised/Arabicized Urdu (used by the literary elite such as poets, writers, and government officials), and a colloquial Urdu that is very similar to colloquial Hindi (spoken by common people, and known as Hindustani among linguists). Colloquial Pakistani Urdu is also highly influenced by Punjabi. As English is one of the two official languages of Pakistan, the other being Urdu, there is a degree of diglossia between the upper and middle and lower classes. The upper and upper-middle classes tend to be educated in English medium schools whereas the lower class are schooled in either Urdu or one of the regional languages (usually Pashto or Sindhi). The language of the bureaucracy and the higher courts is English, but there is a high degree of code switching between Urdu, English and regional languages in the parliament, provincial legislatures and private sector, such as with Urdish.

=== Uzbek and Uyghur ===
The Turkic Chagatai language served as the high register literary standard for Central Asian Turkic peoples, while the vernacular low register languages were the Uzbek language and Eastern Turki (Modern Uyghur). The Soviet Union abolished Chagatai as the literary standard and had the Uzbek language standardized as a literary language for, and the Taranchi dialect of Ili was chosen as the literary standard for Modern Uyghur, while other dialects like the Kashgar and Turpan dialects continue to be spoken.

== Europe ==
=== Catalan ===
With the exception of Andorra, Catalan as spoken outside of Catalonia may be in various grades, from highly to barely diglossic. Diglossia in Catalan is typically stronger in some metropolitan areas than rural or sparsely populated areas.

This phenomenon affects almost all areas in the Valencian Community with its Valencian as well as Alghero (whose local Catalan dialect remains in severe danger of extinction despite the recent revival in its usage), some touristy areas and the main cities in the Balearic Islands—sometimes competing with outside languages, for example English— and most of North Catalonia

=== English and Anglo-Norman ===
Prior to the Norman invasion of 1066, Old English in its various dialects was spoken in England. For some centuries following the conquest, England experienced diglossia between a French ruling class who spoke Anglo-Norman and commoners who spoke English. As French gradually waned, English changed and took over until Middle English and Modern English was created through the merger of this divide. However, there is still evidence of a division, between "academic" words and "common" words. Many words for foods use French-derived vocabulary, while the word for the corresponding animal is of Germanic (Old English) origin: for example, pork and swine, mutton and lamb, or beef and cow.

=== French ===
Standard French and Walloon have traditionally been a diglossic system in Belgium's southern region, Wallonia. Similar diglossia occurs or has occurred in areas of France where other languages are dominant in the home and daily life, including French and Provençal (Occitan) in Provence and southern France, and, prior to the mid-20th century, French and Alsatian in Alsace-Lorraine.

=== Galician ===
Galicia is a classic example of diglossia, as the majority language Galician is regarded by most native speakers as inferior to the State language, Spanish, or Portuguese. Since the sixteenth century the upper layers of the Galician society, i.e. the town gentry, the civil servants and the Church, used Spanish as their main or only language whereas the vast majority of the population, made up of peasants and fishermen, continued to speak Galician. This entrenched a perception of Galician as a language of inferior people that prevented social promotion. Thus, when urbanization spread in earnest in the mid twentieth century the new middle classes and urban blue collar cohorts started to adopt Spanish in a diglossic context, Galician at home and Spanish at work. This is a situation that persists to a slightly lesser degree to this day even as both languages are official and the Galician language now enjoys a relatively strong industrial culture and media.

To make things more complicated a similar relationship exists between spoken Galician or Leonese and the literary standard that was developed when Galician became official language in 1983, as native speakers resent the fact the standard lacks naturality, does not include widely assumed phonetic or lexical features of the spoken language such as gheada (pronouncing "g" as the English "h" as in /halicia/ instead of Galicia) as well as reintroducing Galician words that have long been replaced in the spoken language by their Spanish and in some cases English equivalents. Therefore, it is not uncommon to find native Galician speakers that for instance speak colloquial Galician at home, Spanish at work and standard Galician in public events or when liaising with the Public Administration.

=== German ===
Standard German was almost entirely restricted as a written language until the early 20th century, when Northern pronunciation was accepted as Standard, and the language spread. In fact, in cities such as Hanover and Berlin, the dialect started disappearing with the exception of a small minority of Low German speakers that only make up 5 million people. In most of Germany (except southern German Bundesländer Bavaria and Baden-Württemberg, where Bavarian and Swabish are commonly spoken), people generally use Standard German. This is the case of language loss, where speakers of German generally started using Standard rather than dialect. This is due to children mastering the Standard language at school and common media use of the Standard language.

In German-speaking Switzerland, the Swiss German dialects are used in everyday conversations, as every German-speaking Swiss is diglossic, and dialects of Swiss German are in widespread use. The Swiss variety of Standard German (aka High German), however, is also used to a certain extent in school and church practices. Swiss Standard German is mostly restricted to being a written language, as spoken Swiss Standard German is merely used in more formal situations such as news broadcasts and serious programmes of the public media channels, public speeches, parliamentary sessions, official announcements, school instruction, and interactions with non-Swiss speakers.

=== Gibraltar ===
British English occupies the position of high variety in the British Overseas Territory of Gibraltar while Andalusian Spanish occupies the position of low variety, particularly as spoken in its local Llanito variety. Code-switching and Translanguaging are common place in Gibraltarian language practice.

=== Greek ===
Until the 1970s, the Greek language distinguished between Dimotiki, the colloquial language which was used in everyday discussions and the extremely formal and archaic Katharevousa, which was used in more "educated" contexts, as in school, in court, in law texts etc. Extreme Katharevousa was, in fact, nearly pure Ancient Greek, and as such, almost completely unintelligible to children and adults lacking higher education; however there was a linguistic spectrum, with so-called Simple Katharevousa quite close to Dimotiki, and the emerging urban standard of Dimotiki making more concessions to Katharevousa than its more radical form. The Greek language question, from the 1890s on, was a heated dispute on which language form was to be the official language of the state: unlike typical diglossic situations, the primacy of the H variant was disputed, and the choice of variant became politicized, with Dimotiki associated with the left wing and Katharevousa with the right; morphological choices could even end up used as political shibboleths. This dispute was eventually settled, and today the single language used in all texts is an educated variant of Dimotiki, which uses many expressions from Katharevousa. This variant is commonly called Standard Modern Greek.

The contemporary linguistic situation in Cyprus is also diglossic, with Modern Greek taking the H role, and Cypriot Greek the L role.

=== Italian ===
Throughout most of Italy, diglossia between Italian as H and local indigenous languages – for the most part Romance – as L has long been the normal situation. The local Romance languages, somewhat ambiguously referred to as dialetti 'dialects', are direct descendants of Latin, and until relatively recently were the first languages of most Italians. Today their use is receding, but especially in smaller towns and villages it is still common for natives to use the local variety as home language and amongst themselves, and use Italian with outsiders or in formal situations.

A similar situation is registered in areas in which a non-Romance languages are spoken in addition to Italian. Some non-Romance linguistic communities have been recognized by the State since the end of World War II, such as the German speakers in South Tyrol and Slovene speakers in the provinces of Trieste and Gorizia. In these cases, most members of the minorities are fluent in both their native language and standard Italian, resulting in a situation of bilingualism rather than diglossy. In most other cases, there is a diglossic situation between Italian as H, and the non-Romance minority languages as L. Examples include: Molise Croats, the Arberesh communities in southern Italy, Slovene speakers in Friulian Slovenia, the Resian dialect in Friuli-Venezia Giulia, and Alemannic German speakers in Valle d'Aosta.

An interesting situation occurs in Valle d'Aosta, where the majority of the population is bilingual French-Italian, but live in a diglossic situation in regards to Franco-Provençal.

=== Maltese ===
Malta is officially a bilingual country: both Maltese and English are official languages. Maltese is a Semitic language with extensive Italian influence.

Maltese society has been traditionally quite strongly divided, politically, between the working class and middle and upper classes and this is reflected in their language use. Although all Maltese can speak their native language, the extent to which one uses and is able to speak English often reflects one's background. This is most clearly illustrated by the different newspapers in Malta: the liberal/conservative ones are in English (with names like the Times of Malta and Malta Independent) and the more left-leaning ones are in Maltese. Maltese people of a middle- and upper-class background will often speak English or use code-switching extensively in public. There have been warnings from several quarters including a linguistics professor from the University of Malta that the Maltese language could become endangered if the government does not do more to promote it, in the same way that English displaced Welsh in Wales.

Before 1934, Italian was an official language in Malta and used in the court system. Those in higher class positions spoke Italian, and were often associated with the Italian irredentism movement which promoted the unification of Malta with Italy. It was only those of lower class at the time, whose ancestors came from Sicily too long ago for them to still be fluent in Italian, who spoke primarily Maltese. Today, the influence of the Italian language is still present in Malta. Not only is it used in the professional workplace but also it is key to Malta's media, such as television, radio and publications.

=== Polish ===
Polish, with respect to the upper class of the Polish society within the Kingdom of Poland, most especially landed nobility, was a low language until Jan Kochanowski stopped writing in Latin, the high language of the time, and decided to use his own native Polish as the literary language during the late sixteenth century. Polish, however, was often, but not always, the high language during the seventeenth and eighteenth centuries in the Grand Duchy of Lithuania in spite of the early Belarusian being the official language.

Before World War II, the Polish intelligentsia and those trying to emulate them, over-pronounced the words with hard "h" such as "hak" ("hook" in Polish) to know when to spell a word with "h", and when to spell the soft "h" sound with "ch" as in "chleb" ("bread" in Polish). An example of a person using this method to spell properly is Jerzy Petersburski.

Another aspect is the pronunciation of the letter "ł." The traditional pronunciation of "ł" was [ɫ̪], a velarized form of L. That pronunciation was called the "noble's ł" (Ł szlacheckie) or "borderland ł" (Ł kresowe.) Today it is referred to as the Ł przedniojęzykowe and has mostly died out within Poland, replaced by the now standard [w] pronunciation. The old form is still spoken in the border regions and in the old Kresy, by Poles in Lithuania and Galicia.

The main reason for its disappearance within central Poland may be the elimination of Polish elites during World War 2 and the communist period. Nonetheless, even during the communist era, up to the 1960s and all radio announcers, theatre and movie actors were still schooled to use the traditional ł (ł sceniczne) and can be heard in old news reels, and even children cartoons such as Miś Uszatek.

=== Ukrainian ===
Until recently, Russian has been the High language and Ukrainian the Low language. However, data collected recently shows that diglossia in Ukraine is shifting.

With the language policy of the Ukrainian government, and the continued use of Russian in many parts of the country, there are many places (including Kyiv, Odesa, the Crimea, and the eastern part of the country) where people use Russian for everyday speech but Ukrainian for official purposes and street signs. Consequently, Russian is now the Low language and Ukrainian the High, which is a reversal from their relative position before Ukraine's independence.

== Middle East and North Africa ==
=== Arabic ===
Throughout the Arab World, Classical Arabic is the "high" standard written language and the many local colloquial dialects of Arabic are the "low" variety. However, every Arabic speaker, no matter how "cultured," is raised speaking a dialect.

The situation with the Classical Arabic (الفصحى al-fuṣ-ḥā) versus spoken varieties of Arabic (العامية al-`āmmiyya or الدارجة ad-dārija) differs from country to country, but every Arab country's official language is "Modern standard Arabic" (MSA). Certain dialects have obtained a level of prestige. There is no consensus on which variety of Arabic should be taught to foreigners, although generally MSA is, since nearly all Arabic texts are written in that variety.

The debate continues about the future of the divided Arabic language, both among Arabic linguists in the Arab world and those outside it. Some prefer the status quo (existing diglossia). Many Arab purists, on the other hand, insist that only Modern Standard Arabic should be used, written and taught, believing all dialectical versions to be decadent. Some suggestions are:

1. Promote Modern Standard Arabic exclusively, to be used colloquially, outside the formal situations, on an everyday basis by introducing more audio-material, enforcing the usage on mass-media. A lot of cartoons have been created in MSA, which help young Arabs master the standard language before they start schooling. There are proposals to simplify the grammar of MSA a little (eliminating the most complicated, seldom used and least understood features) and introduce some commonly known colloquial words (known across many dialects or groups of dialects). This idea is similar to the efforts in mainland China, Taiwan and Singapore where Mandarin has gained much popularity and the number of speakers is increasing, including those who speak it on a daily basis; or the situation with the Hebrew language, especially in Israel (see Revival of the Hebrew language); or the situation with Standard German in Austria and Germany (excluding Switzerland: see Switzerland section) in where the Standard language gained so much popularity people gave up their dialect in exchange for Standard German.
2. "Upgrade" individual dialects to forms closer to MSA or merge dialects into possibly one spoken Arabic, thus formalizing spoken Arabic as a standard. Often it is advocated in individual Arabic countries, promoting only the main dialect of the given country. This idea was especially popular in Egypt, where spoken Egyptian is often written down and there are works in Egyptian Arabic (لهجة مصرية lahja Miṣriyya (in formal Arabic) or lahga Maṣreyya (in Egyptian dialect) – "Egyptian dialect") and other countries, e.g. Kateb Yacine wrote in Algerian Arabic (لهجة جزائرية lahja Jazā'iriyya – "Algerian dialect"). The "formal spoken Arabic" includes more features of the standard Arabic and words are often selected, which are understood across a larger area. One such version of "Formal Spoken Arabic" (based on Levantine Arabic) is taught at Georgetown University and Foreign Service Institute (both in the US). This second idea is similar to Evolution from Ancient to Modern Greek in Greece. Many Arabic scholars are against this idea, as the current standard Arabic is perceived to be essentially "classical Arabic", the language of Qur'ān (القرآن al-qur’ān), and is the literary standard in the Arab world.

Both ideas (the Hebrew (1) or the Greek (2) language reforms) have become feasible with globalization and the increase of internet and mass-media usage among Arabs but there must be consensus between governments, scholars and the population and the efforts to follow. Al-Jazeera television and others have done much to promote standard Arabic among Arabs.

An example of the heated protectionism surrounding MSA and rejection of dialectical Arabic can be seen in this quote by Ibrahim Kayid Mahmoud, College of Education, King Faisal University, Al-Hassa , Saudi Arabia on Literary Arabic between Diglossia and Bilingualism (excerpt):

The study has concluded that both diglossia and bilingualism are the inveterate enemies of literary Arabic; they try to annihilate it. They create a weak, hesitant, indecisive anxious individual, with limited horizons.

Additionally, they constitute the direct cause of destroying creativity and scientific productivity. It is therefore imperative to protect Literary Arabic from the dangers of diglossia and bilingualism through taking the necessary measures to foster it and to give it due emphasis. Literary Arabic should be simplified and made more appealing to the younger generations. Educational institutions and mass media should also give it due emphasis. Current educational concepts should be utilized to promote literary Arabic. Arabic teachers should be adequately qualified."

The new Western term "Formal Spoken Arabic" (other terms include: "Educated Spoken Arabic," "Inter-Arabic," "Middle Arabic," and "Spoken MSA") is to describe a modern, hybrid-level variety of Arabic spoken by educated Arabs, a mix between standard Arabic (acrolect) and vernacular Arabic (basilect). It is more common in Eastern Arab states (the Levant and the Arabian Peninsula) but sometimes also used to describe high-level Egyptian or Maghrebi Arabic. This new term represents a spoken language shared by Arabs from different regions when they have to communicate with one another. The pronunciation may reveal the speaker's origin but nevertheless, this simplified version of Arabic is becoming popular with foreign students who wish to be able communicate with a wide range of Arabic speakers.

=== Aramaic ===
The Aramaic language has been diglossic for much of its history, with many different literary standards serving as the "high" liturgical languages, including Syriac language, Jewish Palestinian Aramaic, Jewish Babylonian Aramaic, Samaritan Aramaic language and Mandaic language, while the vernacular Neo-Aramaic languages serve as the vernacular language spoken by the common people like Northeastern Neo-Aramaic (Sureth, Bohtan Neo-Aramaic, Hértevin language, Koy Sanjaq Syriac language, Senaya language), Western Neo-Aramaic, Northeastern Neo-Aramaic, Central Neo-Aramaic (Mlahsô language, Turoyo language), Neo-Mandaic, Hulaulá language, Lishana Deni, Lishanid Noshan, Lishán Didán, Betanure Jewish Neo-Aramaic, and Barzani Jewish Neo-Aramaic.

=== Armenian ===
The Armenian language was a diglossic language for much of its history, with Classical Armenian serving as the "high" literary standard and liturgical language, and the Western Armenian and Eastern Armenian dialects serving as the vernacular language of the Armenian people. Western Armenian and Eastern Armenian were eventually standardized into their own literary forms.

=== Georgian ===
The Georgian language has a literary liturgical form, the Old Georgian language, while the vernacular spoken varieties are the Georgian dialects and other related Kartvelian languages like Svan language, Mingrelian language, and Laz language.

=== Western Sahara ===
Western Sahara was under Spanish administration until 1975 as the "Spanish Sahara", the southern part of which was called Río de Oro. Despite the Spanish rule, Western Sahara retained a predominantly Islamic Arab-Berber culture, and Spanish has been declared a co-official language of the Sahrawi Republic, alongside Arabic.

== Sources ==
- "Diglossia in flux: language and ethnicity in Ukraine". Texas Linguistic Forum (1993) 33:79–88.
- Yavorska Galyna M. Prescriptyvna lingvistyka yak dyskurs: Mova, kultura, vlada (Prescriptive linguistics as a discourse: Language. Culture. Power). Kyiv, VIPOL, 2000. 288 p.
- Yavorska G. Do problemy naivnoyi linguistyky (On the problem of folk linguistics). – Lingvistychni studii. Cherkassy, 1999, #3:13–20.
- Yavorska G. Dejaki osoblyvosti movnykh kontaktiv blyz'kosporidnenykh mov (do kharakterystyky ukrain's'koho puryzmu) (On contacts of closely related languages: some features of Ukrainian purism). In memoriam of K. Trofymovych. L'viv, Litopys, 1998.
- "The Languages of Ukraine's Orange Revolution". REECAS Newsletter, Russian, East European & Central Asian Studies, Jackson School of International Studies, University of Washington (Spring).
- "A typology of surzhyk: mixed Ukrainian-Russian language". International Journal of Bilingualism 8(4):409–425.
- "Gender, language attitudes, and language status in Ukraine". Language in Society. 32:47–78.
- "Pidsvidome stavlennia do mov: zerkalo movnoï polityky". (Subconscious language attitudes: a mirror of language politics.) Urok Ukraïnskoï (Ukrainian journal for educators and language planners). Kyiv. 7:5–8. [Based on 1998 "Purity & power" data.]
- "Kartyna movnoho svitohliadu v Ukraïni". (Linguistic ideology in Ukraine). Movoznavstvo (major Ukrainian linguistics journal). 4/5:44–51. [Based on 1997 "Matching guises" data.]
- "Movna krytyka i samovpevnenist': ideolohichni vplyvy na status mov v Ukraïni". [Linguistic criticism and self-confidence: ideological influences on language status in Ukraine]. Derzhavnist' ukraïns'koï movy i movnyi dosvid svitu: materially mizhnarodnoï konferentsiï. Kyiv: National Academy of Sciences of Ukraine. Pp. 131–138.
- "Speaking of surzhyk: ideologies and mixed languages". Harvard Ukrainian Studies. 21(1/2):93–117.
- "Purity and power: the geography of language ideology in Ukraine". Michigan Discussions in Anthropology 13:165–189.
- "Matching guises and mapping language ideologies in Ukraine". Texas Linguistic Forum 37:298–310.

== Bibliography ==
- Aung Bala (1981). "Contemporary Burmese literature". Contributions to Asian Studies. 16.
- Aung Zaw (September 2010). "Tell the World the Truth". The Irrawaddy. 18 (9). Archived from the original on 2010-09-18.
- Bradley, David (1996-12-31). "Burmese as a lingua franca". In Wurm, Stephen A.; Mühlhäusler, Peter; Tryon, Darrell T. (eds.). Atlas of Languages of Intercultural Communication in the Pacific, Asia, and the Americas. De Gruyter Mouton. pp. 745–748. doi:10.1515/9783110819724.2.745. ISBN 978-3-11-013417-9.
- Bradley, David (2010). "9. Burma, Thailand, Cambodia, Laos and Vietnam" (PDF). In Martin J. Ball (ed.). The Routledge Handbook of Sociolinguistics Around the World. Routledge. pp. 98–99. ISBN 978-0-415-42278-9. Archived from the original (PDF) on 2016-07-16.
- Bradley, David (1995). "Reflexives in Burmese" (PDF). Papers in Southeast Asian Linguistics No. 13: Studies in Burmese Languages (A-83): 139–172.
- Herbert, Patricia M.; Milner, Anthony Crothers, eds. (1989). South-East Asia Languages and Literatures: A Select Guide. University of Hawaii Press. ISBN 978-0-8248-1267-6.
- Poplack, Shana (2000), The English History of African American English, Blackwell
- Poplack, Shana; Tagliamonte, Sali (2001), African American English in the Diaspora, Blackwell
- Pullum, Geoffrey K. (March 27, 1997), "Language that dare not speak its name", Nature, 386 (6623): 321–322, Bibcode:1997Natur.386..321P, doi:10.1038/386321a0, S2CID 4255646, archived from the original on May 27, 2010
- Smith, Ernie; Crozier, Karen (1998), "Ebonics Is Not Black English", The Western Journal of Black Studies, 22: 109–116
- Wardhaugh, Ronald (2002), An Introduction to Sociolinguistics, Blackwell
