= Literary language =

Form of a language used in written literature

Literary language is the register of a language used when writing in a formal, academic, or particularly polite tone; when speaking or writing in such a tone, it can also be known as formal language. It may be the standardized variety of a language. It can sometimes differ noticeably from the various spoken lects, but the difference between literary and non-literary forms is greater in some languages than in others. If there is a strong divergence between a written form and the spoken vernacular, the language is said to exhibit diglossia.

The understanding of the term differs from one linguistic tradition to another and is dependent on the terminological conventions adopted.

== Literary English ==
For much of its history, there has been a distinction in the English language between an elevated literary language (written) and a colloquial or vernacular language (spoken, but sometimes also represented in writing). After the Norman conquest of England, for instance, Latin and French displaced English as the official and literary languages, and standardized literary English did not emerge until the end of the Middle Ages. At this time and into the Renaissance, the practice of aureation (the introduction of terms from classical languages, often through poetry) was an important part of the reclamation of status for the English language, and many historically aureate terms are now part of general common usage. Modern English no longer has quite the same distinction between literary and colloquial registers.

English has been used as a literary language in countries that were formerly part of the British Empire, for instance in India up to the present day, Malaysia in the early 20th century and Nigeria, where English remains the official language.

Written in Early Modern English, the King James Bible and works by William Shakespeare from the 17th century are defined as prototype media of literary English and are taught in advanced English classes. Furthermore, many literary words that are used today are found in abundance in the works of Shakespeare as well as in the King James Bible, hence the literary importance of early modern English in contemporary English literature and English studies.

== Other languages ==
=== Arabic ===
Modern Standard Arabic is the contemporary literary and standard register of Classical Arabic used in writing across all Arabic-speaking countries and any governing body with Arabic as an official language. Many western scholars distinguish two varieties: the Classical Arabic of the Qur'an and early Islamic (7th to 9th centuries) literature; and Modern Standard Arabic (MSA), the standard language in use today. The modern standard language is closely based on the Classical language, and most Arabs consider the two varieties to be two registers of the same language. Literary Arabic or classical Arabic is the official language of all Arab countries and is the only form of Arabic taught in schools at all stages.

The sociolinguistic situation of Arabic in modern times provides a prime example of the linguistic phenomenon of diglossia—the use of two distinct varieties of the same language, usually in different social contexts. Educated Arabic speakers are usually able to communicate in MSA in formal situations. This diglossic situation facilitates code-switching in which a speaker switches back and forth between the two varieties of the language, sometimes even within the same sentence. In instances in which highly educated Arabic-speakers of different nationalities engage in conversation but find their dialects mutually unintelligible (e.g. a Moroccan speaking with a Kuwaiti), they are able to code switch into MSA for the sake of communication.

=== Aramaic ===
The Aramaic language has been diglossic for much of its history, with many different literary standards serving as the "high" liturgical languages, including Syriac language, Jewish Palestinian Aramaic, Jewish Babylonian Aramaic, Samaritan Aramaic language and Mandaic language, while the vernacular Neo-Aramaic languages serve as the vernacular language spoken by the common people like Northeastern Neo-Aramaic (Sureth, Bohtan Neo-Aramaic, Hértevin language, Koy Sanjaq Syriac language, Senaya language), Western Neo-Aramaic, Northeastern Neo-Aramaic, Central Neo-Aramaic (Mlahsô language, Turoyo language), Neo-Mandaic, Hulaulá language, Lishana Deni, Lishanid Noshan, Lishán Didán, Betanure Jewish Neo-Aramaic, and Barzani Jewish Neo-Aramaic.

=== Armenian ===
The Armenian language was a diglossic language for much of its history, with Classical Armenian serving as the "high" literary standard and liturgical language, and the Western Armenian and Eastern Armenian dialects serving as the vernacular language of the Armenian people. Western Armenian and Eastern Armenian were eventually standardized into their own literary forms.

=== Bengali ===
Standard Bengali has two forms:

- Chôlitôbhasha (চলিত ভাষা calita bhāṣā), the vernacular standard based on the elite speech of Kolkata.
- Shadhubhasha (সাধু ভাষা sādhu bhāṣā), the literary standard, which employs more Sanskritized vocabulary and longer prefixes and suffixes.

Grammatically, the two forms are identical; differing forms, such as verb conjugations, are easily converted from one form to another. However, the vocabulary is quite different from one form to the other and must be learned separately. Among the works of Rabindranath Tagore are examples of both shadhubhasha (especially among his earlier works) and chôlitôbhasha (especially among his later works). The national anthem of India was originally written in the shadhubhasha form of Bengali.

=== Chinese ===
Literary Chinese (文言文; wényánwén; 'written-speech writing') is the form of written Chinese used from the end of the Han dynasty to the early 20th century. Literary Chinese continually diverged from Classical Chinese, as the dialects of China became more disparate and as the classical written language became less representative of the spoken language. At the same time, Literary Chinese was based largely upon the Classical Chinese, and writers frequently borrowed from the classical language into their literary writings. Literary Chinese therefore shows a great deal of similarity to Classical Chinese, even though the similarity decreased over the centuries.

Starting from early 20th century, written vernacular Chinese (simplified Chinese: 白话文; traditional Chinese: 白話文; pinyin: báihuàwén) became the literary standard. This is mostly aligned with a standardized form of Mandarin Chinese, which however means there exists considerable divergence between written vernacular Chinese and other Chinese variants like Cantonese, Shanghainese, Hokkien and Sichuanese. Some of these variants have their own literary form, but none of them are currently used in official formal registers, although they may be used in legal transcription, and in certain media and entertainment settings.

=== Finnish ===
The Finnish language has a literary variant, literary Finnish, and a spoken variant, spoken Finnish. Both are considered a form of non-dialectal standard language, and are used throughout the country. Literary Finnish is a consciously created fusion of dialects for use as a literary language, which is rarely spoken at all, being confined to writing and official speeches.

=== Georgian ===
The Georgian language has a literary liturgical form, the Old Georgian language, while the vernacular spoken varieties are the Georgian dialects and other related Kartvelian languages like Svan language, Mingrelian language, and Laz language.

=== German ===
German differentiates between Hochdeutsch/Standarddeutsch (Standard German) and Umgangssprache (everyday/vernacular language). Amongst the differences are the regular use of the genitive case and the simple past tense Präteritum in written language. In vernacular German, genitive phrases ("des Tages") are frequently replaced with a construction of "von" + dative object ("von dem Tag") — comparable to English "the dog's tail" vs. "the tail of the dog". Likewise, the Präteritum ("ich ging") can be substituted with the perfect ("ich bin gegangen") to a certain degree. The preterite and genitive cases are still used in daily language, if rarely. Their use in vernacular can depend on the regional dialect and education of the speaker. People of higher education use the genitive more regularly in their casual speech, and the use of perfect instead of Präteritum is especially common in southern Germany, where the Präteritum is considered somewhat declamatory. The German Konjunktiv I / II ("er habe" / "er hätte") is also used more often in written form, and is replaced by the conditional ("er würde geben") in spoken language, although in some southern German dialects the Konjunktiv II is used more often. Generally there is a continuum between more dialectical varieties and more standard varieties in German, while colloquial German nonetheless tends to increase analytic elements at the expense of synthetic elements.

=== Greek ===
From the early nineteenth century until the mid-20th century, Katharevousa, a form of Greek, was used for literary purposes. In later years, Katharevousa was used only for official and formal purposes (such as politics, letters, official documents, and newscasting) while Dimotiki, 'demotic' or popular Greek, was the daily language. This created a diglossic situation until in 1976, Dimotiki was made the official language.

=== Hebrew ===
During the revival of the Hebrew language, spoken and literary Hebrew were revived separately, causing a dispersion between the two. The dispersion started to narrow sometime after the two movements merged, but substantial differences between the two still exist.

=== Irish and Scottish Gaelic ===
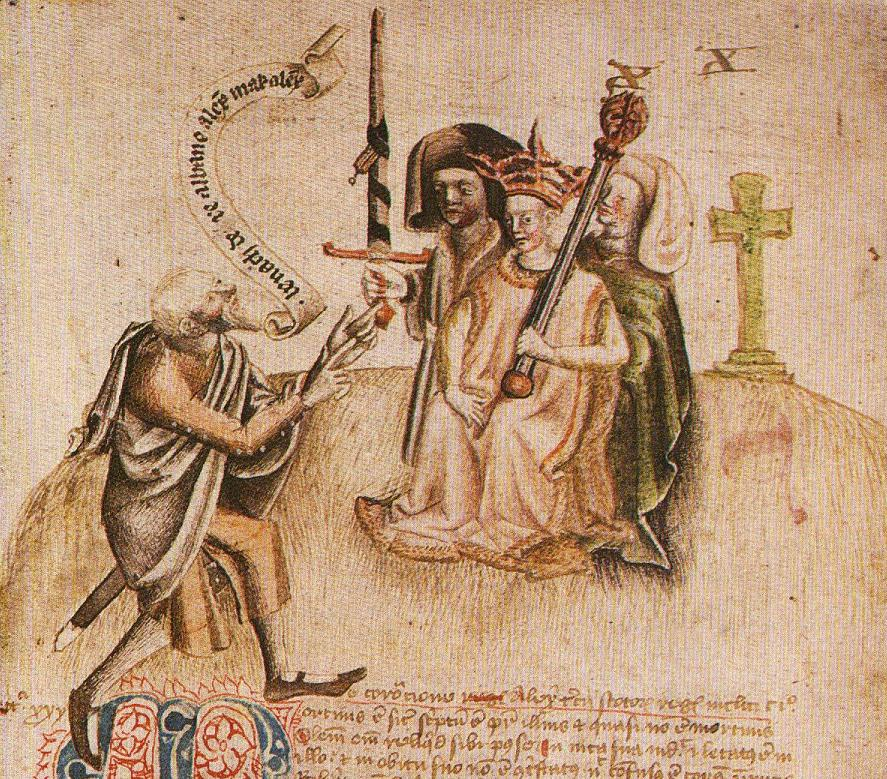
Coronation of Alexander III of Scotland at Scone in 1249. He is greeted by the ollamh rígh, the royal poet, who is addressing him with the proclamation Benach De Re Albanne ("God Bless the King of Scotland"); the poet goes on to recite Alexander's genealogy. Poets of this kind composed in Classical Gaelic, a literary form separate from the Scottish Gaelic or Irish vernaculars.

Early Modern Irish, also called Classical Gaelic or Classical Irish (Gaoidhealg) was a shared literary form of Gaelic that was in use by poets in Scotland and Ireland from the 13th century to the 18th century.

Before that time, the vernacular dialects of Ireland and Scotland were considered to belong to a single language, and in the late 12th century a highly formalized standard variant of that language was created for the use in Irish bardic poetry. The standard was created by medieval Gaelic poets based on the vernacular usage of the late 12th century and allowed a lot of dialectal forms that existed at that point in time, but was kept conservative and was taught virtually unchanged throughout later centuries. The grammar and metrical rules were described in a series of grammatical tracts and linguistic poems used for teaching in bardic schools.

=== Italian ===
Standard Italian evolved as a literary language, based principally on the Tuscan dialect, in part due to the prestige enjoyed by Florentine authors like Dante, Petrarch, Boccaccio, Machiavelli, and Francesco Guicciardini. Different languages were spoken throughout Italy, almost all of which were Romance languages which had developed in every region, due to the political and cultural fragmentation of the peninsula.

Now, it is the standard language of Italy, due to modern media and education, and many of Italy's other languages and dialects are dying out.

=== Japanese ===
Until the late 1940s, the prominent literary language in Japan was the Classical Japanese language (文語, bungo), which is based on the language spoken in Heian period (Late Old Japanese) and is different from the contemporary Japanese language in grammar and some vocabulary. It still has relevance for historians, literary scholars, and lawyers (many Japanese laws that survived World War II are still written in bungo, although there are ongoing efforts to modernize their language). Bungo grammar and vocabulary are occasionally used in modern Japanese for effect, and fixed form poetries like Haiku and Tanka are still mainly written in this form.

In the Meiji period, some authors started to use the colloquial form of the language in their literature. Following the government policy after the World War II, the standard form of contemporary Japanese language is used for most literature published since the 1950s. The standard language is based on the colloquial language in Tokyo area, and its literary stylistics in polite form differ little from its formal speech. Notable characteristics of literary language in contemporary Japanese would include more frequent use of Chinese origin words, less use of expressions against prescriptive grammar (such as "ら抜き言葉"), and use of non-polite normal form ("-だ/-である") stylistics that are rarely used in colloquial language.

=== Javanese ===
In the Javanese language, alphabet characters derived from the alphabets used to write Sanskrit, no longer in ordinary use, are used in literary words as a mark of respect.

=== Kannada ===
Kannada exhibits a strong diglossia, like Tamil, also characterised by three styles: a classical literary style modelled on the ancient language, a modern literary and formal style, and a modern colloquial form. These styles shade into each other, forming a diglossic continuum.

The formal style is generally used in formal writing and speech. It is, for example, the language of textbooks, of much of Kannada literature and of public speaking and debate. Novels, even popular ones, will use the literary style for all description and narration and use the colloquial form only for dialogue, if they use it at all. In recent times, however, the modern colloquial form has been making inroads into areas that have traditionally been considered the province of the modern literary style: for instance most cinema, theatre and popular entertainment on television and radio.

There are also many dialects of Kannada, Which are Dharwad Kannada of North Karnataka, Arebhashe of Dakshina Kannada and Kodagu, Kundakannada of Kundapura, Havyaka Kannada are major dialects.

=== Latin ===
Classical Latin was the literary register used in writing from 75 BC to the 3rd century AD, while Vulgar Latin was the common, spoken variety used across the Roman Empire. The Latin brought by Roman soldiers to Gaul, Iberia, or Dacia was not identical to the Latin of Cicero, and differed from it in vocabulary, syntax, and grammar. Some literary works with low-register language from the Classical Latin period give a glimpse into the world of early Vulgar Latin. The works of Plautus and Terence, being comedies with many characters who were slaves, preserve some early basilectal Latin features, as does the recorded speech of the freedmen in the Cena Trimalchionis by Petronius Arbiter. At the Third Council of Tours in 813, priests were ordered to preach in the vernacular language—either in the rustica lingua romanica (Vulgar Latin), or in the Germanic vernaculars—since the common people could no longer understand formal Latin.

=== Malay ===
The Malay language exists in a classical variety, two modern standard variety and several vernacular dialects.

=== Maltese ===
Maltese has a variety of dialects (including the Żejtun dialect, Qormi dialect and Gozitan amongst others) that co-exist alongside Standard Maltese. Literary Maltese, unlike Standard Maltese, features a preponderance of Semitic vocabulary and grammatical patterns; however, this traditional separation between Semitic and Romance influences in Maltese literature (especially Maltese poetry and Catholic liturgy on the island) is changing.

=== Manchu ===
Standard Manchu was based on the language spoken by the Jianzhou Jurchens during Nurhaci's time, while other unwritten Manchu dialects, such as that of Aigun and Sanjiazi, were spoken in addition to the related Xibe language.

=== Mongolian ===
The Classical Mongolian language was the high register used for religious and official purposes, while the various Mongolian dialects served as the low register, like Khalkha Mongolian, Chakhar Mongolian, Khorchin Mongolian, Kharchin Mongolian, Baarin Mongolian, Ordos Mongolian and the Buryat language. The Tibetan Buddhist canon was translated into Classical Mongolian. The Oirat Mongols who spoke the Oirat language and dialects like Kalmyk language or Torgut Oirat used a separate standard written with the Clear script.

The Mongolian language, based on Khalkha Mongolian, now serves as the high register in Mongolia itself while in Inner Mongolia a standard Mongolian based on Chakhar Mongolian serves as the high register for all Mongols in China. The Buryat language, which is seen as part of the Mongolian language, has been turned into a standard literary form in Russia.

=== N'Ko ===
N'Ko is a literary language devised by Solomana Kante in 1949 as a writing system for the Mande languages of West Africa. It blends the principal elements of the partially mutually intelligible Manding languages. The movement promoting N'Ko literacy was instrumental in shaping the Maninka cultural identity in Guinea, and has also strengthened the Mande identity in other parts of West Africa. N'Ko publications include a translation of the Qur'an, a variety of textbooks on subjects such as physics and geography, poetic and philosophical works, descriptions of traditional medicine, a dictionary, and several local newspapers.

=== Persian ===
Persian has been used continually as the literary language of major areas in Western Asia, the Caucasus, Central Asia and South Asia. The language written today remains essentially the same as that used by Ferdowsi with its variant colloquial dialects and forms. For many centuries, people belonging to the educated classes from the Bosphorus to the Bay of Bengal would be expected to know Persian. It is the language of culture (especially of poetry), from the Balkans to the Deccan, functioning as a lingua franca. Until the late 18th century, Persian was the dominant literary language of Georgia's elite. Persian has a particularly prominent place in Sufism.

=== Serbian ===
Slavonic-Serbian (slavenosrpski) was the literary language of Serbs in the Habsburg monarchy used from the mid-18th century to 1825. It was a linguistic blend of Church Slavonic of the Russian recension, vernacular Serbian (Štokavian dialect), and Russian. At the beginning of the 19th century, it was severely attacked by Vuk Karadžić and his followers, whose reformatory efforts formed modern literary Serbian based on the popular language, known as Serbo-Croatian.

=== Tagalog ===
Tagalog was the basis of the Filipino language; both share the same vocabulary and grammatical system and are mutually intelligible. However, there is a significant political and social history that underlies the reasons for differentiating between Tagalog and Filipino.

Modern Tagalog is derived from Archaic Tagalog, which was likely spoken during the Classical period, it was the language of the Mai State, Tondo Dynasty (according to the Laguna Copperplate Inscription) and southern Luzon. It was written using Baybayin, a syllabary which is a member of the Brahmic family, before the Spanish Romanised the alphabet beginning in the late 15th century. Tagalog was also the spoken language of the 1896 Philippine Revolution.

The 1987 Constitution maintains that Filipino is the country's national language and one of two official languages, alongside English. Today, Filipino is considered the proper term for the language of the Philippines, especially by Filipino-speakers who are not of Tagalog origin, with many referring to the Filipino language as "Tagalog-based". The language is taught in schools throughout the country and is the official language of education and business. Native Tagalog-speakers meanwhile comprise one of the largest linguistic and cultural groups of the Philippines, numbering an estimated 14 million.

=== Slavic languages ===
Notably, in Eastern European and Slavic linguistics, the term "literary language" has also been used as a synonym of "standard language".

=== Tamil ===
Tamil exhibits a strong diglossia, characterised by three styles: a classical literary style modelled on the ancient language, a modern literary and formal style and a modern colloquial form. These styles shade into each other, forming a diglossic continuum.

The modern literary style is generally used in formal writing and speech. It is, for example, the language of textbooks, of much of Tamil literature and of public speaking and debate. Novels, even popular ones, will use the literary style for all description and narration and use the colloquial form only for dialogue, if they use it at all. In recent times, however, the modern colloquial form has been making inroads into areas that have traditionally been considered the province of the modern literary style: for instance most cinema, theatre and popular entertainment on television and radio.

=== Tibetan ===
Classical Tibetan was the high register used universally by all Tibetans while the various mutually unintelligible Tibetic languages serve as the low register vernacular, like Central Tibetan language in Ü-Tsang (Tibet proper), Khams Tibetan in Kham, Amdo Tibetan in Amdo, Ladakhi language in Ladakh and Dzongkha in Bhutan. Classical Tibetan was used for official and religious purposes, such as in Tibetan Buddhist religious texts like the Tibetan Buddhist canon and taught and learned in monasteries and schools in Tibetan Buddhist regions.

Standard Tibetan, based on the Lhasa dialect, serves as the high register in China. In Bhutan, the Tibetan Dzongkha language has been standardised and replaced Classical Tibetan for official purposes and education, in Ladakh, the standard official language learned are now the unrelated languages Urdu and English, and in Baltistan, the Tibetan Balti language serves as the low register while the unrelated Urdu is the official language.

=== Uzbek and Uyghur ===
The Turkic Chagatai language served as the high register literary standard for Central Asian Turkic peoples, while the vernacular low register languages were the Uzbek language and Eastern Turki (Modern Uyghur). The Soviet Union abolished Chagatai as the literary standard and had the Uzbek language standardized as a literary language for, and the Taranchi dialect of Ili was chosen as the literary standard for Modern Uyghur, while other dialects like the Kashgar and Turpan dialects continue to be spoken.

=== Welsh ===
Like other languages, the modern spoken language tends to use simplified forms, for example using auxiliary verbs, as in English, to form tenses, in contrast to verb forms for each tense etc., similar to Latin.

=== Yorùbá ===
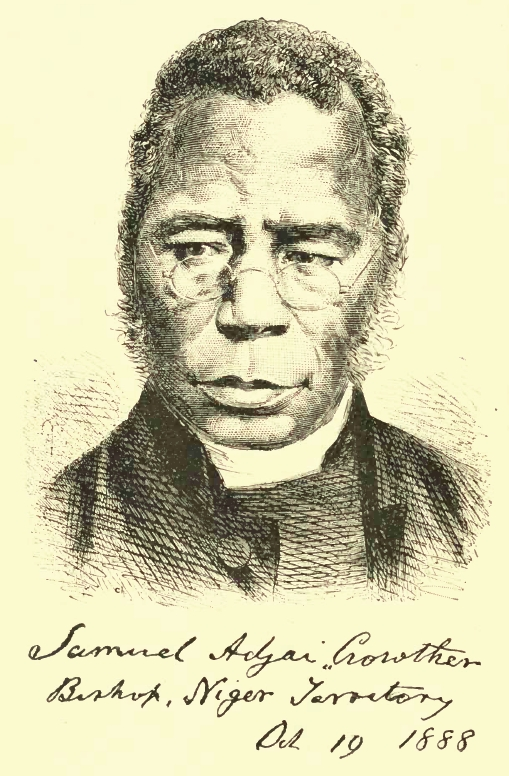
Samuel Crowther's Yorùbá grammar led to Standard Yoruba becoming a literary language.

Standard Yoruba is the literary form of the Yoruba language of West Africa, the standard variety learnt at school and that spoken by newsreaders on the radio. Standard Yoruba has its origin in the 1850s, when Samuel A. Crowther, native Yoruba and the first African Anglican Bishop in Nigeria, published a Yoruba grammar and started his translation of the Bible. Though for a large part based on the Ọyọ and Ibadan dialects, Standard Yoruba incorporates several features from other dialects. Additionally, it has some features peculiar to itself only, for example the simplified vowel harmony system, as well as foreign structures, such as calques from English which originated in early translations of religious works. The first novel in the Yorùbá language was Ogboju Ode ninu Igbo Irunmale (The Forest of A Thousand Demons), written in 1938 by Chief Daniel O. Fagunwa (1903–1963). Other writers in the Yorùbá language include: Senator Afolabi Olabimtan (1932–1992) and Akinwunmi Isola.

== See also ==
- Aureation
- Classical language
- Official language
- Sacred language
- Standard language
- Written language
- Acrolect
- List of languages by first written accounts

== Bibliography ==
- Crystal, David (ed.), The Cambridge Encyclopedia of the English Language (Cambridge, 2003) ISBN 0-521-53033-4
- Gould, Rebecca Ruth (2018). "Sweetening the Heavy Georgian Tongue: Jāmī in the Georgian-Persianate World". In d'Hubert, Thibaut; Papas, Alexandre (eds.). Jāmī in Regional Contexts: The Reception of ʿAbd al-Raḥmān Jāmī's Works in the Islamicate World, ca. 9th/15th-14th/20th Century. Brill. ISBN 978-9004386600.
- Matthee, Rudi (2009). "Was Safavid Iran an Empire?". Journal of the Economic and Social History of the Orient. 53 (1–2). Brill: 233–265. doi:10.1163/002249910X12573963244449. S2CID 55237025.
- McArthur, Tom (ed.), The Oxford Companion to the English Language (Oxford, 1992), ISBN 0-19-280637-8
- McArthur, Tom, The English Languages (Cambridge, 1998) ISBN 0-521-48582-7
