= Baarin Mongolian =

Dialect of Mongolian in Inner Mongolia

- Native to: China
- Region: Inner Mongolia
- Ethnicity: Baarins
- Language family: Mongolic: Central Mongolic; Buryat–Mongolian; Mongolian; Peripheral Mongolian?; Baarin Mongolian

Language codes
- ISO 639-3: None (mis)

Baarin (Mongolian ᠪᠠᠭᠠᠷᠢᠨ Baɣarin, Chinese 巴林 Bālín) is a dialect of Mongolian spoken mainly in Inner Mongolia.

== Location and classification ==
Baarin is spoken in the Baarin Right Banner, Baarin Left Banner, Ar Khorchin Banner and Ongniud Banner of Ulanhad and in the Jirin Banner of Tongliao in Inner Mongolia. It has been grouped together with Khorchin and Kharchin or as an intermediate variant between these two on the one hand and Chakhar, Khalkha and Ordos on the other hand. On the other hand, it is part of Southern Mongolian as far as its Standard language is concerned and has therefore been grouped into such a variety as well.

== Phonology ==
Baarin has the short vowel phonemes /ɑ, ə, i, ɔ, ʊ, o, u, ɛ, œ, ʏ, y/ and the corresponding long vowels. The consonant phonemes are /m, n, ŋ, p, pʰ, t, tʰ, tʃ, tʃʰ, x, k, s, ʃ, l, j, r, w/. That is, as in Khalkha and Khorchin, the basic phonation contrast in plosives and affricates is based on aspiration, not on voicedness. This even includes /k/. In contrast to Khalkha and akin to Khorchin, palatalized consonants have already lost their phoneme status and conveyed it to the new vowel phonemes /ɛ, œ, ʏ, y/.

== Morphology ==
The accusative takes the form /i/, e.g. /xəli/ 'language-Acc'. The genitive, on the other hand, tends to contain one /n/, but it is still based on /i/. Due to this, homophony with the accusative can occur in a few cases, e.g. ternə (accusative and genitive of the distal demonstrative), but not əni (proximal accusative) vs. ənni (proximal genitive). There is no allative and no cognate of the old sociative case, but an additional case in -tar < dotura 'inside' with fairly narrow meaning has been assumed.

== Bibliography ==
- Bayarmendü, Borǰigin (1997): Baɣarin aman ayalɣun-u sudulul. Kökeqota: Öbür mongɣul-un arad-un keblel-ün qoriy-a.
- Janhunen, Juha (2003): Mongol dialects. In: Juha Janhunen (ed.): The Mongolic languages. London: Routledge: 177–191.
- Luvsanvandan, Š. (1959): Mongol hel ajalguuny učir. In: Mongolyn sudlal 1.
- Sečenbaɣatur et al. (2005): Mongɣul kelen-ü nutuɣ-un ayalɣun-u sinǰilel-ün uduridqal. Kökeqota: Öbür mongɣul-un arad-un keblel-ün qoriy-a.
- Svantesson, Jan-Olof, Anna Tsendina, Anastasia Karlsson, Vivan Franzén (2005): The Phonology of Mongolian. New York: Oxford University Press.
