= Mongolian language in Inner Mongolia =

Peripheral Mongolian
- Native to: China
- Region: Inner Mongolia
- Ethnicity: Mongols in China
- Native speakers: 2.1 million (2022)
- Language family: Mongolic: Central Mongolic; Buryat–Mongolian; Mongolian; Peripheral Mongolian

Language codes
- ISO 639-3: mvf
- Glottolog: peri1253

In the Inner Mongolia Autonomous Region of China, the Mongolian language is the official provincial language (alongside Chinese). Mongols are the second largest ethnic group (after Han Chinese), comprising about 17 percent of the population. There are at least 4.1 million ethnic Mongols in Inner Mongolia, including subgroups like the Chahars, Ordos, Baarin, Khorchin, Kharchin, and Buryats. While there is a standardized dialect of the Mongolian language in Inner Mongolia (in contrast to the standard language in the state of Mongolia, where the Khalkha make up most of the population), different Mongolian dialects continue to be spoken by different subgroups of the Mongols. The name Peripheral Mongolian is used to describe the dialect group that covers the Mongolian dialects in Inner Mongolia.

== Overview ==
The Mongolian language is the most widely spoken and best-known member of the Mongolic language family. Most speakers of the Mongolian language reside in the independent state of Mongolia and the Inner Mongolia Autonomous Region of China. In Inner Mongolia, the Mongolian language is dialectally more diverse than in the state of Mongolia, although there is a standard dialect of the Mongolian language in the region based on the Chakhar Mongolian, which is phonologically close to the Khalkha Mongolian (the de facto national language of the Mongolian state). The Mongolian language in Inner Mongolia is generally written in the traditional Mongolian script, whereas the Mongolian Cyrillic alphabet is commonly used in the state of Mongolia. There are also ethnic Mongol residents in other parts of China (such as Xinjiang, Qinghai, and Northeast China), and the exact number of Mongolian speakers in China is unknown since there is no data available on the language proficiency of citizens in China.

=== Features ===
Mongolian in Inner Mongolia has the following features

1. /uj/ is realized as /yː/ except in Khalkha dialects

== Standard dialect ==
While there are different dialects of the Mongolian language as spoken by different subgroups of the Mongols (such as Chahars, Khorchin, and Kharchin) in the Inner Mongolia Autonomous Region of China, there is a standardized Mongolian dialect in the region, including a standard written language and standard pronunciation, as opposed to the standard language of the state of Mongolia. The traditional Mongolian script is used for the standard Mongolian dialect in Inner Mongolia.

Given its intended status, which was formally implemented and delimited at a conference in Ürümqi in 1979, the standard dialect has been the object of several grammars. This includes an eclectic grammar that specifically deals with normative spoken language and which is based on the Chakhar dialect as spoken in the Plain Blue Banner on which the normative Inner Mongolian pronunciation Standard sounds (Mongolian: ᠪᠠᠷᠢᠮᠵᠢᠶ᠎ᠠ
ᠠᠪᠢᠶ᠎ᠠ barimǰiy-a abiy-a) is based. But legally, the grammar of all Mongolian dialects in Inner Mongolia jointly provides the standard grammar. This is still a delimitation, as Buryat and Oirat speakers in China are obliged to use the standard Mongolian dialect in Inner Mongolia as their standard variety as well. To work as a school teacher, news anchor, etc., a special command of the standard Mongolian dialect in Inner Mongolia is required and tested. The test manual focuses mainly on pronunciation, but to some degree also on vocabulary, while syntax is stated to be tested, but left to the evaluators. To teach Mongolian, a score of more than 90% is needed, while teachers of other subjects are only required to obtain 80%, the minimum score for successful completion.

== Language status ==
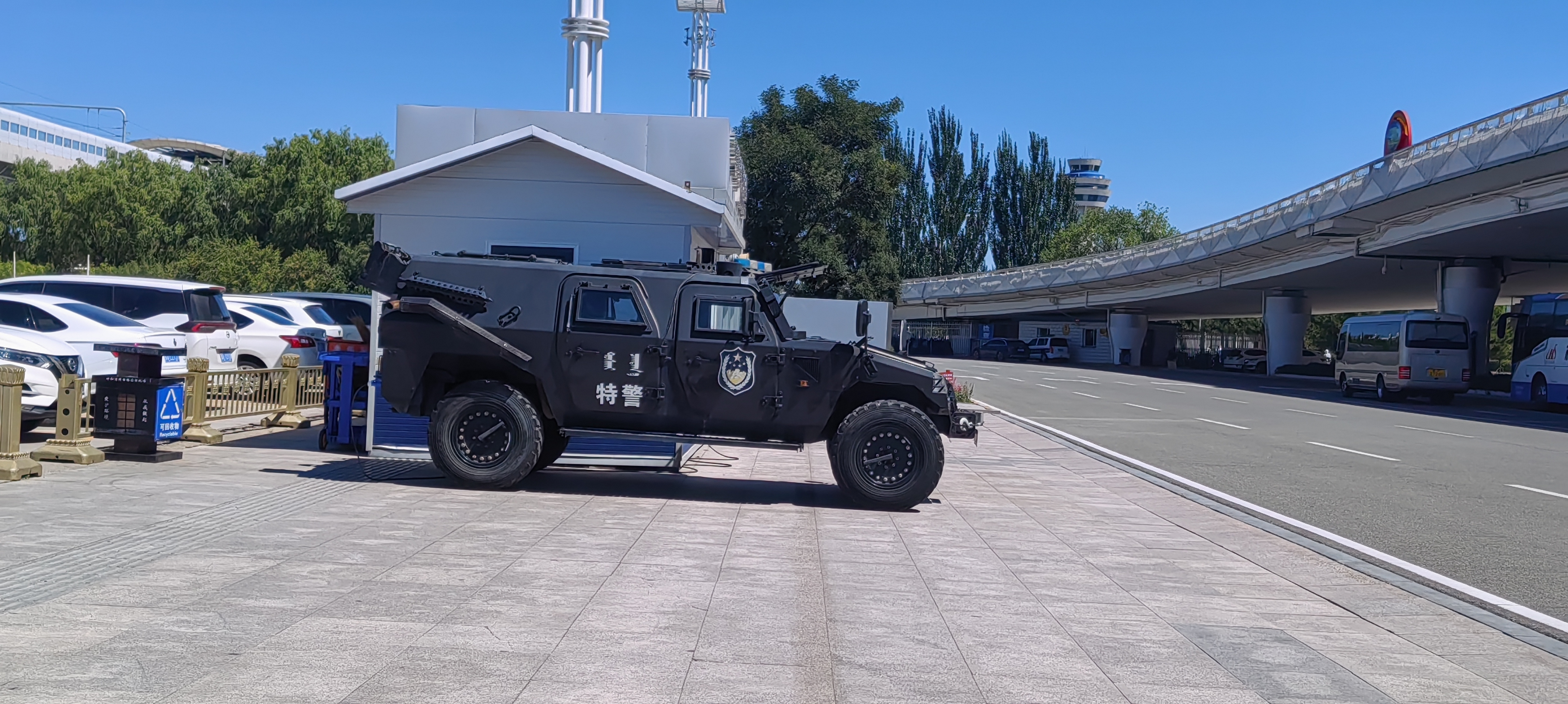
Inner Mongolian airport SWAT units vehicle labeled in bilingual Chinese and Mongolian scripts.

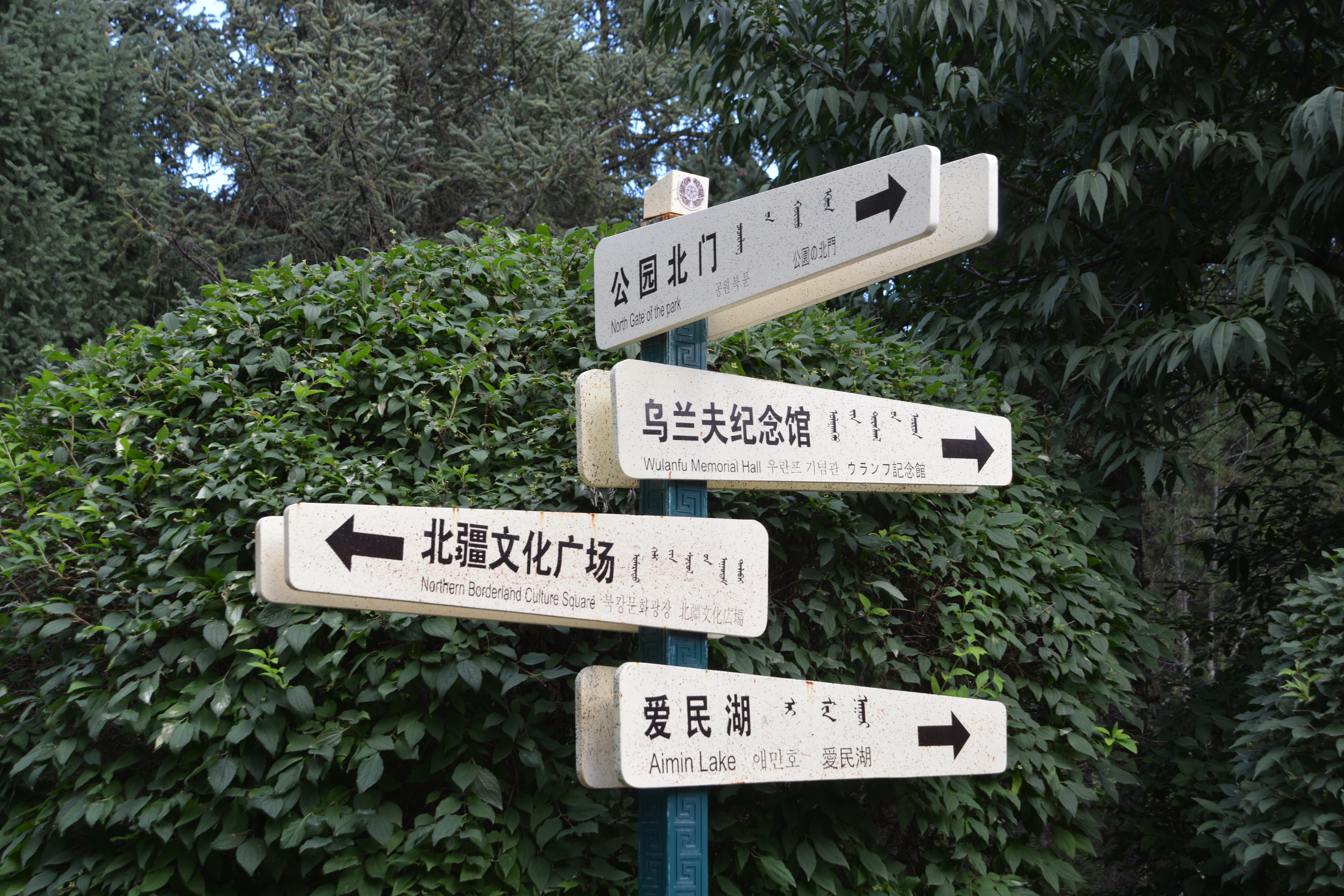
Quinquelingual (Chinese, Mongolian, English, Korean, Japanese) signs in Wulanfu Park, Hohhot.

According to the Constitution of China, the right to use the languages of minority ethnic groups, including Mongolian, is protected. In Inner Mongolia, an autonomous region to which ethnic Mongols are home, various subjects in elementary and middle schools could be taught in the Mongolian language. It preserves the traditional Mongolian script as its official alphabet, whereas the Cyrillic script is commonly used in the state of Mongolia.

However, the use of the Mongolian language in Inner Mongolia has witnessed periods of decline and revival over the last few hundred years. The language experienced a decline during the late Qing period, a revival between 1947 and 1965, a second decline during the Cultural Revolution between 1966 and 1976, a second revival between 1977 and 1992, and a third decline between 1995 and 2012. During the Cultural Revolution, Mongolian was labeled as part of the Four Olds; texts in Mongolian were burned, and bilingual education was suppressed.

In recent years, the language is in decline again with Mongols in China due to a Chinese government campaign of sinicization, which results in the Mongolian language being restricted and practically banned to a considerable extent in Inner Mongolia, notably in the educational system. From September 2020, three core subjects, namely language and literature, politics, and history, began to be taught only in Mandarin, the official language of China, which caused demonstrations among local students, their parents and people from the Mongolian country. As of September 2023, Mandarin has been deemed the only language of instruction for all subjects.

Although an unknown number of Mongols in China, such as the Tumets, may have completely or partially lost the ability to speak their language, they are still registered as ethnic Mongols and continue to identify themselves as ethnic Mongols. The children of inter-ethnic Mongol-Chinese marriages also claim to be and are registered as ethnic Mongols so they can benefit from the preferential policies for minorities in education, healthcare, family planning, school admissions, the hiring and promotion, the financing and taxation of businesses, and regional infrastructural support given to ethnic minorities in China.

== Proposed dialect group ==
A dialect group known as Peripheral Mongolian, also known as Inner Mongolian (ᠥᠪᠦᠷ
ᠮᠣᠩᠭᠣᠯ
ᠠᠶᠠᠯᠭᠣ Öbör mongɣol ayalɣu) or Southern Mongolian, is proposed within the taxonomy of the Mongolian language. It is assumed by most Inner Mongolia linguists and would be on the same level as the other three major dialect groups: Khalkha, Buryat, and Oirat. The proposed dialect group would consist of the dialects Chakhar, Ordos, Baarin, Khorchin, Kharchin and (possibly) Alasha that originated from Oirat. The varieties spoken in Xilin Gol which form a major dialect of their own right and are close to Khalkha are classified as belonging to Chakhar in this approach. Because the proposed dialect group would consist of all non-Buryat Mongolian varieties spoken in Inner Mongolia, this classification has been argued against by several linguists who hold that there is a dialect continuum between Khalkha and the Mongolian varieties in Inner Mongolia that rather favours grouping Chakhar, Ordos and Khalkha on the one hand and Khorchin and Kharchin on the other hand, or at least that "Mongolian proper" is an immediate member of Mongolian/Mongolic. On the other hand, the argument that the Mongolian language in Inner Mongolia is distinct is based on considerations such as the following:

- There is a standard dialect of Mongolian in Inner Mongolia of China, while Khalkha is the Standard language of the Mongolian state.
- Mongols in Inner Mongolia continue to use the Mongolian script, while Khalkhas have switched to Cyrillic script, which rather closely resembles the pronunciation of the Khalkha dialect.
- The Mongolian language in Inner Mongolia has been under strong influence from Chinese, while Khalkha has been under strong influence from Russian.

== See also ==
- Mongolian name
- Mongols in China

== Bibliography ==
- Bayancogtu (2007): Nutug-un ayalgun-u sinjilel. Hohhot.
- Buu, Manliang (2005): Monggol yarian-u kele jüi. Hohhot.
- Činggeltei (1999): Odu üj-e-jin mongɣul kelen-ü ǰüi. Kökeqota: Öbür mongɣul-un arad-un keblel-ün qorij-a. ISBN 7-204-04593-9.
- Iivonen, Antti; Harnud, Huhe (2005), "Acoustical comparison of the monophthong systems in Finnish, Mongolian and Udmurt", Journal of the International Phonetic Association, 35 (1): 59–71, doi:10.1017/S002510030500191X, S2CID 145733117
- Janhunen, Juha (2003): Mongol dialects. In: Juha Janhunen (ed.): The Mongolic languages. London: Routledge: 177–191.
- Luvsanvandan, Š. (1959): Mongol hel ajalguuny učir. In: Mongolyn sudlal 1.
- [Committee (for the)] Mongɣul kelen-ü barimǰiya abiyan-u kiri kem-i silɣaqu kötülbüri (2003): Mongɣul kelen-ü barimǰiya abiyan-u kiri kem-i silɣaqu kötülbüri.
- Öbür mongɣul-un yeke surɣaɣuli (2005 [1964]): Odu üy-e-yin mongɣul kele. Kökeqota: Öbür mongɣul-un arad-un keblel-ün qoriy-a. ISBN 7-204-07631-1.
- Qaserdeni, Гunčugsüreng, Sungrub, Sečen, Davadaɣva, Toɣuga, Naranbatu (1996): Orčin čaɣ-un mongɣul kele. ǰasaču nayiraɣuluɣsan debter. Ulaɣanqada: Öbür mongɣul-un surɣan kümüǰil-un keblel-ün qoriy-a. ISBN 7-5311-2217-0.
- Qaserdeni, Sečen, Buu Manliyang, Sangǰai, Tiyen Siyuu, Dorǰi (2006): Mongɣul yariyan-u kele ǰüi. Kökeqota: Öbür mongɣul-un arad-un keblel-ün qoriy-a. ISBN 7-204-07321-5.
- Secen et al. (1998): Monggol helen-ü nutug-un ayalgun-u sinjilel. Beijing.
- [Sečenbaɣatur] Sechenbaatar (2003): The Chakhar dialect of Mongol - A morphological description. Helsinki: Finno-Ugrian society.
- Sečenbaɣatur et al. (2005): Mongɣul kelen-ü nutuɣ-un ayalɣun-u sinǰilel-ün uduridqal. Kökeqota: Öbür mongɣul-un arad-un keblel-ün qoriy-a.
- Svantesson, Jan-Olof, Anna Tsendina, Anastasia Karlsson, Vivan Franzén (2005): The Phonology of Mongolian. New York: Oxford University Press.
