= Antoine Mostaert =

Belgian Roman Catholic missionary and mongolist

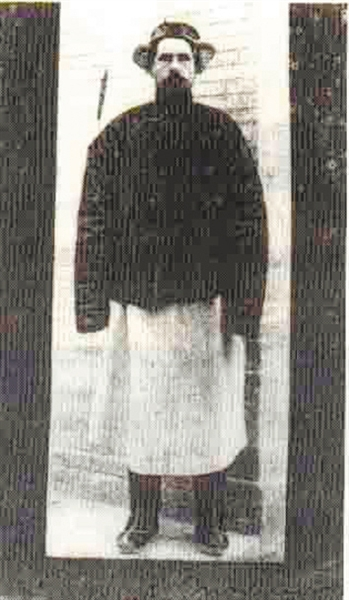
- Born: August 10, 1881; Brugge, Belgium
- Died: July 2, 1971 (aged 89); Tienen, Belgium
- Other names: Tiyen Baγsi, Nom-un Baγsi Tiyen

Chinese name
- Traditional Chinese: 田清波
Transcriptions
Standard Mandarin
- Hanyu Pinyin: Tían Qīngbō
- Wade–Giles: T'ien Ch'ingpo

Antoon Jules Edmond Marie Joseph Mostaert (10 August 1881 – 2 July 1971), better known as Antoine Mostaert, was a Belgian Roman Catholic missionary in China who studied the Ordos Mongols and their language.

== Life ==
Antoine Mostaert was born in Bruges on 10 August 1881. There, he attended the Sint-Lodedwijkscollege, where he studied Latin and Greek during his Secondary education. Afterwards, he joined the CICM Missionaries, and was ordained priest.

As a seminarian in Belgium he studied Chinese, which he came to know well. He also taught himself Mongolian using Isaac Jacob Schmidt's Grammatik der mongolischen Sprache (St. Petersburg, 1831) and a Mongolian edition of the New Testament.

From 1906 until 1925, he served as a missionary in the town of Boro Balγasu in the southern Ordos region. His Mongol name was Tiyen Baγsi (Тиен Багш) or Nom-un Baγsi Tiyen (Номын багш Тиен) — meaning "Teacher Tian" or "Teacher of the Book Tian"— deriving from his Chinese name Tían Qīngbō (田清波).

From 1925-1948 he lived in Beijing, where he devoted himself primarily to scholarship. In 1948 he moved to the United States, where he lived until his retirement, returning to Belgium in 1965. He died in Tienen on 2 July 1971.

== Work ==
His early work concentrated on Ordos Mongolian, with studies of phonology and the compilation of a dictionary. He also translated Catholic works from Chinese into Mongolian. The Monguor language formed another field of study.

In addition to linguistics he worked on ethnography and folklore. In 1926 he began work on an analysis of the Secret History of the Mongols. Overall, Mostaert seems to have had the most extensive command of Mongol of any twentieth century Western scholar, derived from his decades living among the Ordos Mongols as a pastor. Nicholas Poppe called him "...the most outstanding scholar in the field of Mongolian studies." Mostaert was particularly prolific as a consultant aiding other scholars, both Chinese and Western, and his scholarly impact cannot be judged solely from his formal publications. His main disciple was Henry Serruys, who has worked extensively on the history of Mongol-Ming relations.

The private library and papers of Mostaert are kept at the Scheut Memorial Library in Leuven, Belgium.

== Major works ==
- (1937) Textes oraux ordos, recueillis et publiés avec introduction, notes morphologiques, commentaries et glossaire [=Oral Ordos texts, collected and published with an introduction, morphological notes, commentaries and glossary], Peking: Fu Jen Catholic University, 1937
- (1941-4) Dictionnaire ordos [=Ordos dictionary], Peking: Fu Jen Catholic University, 1941-4
- (1947) Folklore ordos [=Ordos folklore], Peking: Fu Jen Catholic University, 1947
- (1950-2, 1953) Sur quelques passages de l'Histoire Secrète des Mongols, published separately in HJAS, 1950-2, in one volume, 1953 [=On select passages of the Secret History of the Mongols]

He also worked extensively on the Huayi yiyu (Chinese: 華夷譯語), the "Chinese-Barbarian Dictionary" of the Bureau of Translators, which like the Secret History took the form of a Mongol text both transcribed and translated into Chinese. This work was never published by him, but appeared posthumously in 1977 edited by Igor de Rachewiltz as:

- Le matériel Mongol du Houa i i iu de Houng-ou (1389) [=The Mongol Material of the Huayi Yiyu of Hongwu (1389)], Bruxelles: Institut Belge des Hautes Études Chinoises, 1977

== Sources ==
- Elisséeff, Serge (1956). "The Reverend Antoine Mostaert, C.I.C.M.". Harvard Journal of Asiatic Studies. 19 (1/2): vii–xiv. JSTOR 2718485 – via JSTOR.
- van Hecken, Joseph (1972). "Antoine Mostaert, CICM (1881-1971), Apôtre des Mongols et doyen des études mongoles". Neue Zeitschrift für Missionswissenschaft = Nouvelle revue de science missionaire. 28.
- Sagaster, Klaus, ed. (1999). "Antoine Mostaert (1881-1971). C.I.C.M. Missionary and Scholar". Leuven Chinese Studies. 4–5. Leuven: Ferdinand Verbiest Foundation, K.U. Leuven.
