= Shar Darkhad =

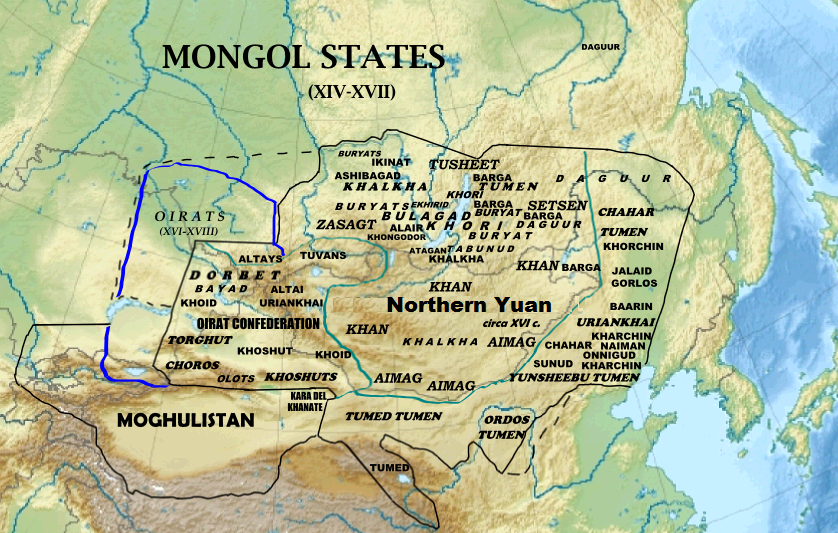

Regions with significant populations

Languages
- Ordos Mongolian

Religion
- Predominantly Tibetan Buddhism

Related ethnic groups
- Mongols, Mongols in China, Ordos Mongols

The Shar Darkhad, Dalhut, or Darhut (Mongolian for "Untouchables", "Protected Ones"; Chinese: 达尔扈特, pinyin: Dá'ěrhùtè) are a subgroup of Mongol people living mainly in Inner Mongolia in northern China.

In 1947, 2071 people from 462 households were eligible to be Darkhad. They were liable for maintaining the Great Khan's mausoleum at their own expense prior to the erection of a permanent government-owned structure in 1954–6. The Darkhad believe they are the direct descendants of the soul guards of Genghis Khan.

== See also ==
- Mausoleum of Genghis Khan
