= Ar Horqin Banner =

Ar'horqin Banner 阿鲁科尔沁旗 • ᠠᠷᠤ ᠬᠣᠷᠴᠢᠨ ᠬᠣᠰᠢᠭᠤ
- Banner
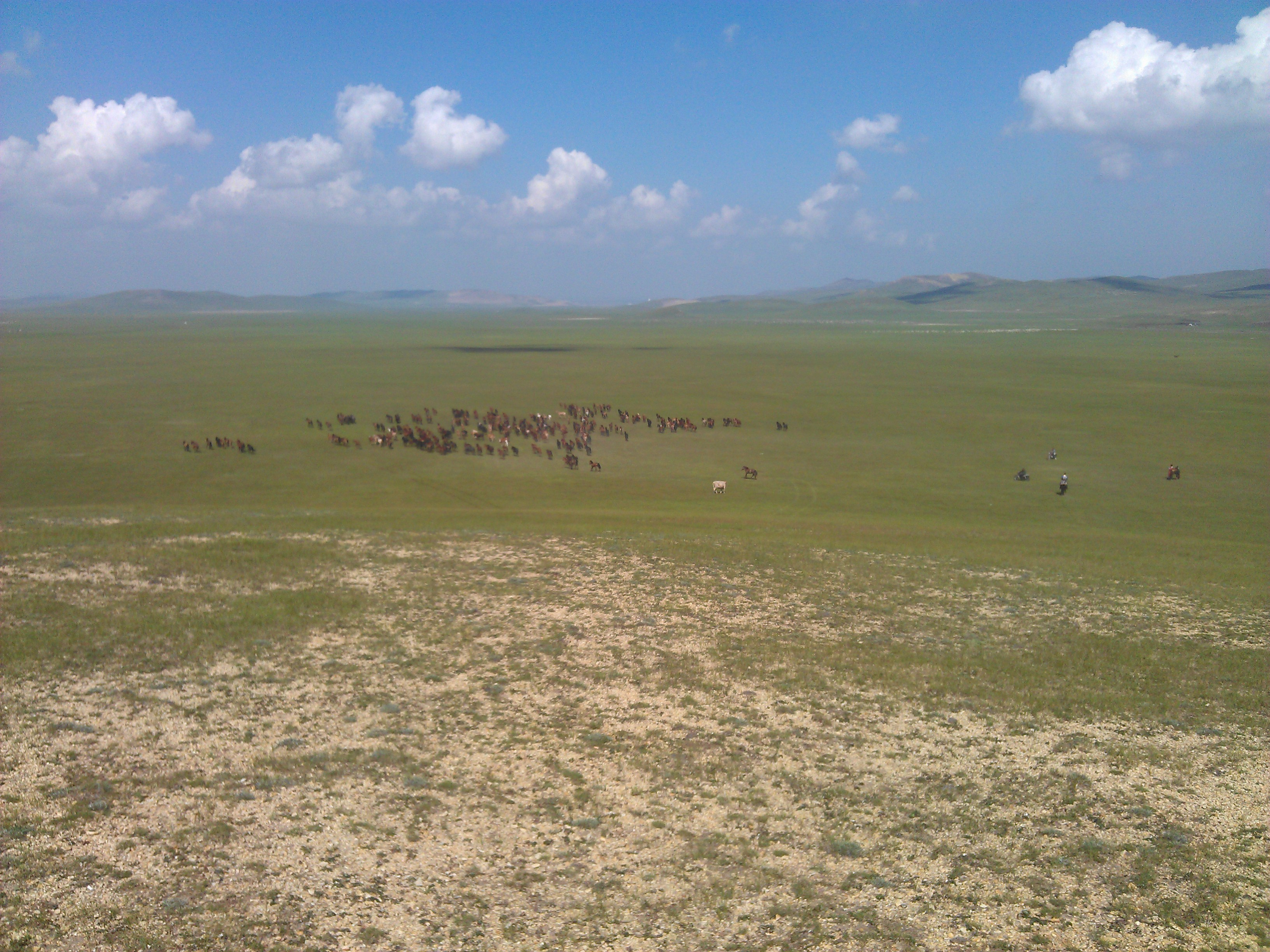

- Location within Inner Mongolia Location within China
- Coordinates: 43°52′N 120°04′E
- Country: China
- Autonomous region: Inner Mongolia
- Prefecture-level city: Chifeng
- Banner seat: Tianshan Town

Area
  - Total: 13,240 km^{2} (5,110 sq mi)
- Elevation: 378 m (1,240 ft)

Population (2020)
  - Total: 240,360
  - Density: 18.15/km^{2} (47.02/sq mi)
- Time zone: UTC+8 (China Standard)
- Website: www.alkeqq.gov.cn

Ar Horqin Banner

Chinese name
- Simplified Chinese: 阿鲁科尔沁旗
- Traditional Chinese: 阿魯科爾沁旗
Transcriptions
Standard Mandarin
- Hanyu Pinyin: Ālǔ Kē'ěrqìn Qí

Mongolian name
- Mongolian Cyrillic: Ар хорчин хошуу
- Mongolian script: ᠠᠷᠤ ᠬᠣᠷᠴᠢᠨ ᠬᠣᠰᠢᠭᠤ
Transcriptions
- SASM/GNC: Aru Qorčin qosiɣu

Ar Horqin Banner (Mongolian: ᠠᠷᠤ ᠬᠣᠷᠴᠢᠨ ᠬᠣᠰᠢᠭᠤ; Chinese: 阿鲁科尔沁旗) is a banner of eastern Inner Mongolia, China. It is under the administration of Chifeng City, about 200 kilometres (120 mi) to the south-southwest. The banner lies on China National Highway 303, running from Ji'an, Jilin to Xilinhot, Inner Mongolia. The Mongolian dialect spoken in Ar Khorchin is not Khorchin, as the name suggests, but Baarin.

== Demographics ==
The proportion of nationalities in Ar Horqin Banner (2020)
Nationality	Percentage
Han	57.6%
Mongols	40.3%
Manchus	1.9%
Hui people	0.1%
Others	0.0%
Source of the population statistics :

== Administrative divisions ==
Ar Horqin Banner is made up of 2 subdistricts, 7 towns, 3 townships, and 4 sums.

Name	Simplified Chinese	Hanyu Pinyin	Mongolian (Hudum Script)	Mongolian (Cyrillic)	Administrative division code
Subdistricts
Han Ul Subdistrict	罕乌拉街道	Hǎnwūlā Jiēdào	ᠬᠠᠨ ᠠᠭᠤᠯᠠ ᠵᠡᠭᠡᠯᠢ ᠭᠤᠳᠤᠮᠵᠢ	Хан уул зээл гудамж	150421403
U Moron Subdistrict	欧沐沦街道	Ōumùlún Jiēdào	ᠤᠤ ᠮᠥᠷᠡᠨ ᠵᠡᠭᠡᠯᠢ ᠭᠤᠳᠤᠮᠵᠢ	Уу мөрөн зээл гудамж	150421404
Towns
Tianshan Town (Qabag Town)	天山镇	Tiānshān Zhèn	ᠴᠢᠪᠠᠭ᠎ᠠ ᠪᠠᠯᠭᠠᠰᠤ	Чавга балгас	150421100
Tianshankou Town	天山口镇	Tiānshānkǒu Zhèn	ᠲᠢᠶᠠᠨ ᠱᠠᠨ ᠺᠧᠦ ᠪᠠᠯᠭᠠᠰᠤ	Даяан шин кев балгас	150421101
Shuangsheng Town	双胜镇	Shuāngshèng Zhèn	ᠱᠤᠸᠠᠩ ᠱᠧᠩ ᠪᠠᠯᠭᠠᠰᠤ	Сойн шен балгас	150421102
Hund Town	坤都镇	Kūndū Zhèn	ᠬᠤᠨᠲᠤ ᠪᠠᠯᠭᠠᠰᠤ	Хонд балгас	150421103
Bayan Hua Town	巴彦花镇	Bāyànhuā Zhèn	ᠪᠠᠶᠠᠨᠬᠤᠸᠠ ᠪᠠᠯᠭᠠᠰᠤ	Баянхуа балгас	150421104
Xugin Town	绍根镇	Shàogēn Zhèn	ᠱᠤᠤᠭᠢᠨ ᠪᠠᠯᠭᠠᠰᠤ	Шуугин балгас	150421105
Jagastai Town	扎嘎斯台镇	Zhāgāsītái Zhèn	ᠵᠢᠭᠠᠰᠤᠲᠠᠢ ᠪᠠᠯᠭᠠᠰᠤ	Загастай балгас	150421106
Townships
Xinmin Township	新民乡	Xīnmín Xiāng	ᠰᠢᠨ ᠮᠢᠨ ᠰᠢᠶᠠᠩ	Шин мин шиян	150421200
Xianfeng Township	先锋乡	Xiānfēng Xiāng	ᠰᠢᠶᠠᠨ ᠹᠧᠩ ᠰᠢᠶᠠᠩ	Шиан фен шиян	150421201
Ulan Had Township	乌兰哈达乡	Wūlánhādá Xiāng	ᠤᠯᠠᠭᠠᠨᠬᠠᠳᠠ ᠰᠢᠶᠠᠩ	Улаанахта шиян	150421205
Sums
Han Som Sum	罕苏木苏木	Hǎnsūmù Sūmù	ᠬᠠᠨᠰᠦᠮ᠎ᠡ ᠰᠤᠮᠤ	Хансм сум	150421202
Saihan Tal Sum	赛罕塔拉苏木	Sàihǎntǎlā Sūmù	ᠰᠠᠢᠬᠠᠨᠲᠠᠯ᠎ᠠ ᠰᠤᠮᠤ	Сайханатал сум	150421203
Balqirud Sum	巴拉奇如德苏木	Bālāqírúdé Sūmù	ᠪᠠᠯᠴᠢᠷᠤᠳ ᠰᠤᠮᠤ	Балчрут сум	150421204
Bayan Ondor Sum	巴彦温都尔苏木	Bāyànwēndū'ěr Sūmù	ᠪᠠᠶᠠᠨ᠌ᠠᠥᠨᠳᠥᠷ ᠰᠤᠮᠤ	Баянүүндор сум	150421206

Other:

- Light Industry and Food Industry Park (轻工食品产业园)
- New Energy Industrial Park (新能源产业园)
- Xugin Coal Carbon and Coal Chemical Industry Park (绍根煤碳及煤化工产业园)

== Climate ==
Climate data for Ar Horqin Banner, elevation 429 m (1,407 ft), (1991–2020 normals, extremes 1981–2010)
Month	Jan	Feb	Mar	Apr	May	Jun	Jul	Aug	Sep	Oct	Nov	Dec	Year
Record high °C (°F)	10.3 (50.5)	19.5 (67.1)	28.7 (83.7)	35.1 (95.2)	39.8 (103.6)	42.7 (108.9)	39.4 (102.9)	39.2 (102.6)	36.4 (97.5)	30.9 (87.6)	20.9 (69.6)	12.6 (54.7)	42.7 (108.9)
Mean daily maximum °C (°F)	−5.5 (22.1)	−0.8 (30.6)	6.8 (44.2)	16.6 (61.9)	24.1 (75.4)	28.2 (82.8)	30.1 (86.2)	28.8 (83.8)	23.9 (75.0)	15.1 (59.2)	3.5 (38.3)	−4.4 (24.1)	13.9 (57.0)
Daily mean °C (°F)	−13.3 (8.1)	−8.8 (16.2)	−0.7 (30.7)	9.4 (48.9)	17.3 (63.1)	22.0 (71.6)	24.4 (75.9)	22.5 (72.5)	16.4 (61.5)	7.6 (45.7)	−3.5 (25.7)	−11.5 (11.3)	6.8 (44.3)
Mean daily minimum °C (°F)	−19.6 (−3.3)	−15.8 (3.6)	−8.0 (17.6)	1.6 (34.9)	9.7 (49.5)	15.3 (59.5)	18.5 (65.3)	16.1 (61.0)	8.9 (48.0)	0.5 (32.9)	−9.4 (15.1)	−17.3 (0.9)	0.0 (32.1)
Record low °C (°F)	−35.7 (−32.3)	−31.3 (−24.3)	−28.9 (−20.0)	−13.7 (7.3)	−4.0 (24.8)	3.3 (37.9)	8.1 (46.6)	3.4 (38.1)	−2.5 (27.5)	−12.8 (9.0)	−29.1 (−20.4)	−32.3 (−26.1)	−35.7 (−32.3)
Average precipitation mm (inches)	1.5 (0.06)	1.8 (0.07)	4.6 (0.18)	11.5 (0.45)	33.4 (1.31)	59.6 (2.35)	115.9 (4.56)	56.3 (2.22)	29.6 (1.17)	13.1 (0.52)	4.8 (0.19)	1.8 (0.07)	333.9 (13.15)
Average precipitation days (≥ 0.1 mm)	1.7	1.4	2.6	3.7	7.3	11.3	11.7	8.7	5.9	3.6	2.5	1.8	62.2
Average snowy days	2.3	2.3	3.4	1.4	0.1	0	0	0	0	1.3	2.8	2.6	16.2
Average relative humidity (%)	49	41	37	33	37	52	64	64	54	46	49	51	48
Mean monthly sunshine hours	218.5	230.5	281.6	280.4	302.3	293.6	293.6	291.7	275.8	256.5	207.0	198.0	3,129.5
Percentage possible sunshine	75	77	76	69	66	64	63	68	74	76	72	72	71
Source: China Meteorological Administration
