= Xinjie =

Xinjie may refer to:

- New Territories (pinyin: Xīnjiè), Hong Kong
- Xinjie Town, Jiayu County, Hubei
- Xinjie Town, Sui County, Hubei
- Xinjie Town, Ejin Horo Banner, Ordos Prefecture, Inner Mongolia; location of the Mausoleum of Genghis Khan
- Xinjie Township, Yuanyang County, Yunnan
- Xinjie Hui ethnic township, Guide County, Qinghai
- Xinjie Subdistrict, Yixing, Jiangsu
- Xinjie Village, Fangyuan, Changhua County, Taiwan
- Xinjie Village, Mingjian, Nantou County, Taiwan
- Xinjie Village, Beigang, Yunlin County, Taiwan

== People with the name ==
- Huang Hsin-chieh (pinyin: Huáng Xìnjiè; 1928–1999), Taiwanese politician
- Angelica Lee (pinyin: Lǐ Xīnjié; born 1976), Malaysian singer
- Ji Xinjie (born 1997), Chinese swimmer
