= Khishigten =

Hishigten
- Territories of the Khishigten in 1911

Regions with significant populations

Religion
- Tibetan Buddhism, Mongolian shamanism

Related ethnic groups
- Mongols, Southern Mongols

The Hishigten (Mongolian: ᠬᠡᠰᠢᠭᠲᠡᠨ Хишигтэн; simplified Chinese: 克什克腾部; traditional Chinese: 克什克騰部) are one of the Southern Mongol ethnic groups. Today, they live in Heshigten Banner of China.

== Ethnonym ==
The ethnic name Hishigten is formed by adding the affix -ten to the Altaic word kešik meaning luck, prosperity, grace.

== History ==
They are believed to be the descendants of the Kheshig, the imperial guard of the Mongol Empire. The Hishigtens were the main core of the Mongol troops, subordinate only to Genghis Khan and in wartime became the main regiment, and in peacetime they performed the duties of personal guard of the rulers and their headquarters led by Genghis Khan. Mongol rulers revered the Hishigtens and showed them special trust. The descendants of the Hishigten, who represented the main core of the troops of the Great Mongol State and the Yuan State and were the main guardians of the rulers and their headquarters and palaces, formed the modern Hishigten ethnic group.

== See also ==
- Demographics of China
- Mongols in China
- List of medieval Mongolian tribes and clans
- Southern Mongolian dialect
