= Khorchin Mongolian =

Dialect of Mongolian spoken in eastern Inner Mongolia

Khorchin
- Native to: China
- Region: Hinggan League and Tongliao, Inner Mongolia
- Ethnicity: 2.08 million Khorchin Mongols (2000)
- Native speakers: (undated figure of >1 million)
- Language family: Mongolic: Central Mongolic; Buryat–Mongolian; Mongolian; Peripheral Mongolian; Khorchin

Language codes
- ISO 639-3: –
- Glottolog: None
- IETF: mvf-u-sd-cnnm22

The Khorchin dialect (Mongolian ᠬᠣᠷᠴᠢᠨ Qorčin, Chinese 科尔沁 Kē'ěrqìn) is a variety of Mongolian spoken in the east of Inner Mongolia, namely in Hinggan League, in the north, north-east and east of Hinggan and in all but the south of the Tongliao region. There were 2.08 million Khorchin Mongols in China in 2000, so the Khorchin dialect may well have more than one million speakers, making it the largest dialect of Inner Mongolia.

== Phonology ==
=== Consonants ===
Khorchin consonant phonemes (Note: Bayančoγtu sometimes uses other symbols.)
		Labial	Coronal	Palatal	Velar
Nasal		m	n		ŋ
Stop	voiceless	p	t	t͡ʃ	k
Stop	aspirated	pʰ	tʰ		kʰ
Fricative			s	ʃ	x
Approximant		w	l	j	
Trill			r		

Historical /t͡ʃʰ/ has become modern /ʃ/, and in some varieties, /s/ is replaced by /tʰ/. Then, *u (<*ʊ<*u) has regressively assimilated to /ɑ/ before *p, e.g. *putaha (Written Mongolian budaγ-a) > pata ‘rice’. However, less systematic changes that pertain only to a number of words are far more notable, e.g. *t͡ʃʰital 'capacity'> Khorchin /xɛtl/. This last example also illustrates that Khorchin allows for the consonant nuclei /l/ and /n/ (cp. [ɔln] 'many').

=== Vowels ===
/ɑ/, /ɑː/, /ɛ/, /ɛː/, /ʊ/, /ʊː/, /u/, /uː/, /y/, /yː/, /i/, /iː/, /ɔ/, /ɔː/, /œ/, /œː/, /ə/,/əː/, /ɚ/ (Note: Bayančoγtu also assumes a phoneme /ё/ (~ [ɤ]), but following the analysis of Svantesson et al. 2005 that claims that Mongolian (except for Ordos) only distinguishes phonemic and non-phonemic vowels in non-initial syllables, we arrive at an analysis where [ɤ] and [ə] are in complementary distribution, thus constituting a single phoneme. We thus arrive at the similar phoneme system as that of Sečenbaγatur et al. 2005: 317 who, however, don't mention the vowel /ɚ/ that is restricted to loanwords and doesn't play a role in the vowel harmony system of Khorchin.)

The large vowel system developed through the depalatalization of consonants that phonemicized formerly allomorphic vowels, hence /œ/ and /ɛ/. On the other hand, *ö is absent, e.g. Proto-Mongolic *ɵŋke > Kalmyk /ɵŋ/, Khalkha /oŋk/ 'colour', but Khorchin /uŋ/, thus merging with /u/. /y/ is absent in the native words of some varieties and /ɚ/ is completely restricted to loanwords from Chinese, but as these make up a very substantial part of Khorchin vocabulary, it is not feasible to postulate a separate loanword phonology. This also resulted in a vowel harmony system that is rather different from Chakhar and Khalkha: /u/ may appear in non-initial syllables of words without regard for vowel harmony, as may /ɛ/ (e.g. /ɑtu/ 'horses' and /untʰɛ/ 'expensive'; Khalkha would have /ɑtʊ/ 'horses' and /untʰe/). On the other hand, /u/ still determines a word as front-vocalic when appearing in the first syllable, which doesn't hold for /ɛ/ and /i/. In some subdialects, /ɛ/ and /œ/ which originated from palatalized /a/ and /ɔ/, have changed vowel harmony class according to their acoustic properties and become front vowels in the system, and the same holds for their long counterparts. E.g. *mori-bar 'by horse' > Khorchin [mœːrœr] vs. Jalaid subdialect [mœːrər].

== Morphology ==
Khorchin uses the old comitative /-lɛ/ to delimit an action within a certain time. A similar function is fulfilled by the suffix /-ɑri/ that is, however, restricted to environments in the past stratum. In contrast to other Mongolian varieties, in Khorchin Chinese verbs can be directly borrowed; other varieties have to borrow Chinese verbs as Mongolian nouns and then derive these to verbs. Compare the new loan /t͡ʃɑŋlu-/ 'to ask for money' < zhāngluó (张罗) with the older loan /t͡ʃəːl-/ 'to borrow' < jiè (借) that is present in all Mongolian varieties and contains the derivational suffix /-l-/.
