= Ordos Mongols =

- Territories of the Ordos in 1911

Regions with significant populations
- China: 123,000 (1982)

Languages
- Ordos dialect of Mongolian

Religion
- Tibetan Buddhism and Atheism

Related ethnic groups
- Mongols and Mongols in China

The Ordos (Mongolian: ᠣᠷᠳᠤᠰ; Chinese: 鄂尔多斯部) are a subgroup of the Mongols which live in Ordos, Inner Mongolia, China. They are named after the Ordo palace.

The Three Tribes of Uriyangkhaid, Tümed in north Shanxi, Ordos Mongols in Ordos and north of Shaanxi extended southward beyond the Ming defense zone between the 14th and 15th centuries. Since 1510, the Ordos were ruled by descendants of Batumongke Dayan Khan.

The Ordos Mongols believe that they have been responsible for the shrine of Genghis Khan since their inception. However, the modern place where mausoleum of Genghis Khan located is inhabited by the Shar Darkhads because the Ordos Mongols were forced to be resettled outside Ordos grasslands. Traditionally, Ordos territory is divided into 7 banners.

Their number reached 64,000 in 1950 and a possible current estimate of the Ordos people might be less than 100,000.
