= Khalkha Mongolian =

De facto standard dialect of Mongolian

Khalkha
- Халх аялгуу/Khalkh ayalguu/ᠬᠠᠯᠬ᠎ᠠ ᠠᠶᠠᠯᠭᠤ
- Pronunciation: [χaɬχ ai̯ɮɢʊ́]
- Native to: Mongolia, Kyrgyzstan, Russia
- Region: widespread in Mongolia
- Ethnicity: Khalkha Mongols
- Native speakers: 2.9 million (2020 Census)
- Language family: Mongolic: Central; Buryat–Mongolian; Mongolian; Khalkha
- Dialects: see below
- Writing system: Mongolian Cyrillic alphabet

Official status
- Official language in: Mongolia
- Recognised minority language in: Kyrgyzstan; Russia

Language codes
- ISO 639-3: khk
- Glottolog: halh1238

Khulan speaking Khalkha Mongolian (Wikitongues, 2016)

The Khalkha dialect (Note: Mongolian: Халх аялгуу / Khalkh ayalguu / ᠬᠠᠯᠬ᠎ᠠ ᠠᠶᠠᠯᠭᠤ [χaɬχ ai̯ɮɢʊ́]) is a dialect of central Mongolian widely spoken in Mongolia. According to some classifications, the Khalkha dialect includes Inner Mongolian varieties such as Shiliin gol, Ulaanchab and Sönid. As it was the basis for the Cyrillic orthography of Mongolian, it is de facto the national language of Mongolia. The name of the dialect is related to the name of the Khalkha Mongols and the Khalkha River.

There are certain differences between normative (standardised form of Khalkha) and spoken Khalkha. For example, the normative language uses proximal demonstratives based on the word stem ʉː/n- (except for the nominative in [i̠n] and the accusative which takes the stem ʉːn-) and thus exhibits the same developmental tendency as exhibited by Oirat. On the other hand, the spoken language also makes use of paradigms that are based on the stems inʉːn- and inĕn-. This seems to agree with the use in Chakhar Mongolian. The same holds for the distal demonstrative /tir/.

Khalkha may roughly be divided into Northern and Southern Khalkha, which would include Sönid, etc. Both varieties share affricate depalatalization, namely, /tʃ/ > /ts/ and /tʃʰ/ > /tsʰ/ except before *i, while Southern Khalkha patterns with Chakhar and Ordos Mongolian in that it exhibits a dissimilating deaspiration; e.g. *tʰatʰa > /tatʰ/. However, Mongolian scholars more often hold that the border between Khalkha and Chakhar is the border between the Mongolian state and the Chakhar area of Inner Mongolia of China.

Especially in the speech of younger speakers, /p/ (or /w/) > [ɸ] may take place, as in written Mongolian qabtasu > Sünid [ɢaptʰǎs] ~ [ɢaɸtʰǎs] 'cover (of a book)'.

One of the classifications of Khalkha dialect in Mongolia divides it into 3 subdialects: Central, Western and Eastern. The orthography of the Mongolian Cyrillic alphabet is essentially based on the Central Khalkha dialect. Among the main differences is the pronunciation of initial letter х in feminine words which is in Central Khalkha pronounced as it is written, in Western Khalkha as h, and in Eastern Khalkha as g; e.g. хөтөл khötöl (Central Khalkha), көтөл kötöl (Western Khalkha), гөтөл götöl (Eastern Khalkha). The initial letter х is pronounced in masculine words in Western Khalkha as /h/ (almost not heard) if the following consonant is voiceless, and is pronounced as /ɢ/ (and devoiced to /q/) in Eastern Khalkha; e.g. хутга khutga [χó̙tʰɵ̙q] (Central Khalkha), hутага khutaga [hʊ́tʰəɣ] (Western Khalkha), гутага gutaga [ɢʊ́tʰəq] (Eastern Khalkha). Initial /tʰ/ is unaspirated in Eastern Khalkha; e.g. талх talkh [tʰaɬχ] (Central Khalkha), талқ talq [tʰaɬq] (Western Khalkha), далх dalkh [taɬχ] (Eastern Khalkha).

== Grouping of Khalkha dialects ==
In Juha Janhunen's book Mongolian, he groups the Khalkha dialects into the following 19:

- Mongolia:
  - Central
    - Khalkha Proper dialect
      - Northern Khalkha
      - Southern Khalkha
      - Ulaanbaatar dialect of Khalkha
  - Northern:
    - Khotogoid dialect
    - Darkhad dialect
  - Southeastern:
    - Dariganga dialect
- Russia:
  - Tsongol (ru)
  - Sartuul
    - officially, both are classified as "Buryat" dialects.
- Inner Mongolia:
  - Ulaanchab dialects:
    - Chakhar dialect
    - Urad dialect
    - Darkhan dialect
    - Dörbhön Khuukhed dialect
    - Muumingan dialect
    - Khishigten dialect
- Shilingol dialects:
  - Udzumuchin dialect
  - Khuuchit dialect
  - Abaga dialect
  - Abaganar dialect
  - Sunud dialect

== Bibliography ==
- Amaržargal, B. (1988): BNMAU dah’ mongol helnij nutgijn ajalguuny tol’ bichig: halh ajalguu. Ulaanbaatar: ŠUA.
- Birtalan, Ágnes (2003): Oirat. In: Janhunen (ed.) 2003: 210-228.
- Bläsing, Uwe (2003): Kalmuck. In: Janhunen (ed.) 2003: 229-247.
- Janhunen, Juha (ed.) (2003): The Mongolic languages. London: Routledge.
- Janhunen, Juha (2003a): Mongol dialects. In: Janhunen 2003: 177-191.
- Ölǰeyibürin (2001): Sünid aman ayalγun-u geyigülügči abiyalaburi-yin sistem. In: Mongγol Kele Utq-a ǰokiyal 2001/1: 16-23.
- Poppe, Nicholas (1951): Khalkha-mongolische Grammatik. Wiesbaden: Franz Steiner.
- Sečenbaγatur, Qasgerel, Tuyaγ-a, B. ǰirannige, U Ying ǰe (2005): Mongγul kelen-ü nutuγ-un ayalγun-u sinǰilel-ün uduridqal. Kökeqota: Öbür mongγul-un arad-un keblel-ün qoriy-a.
- Street, John (1957): The language of the Secret history of the Mongols. American Oriental series 42.
- Svantesson, Jan-Olof, Anna Tsendina, Anastasia Karlsson, Vivan Franzén (2005): The Phonology of Mongolian. New York: Oxford University Press.
