= Ordos Mongolian =

Central Mongolic language

Ordos
- Native to: China
- Region: Ordos, Inner Mongolia
- Ethnicity: Ordos Mongols
- Native speakers: (120,000 cited 1982 census)
- Language family: Mongolic: Central Mongolic; Buryat–Mongolian; Mongolian; Peripheral Mongolian; Ordos

Language codes
- ISO 639-3: –
- Glottolog: ordo1245
- ELP: Ordos
- Ordos is classified as Definitely Endangered by the UNESCO Atlas of the World's Languages in Danger.

Ordos Mongolian (also Urdus; Mongolian ᠣᠷᠳᠣᠰ; Chinese: 鄂尔多斯 鄂尔多斯 È'ěrduōsī) is a variety of Central Mongolic spoken in the Ordos region in Inner Mongolia and historically by Ordos Mongols. It is alternatively classified as a language within the Mongolic language family or as a dialect of the standard Mongolian language. Due to the research of Antoine Mostaert, the development of this dialect can be traced back 100 years.

The Ordos vowel-phoneme system in word-initial syllables is similar to that of Chakhar Mongolian, the most notable difference being that it has [e] and [e:] instead of [ə] and [ə:]. In southern varieties, *ɔ merged into /ʊ/, e.g. while you still say ɔrtɔs in Ejin Horo Banner, it has become ʊrtʊs in Uxin or the Otog Front Banner. In contrast to the other dialects of Mongolian proper, it retains this distinction in all following syllables including in open word-final syllables, thus resembling the syllable and phoneme structure of Middle Mongolian more than any other Mongolian variety. E.g. MM /ɑmɑ/ Ordos /ɑmɑ/ Khalkha /ɑm/ 'mouth', Ordos /ɑxʊr/ Khalkha /ɑxr/ ([ɑxɑ̯r]) 'short; short sheep's wool'. Accordingly, it could never acquire palatalized consonant phonemes. Due to their persistent existence as short non-initial phonemes, /u/ and /ʊ/ have regressively assimilated *ø and *o, e.g. *otu > /ʊtʊ/ 'star', *ɡomutal > /ɡʊmʊdal/ 'offence', *tʰøry > /tʰuru/ 'power'. An analogous change took place for some sequences of *a and *u, e.g. *arasu > /arʊsʊ/.

Ordos retains a variant of the old comitative case and shares the innovated directive case. The verb system is not well researched, but employs a notable innovated suffix, ⟨guːn⟩, that does not seem to adhere to the common division into three Mongolic verb suffix classes.

The lexicon of Ordos is that of a normal Mongolian dialect, with some Tibetan and Chinese loanwords.

== Bibliography ==
- Mostaert, Antoine (1937): Textes oraux ordos. Peiping: The Catholic University.
- Mostaert, Antoine (1941–1944): Dictionnaire ordos, vols. 1-3. Peiping: The Catholic University.
- Sečen, Č. (2003): Ordus aman ayalɣun-daki öbürmiče uruɣul-un ǰokičal buyu iǰilsil [ʊ] + [ʊ], [ʉ] + [ʉ]-yin tuqai. In: Mongγul kele udq-a ǰokiyal 2003/5: 33–36.
- Sečen, Č., M. Baγatur, Sengge (2002): Ordus aman ayalγun-u sudulul. Kökeqota: Öbür mongγul-un arad-un keblel-ün qoriy-a.
- Sečenbaγatur, Qasgerel, Tuyaγ-a, B. ǰirannige, U Ying ǰe (2005): Mongγul kelen-ü nutuγ-un ayalγun-u sinǰilel-ün uduridqal. Kökeqota: Öbür mongγul-un arad-un keblel-ün qoriy-a. ISBN 7-204-07621-4.
- Sonum (2008): Ordus aman ayalγun-u üges-ün quriyangγui. Nemen ǰasaγsan debter. Beijing: Ündüsüten-ü keblel-ün qoriy-a.
- Soyultu, I. (1982):Ordus-un aman ayalγun-u ɢɷːn ɡuːn-u daγaburi. Öbür mongγul-un yeke surγaγuli 1982/2: 29–43.
- Georg, Stefan: Ordos. In: J. Janhunen (ed.): The Mongolic Languages. London: Routledge. ISBN 0-7007-1133-3, pp. 193–209.
