= G10 Suifenhe–Manzhouli Expressway =

Expressway in China

Suifenhe–Manzhouli Expressway
- 绥芬河－满洲里高速公路
- Suiman Expressway 绥满高速公路

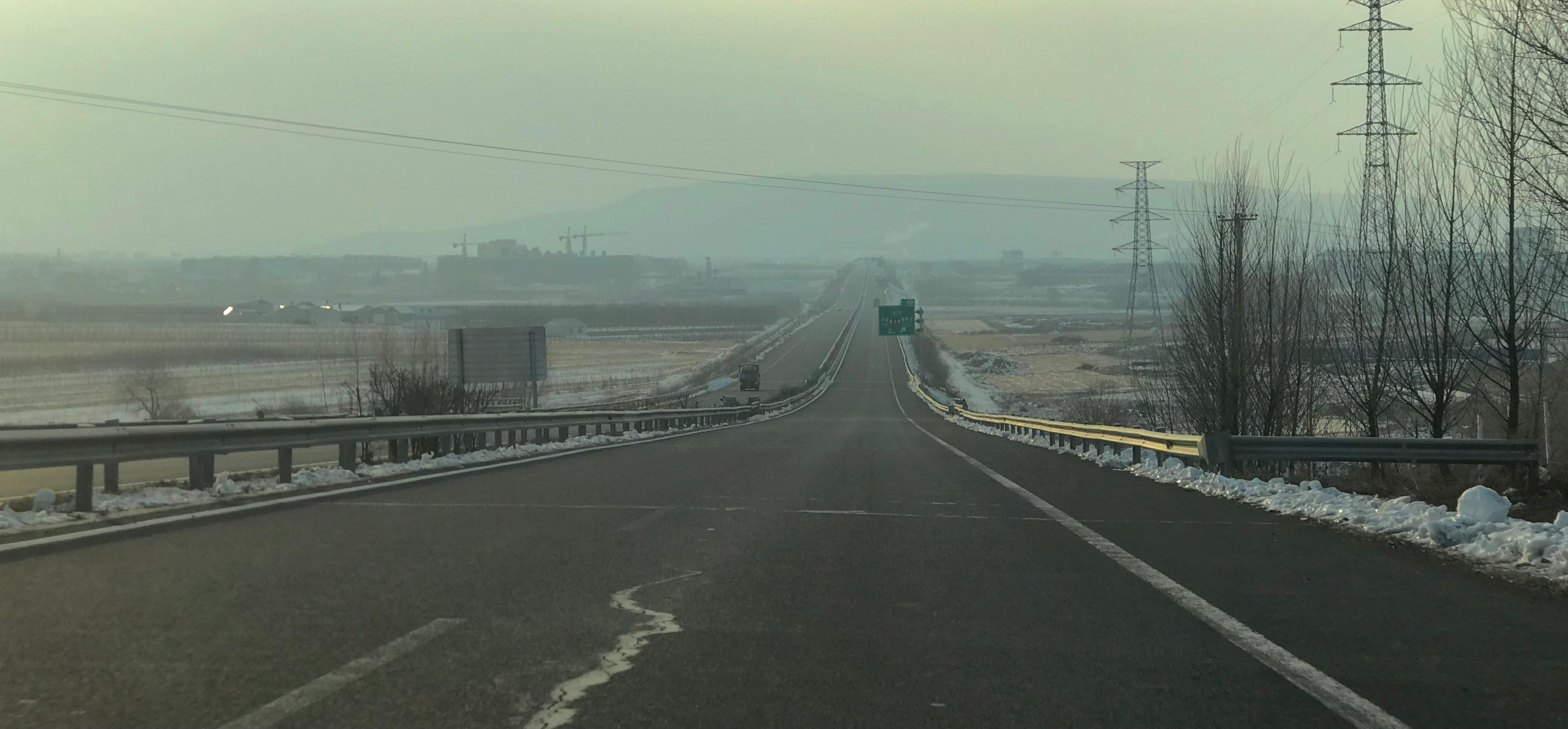
- Suiman Expressway in Mudanjiang

Route information
- Part of AH6
- Length: 1,520 km (940 mi) Length when complete.

Major junctions
- East end: G301 / Heilongjiang S206 in Suifenhe, Mudanjiang, Heilongjiang
- G11 in Mudanjiang, Heilongjiang; G1001 in Xiangfang District, Harbin, Heilongjiang; G1 in Harbin, Heilongjiang; G1001 in Songbei District, Harbin, Heilongjiang; G45 in Daqing, Heilongjiang; Heilongjiang S19 in Qiqihar, Heilongjiang
- West end: Manzhouli, Inner Mongolia (when complete); G301 in Gannan County, Qiqihar, Heilongjiang (current)

Location
- Country: China

Highway system
- National Trunk Highway System; Primary; Auxiliary; National Highways; Transport in China
← G0712	→ G1001

The Suifenhe–Manzhouli Expressway (Chinese: 绥芬河－满洲里高速公路), designated as G10 and commonly referred to as the Suiman Expressway (Chinese: 绥满高速公路), is an expressway that connects the cities of Suifenhe, Heilongjiang, China, and Manzhouli, Inner Mongolia. When fully complete, it will be 1,520 km (940 mi) in length. Currently, the expressway is complete in its entirety in Heilongjiang Province, from Suifenhe to just northwest of Qiqihar. The section in Inner Mongolia, from Arun Banner to Manzhouli, is in the planning stage and not yet built.

Both ends of the expressway terminate at border towns with Russia. Suifenhe is the location of a border crossing with Russian locality of Pogranichny in Primorsky Krai. Manzhouli is across the border from Zabaykalsk in Zabaykalsky Krai. The expressway parallels much of China National Highway 301, a highway that connects Suifenhe and Manzhouli, and the Chinese Eastern Railway between the two cities.

The entirety of the expressway is part of Asian Highway 6.

== Detailed Itinerary ==
From East to West
Continues as AH6 G301 Road; Suifenhe; Towards (Russia) AH6 A184 Highway
	G301 Road; S206 Road
Toll Station
	G301 Road; S206 Road; Suiyang
	S206 Road; Maqiaohe
	X068 Road; Xingyuan
	G301 Road; Muling Town
	G301 Road; Modaoshi
Mudanjiang Urban Area
Modaoshi Service Area
146 (435)	G11 Heda Expressway
Concurrent with G11 Heda Expressway
161 A-B (450)	G11 Heda Expressway; Bamiantong St; Towards G201 Road; Mudanjiang-Centre
Xiaomo Service Area
170	W Diming St; Mudanjiang-Centre
Mudanjiang Urban Area
179	Haiyan Ave; Hailin
213	G301 Road; Hengdaohe
259	Yuchi
269	S223 Road; Yabuli Towards Yabuli Ski Resort
289	X156 Road; Weihe
321	X153 Road; Yimianpo
337	G301 Road; S203 Road; Shangzhi
348	Wujimi
384	G301 Road; Mao'ershan
Pingshan Service Area
393	Towards G301 Road; Pingshan
400	G301 Road; Xiaoling
414	G301 Road; Yuquan
	Harbin Northern Forest Zoo
431	G301 Road; Yagou
437	X005 Road; Acheng
441	Jiefang Avenue; Acheng
Acheng Service Area
Harbin Metropolitan Area
459 (0)	G1001 Harbin Ring Expressway; Towards G301 Road; Harbin-Centre
Concurrent with G1001 Harbin Ring Expressway
Service Area
(6)	G202 Road; Harbin-Centre-Pingfang
(10 A-B)	AH31 G1 Jingha Expressway; G102 Road Tongjiang Road Station
(24)	S1 Harbin Airport Expressway; Harbin Taiping International Airport; Harbin-Centre
Yangmingtan Bridge
(36)	Shimao Road; Harbin-North Sun Island Park
Songbei Service Area
Concurrent with G1001 Harbin Ring Expressway
502 (42)	AH31 G1001 Harbin Ring Expressway; G202 Road; G301 Road; Harbin-North
	Duiqingshan
Harbin Metropolitan Area
Zhaodong Service Area
551	G301 Road; S305 Road; Zhaodong
588	G301 Road; Chengping-Anmin
610	G203 Road; Anda
Daqing Toll Station
Daqing Metropolitan Area
	G301 Road; Wolitun
Concurrent with G301 Road
	G301 Road; Daqing-Centre
Qingdong Toll Station
Honghu Service Area
644	Xuewei Street; Daqing-Centre
	G45 Daguang Expressway; Daqing Sartu Airport
Daqing Metropolitan Area
	G301 Road; Towards Daqing-West
	G301 Road; Huayuan
Huayuan Toll Station
	G301 Road; Towards S201 Road; Lindian
	Fanrong
Qiqihar Urban Area
(236 A-B)	S19 Nentai Expressway; Towards G301 Road; Qiqihar-Centre
Concurrent with S19 Nentai Expressway
775	S19 Nentai Expressway; S302 Road
Concurrent with S302 Road
779	Suiman Road; Qiqihar-Centre
	G301 Road; Bukui N Street; Qiqihar-Centre
Qiqihar Urban Area
Concurrent with S302 Road
792	G301 Road; S302 Road; Towards Meilisi-Fularji
	Gonghe
	G301 Road; Changshan
	G301 Road; Gannan
Gannan Service Area
Heilongjiang Province; Inner Mongolia Autonomous Region
Toll Station
	G111 Road; G301 Road; Arun-South
897	G111 Road; G301 Road; Arun-North
Houxinli Service Area
	G301 Road; Hou'erqi
	G301 Road; Chabaqi
Yahagou Service Area
	G301 Road
	G301 Road; Boketu
Zhadunhe Service Area
	G301 Road; Mianduhe
Yakeshi Service Area
	G301 Road; Yakeshi-South
1169	G301 Road; Yakeshi-West
Hulunbuir Urban Area
1207	G301 Road; Zhaluomude
Hake Service Area
Toll Station
1240	G301 Road; Hake
	S40 Hailar Airport Expressway; Hulunbuir Hailar Airport; Hulunbuir-Centre
	G301 Road; Hulunbuir-North
Haidong Service Area
Toll Station
Hulunbuir Urban Area
	G301 Road; S201 Road
Continues as AH6 G301 Road; Towards Manzhouli; Towards (Russia) AH6 A350 Highway
Under Construction
From West to East
