= Penglin Wang =

- Born
- Occupations: Linguist, linguistic and cultural anthropologist, academic and author

Academic background
- Education: Diploma in Russian; M.A. in Ethnology; Ph.D. in Linguistics
- Alma mater: Beijing Foreign Studies University; The Chinese Academy of Social Sciences; University of Hawaiʻi at Mānoa
- Thesis: Description of Dagur verb morphology (1993)

Academic work
- Institutions: Central Washington University (CWU)

Penglin Wang (王鵬林) is a linguist, linguistic and cultural anthropologist, academic, and author. He is a professor in the Department of Anthropology & Museum Studies at Central Washington University (CWU).

Wang is most known for his work in linguistic anthropology, linguistics, cognitive anthropology, cultural anthropology, and Asian studies, with a focus on Central Eurasia and China. He has contributed to academic papers and conference presentations in his field and is the author of two books: Number Conception and Application and Linguistic Mysteries of Ethnonyms in Inner Asia.

== Education and early career ==
Wang, an ethnic Dagur from the Dagur Autonomous Banner in eastern Inner Mongolia, was raised speaking Dagur and educated in Chinese in western Heilongjiang. He earned a Diploma (equivalent to a B.A.) in Russian from Beijing Foreign Studies University in 1977. He then obtained an M.A. in Ethnology from the Graduate School of the Chinese Academy of Social Sciences (CASS) in 1981. He was also a Degree Fellow at the East-West Center for four years and completed his Ph.D. in linguistics at the University of Hawaiʻi at Mānoa in 1993, with a thesis titled "Description of Dagur Verb Morphology."

== Career ==
Wang resumed his academic career as a part-time Chinese Instructor at the Far Eastern Institute of Advanced Studies in Honolulu from May to July 1994 and as a part-time Research Assistant at the University of Hawaii at Mānoa from August to December 1994. He served as a University Lecturer, later becoming an assistant professor at the Chinese University of Hong Kong from 1995 to 2001.

Wang conducted fieldwork across China, researching minority languages and cultures from 1980 to 2001, including Dagur, Zhuang, Yao, Miao, Dong, Mongolian, and Turkic, in regions such as Yunnan, Guizhou, Heilongjiang, Xinjiang, Inner Mongolia, and Guangxi. He organized and supervised expeditions, studying the linguistic and cultural practices of indigenous and minority groups in Inner Mongolia and Taiwan. Following this, he joined CWU, where he was an assistant professor from September 2001 to August 2004, an associate professor from September 2004 to August 2009, and has been a professor in the Department of Anthropology & Museum Studies since September 2009.

== Research ==
Wang's Number Conception and Application investigated the origins and linguistic evolution of number words in Altaic, Indo-European, and Sino-Tibetan languages. Integrating anthropology and history, he analyzed numeral etymology and cognitive patterns, linking variability in counting systems to social need and complexity rather than primitiveness. His book Linguistic Mysteries of Ethnonyms in Inner Asia extended the inquiry into linguistic and cultural anthropology. In it, he traced the origins and meanings of ethnonyms such as Xianbei, Tuoba, and Mongol, highlighting Indo-European and Altaic influences and offering a transcontinental framework for their study. The analysis primarily relied on ancient Chinese texts for cross-linguistic and patterned insights.

In his early research, Wang shed light on the origin and disappearance of h- in Middle Mongolian and traced the etymology of the word "silk", suggesting its entry into Tokharian and European languages through Old Mongolian or Tungusic, rather than directly from Chinese. He also examined Altaic regnal titles, incorporating Tokharian elements, as reflections of sun-worship and shamanism, symbolizing rulers as protectors, and tracing their evolution through themes of celestial power, greatness, and wisdom. Additionally, he delved into lunar symbolism and its impact on naming of such scaly creatures as turtles and snakes, which served to help early people symbolize the northern direction. Moreover, his work on animal totemism and naming taboo included studies on onggon (the spirit inhabiting a material object) and the role of powerful animals as ancestral symbols, as well as the diffusion of naming taboos across languages, with references to ancient Chinese literature.

Wang further explored linguistic contact between Indo-European Tokharian and Altaic speakers, investigating the significant presence of Tokharian and other Indo-European linguistic elements in Altaic. In a shift of focus, he studied lexical parallels between Mongolic and Old English by formulating the correspondence between the Old English lateral l and the Mongolic nasal n, proposing that early interactions could suggest influence from Old English on Altaic despite traditional linguistic views.

Wang tracked the evolution of the numeral "eight" in Mongolic and Tungusic languages, linking it to astrological symbolism, numerical reinterpretation, and ethnic designation, and argued that the diversity of numeral systems in Altaic languages likely resulted from linguistic contact rather than cognitive incompatibility. His work also highlighted the relationship between shamanistic terminology and numerology in Altaic cultures, showing how spiritual and numerological meanings diffused across Eurasia. In a conference presentation from 2024, he revisited the Xiongnu phrase ninghu yanshi, updated its meaning as 'the sixth consort' and connected the word ninghu 'six' with Jurchen ninggu 'six', strengthening the linguistic affiliation of Xiongnu in the Altaic family.

== Bibliography ==
=== Books ===
- Number Conception and Application (2014) ISBN 9781633217270
- Linguistic Mysteries of Ethnonyms in Inner Asia (2018) ISBN 9781498535274

=== Selected articles ===
- Wang, P. (1992). On the Origin of the Middle Mongolian Initial h- and the Motivation for Its Loss. Archív Orientální, 60, 389-408.
- Wang, P. (1993). On the etymology of English silk: A case study of IE and Altaic contact. Central Asiatic Journal, 37(3/4), 225-248.
- Wang, P. (1995). Tokharian words in Altaic regnal titles. Central Asiatic Journal, 39(2), 165-207.
- Wang, P. (2007). Octonary conception in Central Eurasia: its ethnonymic connection and numerical reinterpretation. Central Asiatic Journal, 51(2), 247-272.
- Wang, P. (2011). The Power of Numbers in Shamanism A Patterned Explanation of Shaman Names in Inner Asia. Central Asiatic Journal, 55(1), 91-127.
- Wang, P. (2013). Animal Totemism and Naming Taboo. Mankind Quarterly, 54(2), 201–228.
- Wang, P. (2024, October 31–November 2). The Xiongnu Phrase Ninghu Yanshi Means ‘the Sixth Consort’. American Oriental Society Western Branch Annual Meeting. Arizona State University, Tempe, Arizona, USA.
