= G1001 Harbin Ring Expressway =

Expressway in Harbin of Heilongjiang Province, China

Harbin Ring Expressway
- 哈尔滨绕城高速公路

Route information
- Length: 91.2 km (56.7 mi)

Major junctions
- Orbital around Harbin

Location
- Country: China

Highway system
- National Trunk Highway System; Primary; Auxiliary; National Highways; Transport in China
← G10	→ G1011

The Harbin Ring Expressway (Chinese: 哈尔滨绕城高速), designated as G1001, is an expressway in Heilongjiang, Northeast China orbiting the city of Harbin. This expressway is a branch of G10 Suifenhe–Manzhouli Expressway.

== Detailed Itinerary ==
Counterclockwise
Continues as G1001 Harbin Ring Expressway
0 (459)	AH6 G10 Suiman Expressway; Towards G301 Road; Harbin-Centre
Concurrent with AH6 G10 Suiman Expressway
Service Area
6	G202 Road; Harbin-Centre-Pingfang
10 A-B	AH31 G1 Jingha Expressway; G102 Road Tongjiang Road Station
24	S1 Harbin Airport Expressway; Harbin Taiping International Airport; Harbin-Centre
Yangmingtan Bridge
36	Shimao Road; Harbin-North Sun Island Park
Songbei Service Area
Concurrent with AH6 G10 Suiman Expressway
42 (502)	AH6 G10 Suiman Expressway; G202 Road; G301 Road; Harbin-North
Harbin Metropolitan Area
45	AH31 G1111 Heha Expressway
Harbin Metropolitan Area
Hulan Service Area
51	G222 Road; Hulan
64	X032 Road; Minzhu
71 A-B (0 A-B)	AH33 G1011 Hatong Expressway; G221 Road; Xianfeng Ave; Harbin-Centre
75	Ha'a Road; Acheng; Harbin-Xiangfang District
80	Hacheng Road; Chenggaozi; Harbin-Centre
(0) (459)	AH6 G10 Suiman Expressway; Towards G301 Road; Harbin-Centre
Continues as G1001 Harbin Ring Expressway; Continues as AH6 G10 Suiman Expressway
Clockwise
