= Morin Dawa Daur Autonomous Banner =

Morin Dawa Banner 莫力达瓦旗 • Morin dawaa guasei ᠮᠣᠷᠢᠨ ᠳᠠᠪᠠᠭ᠎ᠠ ᠬᠣᠰᠢᠭᠤ
- Autonomous banner
- Morin Dawa Daur Autonomous Banner 莫力达瓦达斡尔族自治旗 Морин Даваа Даор Веерие Ихькиеву Гуасей ᠮᠣᠷᠢᠨ ᠳᠠᠪᠠᠭ᠎ᠠ ᠳᠠᠭᠤᠷ ᠥᠪᠡᠷᠲᠡᠭᠡᠨ ᠵᠠᠰᠠᠬᠤ ᠬᠣᠰᠢᠭᠤ; Morin dawaa Daor weerie ixkiewu guasei
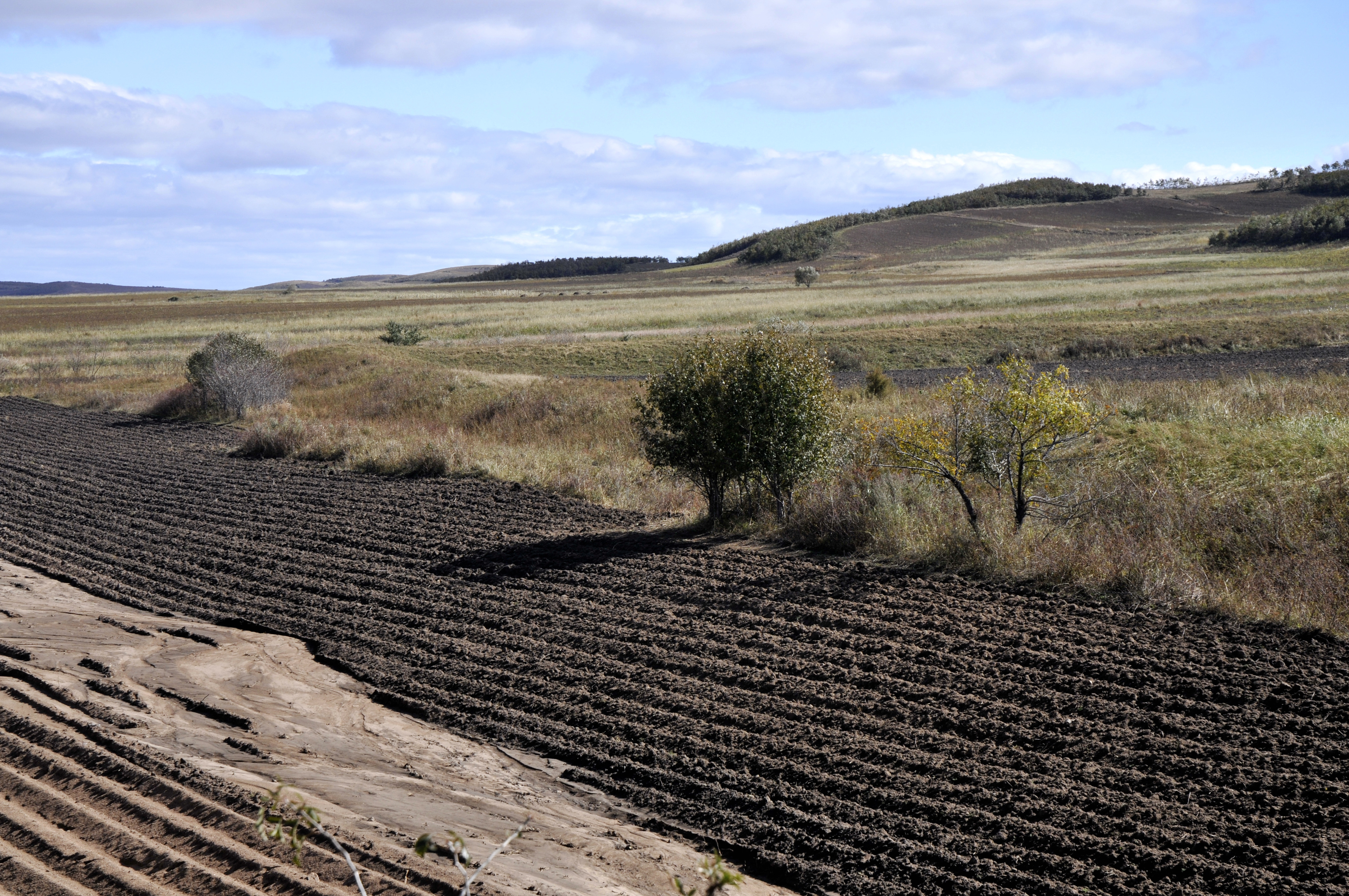
- Ruins of Jin dynasty Great Wall in Morin Dawa

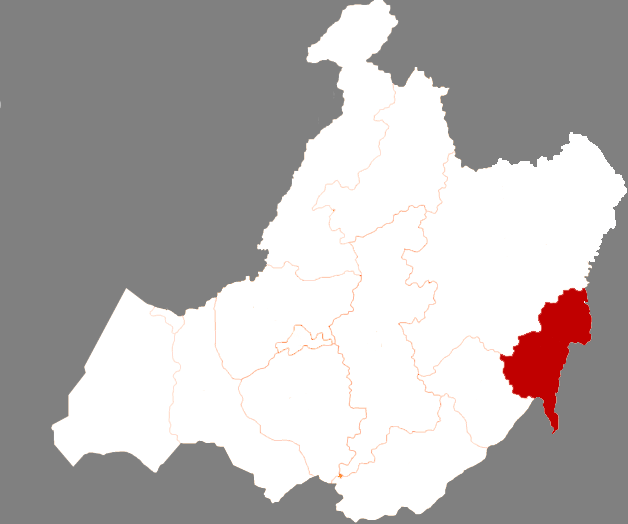
- Location in Hulunbuir

- Location in Inner Mongolia Morin Dawa (China)
- Coordinates: 48°28′N 124°30′E
- Country: China
- Autonomous region: Inner Mongolia
- Prefecture-level city: Hulunbuir
- Banner seat: Nirgi

Area
  - Total: 10,400 km^{2} (4,000 sq mi)
- Elevation: 228 m (748 ft)

Population (2020)
  - Total: 228,822
  - Density: 22.0/km^{2} (57.0/sq mi)
- Time zone: UTC+8 (China Standard)
- Website: www.mldw.gov.cn

Morin Dawa Daur Autonomous Banner

Chinese name
- Simplified Chinese: 莫力达瓦达斡尔族自治旗
- Traditional Chinese: 莫力達瓦達斡爾族自治旗
Transcriptions
Standard Mandarin
- Hanyu Pinyin: Mòlì Dáwǎ Dáwò'ěrzú Zìzhìqí

Mongolian name
- Mongolian Cyrillic: Мориндаваа Дагуур өөртөө засах хошуу
- Mongolian script: ᠮᠣᠷᠢᠨ ᠳᠠᠪᠠᠭ᠎ᠠ ᠳᠠᠭᠤᠷ ᠥᠪᠡᠷᠲᠡᠭᠡᠨ ᠵᠠᠰᠠᠬᠤ ᠬᠣᠰᠢᠭᠤ
Transcriptions
- SASM/GNC: Morin Dabaɣ-a Daɣur öbertegen jasaqu qosiɣu

Daur name
- Daur: Морин Даваа Даор Ихькиеву Гуасей ᠮᠣᡵᢈᠨ ᡩᠠᠸᠠᡝ ᡩᠠᡠᠷ ᠸᡝᡝᡵᢈᡝ ᢈᡧᡴᢈᡝᠸᡠ ᡤᡠᠠᠰᡝᢈ; Morin Dawaa Daor weerie ixkiewu guasei

Morin Dawa Daur Autonomous Banner (Mongolian: ᠮᠣᠷᠢᠨ ᠳᠠᠪᠠᠭ᠎ᠠ ᠳᠠᠭᠤᠷ ᠥᠪᠡᠷᠲᠡᠭᠡᠨ ᠵᠠᠰᠠᠬᠤ ᠬᠣᠰᠢᠭᠤ; Dagur: Морин Даваа Даор Ихькиеву Гуасей, ᠮᠣᡵᢈᠨ ᡩᠠᠸᠠᡝ ᡩᠠᡠᠷ ᠸᡝᡝᡵᢈᡝ ᢈᡧᡴᢈᡝᠸᡠ ᡤᡠᠠᠰᡝᢈ; Chinese: 莫力达瓦达斡尔族自治旗), often abbreviated in official documents as Mo Banner (Chinese: 莫旗; pinyin: Mò Qí), is one of three autonomous banners in Inner Mongolia, China, created for the Daur people. It lies on the Nen River, borders Heilongjiang province to the east, south and southwest (Nehe, Nenjiang, and Gannan County) and is under the administration of Hulunbuir City. The autonomous banner spans an area of approximately 10,400 square kilometres (4,000 mi^{2}), and has a total population of 316,398 as of 2019.

== History ==
During the Qing dynasty, a yamen was organized in the area, which was organized as Buteha (simplified Chinese: 布特哈副都统; traditional Chinese: 布特哈副都統; pinyin: Bùtèhā fù dū tǒng).

In 1946, the region was organized Buteha West Banner (Chinese: 布西旗; pinyin: Bùxī Qí).

Morin Dawa Daur Autonomous Banner was created on August 15, 1958.

On April 1, 1969, the autonomous banner was placed under the jurisdiction of Daxing'anling Prefecture, before being moved back to Inner Mongolia's jurisdiction on July 1, 1979.

== Geography ==
The autonomous banner is located in the northeast of Inner Mongolia, along the west banks of the Nen River, at the confluence of the Greater Khingan Mountains and the Songnen Plains. The autonomous banner has an average elevation of approximately 400 metres (1,300 ft) above sea level, with the autonomous banner's highest point of Waxigeqi Mountain (Chinese: 瓦西格奇山; pinyin: Wǎxīgéqí Shān), in Dular Evenk Ethnic Township, reaching 638.3 metres (2,094 ft) above sea level. 56 different rives flow through Morin Dawa Daur Autonomous Banner.

Morin Dawa Daur Autonomous Banner is bordered by Nehe and Nenjiang in Heilongjiang province to the east, borders Gannan County in Heilongjiang province to the southwest, and borders Oroqen Autonomous Banner and Arun Banner to the north and northwest.

=== Fauna ===
A number of nationally protected species are found in the banner, including the Asian black bear, the sable, and reindeer.

=== Climate ===
The autonomous banner experiences an average annual temperature of 1.3 °C (34.3 °F), annual precipitation typically ranging between 400 millimetres (16 in) and 500 millimetres (20 in), and an average of 115 frost-free days annually.

Climate data for Morin Dawa Daur Autonomous Banner, elevation 198 m (650 ft), (1991–2020 normals, extremes 1981–2010)
Month	Jan	Feb	Mar	Apr	May	Jun	Jul	Aug	Sep	Oct	Nov	Dec	Year
Record high °C (°F)	−2.0 (28.4)	8.9 (48.0)	20.1 (68.2)	28.8 (83.8)	38.8 (101.8)	40.1 (104.2)	37.7 (99.9)	35.0 (95.0)	33.4 (92.1)	26.5 (79.7)	14.1 (57.4)	3.0 (37.4)	40.1 (104.2)
Mean daily maximum °C (°F)	−14.2 (6.4)	−8.3 (17.1)	1.3 (34.3)	12.5 (54.5)	20.8 (69.4)	26.2 (79.2)	27.8 (82.0)	25.6 (78.1)	20.1 (68.2)	10.6 (51.1)	−2.7 (27.1)	−12.9 (8.8)	8.9 (48.0)
Daily mean °C (°F)	−20.1 (−4.2)	−15.1 (4.8)	−5.3 (22.5)	5.7 (42.3)	14.1 (57.4)	20.3 (68.5)	22.6 (72.7)	20.3 (68.5)	13.7 (56.7)	4.4 (39.9)	−8.3 (17.1)	−18.2 (−0.8)	2.8 (37.1)
Mean daily minimum °C (°F)	−25.1 (−13.2)	−21.2 (−6.2)	−11.7 (10.9)	−1.1 (30.0)	7.2 (45.0)	14.3 (57.7)	17.7 (63.9)	15.2 (59.4)	7.7 (45.9)	−1.3 (29.7)	−13.2 (8.2)	−23.0 (−9.4)	−2.9 (26.8)
Record low °C (°F)	−38.9 (−38.0)	−38.3 (−36.9)	−30.9 (−23.6)	−13.2 (8.2)	−6.0 (21.2)	1.3 (34.3)	6.2 (43.2)	3.5 (38.3)	−4.0 (24.8)	−16.3 (2.7)	−28.9 (−20.0)	−36.2 (−33.2)	−38.9 (−38.0)
Average precipitation mm (inches)	2.7 (0.11)	3.0 (0.12)	7.6 (0.30)	20.3 (0.80)	41.0 (1.61)	92.7 (3.65)	135.8 (5.35)	116.6 (4.59)	55.5 (2.19)	21.0 (0.83)	6.2 (0.24)	5.4 (0.21)	507.8 (20)
Average precipitation days (≥ 0.1 mm)	4.3	2.9	4.2	5.1	8.9	12.5	14.0	12.2	9.3	5.6	4.2	6.0	89.2
Average snowy days	6.5	4.8	6.4	3.6	0.3	0	0	0	0.1	2.8	6.5	8.5	39.5
Average relative humidity (%)	67	62	53	46	49	63	74	77	67	58	62	68	62
Mean monthly sunshine hours	170.1	201.5	252.1	242.2	261.0	264.9	251.8	246.9	227.9	206.2	165.8	146.8	2,637.2
Percentage possible sunshine	62	69	68	59	55	55	52	56	61	63	61	57	60
Source: China Meteorological Administration

== Administrative divisions ==
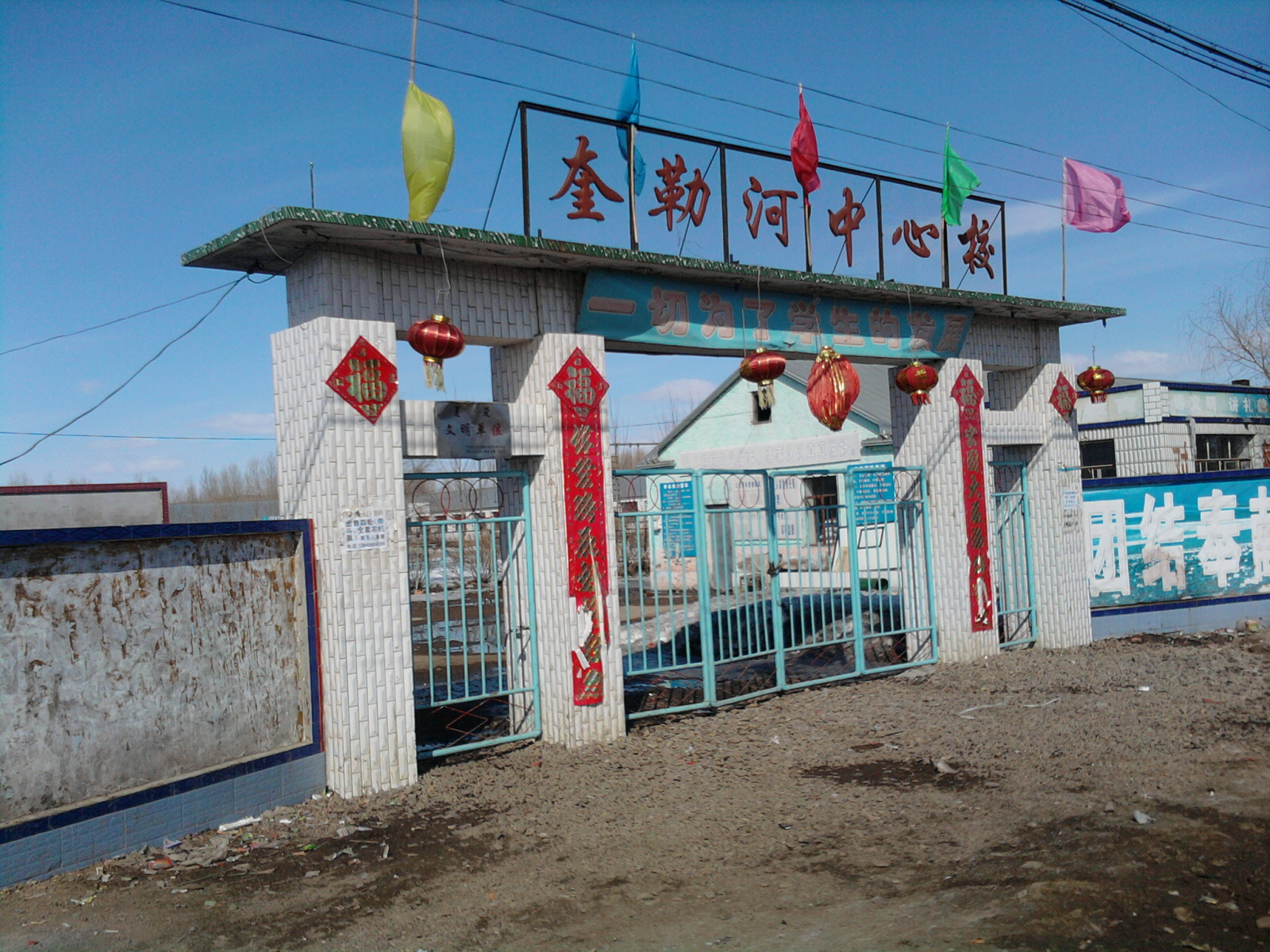
A building in the town of Kuileihe

Morin Dawa Daur Autonomous Banner administers 11 towns, 2 townships, and 2 ethnic townships.

Name	Simplified Chinese	Hanyu Pinyin	Mongolian (Hudum Script)	Mongolian (Cyrillic)	Daur	Administrative division code
Towns
Nirgi	尼尔基镇	Ní'ěrjī Zhèn	ᠨᠢᠷᠭᠢ ᠪᠠᠯᠭᠠᠰᠤ	Нярхий балгас	Nirgi giaabun	150722100
Baoshan	宝山镇	Bǎoshān Zhèn	ᠪᠣᠣ ᠱᠠᠨ ᠪᠠᠯᠭᠠᠰᠤ	Буу шин балгас	Baoshan giaabn	150722102
Hadayang	哈达阳镇	Hādáyáng Zhèn	ᠬᠠᠳᠠᠶᠠᠩ ᠪᠠᠯᠭᠠᠰᠤ	Хатаян балгас	Hadayan giaabn	150722103
Arla	阿尔拉镇	Ā'ěrlā Zhèn	ᠠᠷᠠᠯ ᠪᠠᠯᠭᠠᠰᠤ	Арал балгас	Arl giaabn	150722104
Hangur Gol	汉古尔河镇	Hàngǔ'ěrhé Zhèn	ᠬᠠᠩᠭᠤᠷ ᠭᠣᠣᠯ ᠪᠠᠯᠭᠠᠰᠤ	Хонгуур гол балгас	Hangurg giaabn	150722105
Xabart	西瓦尔图镇	Xīwǎ'ěrtú Zhèn	ᠰᠢᠪᠠᠷᠲᠤ ᠪᠠᠯᠭᠠᠰᠤ	Шаварт балгас	Shaort giaabn	150722106
Tengke	腾克镇	Téngkè Zhèn	ᠲᠧᠩᠺᠧ ᠪᠠᠯᠭᠠᠰᠤ	Тенке балгас	Tenke giaabn	150722108
Kuileihe	奎勒河镇	Kuílèhé Zhèn	ᠺᠦᠢ ᠯᠧ ᠾᠧ ᠪᠠᠯᠭᠠᠰᠤ	Күй ле ге балгас	Kuil huarg giaabn	150722109
Taban Obo	塔温敖宝镇	Tǎwēn'áobǎo Zhèn	ᠲᠠᠪᠤᠨ ᠣᠪᠣᠭ᠎ᠠ ᠪᠠᠯᠭᠠᠰᠤ	Таван овоо балгас	Taawn obo giaabn	150722110
Dengteke	登特科镇	Dēngtèkē Zhèn	ᠳ᠋ᠧᠩ ᠲᠧ ᠺᠧ ᠪᠠᠯᠭᠠᠰᠤ	Дэн те ке балгас	Dentke giaabn	150722111
Hongyan	红彦镇	Hóngyàn Zhèn	ᠬᠤᠩ ᠶᠠᠨ ᠪᠠᠯᠭᠠᠰᠤ	Хон яан балгас	Hungyan giaabn	150722112
Townships
Horx Township	库如奇乡	Kùrúqí Xiāng	ᠬᠥᠷᠰᠢ ᠰᠢᠶᠠᠩ	Хөрш шиян	Kurulqkn tors	150722201
Erh Township	额尔和乡	É'ěrhé Xiāng	ᠡᠷᠬᠡ ᠰᠢᠶᠠᠩ	Эрх шиян	Erg tors	150722202
Ethnic townships
Dular Evenk Ethnic Township	杜拉尔鄂温克民族乡	Dùlā'ěr Èwēnkè Mínzúxiāng	ᠳᠦᠷᠡᠯ ᠡᠸᠡᠩᠬᠢ ᠦᠨᠳᠦᠰᠦᠲᠡᠨ ᠦ ᠰᠢᠶᠠᠩ	Дүрэл эвэнк үндэстэний шиян	Dular Honkor aimn tors	150722203
Bayan Evenk Ethnic Township	巴彦鄂温克民族乡	Bāyàn Èwēnkè Mínzúxiāng	ᠪᠠᠶᠠᠨ ᠡᠸᠡᠩᠬᠢ ᠦᠨᠳᠦᠰᠦᠲᠡᠨ ᠦ ᠰᠢᠶᠠᠩ	Баян эвэнк үндэстэний шиян	Bayn Honkor aimn tors	150722205

== Demographics ==
As of 2019, Morin Dawa Daur Autonomous Banner has a population of 316,398, a 1.0% decrease from 2018, the 32nd most populous of Inner Mongolia's 103 county-level divisions. This is a slight increase from 2004, when the autonomous banner had a population of 314,584.

=== Vital statistics ===
As of 2018, the autonomous banner had a crude birth rate of 8.0 per thousand, and a crude death rate of 4.9 per thousand, giving the autonomous banner a rate of natural increase of 3.1 per thousand.

=== Urbanization ===
As of 2018, Morin Dawa Daur Autonomous Banner has 86,905 residents living in urban areas, giving the autonomous banner an urbanization rate of 27.19%.

=== Ethnicity ===
According to 2018 statistics compiled by the autonomous banner's government, there are 33,395 ethnic Daurs in the autonomous banner (10.45% of the autonomous banner's population), 6,851 ethnic Evenks (2.14% of the total population), and 337 ethnic Oroqen (0.11% of the total population).

According to a 2004 publication by the National Ethnic Affairs Commission, 80.3% of the autonomous banner's population is ethnically Han Chinese, 9.5% are ethnically Daur, and the remaining 10.2% belong to other ethnic minorities.

== Economy ==
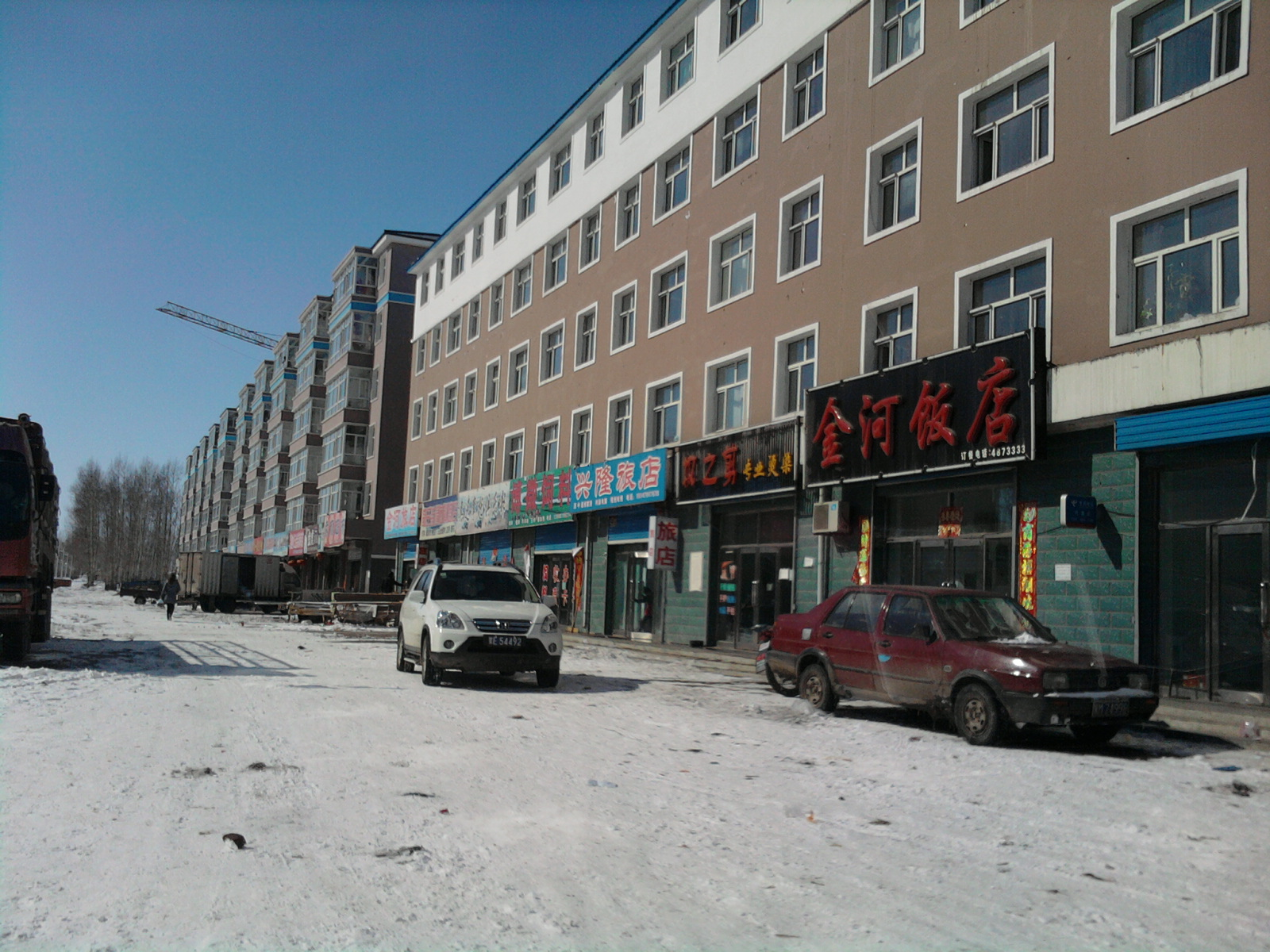
A winter street scene in the autonomous banner

Morin Dawa Daur Autonomous Banner has a gross domestic product of approximately 8,529,380,000 RMB as of 2019. Of this, 61.20% comes from the autonomous banner's primary sector, 5.90% comes from the secondary sector, and 32.91% comes from the tertiary sector.

As of 2019, the average annual disposable income for households in Morin Dawa Daur Autonomous Banner totals 15,825 RMB, a 7.9% increase from 2018. Average annual disposable income for urban households in Morin Dawa Daur Autonomous Banner totals 25,014 RMB, ranking last of all 101 county-level divisions in Inner Mongolia surveyed; the average annual disposable income for rural households totals 11,445 RMB, ranking 78th of the 90 county-level divisions in Inner Mongolia surveyed.

In 2018, consumer retail sales in the autonomous banner totaled 3,948,610,000 RMB, a 6.3% increase from 2017.

In 2019, the autonomous banner generated approximately 309.35 million RMB in public budget revenue, ranking 73rd out of the 103 county-level divisions in Inner Mongolia.

There are approximately 263,000 mobile phone subscriptions in the autonomous banner, reflecting approximately 83.12% of the autonomous banner's total population. There are approximately 49,000 internet subscriptions in the autonomous banner, reflecting approximately 15.49% of the total population. As of 2018, 99% of the population has television access, and 98% of the population has radio access.

=== Agriculture ===
Morin Dawa Daur Autonomous banner is the third biggest grain producing county-level division of Inner Mongolia, producing 1,737,448 tons of grain in 2019. The autonomous banner ranks 40th of 103 county-level divisions in meat output, producing 24,801 tons in 2019.

== Education ==
There are 26 primary schools and 9 secondary schools in Morin Dawa Daur Autonomous Banner.

== Culture ==
Morin Dawa Daur Autonomous Banner has been recognized by the National Ethnic Affairs Commission as a center for hockey in China, and teams fielded from the autonomous banner have gone on to compete at the top level in China. In a 2018 field hockey tournament for secondary school teams, teams from Morin Dawa Daur Autonomous Banner won a number of different formats, including fielding teams which won first and second place in the men's secondary school format, and a team which won third place in the men's under-15 format.

== Healthcare ==
The autonomous banner's medical institutions have 1,020 beds, and are staffed by 1,334 personnel.

== Transportation ==
2,298 kilometres (1,428 mi) of highways pass through the autonomous banner as of 2019.

== Tourism ==
In 2018, 975,000 tourists visited the autonomous banner, generating 910 million RMB in tourism revenue.

Morin Dawa Daur Autonomous Banner is home to tourist attractions of various types, including sites regarding the local Daur culture and the region's history, as well as natural landmarks.

The Chinese Daur Ethnic Park (simplified Chinese: 中国达斡尔民族园; traditional Chinese: 中國達斡爾民族園; pinyin: Zhōngguó Dáwò'ěr Mínzú Yuán) and the Daur Ethnic Museum (simplified Chinese: 达斡尔民族博物馆; traditional Chinese: 達斡爾民族博物館; pinyin: Dáwò'ěr Mínzú Bówùguǎn) are both located within the autonomous banner.

Portions of the Jin dynasty Great Wall run through the autonomous banner.
