= China National Highway 301 =

Road in China

National Highway 301
- 301国道

Route information
- Part of AH6
- Length: 1,680 km (1,040 mi)

Major junctions
- From: Suifenhe, Heilongjiang
- To: Manzhouli, Inner Mongolia

Location
- Country: China

Highway system
- National Trunk Highway System; Primary; Auxiliary
← G248	→ G302

China National Highway 301 (G301) runs from Suifenhe, Heilongjiang to Manzhouli, Inner Mongolia. It is 1,680 kilometres in length and runs northwest from Suifenhe towards Manzhouli.

== Route and distance ==
Route and distance

City	Distance (km)
Suifenhe City, Heilongjiang	0
Mudanjiang, Heilongjiang	183
Hailin, Heilongjiang	207
Shangzhi, Heilongjiang	370
Acheng District, Heilongjiang	491
Harbin, Heilongjiang	518
Zhaodong, Heilongjiang	595
Anda, Heilongjiang	678
Daqing, Heilongjiang	719
Ranghulu, Heilongjiang	734
Lindian, Heilongjiang	805
Qiqihar, Heilongjiang	902
Meilisi, Heilongjiang	927
Gannan County, Heilongjiang	998
Arun Banner, Inner Mongolia	1041
Yakeshi, Inner Mongolia	1380
Dayan, Inner Mongolia	1386
Hailar District, Inner Mongolia	1464
Old Barag Banner, Inner Mongolia	1485
Manzhouli, Inner Mongolia	1680

== See also ==
- China National Highways
- AH6
