= Suifenhe =

Suifenhe 绥芬河市
- County-level & Sub-prefectural city
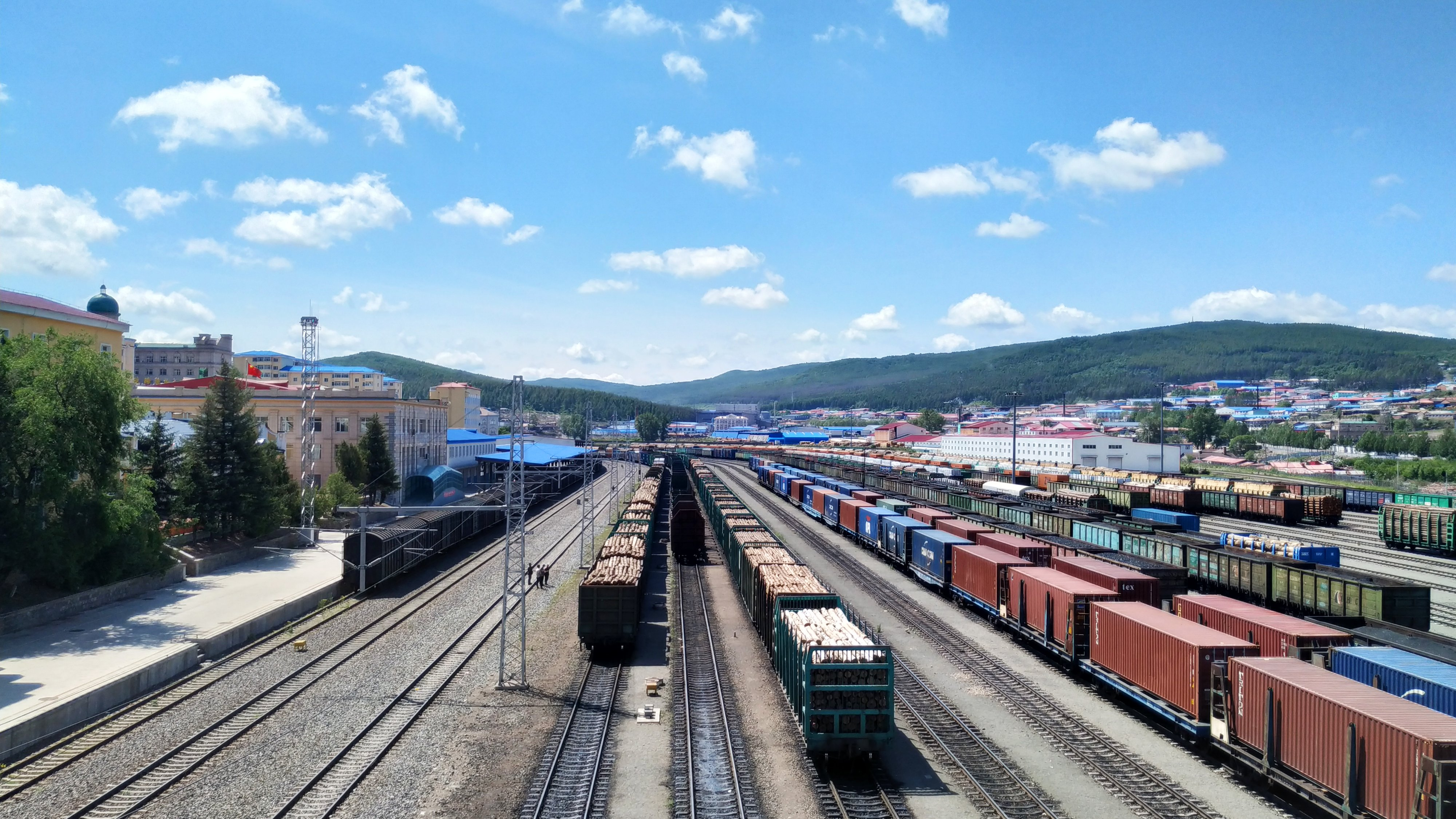
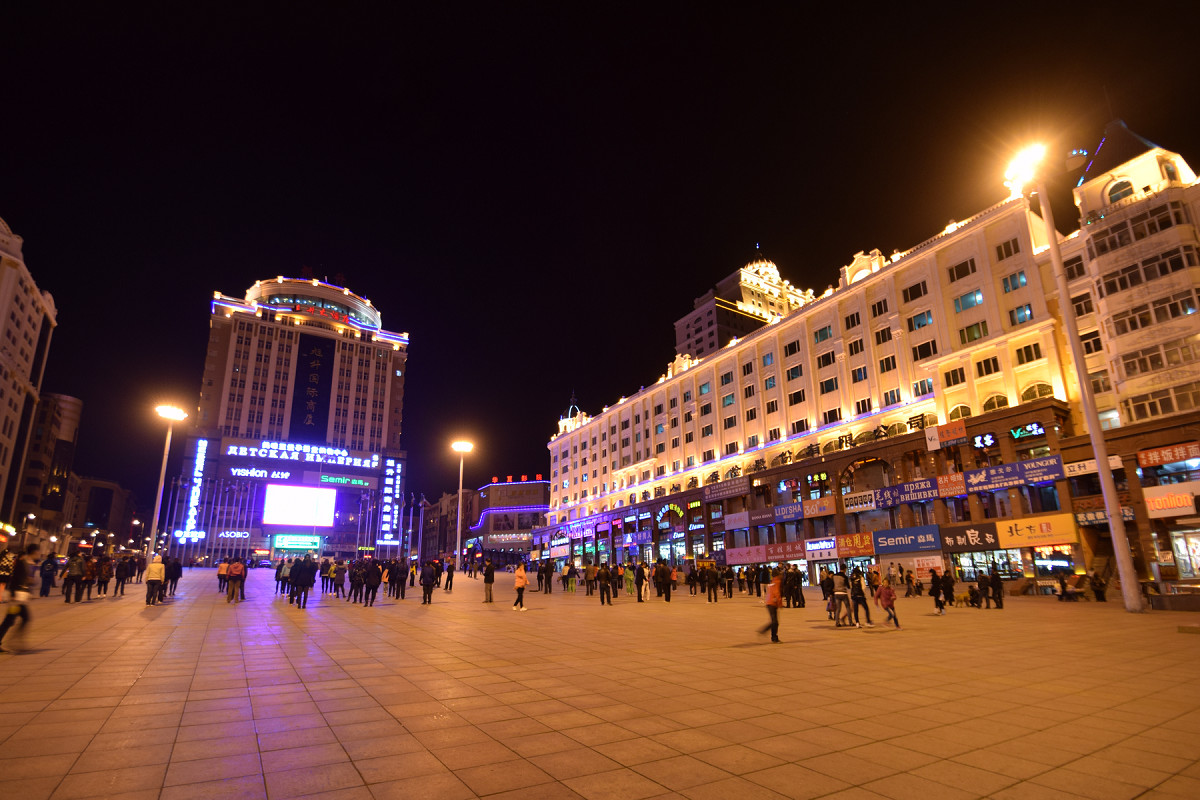
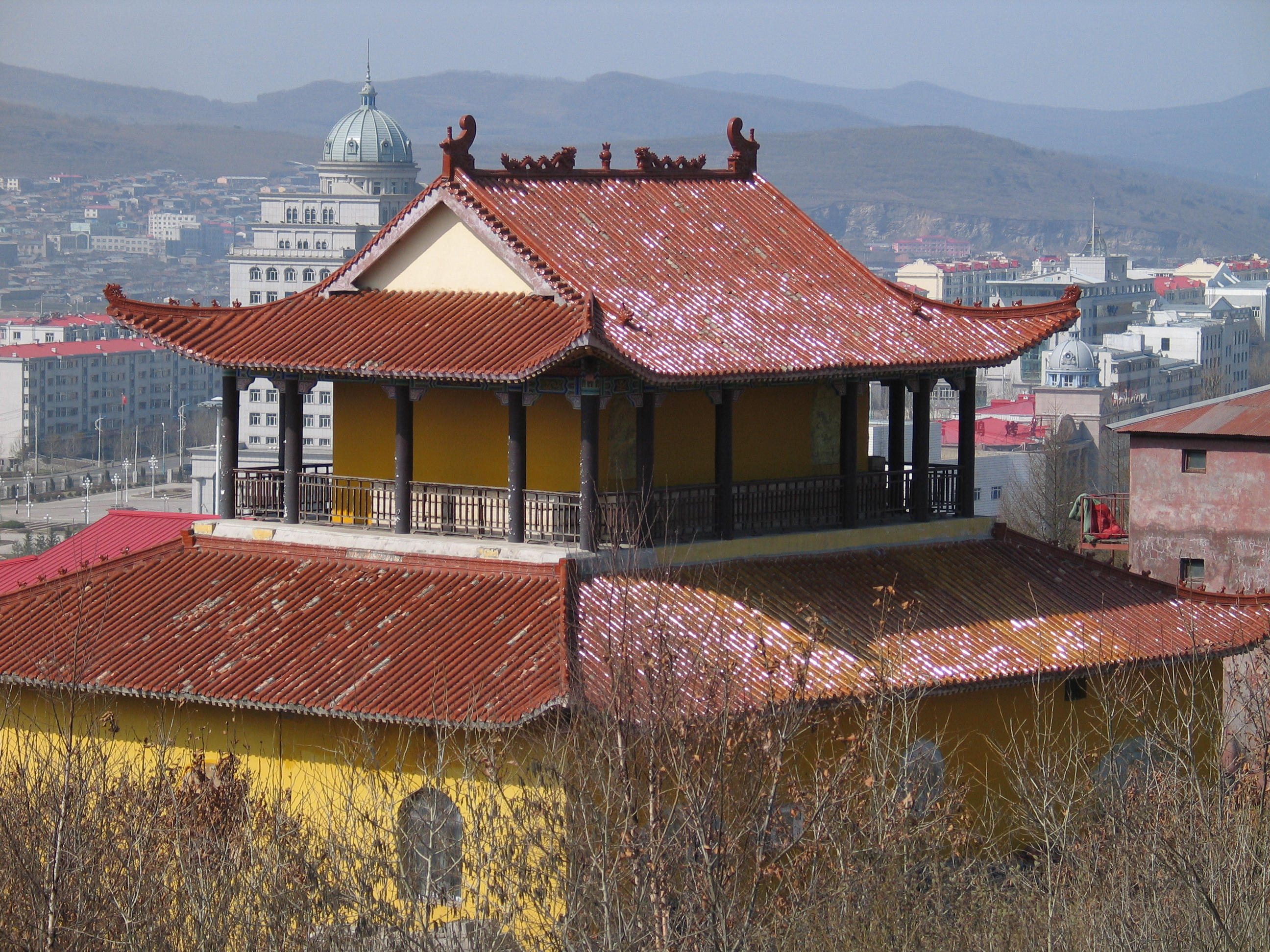
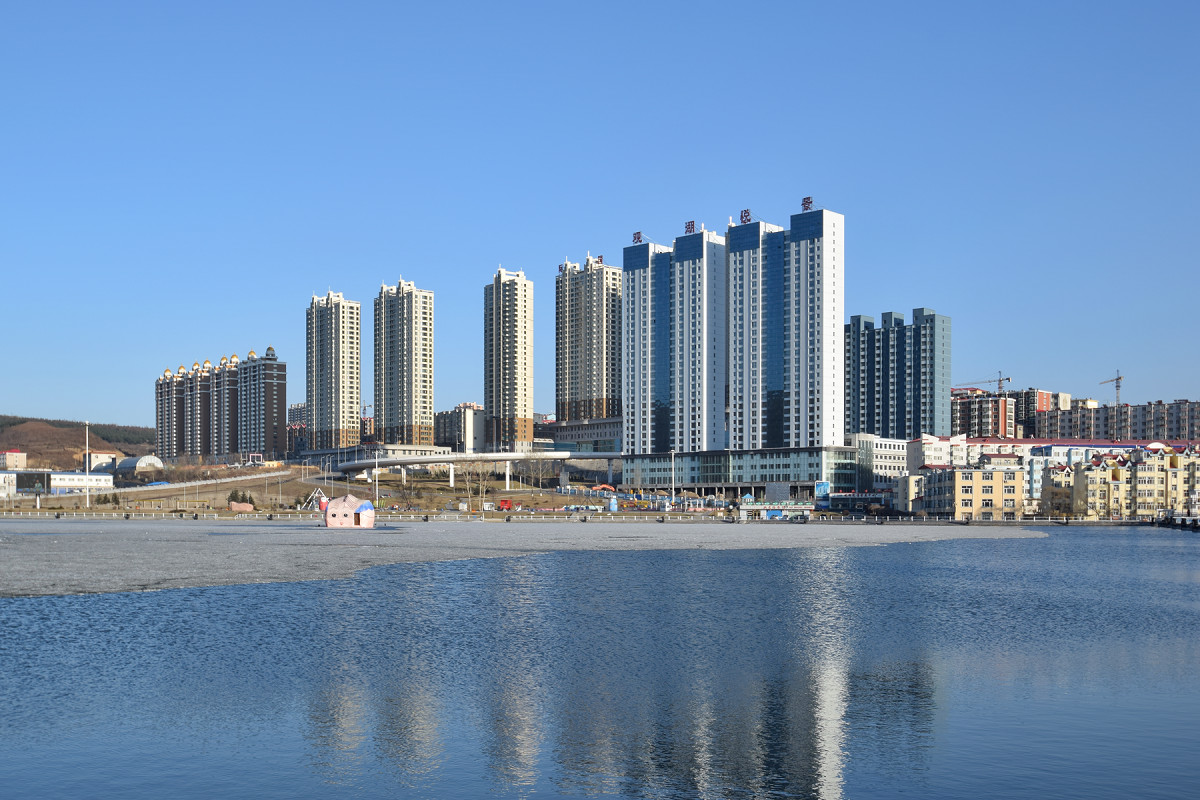
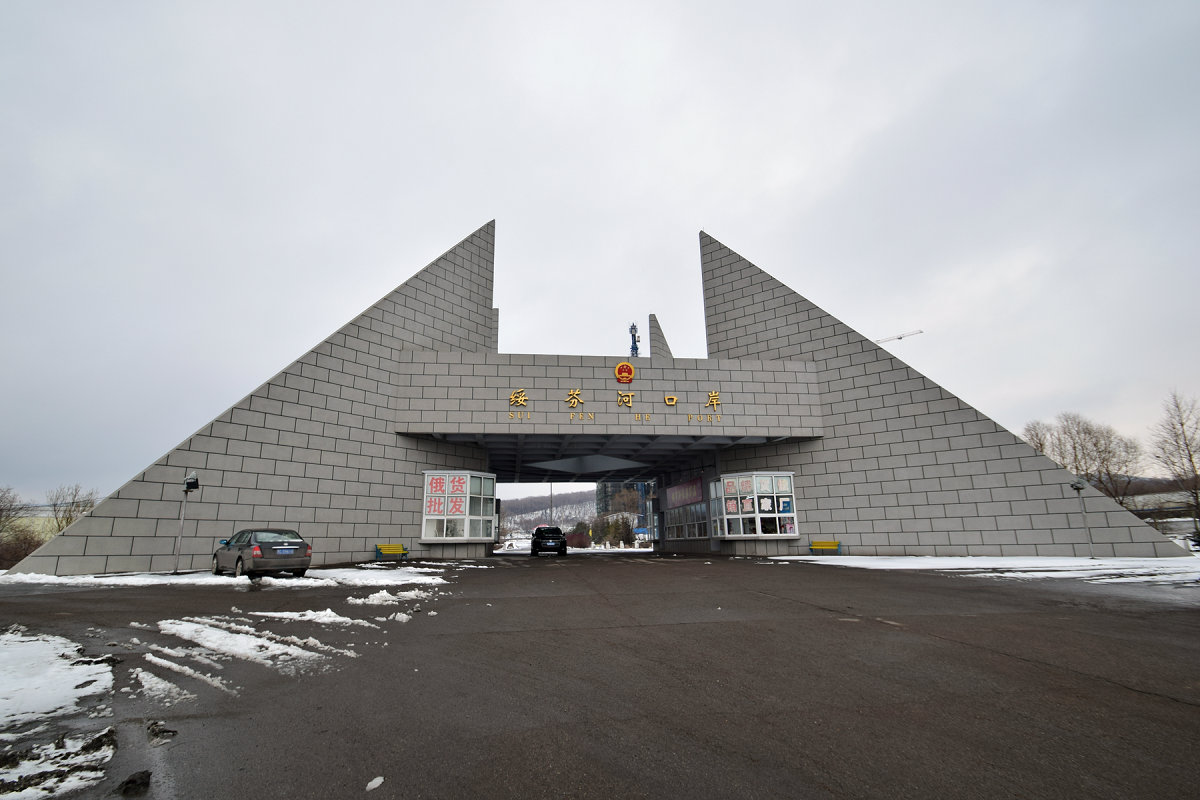
- Clockwise from top: Suifenhe Railway Station, Da Guangming Temple, "National Gate" on the China–Russia border, downtown Suifenhe, Central Square

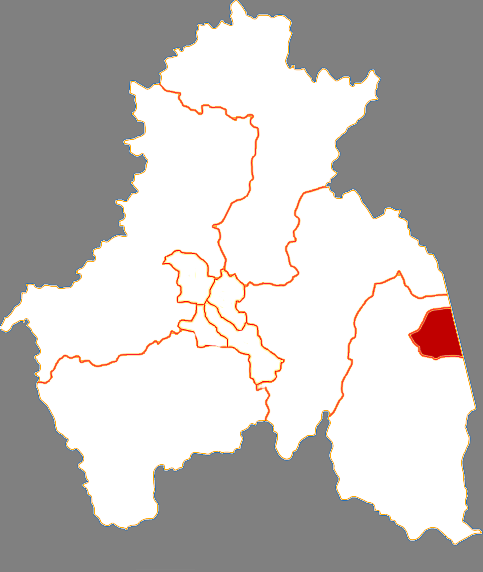
- Suifenhe in Mudanjiang

- Location in Heilongjiang
- Coordinates (Suifenhe municipal government): 44°24′45″N 131°09′06″E
- Country: People's Republic of China
- Province: Heilongjiang
- Prefecture-level city: Mudanjiang
- Township-level divisions: 2 towns
- Municipal seat: Suifenhe Town (绥芬河镇)

Area
  - Total: 460 km^{2} (180 sq mi)
- Elevation: 464 m (1,522 ft)

Population
  - Total: 100,000
  - Density: 220/km^{2} (560/sq mi)
- Time zone: UTC+8 (China Standard)
- Postal code: 157300
- Area code: 0453
- Climate: Dwb
- Website: suifenhe.gov.cn

Suifenhe
- Simplified Chinese: 绥芬河
- Traditional Chinese: 綏芬河
- Postal: Suifenho
Transcriptions
Standard Mandarin
- Hanyu Pinyin: Suífēnhé
- Wade–Giles: Sui^{2}-fen^{1}-ho^{2}

Suifenhe (Chinese: 绥芬河) is a county-level city in southeastern Heilongjiang province, People's Republic of China, located where the former Chinese Eastern Railway crosses the border with Russia's town of Pogranichny, Primorsky Krai. In January 2014, Suifenhe became the only Chinese city in which trading with Russian Ruble is officially allowed. The city shares its name with the Suifen River, and is under the administration of Mudanjiang Prefecture-level City.

Suifenhe and the surrounding border areas were scenes of vicious combat when the Soviet Union invaded Japanese-occupied Manchuria in August 1945.

== Geography and climate ==
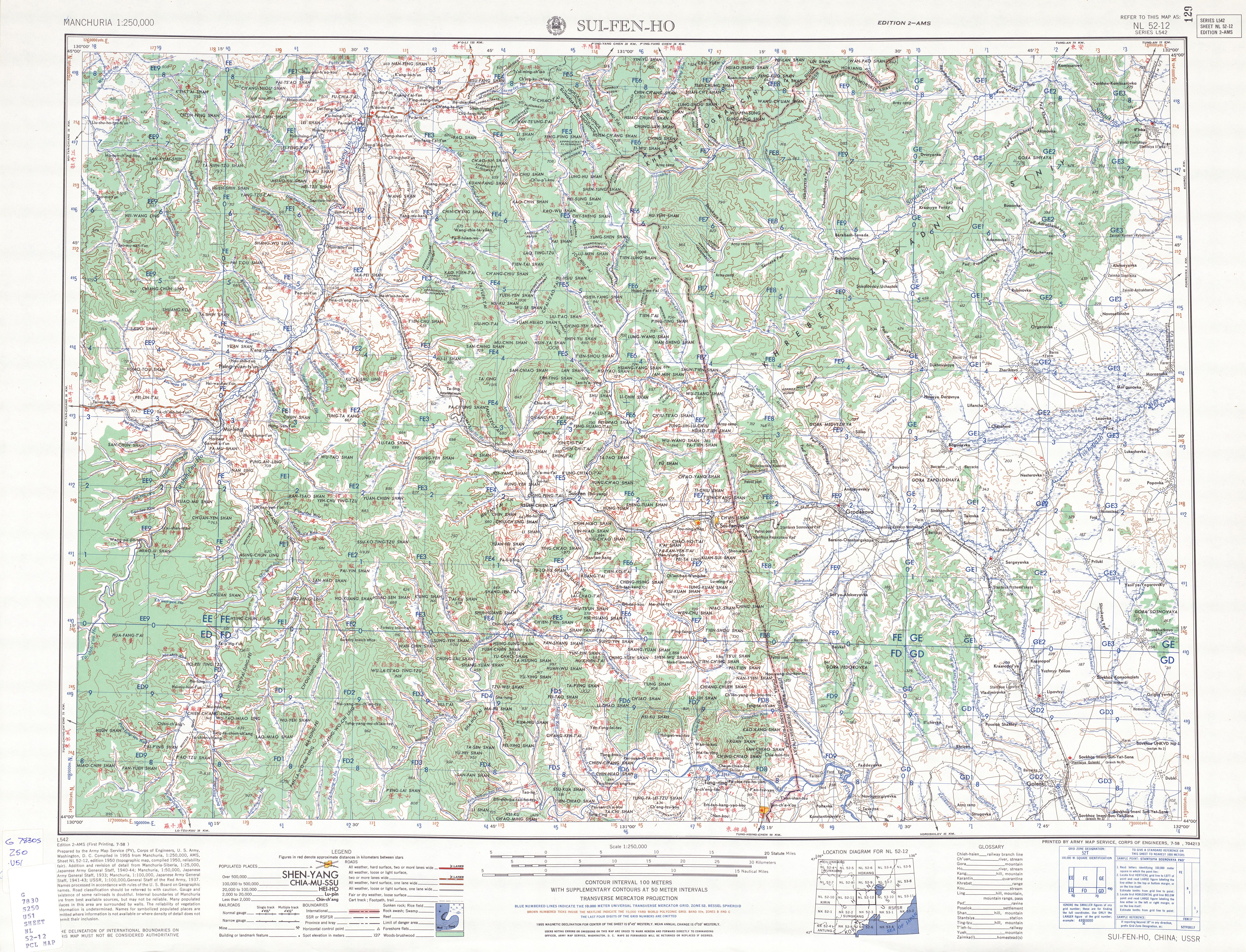
Suifenhe (labelled as Sui-fen-ho 綏芬河) (1955)

Suifenhe has a monsoon-influenced humid continental climate (Köppen Dwb), with long, very cold, but dry winters, and warm, humid summers. The monthly 24-hour average temperatures range from −16.1 °C (3.0 °F) in January to 19.3 °C (66.7 °F) in July, and the annual mean is +3.17 °C (37.7 °F). Precipitation is light in the winter, and more than 2/3 of the year's precipitation occurs from June to September. With monthly percent possible sunshine ranging from 44% in July to 64% in January and February, the city receives 2,413 hours of bright sunshine annually, with the latter half of winter being especially sunny.

Climate data for Suifenhe, elevation 568 m (1,864 ft), (1991–2020 normals, extremes 1951–2010)
Month	Jan	Feb	Mar	Apr	May	Jun	Jul	Aug	Sep	Oct	Nov	Dec	Year
Record high °C (°F)	5.1 (41.2)	10.0 (50.0)	17.0 (62.6)	28.2 (82.8)	31.7 (89.1)	33.9 (93.0)	35.3 (95.5)	34.4 (93.9)	29.6 (85.3)	27.1 (80.8)	17.5 (63.5)	8.2 (46.8)	35.3 (95.5)
Mean daily maximum °C (°F)	−10.5 (13.1)	−6.0 (21.2)	1.3 (34.3)	11.2 (52.2)	18.0 (64.4)	22.1 (71.8)	24.7 (76.5)	24.2 (75.6)	19.5 (67.1)	11.6 (52.9)	0.0 (32.0)	−8.7 (16.3)	9.0 (48.1)
Daily mean °C (°F)	−15.7 (3.7)	−11.6 (11.1)	−4.1 (24.6)	5.2 (41.4)	11.7 (53.1)	16.4 (61.5)	19.7 (67.5)	19.1 (66.4)	13.3 (55.9)	5.5 (41.9)	−5.0 (23.0)	−13.5 (7.7)	3.4 (38.1)
Mean daily minimum °C (°F)	−19.8 (−3.6)	−16.3 (2.7)	−9.1 (15.6)	−0.6 (30.9)	5.7 (42.3)	11.1 (52.0)	15.4 (59.7)	14.9 (58.8)	7.8 (46.0)	0.2 (32.4)	−9.2 (15.4)	−17.4 (0.7)	−1.4 (29.4)
Record low °C (°F)	−33.4 (−28.1)	−31.0 (−23.8)	−24.1 (−11.4)	−13.0 (8.6)	−4.3 (24.3)	0.4 (32.7)	6.9 (44.4)	3.6 (38.5)	−6.7 (19.9)	−15.4 (4.3)	−27.6 (−17.7)	−32.3 (−26.1)	−33.4 (−28.1)
Average precipitation mm (inches)	8.4 (0.33)	7.0 (0.28)	17.1 (0.67)	31.4 (1.24)	76.7 (3.02)	93.6 (3.69)	124.7 (4.91)	128.6 (5.06)	68.7 (2.70)	39.8 (1.57)	22.9 (0.90)	10.5 (0.41)	629.4 (24.78)
Average precipitation days (≥ 0.1 mm)	6.0	5.3	8.4	9.4	14.3	15.0	15.5	15.0	10.8	8.3	7.6	7.2	122.8
Average snowy days	9.0	8.7	12.1	7.3	0.7	0	0	0	0.1	3.3	9.7	10.8	61.7
Average relative humidity (%)	65	59	57	54	64	78	84	84	75	61	63	66	68
Mean monthly sunshine hours	175.4	188.3	216.7	200.3	215.8	209.9	192.8	193.4	217.4	203.9	161.2	155.1	2,330.2
Percentage possible sunshine	61	64	58	49	47	45	41	45	59	61	57	57	54
Source: China Meteorological Administration

== Administrative divisions ==
Suifenhe administers two towns:

- Suifenhe Town (绥芬河镇)
- Funing Town (阜宁镇)

== Transport ==
=== Road ===
Suifenhe is also a terminus of both G10 Suifenhe–Manzhouli Expressway and China National Highway 301, which run northwest to Manzhouli (Inner Mongolia), which is another China–Russia port-of-entry.

=== Road and rail border crossing ===
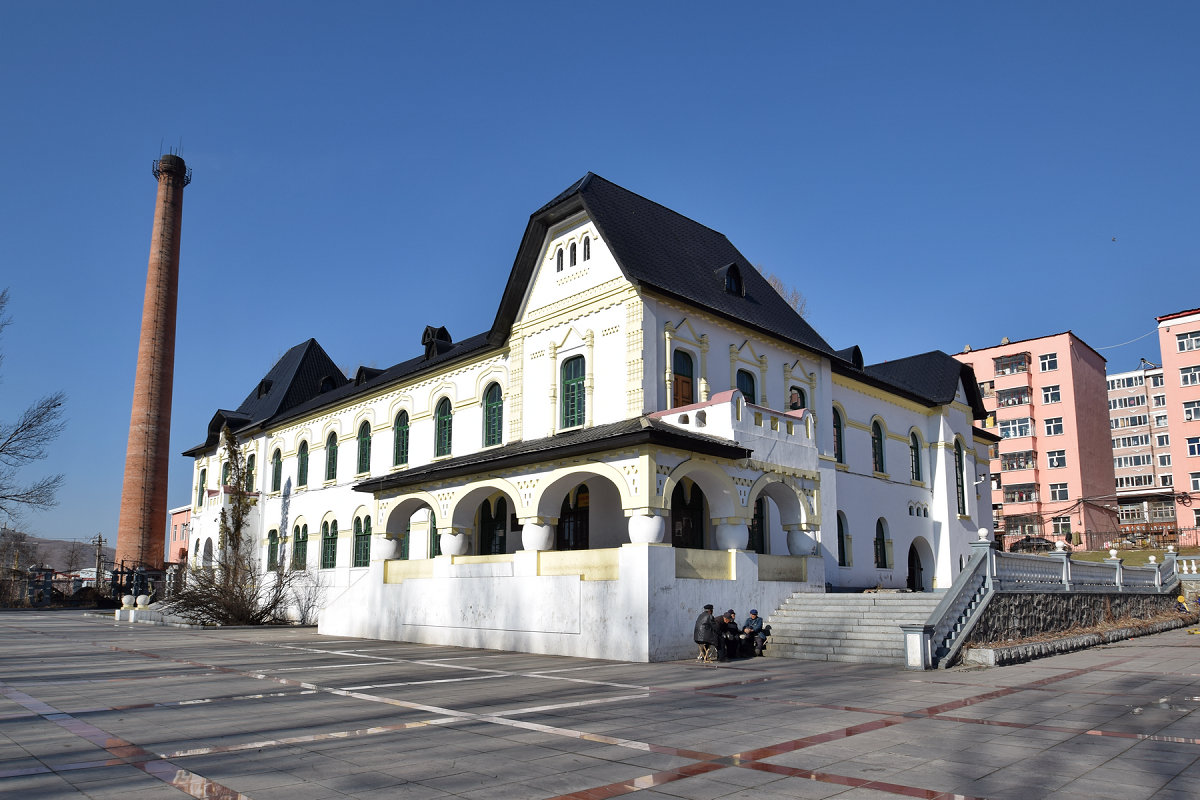
A former office of the Chinese Eastern Railway, now a museum

Suifenhe is one of the points where China's and Russia's railway systems connect through a rail border crossing on the Sino-Russian border. The rail line was originally constructed as the Chinese Eastern Railway in the early 20th century, but now serves as the terminus of the Harbin-Suifenhe Railway. The train station on the opposite side of the border is Grodekovo, in the town of Pogranichny, Primorsky Krai.

As of October 2025, train 401/402 makes the 26-km trip between Suifenhe and Grodekovo daily; however, no other scheduled passenger trains operate through the border at Suifenhe.

The cross-border rail line is important for freight transportation. As of 2015, the main cargo entering China from Russia over this railway crossing is iron ore; at 1.3 million tons over the first 5 months of the year, it constitutes about 1/3 of the total import cargo volume.

The G10 Suifenhe–Manzhouli Expressway and China National Highway 301, which terminates at Suifenhe is connected via a road border crossing to Russia's A184 Highway. The nearest city to the crossing on the Russian side is Pogranichny.

=== Airport ===
Suifenhe Dongning Airport opened on 28 December 2024.
