= Dagur language =

Mongolic language

Dagur
- Daghur, Dahur, Daur
- Даор Усуву ᡩᠠᠣ‍ᠷ ᡠᠰᡠᠸᡠ; Daor Usuwu (Hailar) ᡩᠠᠸᡠᠷ ᡴᡝᠯ Dagur Kel (Qiqihar)
- Pronunciation: [daɔr usuɣu]
- Native to: China, Mongolia, Russia
- Region: China: Inner Mongolia, Heilongjiang Province, Xinjiang
- Ethnicity: Daur
- Native speakers: (China: 91,000 cited 1999)
- Language family: Serbi–Mongolic: Mongolic; Dagur
- Writing system: Latin script Mongol script Cyrillic script Manchu script (historically)

Language codes
- ISO 639-3: dta
- Glottolog: daur1238
- ELP: Dagur
- Dagur is classified as Definitely Endangered by the UNESCO Atlas of the World's Languages in Danger.

The Dagur, Daghur, Dahur, or Daur language, is a Mongolic language, as well as a distinct branch of the Mongolic language family, and is primarily spoken by members of the Daur ethnic group.

There is no written standard in use, although a Pinyin-based orthography has been devised; instead the Dagur make use of Mongolian or Chinese, as most speakers know these languages as well. During the time of the Qing dynasty, Dagur was written with the Manchu alphabet.

== Distribution ==
Dagur is a Mongolic language consisting of five dialects:

- Amur Dagur in the vicinity of Heihe (original homeland). About 400 people.
- Nonni Dagur on the west side of the Nonni River from south of Qiqihar up to Morin Dawa Daur Autonomous Banner. Speakers of Nonni Dagur are usually grouped into the following four dialects:
  - Morin Daba Dagur, in Morin Dawa Daur Autonomous Banner (Moli Daba) of Hulun Buir League, Inner Mongolia
  - Butha (Buteha) (Northern) Dagur, immediately south of Morin Dawa Daur Autonomous Banner
  - Tsitsikar (Southern) Dagur, in Tsitsikar (Qiqihar) City and surrounding areas
  - Mergen Dagur or Nenjiang Dagur, in Nenjiang County (formerly Mergen County) of Heilongjiang Province
- Hailar Dagur to the south-east of Hailar in Ewenki Autonomous Banner
- Sinkiang Dagur in Xinjiang in the vicinity of Tacheng

== Phonology ==
Dagur phonology is peculiar in that some of its dialects have developed a set of labialized consonants (e.g. /sʷar/ 'flea' vs. /sar/ 'moon'), while it shares palatalized consonants with most Mongolian dialects that have not been developed in the other Mongolic languages. It also has /f/, which is, however, limited to loan words. Word-final short vowels were lost and historically short vowels in non-initial syllables have lost phoneme status. Dagur is the only Mongolic language to share this development with Mongolian (i.e. Mongolian proper, Oirat, Buryat). Due to the merger of /ɔ/ and /ʊ/ with /o/ and /u/, vowel harmony was lost. According to Tsumagari (2003), vowel harmony is still a productive synchronic phonotactic aspect of Dagur in which initial syllable long vowels are divided into "masculine" (back), "feminine" (front), and neutral groups. Likewise, suffixal long vowels must agree in harmonic group with the root.

=== Vowels ===
Dagur vowels (Chuluu 1994)
	Front		Central		Back	
	short	long	short	long	short	long
Close	i	iː			u	uː
Mid	e	eː	ə	əː	ɔ	ɔː
Open					a	aː

=== Consonants ===
Dagur consonants (Chuluu 1994)
		Labial			Alveolar			Postalveolar		Velar		
		plain	lab.	pal.	plain	lab.	pal.	plain	lab.	plain	lab.	pal.
Stop/ Affricate	voiceless	p			t	tʷ	tʲ	tʃ	tʃʷ	k	kʷ	kʲ
Stop/ Affricate	voiced	b		bʲ	d	dʷ	dʲ	dʒ	dʒʷ	ɡ		ɡʲ
Fricative		f			s	sʷ		ʃ		x	xʷ	xʲ
Nasal		m	mʷ	mʲ	n		nʲ			ŋ		
Trill					r		rʲ					
Lateral					l		lʲ					
Semivowel							j				w	

== Writing system ==
Letters	Contextual forms			Transliteration		International Phonetic Alphabet
Letters	Initial	Medial	Final	Latin	Cyrillic	International Phonetic Alphabet
ᠠ	ᠠ‍	‍ᠠ‍	‍ᠠ ‍ᠠ᠋	a	а	/a/
ᠡ	ᠡ‍	‍ᠡ‍	‍ᠡ ‍ᠡ᠋	e	э	/ə/
ᠢ	ᠢ‍	‍ᠢ‍	‍ᠢ	i	и	/i/
ᠣ	ᠣ‍	‍ᠣ‍	‍ᠣ	o	о	/ɔ/
ᠦ	ᡠ‍	‍ᡠ᠊᠋‍	‍᠊ᡠ	u	у	/u/
ᠨ	ᠨ‍	‍ᠨ‍ ‍ᠨ᠋‍	‍ᠨ ‍ᠨ᠎	n	н	/n/
ᠩ	—	‍ᠩ‍	‍ᠩ	ng	нг	/ŋ/
ᠪ	ᠪ‍	‍ᠪ‍	‍ᠪ	b	б	/b/
ᡦ᠊	ᡦ᠊‍	‍᠊ᡦ᠊‍	—	p	п	/p/
ᡥ᠊	ᡥ᠊‍ ‍ᡭ᠊᠎	‍᠊ᡥ᠊ ‍᠊ᡭ᠊᠎	—	h	х	/x/
ᠬ	ᠬ ‍ᠺ᠊᠎	‍ᠬ‍ ‍᠊ᠺ᠊᠎	‍ᠬ	k	к	/k/
ᡤ᠊	ᡤ᠊ ‍ᡬ᠊᠋‍	‍ᡤ᠊‍ ‍᠊ᡬ᠊᠋‍	‍‍ᠭ᠎	g	г	/g/
ᠮ	ᠮ‍	‍ᠮ‍	‍ᠮ	m	м	/m/
ᠯ	ᠯ‍	‍ᠯ‍	‍ᠯ	l	л	/l/
ᠰ	ᠰ‍	‍ᠰ‍	‍ᠰ	s	с	/s/
ᡧ᠊	ᡧ᠊‍	‍᠊ᡧ᠊‍	‍᠊ᡧ	x	ш	/ʃ/
ᠲ	ᠲ‍	‍ᠲ‍	‍ᠲ	t	т	/t/
ᡩ᠊	ᡩ᠊‍	‍᠊ᡩ᠊‍	‍ᡩ᠊	d	д	/d/
ᠴ	ᠴ‍	‍ᠴ‍	‍‍ᠴ	q	ч	/t͡ʃ/
ᠵ	ᠵ‍	‍ᠵ‍	‍‍‍ᠵ	j	ж	/d͡ʒ/
ᠶ	ᠶ‍	‍ᠶ‍	‍ᠶ	y	й	/j/
ᠸ	ᠸ‍	‍᠊ᠸ᠊‍	‍᠊ᠸ	w	в	/w/
ᠷ	ᠷ‍	‍ᠷ‍	‍ᠷ	r	р	/r/

== Grammar ==
Dagur has a pronominal system that distinguishes between first person plural inclusive /bed/ and exclusive /baː/ and, even more archaic, it distinguishes between third person singular /iːn/ and plural /aːn/. While the phoneme /t͡ʃ/ (< *t͡ʃʰ) has been retained, the second person singular pronoun has become /ʃiː/ nevertheless, resembling a more thorough sound change in Khorchin Mongolian. The second person plural is retained as /taː/. The genitive and accusative have fused in some variants, becoming –ji, and the ablative may assume the form of the instrumental case. The old comitative has been lost, while the innovated comitative is the same as in Mongolian. In addition, several other cases have been innovated that are not shared by Mongolian, including a new allative, -maji.

Dagur has a fairly simple tense-aspect system consisting of the nonpast markers -/bəi/ and (marginally) -/n/ and the past forms -/sən/ and (marginally) /la/ and the non-finite imperfective marker -/d͡ʒa/-. These may be inflected for person. The attributive particle forms are limited to –/ɡʷ/ (< Written Mongolian -γ-a) for imperfective aspect and future tense, -sən (< -γsan) for perfective aspect, -/ɡat͡ʃ/ (< -gči) for habituality (instead of -daγ which used to fulfil this function) and -/mar/ for potential and probable actions. It has acquired a highly complex converbal system containing several innovations. Notably, -mar which is a participle in Mongolian serves as a converb as well.

=== Grammatical case suffix table ===
Case	Marker	Note	Example	Meaning
Genitive	-ei	Added to words ending in a consonant (except j, q, x)	битегей biteg + ei → bitegei	of the book
Genitive	-ei	Added to words ending in a consonant (except j, q, x)	хелегей heleg + ei → helegei	
Genitive	-ei	Added to words ending in a consonant (except j, q, x)	адусей adus + ei → adusei	
Genitive	-ei	Added to words ending in a consonant (except j, q, x)	аолэй aol + ei → aolei	of the mountain
Genitive	-ii	Added to words ending in j, q, x	кайчий kaiq + ii → kaiqii	of shears
Genitive	-ii	Added to words ending in j, q, x	оржий orj + ii → orjii	
Genitive	-ii	Added to words ending in j, q, x	тульший tulx + ii → tulxii	
Genitive	-i	Added to words ending in a short vowel	морий mori + i → morii	of the horse
Genitive	-i	Added to words ending in a short vowel	новуй nowu + i → nowui	of the dog
Genitive	-i	Added to words ending in a short vowel	дангай danga + i → dangai	of smoke
Genitive	-yi	Appended to words ending in long vowels and diphthongs	акааий akaa + yi → akaayi	older brother's
Genitive	-yi	Appended to words ending in long vowels and diphthongs	касооий kasoo + yi → kasooyi	of iron
Genitive	-yi	Appended to words ending in long vowels and diphthongs	даоий dao + yi → daoyi	of the song
Accusative	Same as genitive case			
Locative	-d	Added to the stem (if ending in a consonant d, t, k, s, j, q, x add an appropriate vowel before -d)	ширээд xiree + d → xireed	on the desk
Locative	-d	Added to the stem (if ending in a consonant d, t, k, s, j, q, x add an appropriate vowel before -d)	хорвуд horwu + d → horwud	in/on the cabinet
Locative	-d	Added to the stem (if ending in a consonant d, t, k, s, j, q, x add an appropriate vowel before -d)	тосод tos + d → tosod	in the oil
Instrumental	-aar, -eer, -oor	Added to words ending in consonants (except j, q, x) according to vowel harmony	сарпаар sarp + aar → sarpaar	using chopsticks
Instrumental	-aar, -eer, -oor	Added to words ending in consonants (except j, q, x) according to vowel harmony	лэкээр lek + eer → lekeer	
Instrumental	-aar, -eer, -oor	Added to words ending in consonants (except j, q, x) according to vowel harmony	топоор topoor + oor → topooroor	using an axe
Instrumental	-ier	Added to words ending in j, q, x	онкиэр onq + ier → onqier	using a knife
Instrumental	-ier	Added to words ending in j, q, x	оржиэр orj + ier → orjier	
Instrumental	-ar, -er, -or	Added according to vowel harmony to words ending in short vowels	дангаар danga + ar → dangaar	using smoke
Instrumental	-ar, -er, -or	Added according to vowel harmony to words ending in short vowels	галиэр gali + er → galier	using fire
Instrumental	-ar, -er, -or	Added according to vowel harmony to words ending in short vowels	мориэр mori + er → morier	using a horse
Instrumental	-ar, -er, -or	Added according to vowel harmony to words ending in short vowels	новуор nowu + or → nowuor	using a dog
Instrumental	-yaar, -yeer	Added according to vowel harmony to words ending in long vowels and diphthongs	чолоояар qoloo + yaar → qolooyaar	using a stone
Instrumental	-yaar, -yeer	Added according to vowel harmony to words ending in long vowels and diphthongs	касоояар kasoo + yaar → kasooyaar	using iron
Ablative	Same as instrumental case		The ablative form is sometimes -aas, -ees, -oos, -ies, -as, -es, -os, -yaas, -yees.	
Comitative	-tii	Added to the word stem	акаатий akaa + tii → akaatii	together with older brother
Comitative	-tii	Added to the word stem	эвээтий ewee + tii → eweetii	together with mom
Terminative	-qaar, -qeer	Added to the word stem according to vowel harmony	соочаар soo + qaar → sooqaar	up to the armpits
Terminative	-qaar, -qeer	Added to the word stem according to vowel harmony	сакчаар sak + qaar → sakqaar	up to the ankles

=== Personal reflexive relationship suffixes ===
Pronoun	Number	Marker	Example	Meaning
1st	Singular	mini	жакмини jakmini	my stuff/thing
1st	Singular	mini	хороомини horoomini	my finger
1st	Plural (exclusive)	-maani	себмаани sebmaani	our teacher
1st	Plural (inclusive)	-naani	себнаани sebnaani	our teacher
2nd	Singular	-xini	васкалшини waskalxini	your clothing
2nd	Plural	-taani	гэритаани geritaani	your home
3rd	Singular	-ini	агини agini	his brother
3rd	Singular	-yini	экээйини ekeeyini	his sister
3rd	Plural	-inaani	этэвуйнаани eteewuinaani	their grandmother
3rd	Plural	-yinaani	ачайинаани aqaayinaani	their father

=== Imperative verb suffixes ===
Pronoun	Number	Volitional	Imperative	Prohibitive
1st	Singular	-яа -yaa		-гаан, -гээн -gaan, -geen
1st	Singular	-яа -yaa		-гаамини -gaamini
1st	Singular	-яа -yaa		-гэмини -geemini
1st	Plural (exclusive)	-яа -yaa		-гаамани -gaamaani
1st	Plural (exclusive)	-яа -yaa		-гээмани -geemaani
1st	Plural (inclusive)	-яа -yaa		-гааннаани -gaannaani
1st	Plural (inclusive)	-яа -yaa		-гээннаани -geennaani
2nd	Singular	-гаание -gaanie	(word stem)	-гааншини -gaanxini
2nd	Singular	-геение -geenie	(word stem)	-гээншини -geenxini
2nd	Plural	-гаантие -gaantie	-ту -tu	-гаантаани -gaantaani
2nd	Plural	-геентие -geentie	-ту -tu	-геентаани -geentaani
3rd	Singular & plural		-тгай -tgai	-гаанини -gaanini
3rd	Singular & plural		-тгай -tgai	-гээнини -geenini

=== Declarative verb suffixes ===
Time	Suffix	Example	Meaning
Present future tense	-bei	идбей (иден) idbei (iden)	(he) will eat
Present future tense	-n	яобей (явун) yaobei (yawun)	(she) will go
Past tense	-sen	идсен idsen	(she) ate
Past tense	-sen	яосен yaosen	(he) went

=== Pronouns' verb suffixes ===
==== Present future tense ====
Pronoun	Number	Marker	Example	Meaning
1st	Singular	-wei(-w)	Би харивей. Bi hariwei(hariw).	I return.
1st	Singular	-nbi	Би харинби. Bi harinbi.	I return.
1st	Plural (exclusive)	-waa	Баа хариваа. Baa hariwaa.	We return.
1st	Plural (exclusive)	-nbaa	Баа харинбаа. Baa harinbaa.	We return.
1st	Plural (inclusive)	-wdaa	Бид харивдаа. Bid hariwdaa.	We return.
1st	Plural (inclusive)	-ndaa	Бид хариндаа. Bid harindaa.	We return.
2nd	Singular	-beixi(-bxi)	Ши харибейши. Xi haribeixi.	You return.
2nd	Singular	-nxi	Ши харинши. Xi harinxi.	You return.
2nd	Plural	-beitaa (-btaa)	Таа харибейтаа. Taa haribeitaa (haribtaa).	You return.
2nd	Plural	-ntaa	Таа харинтаа. Taa harintaa.	You return.

==== Past tense ====
Pronoun	Number	Marker	Example	Meaning
1st	Singular	-senbi	Би харисенби. Bi harisenbi.	I returned.
1st	Plural (exclusive)	-senbaa	Баа харисенбаа. Baa harisenbaa.	We returned.
1st	Plural (inclusive)	-sendaa	Бид харисэндаа. Bid harisendaa.	We returned.
2nd	Singular	-senxi	Ши харисенши. Xi harisenxi.	You returned.
2nd	Plural	-sentaa	Таа харисентаа. Taa harisentaa.	You returned.

=== Adverb suffixes ===
Suffix	Notes	Example	Meaning
-j	Indicates parallel actions	Ийчиж ужсенби. iiqij ujsenbi.	I went to see (it).
-jie (dii)	Indicates that two actions are performed simultaneously	Саожие (дий) усвулжьжабей. Saojie (dii) uswuljjabei.	(She) sits while talking.
-aar, -eer, -oor	Indicates that the behavior occurred successively	Гараар ирсэн. Garaar irsen.	(He) came out.
-aar, -eer, -oor	Indicates that the behavior occurred successively	Энкуер яосэн. Enkuer yaosen.	(She) ate it.
-jii	Signifies the end of the act	Ужьжий яосэн. Ujjii yaosen.	(He) left after reading (it).
-jii	Signifies the end of the act	Иджий яо! Idjii yao!	Let's eat and (then) go.
-n ...-n	Indicates behaviors that occur together	Гуйн кариен яосэн. Guin karien yaosen.	(He) jumped and bounced away.
-mkii,-mklii	Indicates that the behavior occurs immediately	Мадемький (мэдемький) ичсэн. Medemkii (medemklii) iqsen.	(She) went as soon as (she) knew it.
-mder	Indicates that the behavior occurs immediately	Медемдерь (меднмкьлий) ичсэн. Medemder (medemklii) iqsen.	(She) went as soon as she knew it.
-wueter	Indicates readiness	Елвуетерь медсен. Elwueter medsen.	(She) will know as soon as (he) says it.
-aajaar, -eejeer (-eejaar), -oojaar	Indicates simultaneous act	Бариежаараа алдсэн. Bariejaaraa aldsen.	(He) grabbed it and let it go.
-rsaar, rseer	Indicates continuation and recurrence of behavior	Элерсеерь араан болсен. Elerseer araan bolsen.	How many times have you said it?
-aas, -ees, -oos	Express the condition of the behavior	Элеесшини укубей. Eleesxini ukubei.	If you say so, I'll give it to you.
-tgai q	Indicates concessive act	Учийкэн аатгай чукаатий. Uqiiken aatgai qukaatii.	Small but wise.
-worg, -wuar	Indicates the act to follow	Хийвуерь тортсен. Hiiwuer tortsen.	(She) decided to do (it).
-gaanie, -geenie	Expresses purpose	Уйгеени игсен. Uigeenie igsen.	(He) went to see (it).
-tel	Indicates behavioral boundaries	Яотельмини аасен. Yaotelmini aasen.	(He'll) be there until (she) leaves.
-tlaa(-tlaanie), tlee(-tleenie)	Expresses choice	Элтлеение хиисехдь уль денген. Eltleenie hiisehd ul dengen.	It's better to do (so).
-maak(-maaken), meek(-meken)	Indicates the proximity of behavior	Ванамаак (ванамаакен) болсен. Wanamaak (wanamaaken) bolsen.	(It's) about to fall.

=== Personal pronouns ===
	1st Person			2nd Person		3rd Person	
	singular	plural		singular	plural	singular	plural
	singular	exclusive	inclusive	singular	plural	singular	plural
Nominative	бий bii	биэде biede	баа baa	ший xii	таа taa	инг ing	аанг aang
Genitive	миний minii	биэдний biednii	мааний maanii	шиний xinii	тааний taanii	иний inii	ааний aanii
Dative	намд namd	биэдендэ biedende	маандэ maande	шамд xamd	таандэ taande	ямд (инд) yamd (ind)	аандэ aande
Accusative	намий namii	биэдний biednii	мааний maanii	шамий xamii	тааний taanii	ямий yamii	ааний aanii
Ablative	намаасэ namaase	биэденаас biedenaas	маанаас maanaas	шамаасэ xamaase	таанаас taanaas	ямаас yamaas	аанаас aanaas
Instrumental	намаарэ namaare	биэдэнаар biedenaar	маанаар maanaar	шамаарэ xamaare	таанаар taanaar	ямаар yamaar	аанаар aanaar
Comitative	намтий namtii	биэдентий biedentii	маантий maantii	шамтий xamtii	таантий taantii	ямтий yamtii	аантий aantii

== Lexicon ==
It is estimated that out of Dagur's entire language vocabulary, over half is Mongolic in origin. Additionally, while Dagur has over 50% common Mongolic vocabulary, it has borrowed 5 to 10% of its words from Chinese, as well as 10% of its words from Manchu, and a small number vocabulary borrowed from Evenki and Russian – leaving about 20% vocabulary that is specific to Dagur only.

=== Middle Mongol words ===
Dagur retains quite a few archaic Mongolic words, and although they are not commonly found in the modern Mongolic languages, they do appear in Middle Mongol sources, like the Hua-Yi yiyu and The Secret History of the Mongols. These words include:

- tergul ~ terwul (тэргул ~ тервул) ‘road’ (in Mongol *jam)
- najir (нажийр) ‘summer’ (Mongol *jun)
- xeky (хэкый) ‘head’ (Mongol *tologai)
- sorby (сорбый) ‘staff’ (Mongol *tayag)
- kasoo (касоо) ‘iron’
- saur (саур) ‘spade’
- ogw (огв) ‘brain’
- basert (басерть) ‘kidney’
- twalcig (твалциг) ‘knee’
- kataa (катаа) ‘salt’
- warkel (варкэль) ‘clothes’
- el- (эл-) ‘to say’ (cf. Mongol *kele-)

=== Numerals ===
All basic numerals are of Mongolic origin.

	English	Classical Mongolian	Dagur (Hailar)	Dagur (Qiqihar)
1	One	Nigen	Нэкэн; Neken	Neke
2	Two	Qoyar	Хойир; Hoir	Hoyir
3	Three	Ghurban	Гуарбан; Guarban	Guarbe
4	Four	Dorben	Дурубун; Durbun	Durbu
5	Five	Tabun	Таавун; Taawun	Taawu
6	Six	Jirghughan	Жиргөө; Jirwoo	Jirgoo
7	Seven	Dologhan	Долөөн; Doloon	Doloo
8	Eight	Naiman	Найман; Naiman	Naime
9	Nine	Yisun	Йсэн; Isen	Yise
10	Ten	Arban	Харбан; Harban	Harbe

== Bibliography ==
- Chuluu, Üjiyediin (1994), Introduction, Grammar, and Sample Sentences for Dagur (PDF), Sino-Platonic Papers, Philadelphia: University of Pennsylvania
- Engkebatu (2001): Cing ulus-un üy-e-dü dagur kele-ber bicigdegsen jokiyal-ud-un sudulul. Kökeqota: Öbür monggol-un yeke surgaguli-yin keblel-ün qoriy-a.
- Namcarai; Qaserdeni (1983), Daγur kele ba mongγul kelen-ü qaričaγulul, Öbür mongγul-un arad-un keblel-ün qoriy-a, OCLC 45024952
- Oyunčimeg, ed. (2004), Mongγul sudulul-un nebterkei toli, Kökeqota: Öbür mongγul-un arad-un keblel-ün qoriy-a, ISBN 978-7-204-07745-8, OCLC 67279589
- Sengge (2004): Daγur kele. In: Oyunčimeg 2004: 616-617.
- Sengge (2004a): Daγur kelen-ü abiy-a. In: Oyunčimeg 2004: 618.
- Sengge (2004b): Daγur kelen-ü üges. In: Oyunčimeg 2004: 619.
- Sengge (2004c): Daγur kelen-ü kele ǰüi. In: Oyunčimeg 2004: 618-622.
- Tsumagari, Toshiro (2003): Dagur. In: Janhunen, Juha (ed.) (2003): The Mongolic languages. London: Routledge: 129-153.
- Yu, Wonsoo, Jae-il Kwon, Moon-Jeong Choi, Yong-kwon Shin, Borjigin Bayarmend, Luvsandorj[in] Bold (2008): A study of the Tacheng dialect of the Dagur language. Seoul: Seoul National University Press
