= Harbin Zoo =

Harbin Northern Forest Zoo
- Interactive map of Harbin Northern Forest Zoo
- 45.391°N 127.100°E
- Date opened: 1954; 2004 (current site)
- Location: 46km Hamu Highway, Acheng District, Harbin
- No. of animals: 2,000
- Website: www.hrbzoo.com

Harbin Northern Forest Zoo (Chinese: 哈尔滨北方森林动物园; pinyin: Hā'ěrbīn Běifāng Sēnlín Dòngwùyuán), formerly Harbin Zoo (Chinese: 哈尔滨动物园), is the main zoological garden in Harbin. Occupying an area of 558 hectares (1,380 acres), it is the largest forest zoo in China. Several endangered animal species are preserved in the zoo, including Siberian tiger, white lion and red-crowned crane.

== Former sites ==
Former Harbin Zoo was located at 95 Hexing Road, Nangang District, Harbin before its relocation to the current site in 2004. Established as Yashkin Garden in 1899 by Russians in Manchuria, it served as the specimen garden of Northeast Forestry University. In 1954, Harbin municipal government transformed the garden into Harbin Zoo. Since then, polar bears, monkeys, lions, pandas and other various animals were introduced into the zoo.

The former site at Hexing Road was transformed into Science Park of Harbin Institute of Technology after the zoo's relocation to Acheng.
