= Hailar District =

Hailar 海拉尔区 • ᠬᠠᠶᠢᠯᠠᠷ ᠲᠣᠭᠣᠷᠢᠭ
- District
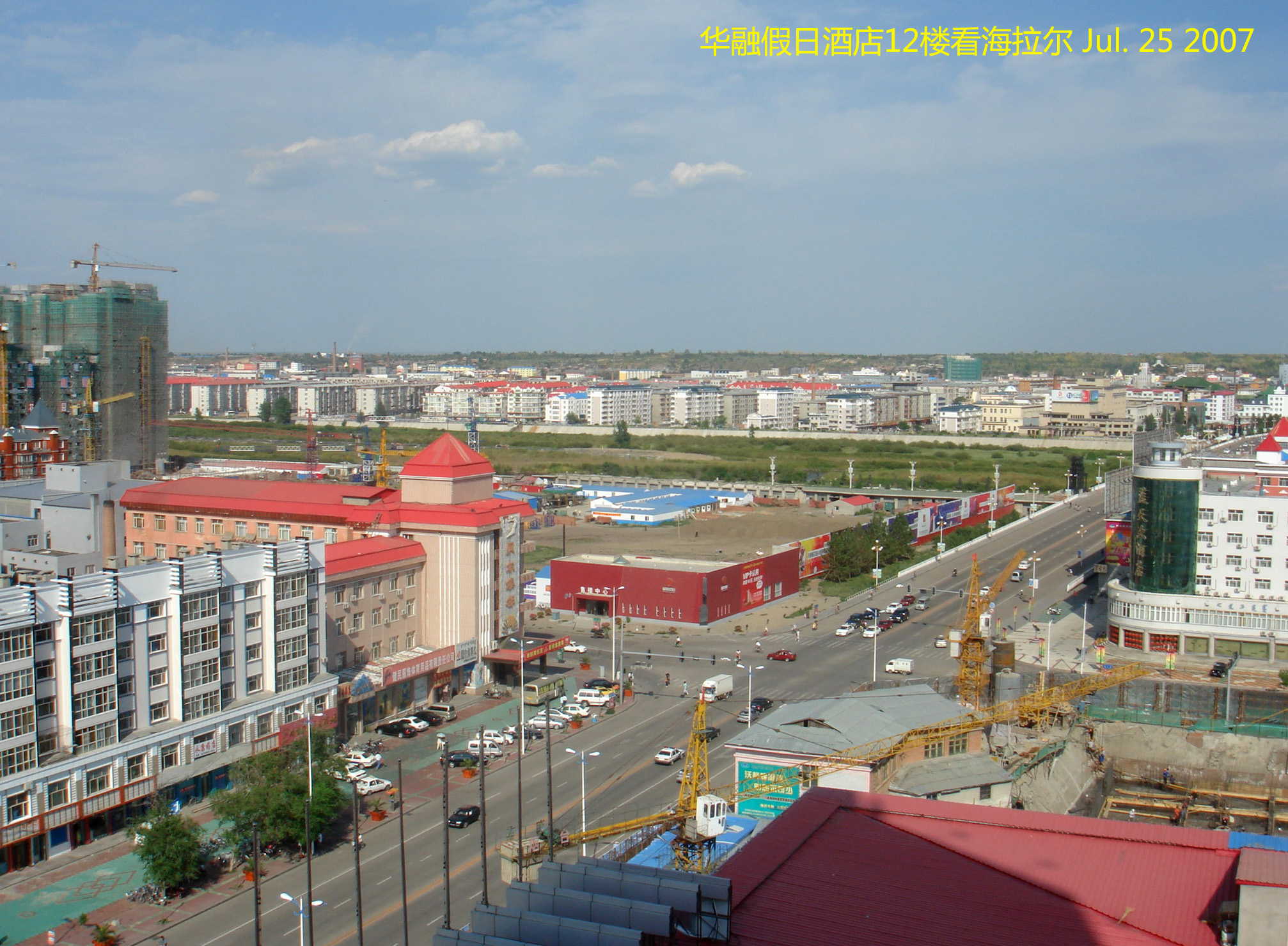
- Hailar in 2007

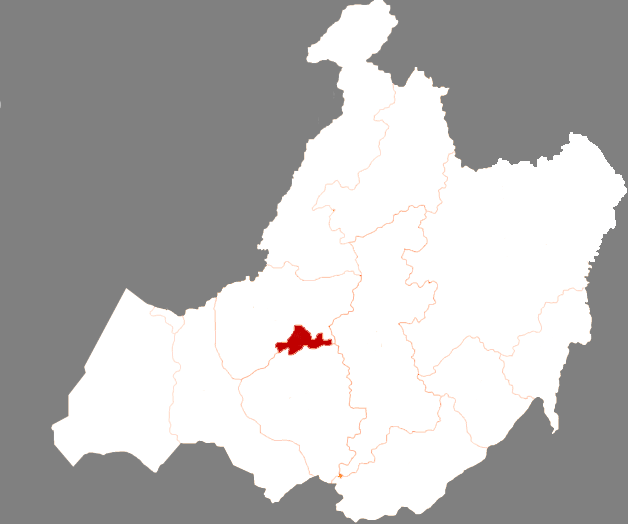
- Hailar in Hulunbuir

- Location in Inner Mongolia Hailar (China)
- Coordinates (Hailar District government): 49°14′05″N 119°49′28″E
- Country: China
- Autonomous region: Inner Mongolia
- Prefecture-level city: Hulunbuir
- District seat: Zhengyang Subdistrict

Area
  - Total: 1,319.8 km^{2} (509.6 sq mi)
- Elevation: 614 m (2,014 ft)

Population (2020)
  - Total: 365,012
  - Density: 276.57/km^{2} (716.30/sq mi)
- Time zone: UTC+8 (China Standard)
- Postal code: 021000
- Area code: 0470
- Website: www.hailar.gov.cn

Hailar District

Chinese name
- Traditional Chinese: 海拉爾區
- Simplified Chinese: 海拉尔区
Transcriptions
Standard Mandarin
- Hanyu Pinyin: Hǎilā'ěr Qū

Mongolian name
- Mongolian Cyrillic: Хайлаар Дүүрэг
- Mongolian script: ᠬᠠᠶᠢᠯᠠᠷ ᠲᠣᠭᠣᠷᠢᠭ
Transcriptions
- SASM/GNC: Qayilar toɣoriɣ

Hailar District, formerly a county-level city, is an urban district that serves as the seat of the prefecture-level city Hulunbuir in northeastern Inner Mongolia, China.

Long known as the "Pearl of the Grasslands", Hailar acts as a gateway between China and Russia. The district spans an area of 1,319.8 square kilometers, and has an estimated population of 365,000 as of 2010. The district serves as a regional center for commerce, trade, and transportation.

== History ==
Hailar was founded as a Chinese fort in 1734, and during the administration of the Republic of China, it was the capital city of Xing'an Province. It was a center of agricultural production on the historical Chinese Eastern Railway. Once known as Hulun, Hailar today is a relatively small, but thriving modern industrial city of around 300,000, its population has soared from an estimated 20,000 in the mid-20th century.

After the Mukden Incident in 1931, Japan invaded China's northeastern provinces and established the puppet state of Manchukuo. Hailar Fortress, a huge underground Japanese fortress, was completed in 1937 by forced Chinese laborers. The Kwantung Army garrisoned in Manchukuo built the fortress complex as one of the biggest Japanese fortifications in Manchukuo. Some of the fiercest fighting of the Soviet–Japanese War in August 1945 took place around Hailar. Prisoners of war and civilians were massacred by the Kwantung Army in August 1945 during the final month of World War II. The World Anti-fascist War Hailar Memorial Park, a museum and war memorial, is built on the site of the Hailar Fortress, parts of the fortress tunnels are open for public viewing.

== Transportation ==
Hulunbeier Hailar Airport serves the city, with flights to Beijing and Shenyang amongst others. Hailar's railway station is the penultimate major station before Manzhouli, the port city that stands close to the Russian border. It is on the famous Western line of the Trans-Siberian express route and China National Highway 301. Trains to Harbin take about 12 hours, and 27 to Beijing. Hailar has a frequent series of buses that cover the town.

== Geography ==
Hailar is located in close proximity to the Greater Xing'an Mountains, and has an elevation ranging from 603.0 to 776.6 m (1,978.3 to 2,547.9 ft). Of the city's 1,319.8 square kilometers, 28 square kilometers (or 2.12%) of the district is urban.

=== Administrative divisions ===
Hailar is divided into 7 subdistricts and 2 towns:

Name	Simplified Chinese	Hanyu Pinyin	Mongolian (Hudum Script)	Mongolian (Cyrillic)	Administrative division code
Subdistricts
Zhengyang Subdistrict	正阳街道	Zhèngyáng Jiēdào	ᠵᠧᠩ ᠶᠠᠩ ᠵᠡᠭᠡᠯᠢ ᠭᠤᠳᠤᠮᠵᠢ	Жен ян зээл гудамж	150702001
Jiankang Subdistrict	健康街道	Jiànkāng Jiēdào	ᠵᠢᠶᠠᠨ ᠺᠠᠩ ᠵᠡᠭᠡᠯᠢ ᠭᠤᠳᠤᠮᠵᠢ	Жаан кан зээл гудамж	150702002
Kaoshan Subdistrict	靠山街道	Kàoshān Jiēdào	ᠺᠣᠤ ᠱᠠᠨ ᠵᠡᠭᠡᠯᠢ ᠭᠤᠳᠤᠮᠵᠢ	Коо шин зээл гудамж	150702003
Shengli Subdistrict	胜利街道	Shènglì Jiēdào	ᠱᠧᠩ ᠯᠢ ᠵᠡᠭᠡᠯᠢ ᠭᠤᠳᠤᠮᠵᠢ	Шен ли зээл гудамж	150702004
Hulun Subdistrict	呼伦街道	Hūlún Jiēdào	ᠬᠥᠯᠥᠨ ᠵᠡᠭᠡᠯᠢ ᠭᠤᠳᠤᠮᠵᠢ	Гүүлэн зээл гудамж	150702005
Jianshe Subdistrict	建设街道	Jiànshè Jiēdào	ᠵᠢᠶᠠᠨᠱᠧ ᠵᠡᠭᠡᠯᠢ ᠭᠤᠳᠤᠮᠵᠢ	Жаанше зээл гудамж	150702007
Dongshan Subdistrict	东山街道	Dōngshān Jiēdào	ᠵᠡᠭᠦᠨ ᠠᠭᠤᠯᠠ ᠳ᠋ᠠᠬᠢ ᠵᠡᠭᠡᠯᠢ ᠭᠤᠳᠤᠮᠵᠢ	Зүүн уул даахь зээл гудамж	150702008
Towns
Hag Town	哈克镇	Hākè Zhèn	ᠬᠠᠭ ᠪᠠᠯᠭᠠᠰᠤ	Хаг балгас	150702100
Fendou Town	奋斗镇	Fèndòu Zhèn	ᠹᠧᠨᠳ᠋ᠧᠦ ᠪᠠᠯᠭᠠᠰᠤ	Фендуй балгас	150702101

=== Climate ===
Hailar has a dry-winter humid continental climate (Köppen Dwb). Winters are long, very dry and severe, due to the semi−permanent Siberian High, while summers are short, though very warm, and rather wet, due to the East Asian monsoon. The monthly 24-hour average temperature ranges from −24.8 °C (−12.6 °F) in January to 20.4 °C (68.7 °F) in July, while the annual mean is −0.40 °C (31.3 °F). With monthly percent possible sunshine ranging from 55% in December to 69% in February, sunshine is abundant year-round, and the annual total is 2,719 hours. More than two-thirds of the annual rainfall occurs during the three summer months. The Mohe-Huma-Hailar triangle between northern Heilongjiang and Northeastern Inner Mongolia, which is almost equivalent to China's subarctic climate zone, suffers the most severe cold winter in China. Hailar's extreme temperatures ranges from −48.2 to 37.7 °C (−54.8 to 99.9 °F).

Climate data for Hailar District, elevation 650 m (2,130 ft), (1991–2020 normals, extremes 1909–present)
Month	Jan	Feb	Mar	Apr	May	Jun	Jul	Aug	Sep	Oct	Nov	Dec	Year
Record high °C (°F)	−1.0 (30.2)	4.3 (39.7)	16.2 (61.2)	29.4 (84.9)	35.4 (95.7)	38.8 (101.8)	41.7 (107.1)	39.6 (103.3)	33.2 (91.8)	26.2 (79.2)	13.7 (56.7)	2.4 (36.3)	41.7 (107.1)
Mean daily maximum °C (°F)	−19.8 (−3.6)	−13.7 (7.3)	−3.2 (26.2)	9.7 (49.5)	18.9 (66.0)	24.9 (76.8)	26.7 (80.1)	24.7 (76.5)	18.2 (64.8)	7.9 (46.2)	−6.2 (20.8)	−17.1 (1.2)	5.9 (42.7)
Daily mean °C (°F)	−25.0 (−13.0)	−20.0 (−4.0)	−9.6 (14.7)	3.2 (37.8)	12.0 (53.6)	18.4 (65.1)	20.9 (69.6)	18.6 (65.5)	11.4 (52.5)	1.3 (34.3)	−11.8 (10.8)	−22.0 (−7.6)	−0.2 (31.6)
Mean daily minimum °C (°F)	−29.2 (−20.6)	−25.3 (−13.5)	−15.5 (4.1)	−2.9 (26.8)	4.9 (40.8)	11.8 (53.2)	15.4 (59.7)	13.1 (55.6)	5.5 (41.9)	−3.9 (25.0)	−16.3 (2.7)	−26.2 (−15.2)	−5.7 (21.7)
Record low °C (°F)	−42.9 (−45.2)	−42.3 (−44.1)	−37.2 (−35.0)	−21.6 (−6.9)	−11.1 (12.0)	0.0 (32.0)	5.3 (41.5)	1.1 (34.0)	−7.9 (17.8)	−23.9 (−11.0)	−38.0 (−36.4)	−42.8 (−45.0)	−42.9 (−45.2)
Average precipitation mm (inches)	3.9 (0.15)	3.6 (0.14)	5.9 (0.23)	13.8 (0.54)	24.9 (0.98)	53.3 (2.10)	96.5 (3.80)	78.6 (3.09)	35.7 (1.41)	16.8 (0.66)	6.7 (0.26)	6.9 (0.27)	346.6 (13.63)
Average precipitation days (≥ 0.1 mm)	6.3	4.6	4.7	5.3	7.6	11.9	13.9	12.1	8.7	6.4	6.8	8.5	96.8
Average snowy days	8.8	6.7	7.0	5.4	1.1	0.1	0	0	0.6	5.2	9.5	11.6	56
Average relative humidity (%)	75	75	68	50	45	57	66	68	62	61	72	77	65
Mean monthly sunshine hours	154.5	191.8	250.7	244.0	264.5	269.1	260.1	248.1	223.0	197.3	156.5	131.5	2,591.1
Percentage possible sunshine	57	66	67	59	56	56	54	56	60	60	58	52	58
Source: China Meteorological Administrationall-time extreme temperature

== Culture ==
Hailar is a multi-ethnic town, with notable Han, Mongolian, Hui, Daur, Evenki, Russian populations. As such, signs are usually bilingual and Mongolian influence pervades in songs played on shop CD players, domes on buildings and the everyday speech of some locals.

Composer Vladimir Ussachevsky was born in Hailar, as well as leading news anchor Bai Yansong; the folk metal band Nine Treasures also originated in Hailar.

== Sister city ==
- Chita, Zabaykalsky Krai, Russia.
- Chinggis City, Mongolia.

== Gallery ==
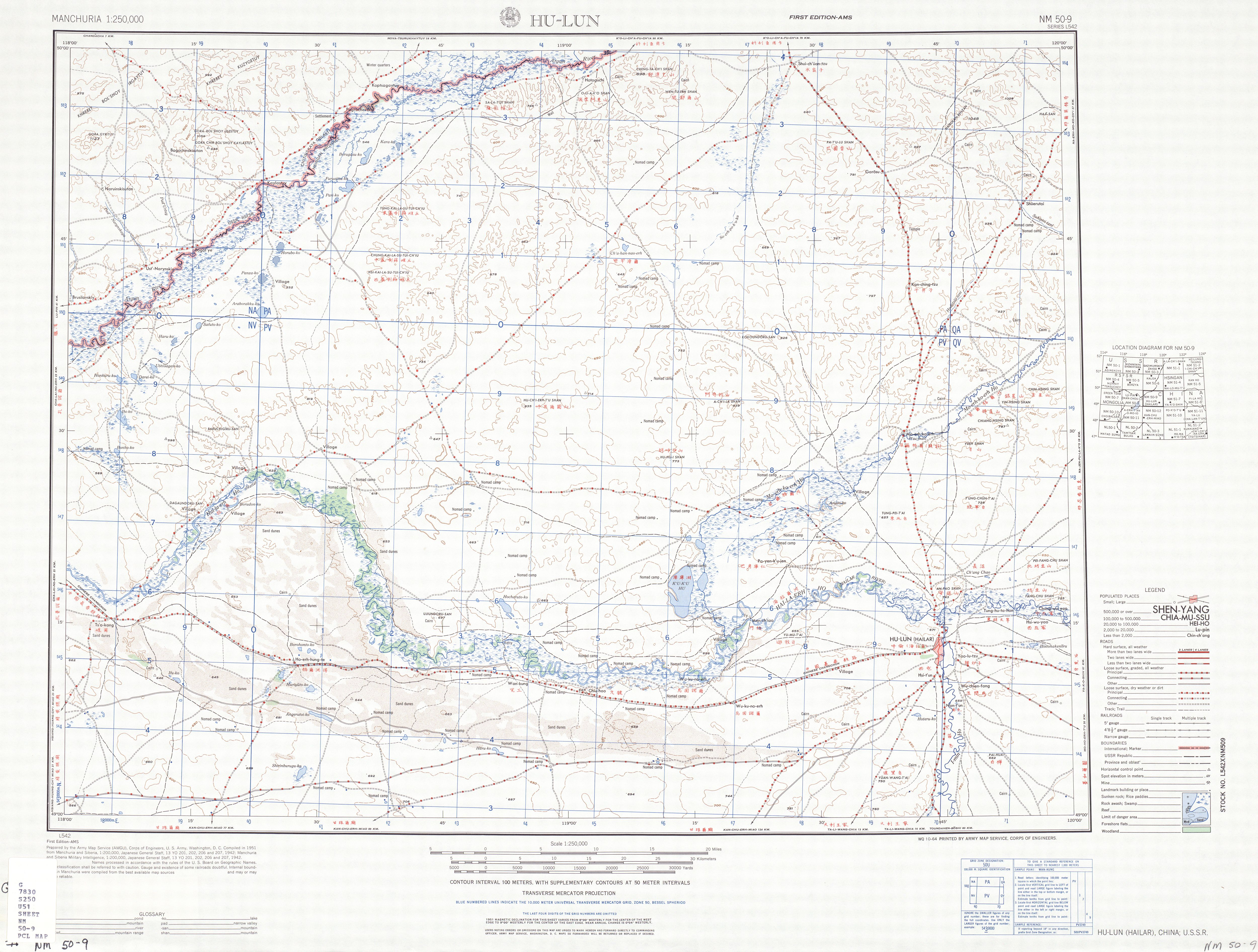
Hailar (labeled HU-LUN (HAILAR) 呼倫 (海拉爾)) (1951)

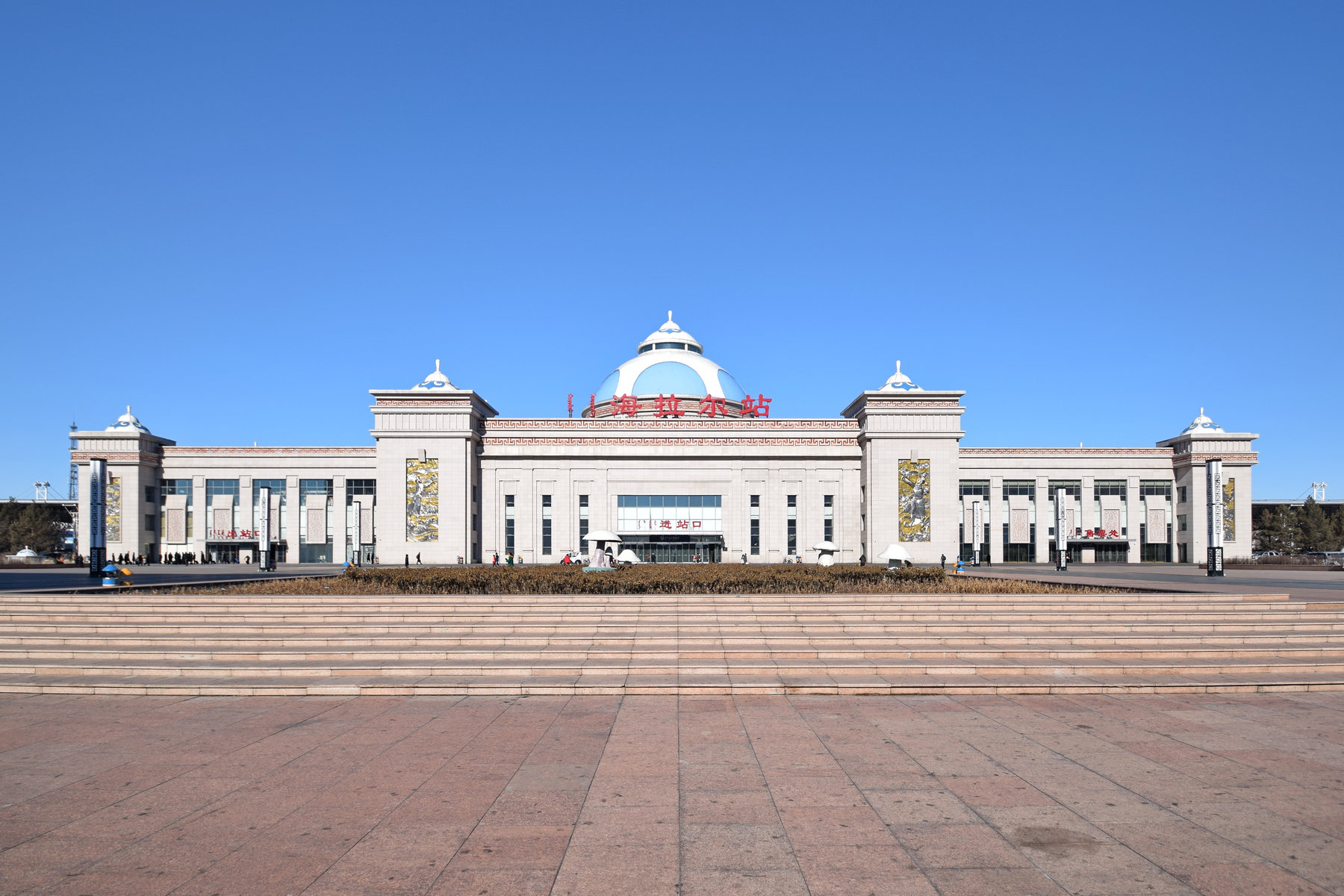
Hailar Railway Station

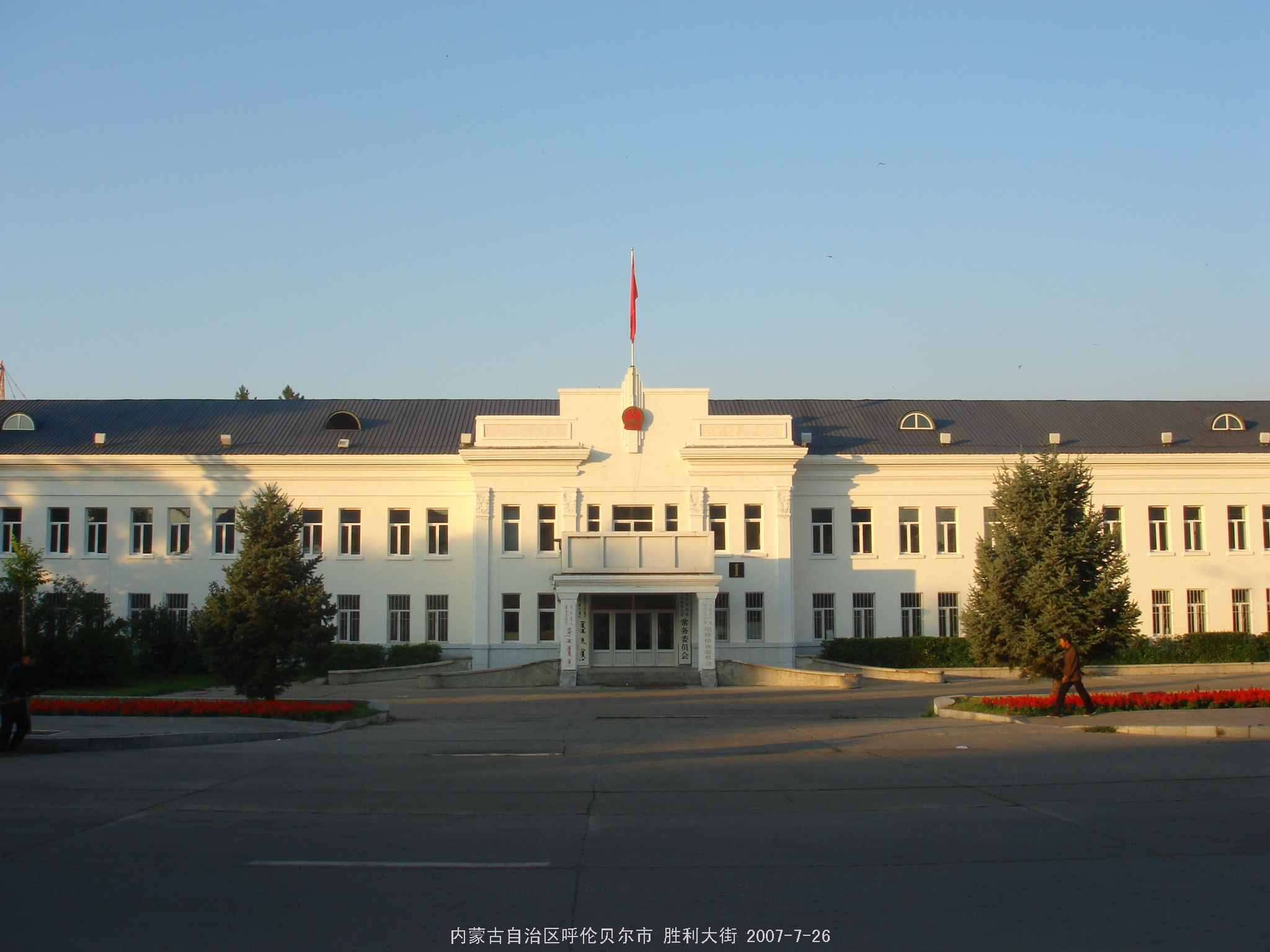
Hailar People's Congress
