= Yangmingtan Bridge =

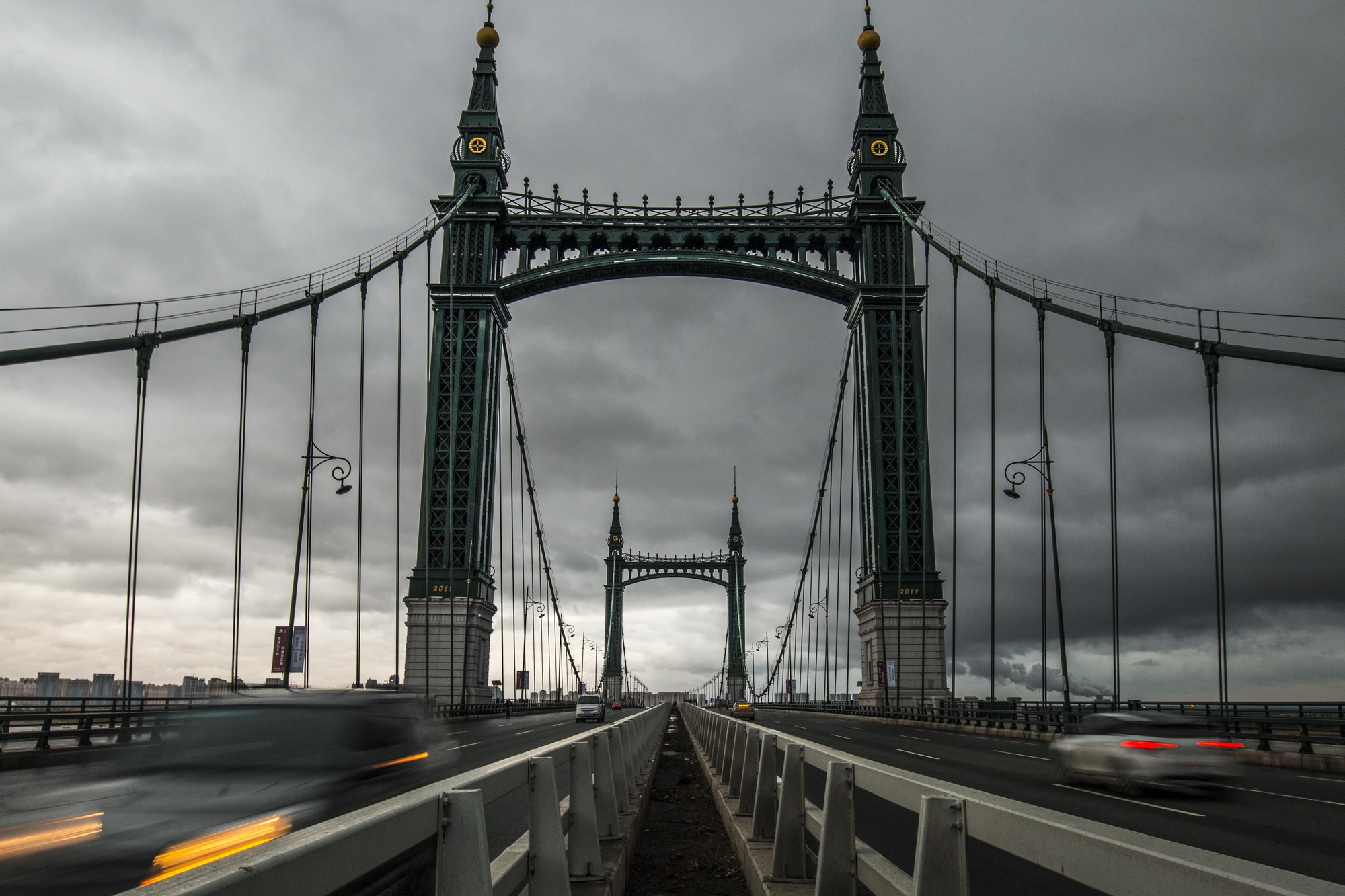
- Coordinates: 45.771744°N 126.519412°E
- Carries: 8 lanes of Harbin 3rd Ring Road
- Crosses: Songhua River
- Locale: Harbin

Characteristics
- Design: Suspension bridge
- Total length: 7,133 metres (23,402 ft)
- Height: 80 metres (260 ft)
- Longest span: 250 metres (820 ft)

History
- Construction start: December 25, 2009
- Construction cost: 1.882 Billion Yuan
- Opened: November 6, 2011

Location
- Interactive map of Yangmingtan Bridge

The Yangmingtan Bridge is a suspension bridge spanning 250 metres (820 ft) over the Songhua River in Harbin, China.

== Collapse ==
A part of the newly inaugurated 15-kilometre-long (9.3 mi) bridge spanning the Songhua River collapsed on August 24, 2012, at 5 am, killing 3 people and injuring 2 others. Problems seem to have occurred due to the weight of trucks using the bridge. The bridge was designed to handle 55 tons, but the combined weight of heavy trucks, amounting to at least 500 tons, caused the bridge to collapse. The collapse was blamed mostly on the construction design and on the project's having been finished too quickly and on traffic controllers having allowed, onto the bridge, vehicles of excessive weight.

== See also ==
List of longest suspension bridge spans
