= Gannan County =

Gannan County 甘南县
- County
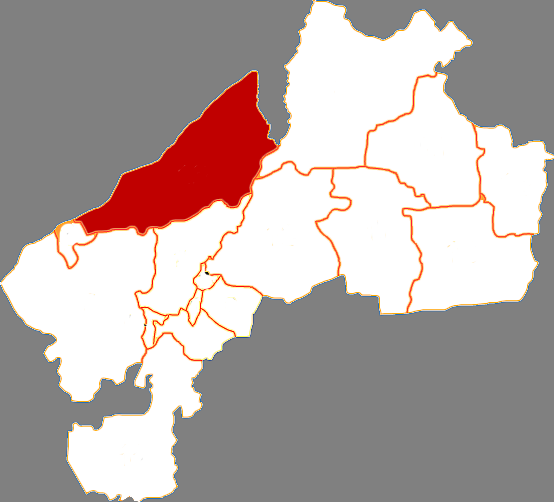

- Location of the seat in Heilongjiang
- Coordinates: 47.922°N 123.507°E
- Country: People's Republic of China
- Province: Heilongjiang
- Prefecture-level city: Qiqihar

Area
  - Total: 4,384 km^{2} (1,693 sq mi)

Population (2010)
  - Total: 368,734
  - Density: 84.11/km^{2} (217.8/sq mi)
- Time zone: UTC+8 (China Standard)
- Website: www.gannan.gov.cn

Gannan (Chinese: 甘南; pinyin: Gānnán) is a county in Qiqihar, in the west of Heilongjiang province, China, about 50 km (31 mi) northwest of the city seat of Qiqihar and bordering Inner Mongolia to the west.

== Administrative divisions ==
Gannan County is divided into 5 towns and 5 townships.

5 towns

- Gannan (甘南镇), Xingshisi (兴十四镇), Pingyang (平阳镇), Dongyang (东阳镇), Jubao (巨宝镇)

5 townships

- Zhangshan (长山乡), Zhongxing (中兴乡), Xinglong (兴隆乡), Baoshan (宝山乡), Chahayang (查哈阳乡)

== Climate ==
Climate data for Gannan, elevation 185 m (607 ft), (1991–2020 normals, extremes 1981–2010)
Month	Jan	Feb	Mar	Apr	May	Jun	Jul	Aug	Sep	Oct	Nov	Dec	Year
Record high °C (°F)	3.2 (37.8)	11.6 (52.9)	22.4 (72.3)	30.0 (86.0)	38.7 (101.7)	41.4 (106.5)	38.7 (101.7)	35.6 (96.1)	35.4 (95.7)	28.8 (83.8)	15.6 (60.1)	5.8 (42.4)	41.4 (106.5)
Mean daily maximum °C (°F)	−11.7 (10.9)	−6.0 (21.2)	2.9 (37.2)	13.5 (56.3)	21.6 (70.9)	26.7 (80.1)	28.1 (82.6)	26.1 (79.0)	20.7 (69.3)	11.4 (52.5)	−1.3 (29.7)	−10.7 (12.7)	10.1 (50.2)
Daily mean °C (°F)	−17.1 (1.2)	−12.3 (9.9)	−3.4 (25.9)	7.0 (44.6)	15.2 (59.4)	20.9 (69.6)	23.2 (73.8)	20.9 (69.6)	14.4 (57.9)	5.3 (41.5)	−6.5 (20.3)	−15.6 (3.9)	4.3 (39.8)
Mean daily minimum °C (°F)	−21.3 (−6.3)	−17.2 (1.0)	−8.9 (16.0)	0.8 (33.4)	8.8 (47.8)	15.3 (59.5)	18.5 (65.3)	16.3 (61.3)	9.0 (48.2)	0.3 (32.5)	−10.7 (12.7)	−19.7 (−3.5)	−0.7 (30.7)
Record low °C (°F)	−34.0 (−29.2)	−32.8 (−27.0)	−23.4 (−10.1)	−10.0 (14.0)	−2.5 (27.5)	2.4 (36.3)	9.5 (49.1)	5.5 (41.9)	−2.1 (28.2)	−16.0 (3.2)	−25.0 (−13.0)	−31.3 (−24.3)	−34.0 (−29.2)
Average precipitation mm (inches)	2.0 (0.08)	2.5 (0.10)	5.3 (0.21)	18.3 (0.72)	34.7 (1.37)	90.8 (3.57)	145.2 (5.72)	118.2 (4.65)	45.8 (1.80)	16.7 (0.66)	5.1 (0.20)	5.1 (0.20)	489.7 (19.28)
Average precipitation days (≥ 0.1 mm)	3.7	2.3	3.1	5.1	8.0	12.0	13.6	11.8	8.4	4.4	3.5	5.8	81.7
Average snowy days	7.0	4.8	6.4	3.0	0.2	0	0	0	0	2.5	6.2	8.9	39
Average relative humidity (%)	63	56	47	42	46	62	73	75	65	55	57	65	59
Mean monthly sunshine hours	206.8	227.3	275.1	271.4	283.9	275.6	264.9	262.0	254.6	234.6	196.4	182.7	2,935.3
Percentage possible sunshine	75	78	74	66	60	58	55	60	68	71	72	70	67
Source: China Meteorological Administration
