= Arun Banner =

Arun Banner 阿荣旗 • ᠠᠷᠤᠨ ᠬᠣᠰᠢᠭᠤ
- Banner
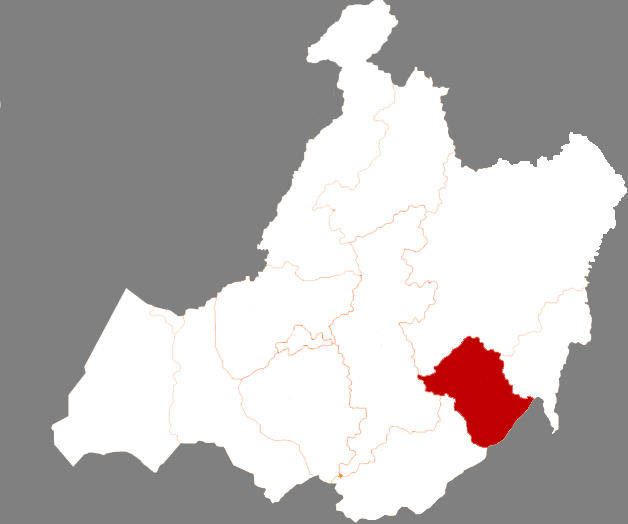
- Location of Arun Banner within Hulunbuir

- Location in Inner Mongolia Arun (China)
- Coordinates: 48°08′N 123°28′E
- Country: China
- Autonomous region: Inner Mongolia
- Prefecture-level city: Hulunbuir
- Banner seat: Naji Town

Area
  - Total: 13,600 km^{2} (5,300 sq mi)
- Elevation: 217 m (712 ft)

Population (2020)
  - Total: 257,815
  - Density: 19.0/km^{2} (49.1/sq mi)
- Time zone: UTC+8 (China Standard)
- Postal code: 162750
- Website: www.arq.gov.cn

Arun Banner

Chinese name
- Simplified Chinese: 阿荣旗
- Traditional Chinese: 阿榮旗
Transcriptions
Standard Mandarin
- Hanyu Pinyin: Āróng Qí

Korean name
- Hangul: 아영기
- Hanja: 阿榮旗
Transcriptions
- Revised Romanization: Ayeonggi
- McCune–Reischauer: Ayŏnggi

Mongolian name
- Mongolian Cyrillic: Арун хошуу
- Mongolian script: ᠠᠷᠤᠨ ᠬᠣᠰᠢᠭᠤ
Transcriptions
- SASM/GNC: Arun qosiɣu

Evenki name
- Evenki: Arong Gosa

Arun Banner (Mongolian: ᠠᠷᠤᠨ ᠬᠣᠰᠢᠭᠤ; Chinese: 阿荣旗) is a banner of northeastern Inner Mongolia, China, bordering Heilongjiang province to the south and east. It is under the administration of Hulunbuir City, and is 92 kilometres (57 mi) north-northwest of the city of Qiqihar in Heilongjiang province.

== Administrative divisions ==
Arun Banner is made up of 8 towns and 4 ethnic townships.

Name	Simplified Chinese	Hanyu Pinyin	Mongolian (Hudum Script)	Mongolian (Cyrillic)	Administrative division code	Notes
Towns
Naji Town	那吉镇	Nàjí Zhèn	ᠨᠠᠵᠢ ᠪᠠᠯᠭᠠᠰᠤ	Нож балгас	150721100	
Liuhe Town	六合镇	Liùhé Zhèn	ᠯᠢᠦ ᠾᠧ ᠪᠠᠯᠭᠠᠰᠤ	Лиу ге балгас	150721101	
Yadong Town	亚东镇	Yàdōng Zhèn	ᠶᠠᠳ᠋ᠦ᠋ᠩ ᠪᠠᠯᠭᠠᠰᠤ	Ядон балгас	150721102	
Horqi Town	霍尔奇镇	Huò'ěrqí Zhèn	ᠬᠣᠷᠴᠢ ᠪᠠᠯᠭᠠᠰᠤ	Хорч балгас	150721103	
Xiangyangyu Town	向阳峪镇	Xiàngyángyù Zhèn	ᠰᠢᠶᠠᠩ ᠶᠠᠩ ᠢᠦᠢ ᠪᠠᠯᠭᠠᠰᠤ	Шиян ян юй балгас	150721104	
Sanchahe Town	三岔河镇	Sānchàhé Zhèn	ᠰᠠᠨ ᠴᠠ ᠾᠧ ᠪᠠᠯᠭᠠᠰᠤ	Сан ца ге балгас	150721105	
Fuxing Town	复兴镇	Fùxīng Zhèn	ᠹᠦᠰᠢᠩ ᠪᠠᠯᠭᠠᠰᠤ	Фүшин балгас	150721106	
Xing'an Town	兴安镇	Xīng'ān Zhèn	ᠰᠢᠩ ᠠᠨ ᠪᠠᠯᠭᠠᠰᠤ	Шин аан балгас	150721108	
Ethnic townships
Deliqir Evenk Ethnic Township	得力其尔鄂温克民族乡	Délìqí'ěr Èwēnkè Mínzúxiāng	ᠳ᠋ᠧᠯᠴᠢᠷ ᠡᠸᠡᠩᠬᠢ ᠦᠨᠳᠦᠰᠦᠲᠡᠨ ᠦ ᠰᠢᠶᠠᠩ	Телчир эвэнк үндэстэний шиян	150721200	(Evenki); Delkir Ewengki Aimanni Nēr
Qalbaq Evenk Ethnic Township	查巴奇鄂温克民族乡	Chábāqí Èwēnkè Mínzúxiāng	ᠴᠠᠯᠪᠠᠴᠢ ᠡᠸᠡᠩᠬᠢ ᠦᠨᠳᠦᠰᠦᠲᠡᠨ ᠦ ᠰᠢᠶᠠᠩ	Цлавч эвэнк үндэстэний шиян	150721201	(Evenki); Saalbasi Ewengki Aimanni Nēr
Yinhe Daur Evenk Ethnic Township	音河达斡尔鄂温克民族乡	Yīnhé Dáwò'ěr Èwēnkè Mínzúxiāng	ᠶᠢᠨᠾᠧ ᠳᠠᠭᠤᠷ ᠡᠸᠡᠩᠬᠢ ᠦᠨᠳᠦᠰᠦᠲᠡᠨ ᠦ ᠰᠢᠶᠠᠩ	Инге дагуур эвэнк үндэстэний шиян	150721202	
Xinfa Korean Ethnic Township (Sinbal Korean Ethnic Township)	新发朝鲜民族乡	Xīnfā Cháoxiǎn Mínzúxiāng	ᠰᠢᠨᠹᠠ ᠰᠣᠯᠣᠩᠭᠣᠰ ᠦᠨᠳᠦᠰᠦᠲᠡᠨ ᠦ ᠰᠢᠶᠠᠩ	Шинфа Солонгос үндэстэний шиян	150721203	(Korean) 신발조선족향; Sinbal Chosŏnjokhyang

Other: Arun Banner Forestry and Grassland Bureau (阿荣旗林业和草原局)

== Climate ==
Climate data for Arun Banner, elevation 236 m (774 ft), (1991–2020 normals, extremes 1981–2010)
Month	Jan	Feb	Mar	Apr	May	Jun	Jul	Aug	Sep	Oct	Nov	Dec	Year
Record high °C (°F)	4.3 (39.7)	10.3 (50.5)	21.2 (70.2)	30.0 (86.0)	38.4 (101.1)	40.6 (105.1)	38.5 (101.3)	34.0 (93.2)	35.9 (96.6)	29.0 (84.2)	16.0 (60.8)	6.0 (42.8)	40.6 (105.1)
Mean daily maximum °C (°F)	−11.6 (11.1)	−6.1 (21.0)	2.7 (36.9)	13.1 (55.6)	21.3 (70.3)	26.4 (79.5)	28.0 (82.4)	25.9 (78.6)	20.4 (68.7)	11.1 (52.0)	−1.5 (29.3)	−10.7 (12.7)	9.9 (49.8)
Daily mean °C (°F)	−17.7 (0.1)	−13.0 (8.6)	−4.0 (24.8)	6.4 (43.5)	14.6 (58.3)	20.3 (68.5)	22.7 (72.9)	20.3 (68.5)	13.6 (56.5)	4.5 (40.1)	−7.4 (18.7)	−16.3 (2.7)	3.7 (38.6)
Mean daily minimum °C (°F)	−22.1 (−7.8)	−18.3 (−0.9)	−10.0 (14.0)	−0.2 (31.6)	7.6 (45.7)	14.2 (57.6)	17.6 (63.7)	15.3 (59.5)	7.8 (46.0)	−0.9 (30.4)	−12.0 (10.4)	−20.6 (−5.1)	−1.8 (28.8)
Record low °C (°F)	−37.2 (−35.0)	−35.5 (−31.9)	−23.6 (−10.5)	−12.0 (10.4)	−4.5 (23.9)	2.7 (36.9)	7.9 (46.2)	3.0 (37.4)	−5.9 (21.4)	−16.9 (1.6)	−27.4 (−17.3)	−33.9 (−29.0)	−37.2 (−35.0)
Average precipitation mm (inches)	2.1 (0.08)	2.7 (0.11)	6.2 (0.24)	20.4 (0.80)	36.6 (1.44)	92.1 (3.63)	147.2 (5.80)	117.5 (4.63)	50.7 (2.00)	19.6 (0.77)	5.5 (0.22)	4.9 (0.19)	505.5 (19.91)
Average precipitation days (≥ 0.1 mm)	3.5	2.5	3.5	5.4	8.4	12.3	13.8	12.8	8.7	5.1	4.0	5.3	85.3
Average snowy days	5.8	4.3	4.7	3.0	0.2	0	0	0	0	2.5	5.6	8.0	34.1
Average relative humidity (%)	63	57	48	43	45	61	71	74	65	55	59	65	59
Mean monthly sunshine hours	163.0	188.0	236.2	230.9	246.5	241.2	238.0	230.6	224.8	201.0	159.8	143.9	2,503.9
Percentage possible sunshine	59	65	64	56	52	50	50	53	60	61	58	56	57
Source: China Meteorological Administration
