= Mongolian language =

Official language of Mongolia

Mongolian
- Монгол хэл; ᠮᠣᠩᠭᠣᠯ ᠬᠡᠯᠡ; Mongol khel
- Pronunciation: [ˈmɔ̙́ɴɢɔ̙̆ɬ xe̘ɬ]
- Native to: Mongolian Plateau
- Region: Mongolia, parts of Northeast China, Northwestern China, southern Siberia, and Issyk-Kul Region in Kyrgyzstan
- Ethnicity: Mongols, Buryats, Oirats
- Native speakers: 5 million (2020–2022)
- Language family: Serbi–Mongolic: Mongolic; Central Mongolic; Buryat–Mongolian; Mongolian
- Early forms: Proto-Mongolic: Middle Mongolian; Classical Mongolian
- Standard forms: Khalkha (Mongolia); Chakhar (China); Oirat; Buryat
- Dialects: Standard Mongolian; Oirat; Peripheral
- Writing system: Mongolian script (in China and Mongolia); Mongolian Cyrillic (in Mongolia and Russia); Mongolian Braille; ʼPhags-pa (historical, among others)

Official status
- Official language in: Mongolia; China (Inner Mongolia, Xinjiang, Qinghai); Russia (Kalmykia, as Kalmyk, Buryatia, as Buryat)
- Regulated by: Mongolia: State Language Council; China: Council for Language and Literature Work

Language codes
- ISO 639-1: mn
- ISO 639-2: mon
- ISO 639-3: mon – inclusive code Individual codes: khk – Khalkha Mongolian mvf – Peripheral Mongolian (part)
- Glottolog: mong1331
- Linguasphere: part
- Area where Mongolian is spoken

Mongolian (Note: Mongolian Cyrillic: монгол хэл, mongol khel; Traditional Mongolian script: ᠮᠣᠩᠭᠣᠯ ᠬᠡᠯᠡ, moŋɣol kele; Image: ) is the principal language of the Mongolic language family that originated in the Mongolian Plateau. It is spoken by ethnic Mongols and other closely related Mongolic peoples who are native to modern Mongolia and surrounding parts of East, Central and North Asia. Mongolian is the official language of Mongolia and the Chinese autonomous region of Inner Mongolia and is also a recognized language of Xinjiang and Qinghai in China and Buryatia in Russia.

The number of speakers across all its dialects may be 5–6 million, including the vast majority of the residents of Mongolia and many of the ethnic Mongol residents of the Inner Mongolia of China. In Mongolia, Khalkha Mongolian is predominant, and is currently written in both Cyrillic and the traditional Mongolian script. In Inner Mongolia, it is dialectally more diverse and written in the traditional Mongolian script. However, Mongols in both countries often use the Latin script for convenience on the Internet.

In the discussion of grammar to follow, the variety of Mongolian treated is the standard written Khalkha formalized in the writing conventions and in grammar as taught in schools, but much of it is also valid for vernacular (spoken) Khalkha and other Mongolian dialects, especially Chakhar Mongolian.

Some classify several other Mongolic languages like Buryat and Oirat as varieties of Mongolian, but this classification is not in line with the current international standard.

Mongolian is a language with vowel harmony and a complex syllabic structure compared to other Mongolic languages, allowing clusters of up to three consonants syllable-finally. It is a typical agglutinative language that relies on suffix chains in the verbal and nominal domains. While there is a basic word order, subject–object–verb, ordering among noun phrases is relatively free, as grammatical roles are indicated by a system of about eight grammatical cases. There are five voices. Verbs are marked for voice, aspect, tense and epistemic modality/evidentiality. In sentence linking, a special role is played by converbs.

Modern Mongolian evolved from Middle Mongol, the language spoken in the Mongol Empire of the 13th and 14th centuries. In the transition, a major shift in the vowel-harmony paradigm occurred, long vowels developed, the case system changed slightly, and the verbal system was restructured. Mongolian is related to the extinct Khitan language. It was believed that Mongolian was related to Turkic, Tungusic, Korean and Japonic languages but this view is now seen as obsolete by a majority of comparative linguists. These languages have been grouped under the Altaic language family and contrasted with the Mainland Southeast Asia linguistic area. However, instead of a common genetic origin, Clauson, Doerfer, and Shcherbak proposed that Turkic, Mongolic and Tungusic languages form a language Sprachbund, rather than common origin. Mongolian literature is well attested in written form from the 13th century but has earlier Mongolic precursors in the literature of the Khitan and other Xianbei peoples. The Bugut inscription dated to 584 CE and the Inscription of Hüis Tolgoi dated to 604–620 CE appear to be the oldest substantial Mongolic or Para-Mongolic texts discovered.

== Name ==
Writers such as Owen Lattimore referred to Mongolian as "the Mongol language". In the Mongolian language itself, the name for the language is "Монгол хэл" [ˈmɔɴɢəɮ xiɮ]. "Монгол" (Mongol) is the endonym of the language used by the speakers themselves, and "хэл" (Khel) means "tongue" or "language".

"Монгол" may originate from the Middle Chinese term "Mengwu", or the Old Mongolic term for "brave" or "fearless", "Mong" (ᠮᠣᠩ or Монг). "хэл" originates from the Old Mongolic term for "language", "*kelen".

== History ==
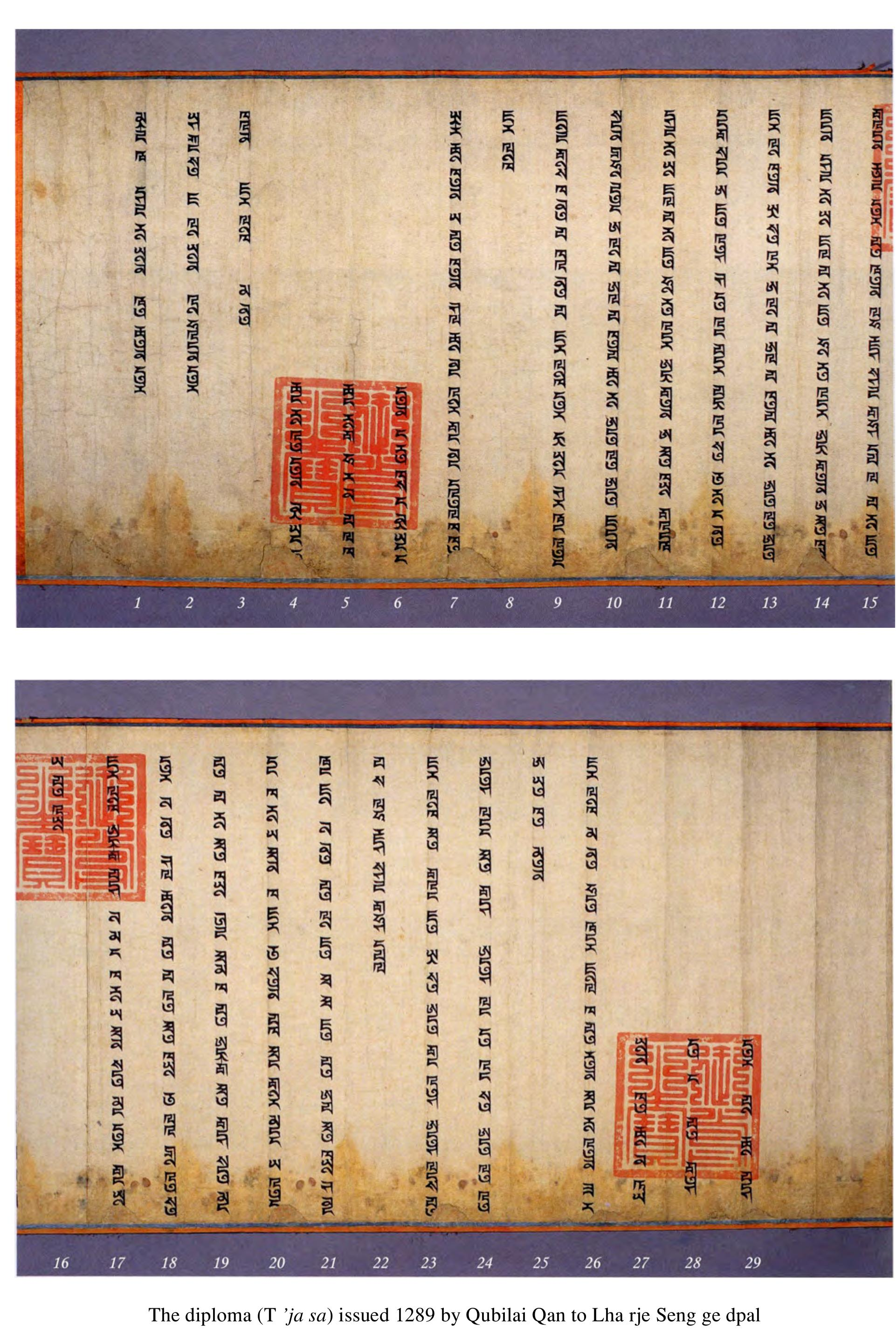
Edict of Kublai Khan (1289). Only the 'Phags-pa script retains the complete Middle Mongol vowel system.

The earliest surviving Mongolian text may be the Stele of Yisüngge, a report on sports composed in Mongolian script on stone, which is most often dated at 1224 or 1225. The Mongolian-Armenian wordlist of 55 words compiled by Kirakos of Gandzak (13th century) is the first manuscript evidence of the language. From the 13th to the 15th centuries, Mongolian language texts were written in four scripts (not counting some vocabulary written in Western scripts): Uyghur Mongolian (UM) script (an adaptation of the Uyghur alphabet ), 'Phags-pa script (Ph) (used in decrees), Chinese (SM) (The Secret History of the Mongols), and Arabic (AM) (used in dictionaries). While they are the earliest texts available, these texts have come to be called "Middle Mongol" in scholarly practice. The documents in UM script show some distinct linguistic characteristics and are therefore often distinguished by terming their language "Preclassical Mongolian".

The Yuan dynasty referred to the Mongolian language in Chinese as "Guoyu" (Chinese: 國語), which means "National language", a term also used by other non-Han dynasties to refer to their languages such as the Manchu language during the Qing dynasty, the Jurchen language during the Jin dynasty (1115–1234), the Khitan language during the Liao dynasty, and the Xianbei language during the Northern Wei period.

The next distinct period is Classical Mongolian, which is dated from the 17th to the 19th century. This is a written language with a high degree of standardization in orthography and syntax that sets it quite apart from the subsequent Modern Mongolian. The most notable documents in this language are the Mongolian Kangyur and Tengyur as well as several chronicles. In 1686, the Soyombo alphabet (Buddhist texts) was created, giving distinctive evidence on early classical Mongolian phonological peculiarities.

== Geographic distribution ==
Mongolian is the official national language of Mongolia, where it is spoken (but not always written) by nearly 3.6 million people (2014 estimate), and the official provincial language (both spoken and written forms) of Inner Mongolia, where there are at least 4.1 million ethnic Mongols. Across the whole of China, the language is spoken by roughly half of the country's 5.8 million ethnic Mongols (2005 estimate). In Inner Mongolia specifically, about 2.1 million people speak Mongolian. The use of Mongolian in Inner Mongolia has witnessed periods of decline and revival over the last few hundred years. The language experienced a decline during the late Qing period, a revival between 1947 and 1965, a second decline between 1966 and 1976, a second revival between 1977 and 1992, and a third decline between 1995 and 2012. However, in spite of the decline of the Mongolian language in some of Inner Mongolia's urban areas and educational spheres, the ethnic identity of the urbanized Chinese-speaking Mongols is most likely going to survive due to the presence of urban ethnic communities. The multilingual situation in Inner Mongolia does not appear to obstruct efforts by ethnic Mongols to preserve their language. Although an unknown number of Mongols in China, such as the Tumets, may have completely or partially lost the ability to speak their language, they are still registered as ethnic Mongols and continue to identify themselves as ethnic Mongols. The children of inter-ethnic Mongol-Chinese marriages also claim to be and are registered as ethnic Mongols so they can benefit from the preferential policies for minorities in education, healthcare, family planning, school admissions, the hiring and promotion, the financing and taxation of businesses, and regional infrastructural support given to ethnic minorities in China. In 2020, the Chinese government required three subjects—language and literature, politics, and history—to be taught in Mandarin in Mongolian-language primary and secondary schools in the Inner Mongolia since September, which caused widespread protests among ethnic Mongol communities. These protests were quickly suppressed by the Chinese government. Mandarin has been deemed the only language of instruction for all subjects as of September 2023.

== Classification and varieties ==
Modern Mongolian's place on the chronological tree of Mongolic languages

Mongolian belongs to the Mongolic languages. The delimitation of the Mongolian language within Mongolic is a much disputed theoretical problem, one whose resolution is impeded by the fact that existing data for the major varieties is not easily arrangeable according to a common set of linguistic criteria. Such data might account for the historical development of the Mongolian dialect continuum, as well as for its sociolinguistic qualities. Though phonological and lexical studies are comparatively well developed, the basis has yet to be laid for a comparative morphosyntactic study, for example between such highly diverse varieties as Khalkha and Khorchin.

In Juha Janhunen's book titled Mongolian, he groups the Mongolic language family into four distinct linguistic branches:

- the Dagur branch, made up of just the Dagur language, which is spoken in the northeast area of Manchuria in China, specifically in Morin Dawa Daur Autonomous Banner of Hulunbuir, and in Meilisi Daur District of Qiqihar, Heilongjiang;
- the Moghol branch, made up of just the Moghol language, spoken in Afghanistan, and is possibly extinct;
- the Shirongolic (or Southern Mongolic) branch, made up of roughly seven languages, which are spoken in the Amdo region of Tibet;
- the Common Mongolic (or Central Mongolic) branch, made up of roughly six language varieties, to which Mongolian proper belongs.

The Common Mongolic branch is grouped in the following way:

- Khalkha (Khalkh) is spoken in Mongolia, but some dialects (e.g. Cahar) are also spoken in the Inner Mongolia region of China.
- Khorchin (Khorchin) is spoken to the east in eastern Inner Mongolia and Manchuria.
- Ordos is spoken to the south, in Ordos City in Inner Mongolia.
- Oirat, is spoken to the west, in Dzungaria.
- Khamnigan (Khamnigan) is spoken in northeast Mongolia and in northwest of Manchuria.
- Buryat (Buriad) is spoken to the north, in the Republic of Buryatia of Russia, as well as in the Barga region of Hulun Buir League in Inner Mongolia.

There is no disagreement that the Khalkha dialect of the Mongolian state is Mongolian. However, the status of certain varieties in the Common Mongolic group—whether they are languages distinct from Mongolian or just dialects of it—is disputed. There are at least three such varieties: Oirat (including the Kalmyk variety) and Buryat, both of which are spoken in Russia, Mongolia, and China; and Ordos, spoken around Inner Mongolia's Ordos City. The influential classification of Sanžeev (1953) proposed a "Mongolian language" consisting of just the three dialects Khalkha, Chakhar, and Ordos, with Buryat and Oirat judged to be independent languages. On the other hand, Luvsanvandan (1959) proposed a much broader "Mongolian language" consisting of a Central dialect (Khalkha, Chakhar, Ordos), an Eastern dialect (Kharchin, Khorchin), a Western dialect (Oirat, Kalmyk), and a Northern dialect (consisting of two Buryat varieties). Additionally, the Language Policy in the People's Republic of China: Theory and Practice Since 1949, states that Mongolian can be classified into four dialects: the Khalkha dialect in the middle, the Horcin-Haracin dialect in the East, Oriat-Hilimag in the west, and Bargu–Buriyad in the north.

Some Western scholars propose that the relatively well researched Ordos variety is an independent language due to its conservative syllable structure and phoneme inventory. While the placement of a variety like Alasha, which is under the cultural influence of Inner Mongolia but historically tied to Oirat, and of other border varieties like Darkhad would very likely remain problematic in any classification, the central problem remains the question of how to classify Chakhar, Khalkha, and Khorchin in relation to each other and in relation to Buryat and Oirat. The split of [tʃ] into [tʃ] before *i and [ts] before all other reconstructed vowels, which is found in Mongolia but not in Inner Mongolia, is often cited as a fundamental distinction, for example Proto-Mongolic *tʃil, Khalkha /tʃiɮ/, Chakhar /tʃil/ 'year' versus Proto-Mongolic *tʃøhelen, Khalkha /tsoːɮəŋ/, Chakhar /tʃoːləŋ/ 'few'. On the other hand, the split between the past tense verbal suffixes -/sŋ/ in the Central varieties v. -/dʒɛː/ in the Eastern varieties is usually seen as a merely stochastic difference.

In Inner Mongolia, official language policy divides the Mongolian language into three dialects: Standard Mongolian of Inner Mongolia, Oirat, and Barghu-Buryat. The Standard Mongolian of Inner Mongolia is said to consist of Chakhar, Ordos, Baarin, Khorchin, Kharchin, and Alasha. The authorities have synthesized a literary standard for Mongolian in whose grammar is said to be based on the Standard Mongolian of Inner Mongolia and whose pronunciation is based on the Chakhar dialect as spoken in the Plain Blue Banner. Dialectologically, however, western Mongolian dialects in Inner Mongolia are closer to Khalkha than they are to eastern Mongolian dialects in Inner Mongolia: e.g. Chakhar is closer to Khalkha than to Khorchin.

=== List of dialects ===
Juha Janhunen (2003: 179) lists the following Mongol dialects, most of which are spoken in Inner Mongolia.

- Tongliao group
  - Horchin
  - Jasagtu
  - Jarut
  - Jalait
  - Dörbet
  - Gorlos
- Juu Uda group
  - Aru Horchin
  - Baarin
  - Ongniut
  - Naiman
  - Aohan
- Josotu group
  - Harachin
  - Tümet
- Ulan cab group
  - Cahar
  - Urat
  - Darhan
  - Muumingan
  - Dörben Küüket
  - Keshigten
- Shilingol group
  - Üdzümüchin
  - Huuchit
  - Abaga
  - Abaganar
  - Sönit
- Outer Mongolian group
  - Halh
  - Hotogoit
  - Darhad
  - Congol
  - Sartul
  - Dariganga

=== Standard varieties ===
There are two standard varieties of Mongolian.

==== Mongolia ====
Standard Mongolian in the state of Mongolia is based on the northern Khalkha Mongolian dialects, which include the dialect of Ulaanbaatar, and is written in the Mongolian Cyrillic script.

==== China ====
Standard Mongolian in Inner Mongolia is based on the Chakhar Mongolian of the Khalkha dialect group, spoken in the Plain Blue Banner, Inner Mongolia, and is written in the traditional Mongolian script.

The number of Mongolian speakers in China is still larger than in the state of Mongolia, where the majority of Mongolians in China speak one of the Khorchin dialects, or rather more than two million of them speak the Khorchin dialect itself as their mother tongue, so that the Khorchin dialect group has about as many speakers as the Khalkha dialect group in the State of Mongolia. Nevertheless, the Chakhar dialect, which today has only about 100,000 native speakers and belongs to the Khalkha dialect group, serves as the basis for standard Mongolian in China.

==== Differences ====
The characteristic differences in the pronunciation of the two standard varieties include the umlauts in Inner Mongolia and the palatalized consonants in Mongolia (see below) as well as the splitting of the Middle Mongol affricates *tʃ (ᠴ č) and *dʒ (ᠵ ǰ) into ts (ц c) and dz (з z) versus tʃ (ч č) and dʒ (ж ž) in Mongolia:

Middle Mongol	Inner Mongolia	Mongolia	Meaning
*tʃisu ᠴᠢᠰᠤ čisu	[tʃʊs] ᠴᠢᠰᠤ čisu	[tsʊs] цус cus	blood
*dʒɑm ᠵᠠᠮ ǰam	[dʒɑm] ᠵᠠᠮ ǰam	[dzɑm] зам zam	street
*otʃixu ᠣᠴᠢᠬᠤ očiqu	[ɔtʃɪx] ᠣᠴᠢᠬᠤ očiqu	[ɔtʃɪx] очих očix	to go
*dʒime ᠵᠢᠮ᠎ᠡ ǰim‑e	[dʒim] ᠵᠢᠮ᠎ᠡ ǰim‑e	[dʒim] жим žim	path

Aside from these differences in pronunciation, there are also differences in vocabulary and language use: in the state of Mongolia more loanwords from Russian are being used, while in Inner Mongolia more loanwords from Chinese have been adopted.

== Phonology ==
Mongolians speaking Khalkh
Mongolians in 2004 speaking Khalkh, the dominant dialect of Mongolian. Recorded in Tavan Har, Mongolia

The following description is based primarily on the Khalkha dialect as spoken in Ulaanbaatar, Mongolia's capital. The phonologies of other varieties such as Ordos, Khorchin, and even Chakhar, differ considerably.

=== Vowels ===
The standard language has seven monophthong vowel phonemes. They are aligned into three vowel harmony groups by a parameter called ATR (advanced tongue root); the groups are −ATR, +ATR, and neutral. This alignment seems to have superseded an alignment according to oral backness. However, some scholars still describe Mongolian as being characterized by a distinction between front vowels and back vowels, and the front vowel spellings 'ö' and 'ü' are still often used in the West to indicate two vowels which were historically front. The Mongolian vowel system also has rounding harmony.

Length is phonemic for vowels, and except short [e], which has merged into short [i], at least in Ulaanbaatar dialect, each of the other six phonemes occurs both short and long. Phonetically, short /o/ has become centralised to the central vowel [ɵ].

In the following table, the seven vowel phonemes, with their length variants, are arranged and described phonetically. The vowels in the Mongolian Cyrillic alphabet are:

Mongolian Cyrillic	IPA	Romanization
а, аа	[a, aː]	a, aa
и, ий/ы	[i, iː]	i, ii
о, оо	[ɔ, ɔː]	o, oo
ө, өө	[ɵ, oː]	ö, öö
у, уу	[ʊ, ʊː]	u, uu
ү, үү	[u, uː]	ü, üü
э, ээ	[i, eː]	e, ee

	Front		Central		Back	
	Short	Long	Short	Long	Short	Long
Close	i	iː			u	uː
Near-Close					ʊ	ʊː
Close-Mid		eː	ɵ			oː
Open-mid					ɔ	ɔː
Open			a	aː		

Khalkha also has four diphthongs: historically /ui, ʊi, ɔi, ai/ but are pronounced more like [ʉe̯, ʊe̯, ɞe̯, æe̯]; e.g. ой in нохой (nokhoi) [nɜˈχɞe̯] 'dog', ай in далай (dalai) [tɐˈɮæe̯] 'sea', уй in уйлах (uilakh) [ˈʊe̯ɮɐχ] 'to cry', and үй in үйлдвэр (üildver) [ˈʉe̯ɬtw̜ɘr] 'factory'. There are three additional rising diphthongs /ia/ (иа), /ʊa/ (уа) /ei/ (эй); e.g., иа in амиараа (amiaraa) [æmʲæˈra] 'individually', уа in хуаран (khuaran) [ˈχʷarɐɴ] 'barracks', and эй in хэрэгтэй (kheregtei) [xirɪxˈtʰe] 'necessary'.

==== Allophones ====
This table below lists vowel allophones (short vowels allophones in non-initial positions are used interchangeably with schwa):

Short	Initial positions	[a]	[e]	[i]	[ɔ]	[o]	[ʊ]	[u]
Short	Non-initial positions	[ă]	[ĕ]	[ĭ]	[ɔ̆]	[ŏ]	[ʊ̆]	[ŭ]
Short	Non-initial positions	[ə]						
Long	Initial positions	[aː]	[eː]	[iː]	[ɔː]	[oː]	[ʊː]	[uː]
Long	Non-initial positions	[a]	[e]	[i]	[ɔ]	[o]	[ʊ]	[u]

==== ATR harmony ====
Vowel harmony in Mongolian

Mongolian divides vowels into three groups in a system of vowel harmony:

	+ATR ("front")	Neutral	−ATR ("back")
IPA	/u, e, o/	/i/	/ʊ, a, ɔ/
Cyrillic	ү, э, ө	и + ы + й	у, а, о
Romanization	ü, e, ö	i	u, a, o

For historical reasons, these have been traditionally labeled as "front" vowels and "back" vowels, as /o/ and /u/ developed from /ø/ and /y/, while /ɔ/ and /ʊ/ developed from /o/ and /u/ in Middle Mongolian. Indeed, in Mongolian romanizations, the vowels /o/ and /u/ are often conventionally rendered as ⟨ö⟩ and ⟨ü⟩, while the vowels /ɔ/ and /ʊ/ are expressed as ⟨o⟩ and ⟨u⟩. However, for modern Mongolian phonology, it is more appropriate to instead characterize the two vowel-harmony groups by the dimension of tongue root position. There is also one neutral vowel, /i/, not belonging to either group.

All the vowels in a noncompound word, including all its suffixes, must belong to the same group. If the first vowel is −ATR, then every vowel of the word must be either /i/ or a −ATR vowel. Likewise, if the first vowel is a +ATR vowel, then every vowel of the word must be either /i/ or a +ATR vowel. In the case of suffixes, which must change their vowels to conform to different words, two patterns predominate. Some suffixes contain an archiphoneme /A/ that can be realized as /a, ɔ, e, o/; e.g.

- өрх (örkh) /orx/ 'household' + -Ar (instrumental) → өрхөөр (örkhöör) /orxor/ 'by a household'
- харуул (kharuul) /xarʊɮ/ 'sentry' + -Ar (instrumental) → харуул (Kharuulaar) /xarʊɮar/ 'by a sentry'

Other suffixes can occur in /U/ being realized as /ʊ, u/, in which case all −ATR vowels lead to /ʊ/ and all +ATR vowels lead to /u/; e.g.

- ав (av) /aw/ 'to take' + -Uɮ (causative) →авуул (avuul) /awʊɮ/

If the only vowel in the word stem is /i/, the suffixes will use the +ATR suffix forms.

==== Rounding harmony ====
Mongolian also has rounding harmony, which does not apply to close vowels. If a stem contains /o/ (or /ɔ/), a suffix that is specified for an open vowel will have [o] (or [ɔ], respectively) as well. However, this process is blocked by the presence of /u/ (or /ʊ/) and /ei/; e.g. /ɔr-ɮɔ/ 'came in', but /ɔr-ʊɮ-ɮa/ 'inserted'.

==== Vowel length ====
The pronunciation of long and short vowels depends on the syllable's position in the word. In word-initial syllables, there is a phonemic contrast in vowel length. A long vowel has about 208% the length of a short vowel. In word-medial and word-final syllables, formerly long vowels are now only 127% as long as short vowels in initial syllables, but they are still distinct from initial-syllable short vowels. Short vowels in noninitial syllables differ from short vowels in initial syllables by being only 71% as long and by being centralized in articulation. As they are nonphonemic, their position is determined according to phonotactic requirements.

=== Consonants ===
The following table lists the consonants of Khalkha Mongolian. The consonants enclosed in parentheses occur only in loanwords. The occurrence of palatalized consonant phonemes, except /tʃ/ /tʃʰ/ /ʃ/ /j/, is restricted to words with [−ATR] vowels. Also, phonemic contrast between the /g/ and /ɢ/ is restricted to the final position of [-ATR] morphemes.

		Labial		Dental		Velar		Uvular
		plain	pal.	plain	pal.	plain	pal.	plain
Nasal		m	mʲ	n	nʲ	ŋ		
Plosive	unaspirated	p	pʲ	t	tʲ	ɡ	ɡʲ	ɢ
Plosive	aspirated	(pʰ)	(pʲʰ)	tʰ	tʲʰ	(kʰ)	(kʲʰ)	
Affricate	unaspirated			ts	tʃ			
Affricate	aspirated			tsʰ	tʃʰ			
Fricative	median	(f)		s	ʃ	x	xʲ	
Fricative	lateral			ɮ	ɮʲ			
Trill				r	rʲ			
Approximant		w̜	w̜ʲ		j			

A rare feature among the world's languages, Mongolian has neither a voiced lateral approximant, such as [l], nor the voiceless velar plosive [k], though /g/ is usually pronounced as unvoiced; instead, it has a voiced alveolar lateral fricative, /ɮ/, which is often realized as voiceless [ɬ]. In word-final position, /n/ (if not followed by a vowel in historical forms) is realized as [ŋ]. Aspirated consonants are preaspirated in medial and word-final contexts, devoicing preceding consonants and vowels. Devoiced short vowels are often deleted.

=== Syllable structure and phonotactics ===
The maximal syllable is CVVCCC, where the last C is a word-final suffix. A single short vowel rarely appears in syllable-final position. If a word was monosyllabic historically, *CV has become CVV. In native words, the following consonants do not occur word-initially: /w̜/, /ɮ/, /r/, /w̜ʲ/, /ɮʲ/, /rʲ/, /tʰʲ/, and /tʲ/. [ŋ] is restricted to codas (else it becomes [n]), and /p/ and /pʲ/ do not occur in codas for historical reasons. For two-consonant clusters, the following restrictions obtain:

- a palatalized consonant can be preceded only by another palatalized consonant or sometimes by /ɢ/ and /ʃ/
- /ŋ/ may precede only /ʃ, x, ɡ, ɡʲ/ and /ɢ/
- /j/ does not seem to appear in second position
- /p/ and /pʲ/ do not occur as first consonant and as second consonant only if preceded by /m/ or /ɮ/ or their palatalized counterparts.

Clusters that do not conform to these restrictions will be broken up by an epenthetic nonphonemic vowel in a syllabification that takes place from right to left. For instance, хоёр (khoyor) 'two', ажил (ajil) 'work', and саармаг (saarmag) 'neutral' are, phonemically, /xɔjr/, /atʃɮ/, and /saːrmɡ/ respectively. In such cases, an epenthetic vowel is inserted to prevent disallowed consonant clusters. Thus, in the examples given above, the words are phonetically [ˈxɔjɔ̆r], [ˈatʃĭɮ], and [ˈsaːrmăɢ]. The phonetic form of the epenthetic vowel follows from vowel harmony triggered by the vowel in the preceding syllable. Usually it is a centralized version of the same sound, with the following exceptions: preceding /u/ produces [e]; /i/ will be ignored if there is a nonneutral vowel earlier in the word; and a postalveolar or palatalized consonant will be followed by an epenthetic [i], as in [ˈatʃĭɮ].

=== Stress ===
Stress in Mongolian is non-phonemic (does not distinguish different meanings) and is thus considered to depend entirely on syllable structure. But scholarly opinions on stress placement diverge sharply. Most native linguists, regardless of which dialect they speak, claim that stress falls on the first syllable. Between 1941 and 1975, several Western scholars proposed that the leftmost heavy syllable gets the stress. Yet other positions were taken in works published between 1835 and 1915.

Walker (1997) proposes that stress falls on the rightmost heavy syllable unless this syllable is word-final:

HˈHLL	байгуулагдах (baiguulagdakh)	[pæ.ˈɢʊ.ɮəɢ.təx]	'to be organized'
LHˈHL	хөндийрүүлэн (khöndiirüülen)	[xɵn.ti.ˈɾu.ɮəŋ]	'separating' (adverbial)
LHHˈHL	Улаанбаатрынхан (ulaanbaatriinkhan)	[ʊ.ɮan.paːtʰ.ˈrin.xəŋ]	'the residents of Ulaanbaatar'
HˈHH	ууртайгаар (uurtaigaar)	[ʊːr.ˈtʰæ.ɢar]	'angrily'
ˈHLH	уйтгартай (uitgartai)	[ˈʊɪtʰ.ɢər.tʰæ]	'sad'

A "heavy syllable" is defined as one that is at least the length of a full vowel; short word-initial syllables are thereby excluded. If a word is bisyllabic and the only heavy syllable is word-final, it gets stressed anyway. In cases where there is only one phonemic short word-initial syllable, even this syllable can get the stress:

LˈH	галуу (galuu)	[ɢa.ˈɮʊ]	'goose'
ˈLL	уншсан (unshsan)	[ˈʊnʃ.səɴ]	'having read'

More recently, the most extensive collection of phonetic data so far in Mongolian studies has been applied to a partial account of stress placement in the closely related Chakhar dialect. The conclusion is drawn that di- and trisyllabic words with a short first syllable are stressed on the second syllable. But if their first syllable is long, then the data for different acoustic parameters seems to support conflicting conclusions: intensity data often seems to indicate that the first syllable is stressed, while F0 seems to indicate that it is the second syllable that is stressed.

== Writing systems ==
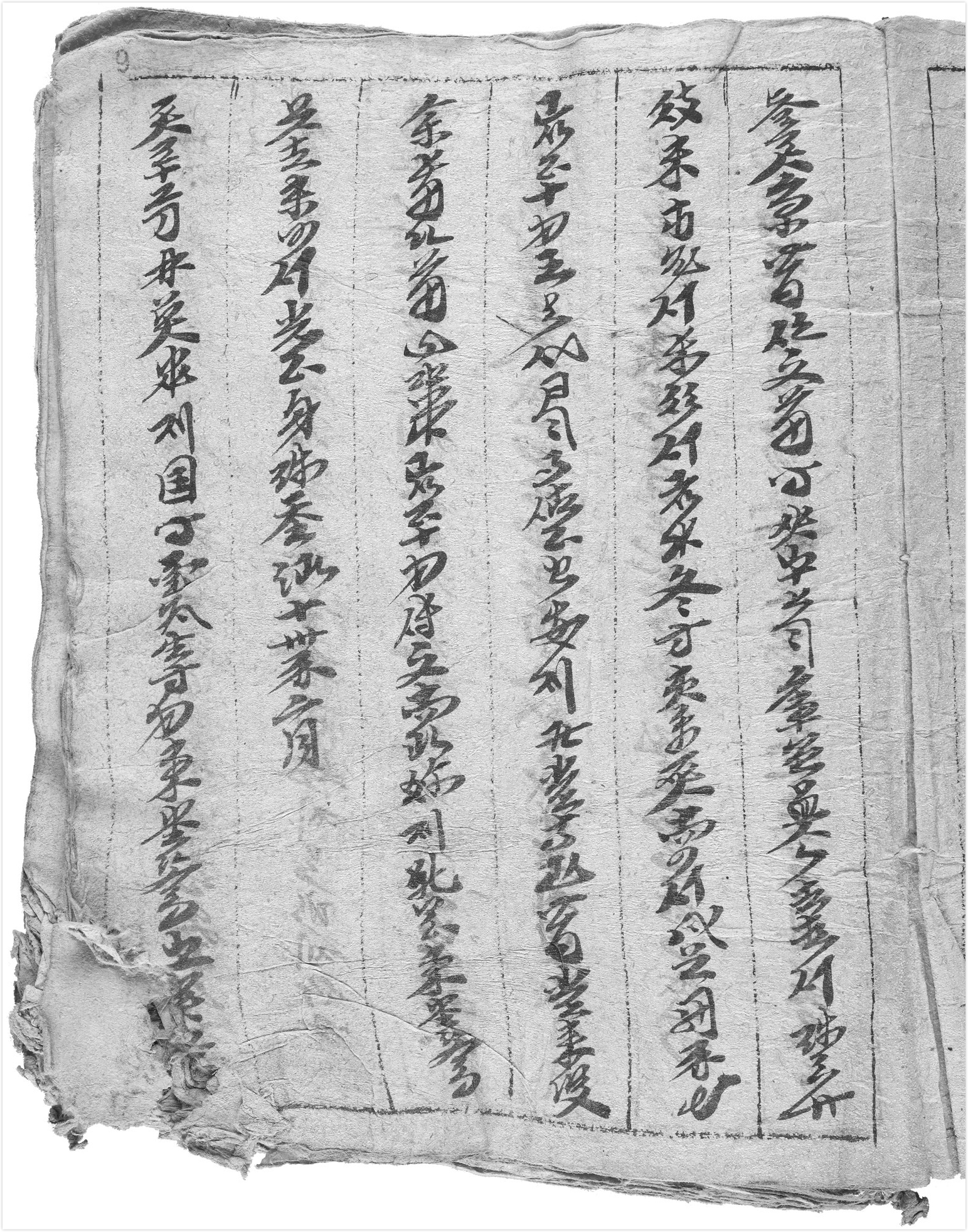
Nova N 176 found in Kyrgyzstan. The manuscript (dating to the 12th century Western Liao) is written in the Mongolic Khitan language using cursive Khitan large script. It has 127 leaves and 15,000 characters.

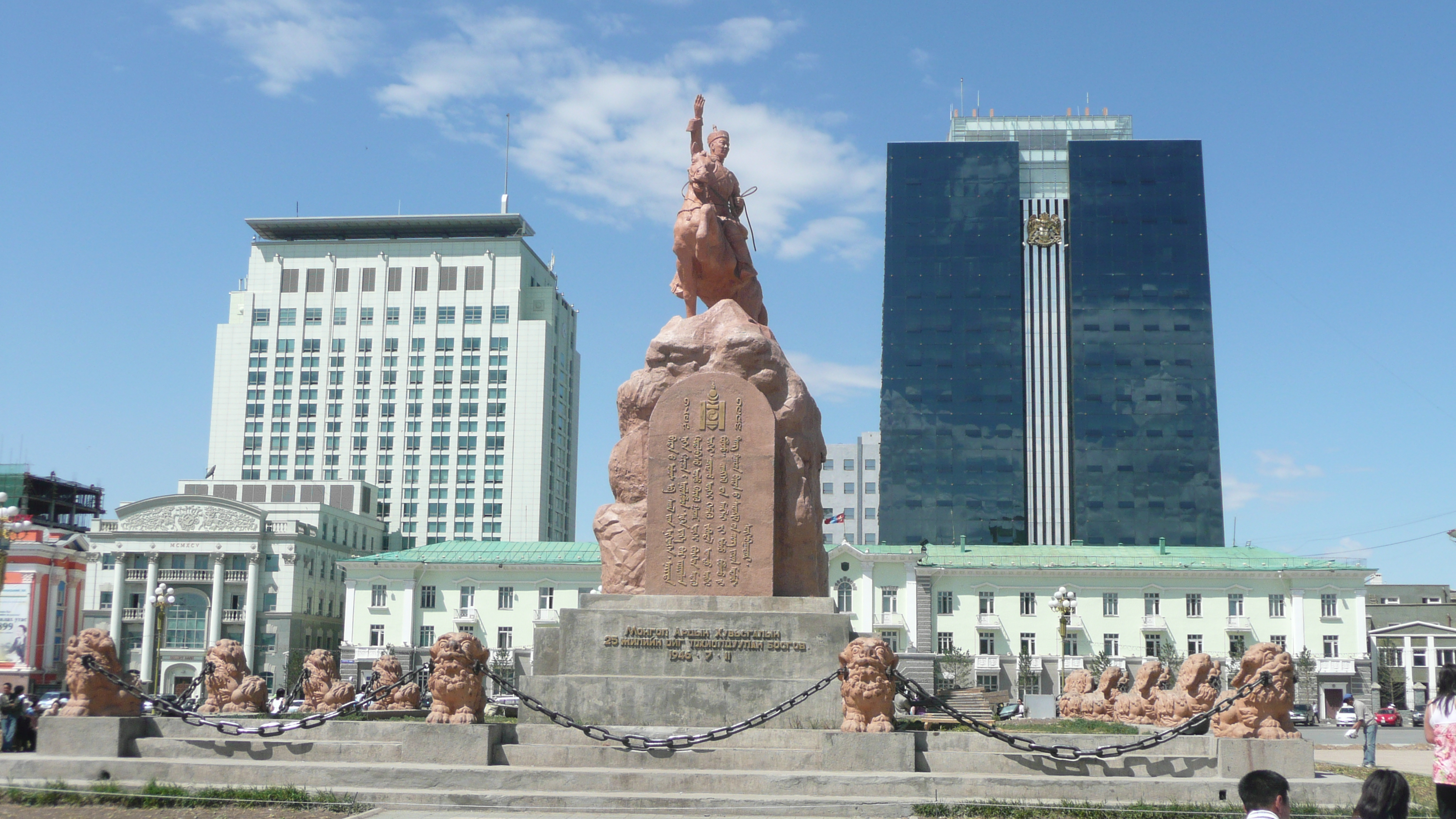
Mongolian script and Mongolian Cyrillic on Sükhbaatar's statue in Ulaanbaatar

Mongolian has been written in a variety of alphabets, making it a language with one of the largest number of scripts used historically. The earliest stages of Mongolian (Xianbei, Wuhuan languages) may have used an indigenous runic script as indicated by Chinese sources. The Khitan large script adopted in 920 CE is an early Mongol (or according to some, para-Mongolic) script.

The traditional Mongolian script was first adopted by Genghis Khan in 1204, who recognized the need to represent his own people's language. It developed from the Uyghur script when several members of the Uyghur elite who were brought into the Mongol confederation early on shared their knowledge of their written language with the Mongol imperial clan. Among the Uyghurs sharing that knowledge were Tata-tonga (Chinese: 塔塔統阿), Bilge Buqa (比俚伽普華), Kara Igach Buyruk (哈剌亦哈赤北魯), and Mengsus (孟速思). From that time, the script underwent some minor disambiguations and supplementation.

Between 1930 and 1932, a short-lived attempt was made to introduce the Latin script in the Mongolian state. In 1941, the Latin alphabet was adopted, though it lasted only two months.

The Mongolian Cyrillic script was the result of the spreading of Russian influence following the expansion of the Russian Empire. The establishment of the Soviet Union helped the influence continue, and the Cyrillic alphabet was slowly introduced with the effort by Russian/Soviet linguists in collaboration with their Mongolian counterparts. It was made mandatory by government decree in 1941. The introduction of the Cyrillic script, with its smaller discrepancy between written and spoken form, contributed to the success of the large-scale government literacy campaign, which increased the literacy rate from 17.3% to 73.5% between 1941 and 1950. Earlier government campaigns to eradicate illiteracy, employing the traditional script, had only managed to raise literacy from 3.0% to 17.3% between 1921 and 1940. From 1991 to 1994, an attempt at reintroducing the traditional alphabet failed in the face of popular resistance. In informal contexts of electronic text production, the use of the Latin alphabet is common.

In the People's Republic of China, Mandarin Chinese is the official language along with Mongolian in some regions, notably the entire Inner Mongolia Autonomous Region. The traditional alphabet has always been used there, although Cyrillic was considered briefly before the Sino-Soviet split. There are two types of written Mongolian used in China: the traditional Mongolian script, which is official among Mongols nationwide, and the Clear Script, used predominantly among Oirats in Xinjiang.

In March 2020, the Mongolian government announced plans to use both Cyrillic and the traditional Mongolian script in official documents by 2025.

== Grammar ==
The grammar in this article is also based primarily on Khalkha Mongolian. Unlike the phonology, most of what is said about morphology and syntax also holds true for Chakhar, while Khorchin is somewhat more diverse.

=== Morphology ===
Modern Mongolian is an agglutinative—almost exclusively suffixing—language, with the only exception being reduplication. Mongolian also does not have gendered nouns, or definite articles like "the". Most of the suffixes consist of a single morpheme. There are many derivational morphemes. For example, the word байгууллагийнх (baiguullagiinkh) consists of the root bai 'to be', an epenthetic ‑g‑, the causative ‑uul‑ (hence 'to cause to be', to found), the derivative suffix ‑laga that forms nouns created by the action (like -ation in organisation) and the complex suffix ‑iinkh denoting something that belongs to the modified word (‑iin would be genitive).

Nominal compounds are quite frequent. Some derivational verbal suffixes are rather productive, e.g. ярих (yarikh) 'to speak', ярилц (yarilc) 'to speak with each other'. Formally, the independent words derived using verbal suffixes can roughly be divided into three classes: final verbs, which can only be used sentence-finally, i.e. ‑na (mainly future or generic statements) or ‑ö (second person imperative); participles (often called "verbal nouns"), which can be used clause-finally or attributively, i.e. ‑san (perfect-past) or ‑maar 'want to'; and converbs, which can link clauses or function adverbially, i.e. ‑j (qualifies for any adverbial function or neutrally connects two sentences) or ‑tal (the action of the main clause takes place until the action expressed by the suffixed verb begins).

=== Nouns ===
Roughly speaking, Mongolian has between seven and nine cases: nominative (unmarked), genitive, dative-locative, accusative, ablative, instrumental, comitative, privative and directive, though the final two are not always considered part of the case paradigm. If a direct object is definite, it must take the accusative, while it must take the nominative if it is indefinite. In addition to case, a number of postpositions exist that usually govern the genitive, dative-locative, comitative and privative cases, including a marked form of the nominative (which can itself then take further case forms). There is also a possible attributive case (when a noun is used attributively), which is unmarked in most nouns but takes the suffix ‑н (‑n) when the stem has an unstable nasal. Nouns can also take a reflexive-possessive suffix, indicating that the marked noun is possessed by the subject of the sentence: bi naiz-aa avar-san I friend-reflexive-possessive save-perfect 'I saved my friend'. However, there are also somewhat noun-like adjectives to which case suffixes seemingly cannot be attached directly unless there is ellipsis.

Mongolian noun cases
Case	Suffix	English preposition	Example (Cyrillic)	Transliteration	Translation
nominative	–	–	ном	nom	book
accusative	‑г (‑g); ‑ыг (‑iig), ‑ийг (‑iig)	–	номыг	nomiig	the book (as object)
genitive	‑н (‑n); ‑ы (‑ii), ‑ий (‑ii); ‑ын (‑iin), ‑ийн (‑iin); ‑гийн (‑giin); ‑ны (‑nii), ‑ний (‑nii); ‑ины (‑inii), ‑иний (‑inii)	of	номын	nomiin	of (a) book; book's
dative-locative	‑д (‑d); ‑т (‑t); ‑ад (‑ad), ‑од (‑od), ‑өд (‑öd), ‑эд (‑ed); ‑ид (‑id); ‑нд (‑nd); ‑анд (‑and), ‑онд (‑ond), ‑өнд (‑önd), ‑энд (‑end); ‑инд (‑ind)	on, to, at, in	номд	nomd	in (a) book
ablative	‑аас (‑aas), ‑оос (‑oos), ‑өөс (‑öös), ‑ээс (‑ees); ‑иас (‑ias), ‑иос (‑ios), ‑иөс (‑iös), ‑иэс (‑ies); ‑наас (‑naas), ‑ноос (‑noos), ‑нөөс (‑nöös), ‑нээс (‑nees)	from	номоос	nomoos	from (a) book
instrumental	‑аар (‑aar), ‑оор (‑oor), ‑өөр (‑öör), ‑ээр (‑eer); ‑иар (‑iar), ‑иор (‑ior), ‑иөр (‑iör), ‑иэр (‑ier)	with, using	номоор	nomoor	with (e.g. by means of a) book
comitative	‑тай (‑tai), ‑той (‑toi), ‑тэй (‑tei)	together with	номтой	nomtoi	with (e.g. alongside a) book
privative	‑гүй (‑güi)	without	номгүй	nomgüi	without (a) book
directive	руу (ruu), рүү (rüü); луу (luu), лүү (lüü)	towards	ном руу	nom ruu	towards (a) book

The rules governing the morphology of Mongolian case endings are intricate, and so the rules given below are only indicative. In many situations, further (more general) rules must also be taken into account in order to produce the correct form: these include the presence of an unstable nasal or unstable velar, as well as the rules governing when a penultimate vowel should be deleted from the stem with certain case endings (e.g. цэрэг (tsereg) → цэргийн (tsergiin)). The additional morphological rules specific to loanwords are not covered.

==== Nominative case ====
The nominative case is used when a noun (or other part of speech acting as one) is the subject of the sentence, and the agent of whatever action (not just physically) takes place in the sentence. In Mongolian, the nominative case does not have an ending.

==== Accusative case ====
The accusative case is used when a noun acts as a direct object (or just "object"), and receives action from a transitive verb. It is formed by:

1. ‑г (‑g) after stems ending in long vowels or diphthongs, or when a stem ending in н (n) has an unstable velar (unstable g).
2. ‑ыг (‑iig) after back vowel stems ending in unpalatalized consonants (except г and к), short vowels (except и) or iotated vowels.
3. ‑ийг (‑iig) after front vowel stems ending in consonants, short vowels or iotated vowels; and after all stems ending in the palatalized consonants ж (j), ч (ch) and ш (sh), as well as г (g), к (k), и (i) or ь (i).

If the stem ends in a short vowel or ь (i), it is replaced by the suffix.

==== Genitive case ====
The genitive case is used to show possession of something.

- For regular stems, it is formed by:
  1. ‑н (‑n) after stems ending in the diphthongs ай (ai), ой (oi), эй (ei), яй (yai), ёй (yoi) or ей (yei), or the long vowel ий (ii).
  2. ‑ы (‑ii) after back vowel stems ending in н (n).
  3. ‑ий (‑ii) after front vowel stems ending in н (n).
  4. ‑ын (‑iin) after back vowel stems ending in unpalatalized consonants (except н, г and к), short vowels (except и) or iotated vowels.
  5. ‑ийн (‑iin) after front vowel stems ending in consonants (other than н), short vowels or iotated vowels; and after all stems ending in the palatalized consonants ж (j), ч (ch) and ш (sh), as well as г (g), к (k), и (i) or ь (i).
  6. ‑гийн (‑giin) after stems ending in a long vowel (other than ий), or after the diphthongs иа (ia), ио (io) or иу (iu).
  Note: If the stem ends in a short vowel or ь (i), it is replaced by the suffix.
- For stems with an unstable nasal (unstable n), it is formed by:
  1. ‑ны (‑nii) after back vowel stems (other than those ending in и or ь).
  2. ‑ний (‑nii) after front vowel stems (other than those ending in и or ь).
  3. ‑ины (‑inii) after back vowel stems ending in и (i) or ь (i).
  4. ‑иний (‑inii) after front vowel stems ending in и (i) or ь (i).
  Note: If the stem ends in и (i) or ь (i), it is replaced by the suffix.
- For stems with an unstable velar (unstable g), it is formed by ‑гийн (‑giin).

==== Dative-locative case ====
The dative-locative case is used to show the location of something, or to specify that something is in something else.

- For regular stems or those with an unstable velar (unstable g), it is formed by:
  1. ‑д (‑d) after stems ending in vowels or the vocalized consonants л (l), м (m) and н (n), and a small number of stems ending in в (v) and р (r).
  2. ‑т (‑t) after stems ending in г (g) and к (k), most stems ending in в (v) and р (r), and stems ending in с (s) when it is preceded by a vowel.
  3. ‑ид (‑id) after stems ending in the palatalized consonants ж (j), ч (ch) and ш (sh).
  4. ‑ад (‑ad), ‑од (‑od), ‑өд (‑öd) or ‑эд (‑ed) after all other stems (depending on the vowel harmony of the stem).
- For stems with an unstable nasal (unstable n), it is formed by:
  1. ‑нд (‑nd) after stems ending in vowels.
  2. ‑инд (‑ind) after stems ending in the palatalized consonants ж (j), ч (ch) and ш (sh).
  3. ‑анд (‑and), ‑онд (‑ond), ‑өнд (‑önd) or ‑энд (‑end) after all other stems (depending on the vowel harmony of the stem).

==== Plurals ====
Plurality may be left unmarked, but there are overt plurality markers, some of which are restricted to humans. A noun that is modified by a numeral usually does not take any plural affix. There are many ways of forming plurals in Mongolian:

1. Some plurals are formed by adding -нууд -nuud or -нүүд -nüüd. If the last vowel of the previous word is a (a), o (y), or ɔ (o), then -нууд is used; e.g. харx kharkh 'rat' becomes xapхнууд kharkhnuud 'rats'. If the last vowel of the previous word is e (э), ʊ (ө), ü (ү), or i (и) then нүүд is used; e.g. нүд nüd 'eye' becomes нүднүүд nüdnüüd 'eyes'.
2. In other plurals, just -ууд -uud or -үүд -üüd is added without the "n"; e.g. хот khot 'city' becomes хотууд khotuud 'cities', and ээж eej 'mother' becomes ээжүүд eejüüd 'mothers'.
3. Also -чууд or -чүүд is used sometimes; e.g бага baga ‘little’ becomes багачууд bagachuud ‘little ones’.
4. Plus -д is used if the word ends in "unstable n" or vowel ; e.g. хаан khaan ‘king’ becomes хаад khaad ‘kings’.
5. Another way of forming plurals is by adding -нар -nar; e.g. багш bagsh 'teacher' becomes багш нар bagsh nar 'teachers'.
6. The -чуул or -чүүл suffix is used rarely in some words; e.g. хөгшин khögshin ‘senior/old’ becomes хөгшчүүл khögshchüül ‘seniors’.
7. Adding to that, -с is used in few words; e.g. үг üg ‘word’ becomes үгс ügs ‘words’.
8. The final way is an irregular form used: хүн khün 'person' becomes хүмүүс khümüüs 'people'.

=== Pronouns ===
Personal pronouns exist for the first and second person, while the old demonstrative pronouns have come to form third person (proximal and distal) pronouns. Other word (sub-)classes include interrogative pronouns, conjunctions (which take participles), spatials, and particles, the last being rather numerous.

Personal Pronouns
			Nominative (subject)	Accusative (object)	Genitive (possession)	Oblique stem (all other cases)
1st person	singular		би bi	намайг namaig	миний minii	над- nad-
1st person	plural	exclusive	бид bid	биднийг bidniig	бидний bidnii	бидн- bidn-
1st person	plural	inclusive	бид bid	биднийг bidniig	манай manai	ман- man-
2nd person	singular	familiar	чи chi	чамайг chamaig	чиний chinii	чам- cham-
2nd person	singular	polite	та ta	таныг taniig	таны tanii	
2nd person	plural		та нар ta nar	–	танай/та нарын tanai/ta nariin	тан- tan-
3rd person	singular		тэр ter	түүнийг tüüniig	түүний tüünii	–
3rd person	plural		тэд ted	тэднийг tedniig	тэд нарын ted nariin	–

=== Negation ===
Negation is mostly expressed by -güi (-гүй) after participles and by the negation particle bish (биш) after nouns and adjectives; negation particles preceding the verb (for example in converbal constructions) exist, but tend to be replaced by analytical constructions.

=== Numbers ===
Pronunciation and writing of numbers in text
N	Text in Mongolian	N	Text in Mongolian	N	Text in Mongolian
0	тэг teg	10	арав arav	20	хорь, khori
1	нэг neg	11	арван нэг arvan neg	30	гуч guch
2	хоёр khoyor	12	арван хоёр arvan khoyor	40	дөч döch
3	гурав gurav	13	арван гурав arvan gurav	50	тавь tavi
4	дөрөв döröv	14	арван дөрөв arvan döröv	60	жар jar
5	тав tav	15	арван тав arvan tav	70	дал dal
6	зургаа zurgaa	16	арван зургаа arvan zurgaa	80	ная naya
7	долоо doloo	17	арван долоо arvan doloo	90	ер yer
8	найм naim	18	арван найм arvan naim	100	нэг зуу neg zuu
9	ес yös	19	арван ес arvan yös	200	хоёр зуу khoyor zuu

=== Forming questions ===
When asking questions in Mongolian, a question marker is used to show a question is being asked. There are different question markers for yes/no questions and for information questions. For yes/no questions, уу and үү are used when the last word ends in a short vowel or a consonant, and their use depends on the vowel harmony of the previous word. When the last word ends in a long vowel or a diphthong, then юу and юү are used (again depending on vowel harmony). For information questions (questions asking for information with an interrogative word like who, what, when, where, why, etc.), the question particles are вэ and бэ, depending on the last sound in the previous word.

1. Yes/No Question Particles -уу/үү/юу/юү (uu/üü/yuu/yuü)
2. Open Ended Question Particles -бэ/вэ (be/ve)

Basic interrogative pronouns -юу (yuu 'what'), -хаана (khaana 'where'), хэн (hen 'who'), яагаад (yaagaad 'why'), яаж (yaaj 'how'), хэзээ (khezee 'when'), ямар (yamar 'what kind')

=== Verbs ===
In Mongolian, verbs have a stem and an ending. For example, the stems бай- bai-, сур- sur-, and үзэ- üze- are suffixed with -х -kh, -ах -akh, and -х -kh respectively: байx baikh, сурax surakh, and үзэx üzekh. These are the infinitive or dictionary forms. The present/future tense is formed by adding -на -na, -но -no, -нэ -ne, or -нө -nö to the stem, for example сурна surna 'I/you/he/she/we/they (will) study'. байна baina is the present/future tense verb for 'to be'; likewise, уншина unshina is 'to read', and үзнэ üzne is 'to see'. The final vowel is barely pronounced and is not pronounced at all if the word after begins with a vowel, so сайн байна уу sain bain uu is pronounced [sæe̯m‿pæe̯n‿ʊː] 'hello, how are you?'.

1. Past Tense -сан/-сон/-сэн/-сөн (-san/-son/-sen/-sön)
2. Informed Past Tense (any point in past) -в (-v)
3. Informed Past Tense (not long ago) -лаа/-лоо/-лээ/-лөө (-laa/-loo/-lee/-löö)
4. Non-Informed Past Tense (generally a slightly to relatively more distant past) -жээ/-чээ (-jee/-chee)
5. Present Perfect Tense -даг/-дог/-дэг/-дөг (-dag/-dog/-deg/-dög)
6. Present Progressive Tense -ж/-ч байна (-j/-ch baina)
7. (Reflective) Present Progressive Tense -аа/-оо/-ээ/-өө (-aa/-oo/-ee/-öö)
8. Simple Present Tense -на/-но/-нэ/-нө (-na/-no/-ne/-nö)
9. Simple Future -х (болно) (-h (bolno))
10. Infinitive -х (-h)

=== Negation ===
There are several ways to form negatives in Mongolian. For example:

1. биш (bish) – the negative form of the verb 'to be' (байх baikh) – биш means 'is/are not'.
2. -гүй (güi). This suffix is added to verbs, so явах (yavakh 'go/will go') becomes явахгүй (yavakhgüi 'do not go/will not go').
3. үгүй (ügüi) is the word for 'no'.
4. битгий (bitgii) is used for negative imperatives; e.g. битгий яваарай (bitgii yavaarai 'don't go')
5. бүү (büü) is the formal version of битгий.

== Syntax ==
=== Differential case marking ===
Mongolian uses differential case marking, being a regular differential object marking (DOM) language. DOM emerges from a complicated interaction of factors such as referentiality, animacy and topicality.

Mongolian also exhibits a specific type of differential subject marking (DSM), in which the subjects of embedded clauses (including adverbial clauses) occur with accusative case.

=== Phrase structure ===
The noun phrase has the order: demonstrative pronoun/numeral, adjective, noun. Attributive sentences precede the whole NP. Titles or occupations of people, low numerals indicating groups, and focus clitics are put behind the head noun. Possessive pronouns (in different forms) may either precede or follow the NP. Examples:

bid-nii uulz-san ter saikhan zaluu-gaas ch
we-GEN meet-PRF that beautiful young.man-ABL FOC
'even from that beautiful young man that we have met'

Dorj bagsh maan
Dorj teacher our
'our teacher Dorj'

The verbal phrase consists of the predicate in the center, preceded by its complements and by the adverbials modifying it and followed (mainly if the predicate is sentence-final) by modal particles, as in the following example with predicate bichsen:

ter khel-ekh-güi-geer üün-iig bich-sen shüü
s/he without:saying it-ACC write-PRF PTC
's/he wrote it without saying [so] [i.e. without saying that s/he would do so, or that s/he had done so], I can assure you.'

In this clause the adverbial, хэлэхгүйгээр (khelekhgüigeer) 'without saying [so]' must precede the predicate's complement, üüniig 'it-accusative' in order to avoid syntactic ambiguity, since khelekhgüigeer is itself derived from a verb and hence an üüniig preceding it could be construed as its complement. If the adverbial was an adjective such as khurdan 'fast', it could optionally immediately precede the predicate. There are also cases in which the adverb must immediately precede the predicate.

For Khalkha, the most complete treatment of the verbal forms is by Luvsanvandan (ed.) (1987). However, the analysis of predication presented here, while valid for Khalkha, is adapted from the description of Khorchin.

Most often, of course, the predicate consists of a verb. However, there are several types of nominal predicative constructions, with or without a copula. Auxiliaries that express direction and aktionsart (among other meanings) can with the assistance of a linking converb occupy the immediate postverbal position; e.g.

uuj orkhison
drink-CVB leave-PERF
'drank up'

The next position is filled by converb suffixes in connection with the auxiliary, baj- 'to be', e.g.

ter güij baina
s/he run-CVB be-NPAST
'she is running'

Suffixes occupying this position express grammatical aspect; e.g. progressive and resultative. In the next position, participles followed by baj- may follow, e.g.,

ter irsen baina
s/he come-PERF be-NPAST
'he has come'

Here, an explicit perfect and habituality can be marked, which is aspectual in meaning as well. This position may be occupied by multiple suffixes in a single predication, and it can still be followed by a converbal Progressive. The last position is occupied by suffixes that express tense, evidentiality, modality, and aspect.

=== Clauses ===
Unmarked phrase order is subject–object–predicate. While the predicate generally has to remain in clause-final position, the other phrases are free to change order or to wholly disappear. The topic tends to be placed clause-initially, new information rather at the end of the clause. Topic can be overtly marked with bol, which can also mark contrastive focus, overt additive focus ('even, also') can be marked with the clitic ch, and overt restrictive focus with the clitic l ('only').

The inventory of voices in Mongolian consists of passive, causative, reciprocal, plurative, and cooperative. In a passive sentence, the verb takes the suffix -gd- and the agent takes either dative or instrumental case, the first of which is more common. In the causative, the verb takes the suffix -uul-, the causee (the person caused to do something) in a transitive action (e.g. 'raise') takes dative or instrumental case, and the causee in an intransitive action (e.g. 'rise') takes accusative case. Causative morphology is also used in some passive contexts:

Bi tüün-d khuurt-san
I that.one-DAT fool-CAUS-PRF
'I was fooled by her/him'.

The semantic attribute of animacy is syntactically important: thus the sentence, 'the bread was eaten by me', which is acceptable in English, would not be acceptable in Mongolian. The reciprocal voice is marked by -ld-, the plurative by -cgaa-, and the cooperative by -lc-.

Mongolian allows for adjectival depictives that relate to either the subject or the direct object, e.g. Liena nücgen untdag 'Lena sleeps naked', while adjectival resultatives are marginal.

=== Complex sentences ===
One way to conjoin clauses is to have the first clause end in a converb, as in the following example using the converb -bol:

bid üün-iig ol-bol cham-d ög-nö
we it-ACC find-COND.CVB you.FAM-DAT give-FUT
'if we find it we'll give it to you'

Some verbal nouns in the dative (or less often in the instrumental) function very similar to converbs: e.g. replacing olbol in the preceding sentence with olohod find-imperfective-dative yields 'when we find it we'll give it to you'. Quite often, postpositions govern complete clauses. In contrast, conjunctions take verbal nouns without case:

yadar-san uchraas unt-laa
become.tired-PRF because sleep-WIT.PAST
'I slept because I was tired'

Finally, there is a class of particles, usually clause-initial, that are distinct from conjunctions but that also relate clauses:

bi olson, kharin chamd ögökhgüi
I find-PRF but you-DAT give-IPFV-NEG
'I've found it, but I won't give it to you'.

Mongolian has a complementizer auxiliary verb ge- very similar to Japanese to iu. ge- literally means 'to say' and in converbal form gej precedes either a psych verb or a verb of saying. As a verbal noun like gedeg (with ni) it can form a subset of complement clauses. As gene it may function as an evidentialis marker.

Mongolian clauses tend to be combined paratactically, which sometimes gives rise to sentence structures which are subordinative despite resembling coordinative structures in European languages:

ter ir-eed namaig üns-sen
that.one come-CVB I.ACC kiss-PRF
'S/he came and kissed me.'

In the subordinate clause the subject, if different from the subject of main clause, sometimes has to take accusative or genitive case. There is marginal occurrence of subjects taking ablative case as well. Subjects of attributive clauses in which the head has a function (as is the case for all English relative clauses) usually require that if the subject is not the head, then it take the genitive, e.g. түүний идсэн хоол (tüünii idsen khool) that.one-genitive eat-perfect meal 'the meal that s/he had eaten'.

== Loanwords and coined words ==
Mongolian first adopted loanwords from many languages including Old Turkic, Sanskrit (these often via Uyghur), Persian, Tibetan, Tungusic, and Chinese. However, more recent loanwords come from Russian, English, and Mandarin Chinese (mainly in Inner Mongolia). Language commissions of the Mongolian state continuously translate new terminology into Mongolian, so as the Mongolian vocabulary now has yörönkhiilögch 'president' ('generalizer') and shar airag 'beer' ('yellow kumys'). There are several loan translations, e.g. galt tereg 'train' ('fire cart') from Chinese huǒchē (火车 'fire cart') 'train'. Other loan translations include mön chanar 'essence' from Chinese shízhì (实质 'true quality'), khün am 'population' from Chinese rénkǒu (人口 'person mouth'), erdene shish 'corn, maize' from Chinese yùmǐ (玉米 'jade rice') and bügd nairamdakh uls 'republic' from Chinese gònghéguó (共和国 'public collaboration nation').

- Sanskrit loanwords include shashin (शशन shashana 'religion'), sansar (सँसार sansāra 'space'), aviyas (अभ्यास abhyasa 'talent'), buyan (पुण्य punya 'good deeds'), agshin (क्षण kšana 'instant'), tiv (द्वीप dvipa 'continent'), garig (ग्रह graha 'planet'), cadig (जातक jātaka 'tales, stories'), shüleg (श्लोक šloka 'poems, verses'), badag (पदक padaka 'strophe'), arshan (रसायन rašayana 'mineral water, nectar'), shastir (शास्त्र shastra 'chronicle'), bud (बुध budh 'Mercury'), sugar (शुक्र shukra 'Venus'), barkhasvadi (वृहस्पति vrihaspati 'Jupiter'), and sanchir (शनि shani 'Saturn').
- Persian loanwords include anar (anar 'amethyst'), arkhi (arâgh 'brandy'), baishin (pishivân 'building'), bars (fars 'tiger'), bers (farzin 'chess queen; female tiger'), bold (pulâd 'steel'), bolor (bolur 'crystal'), gunjid (konjed 'sesame'), gindan (zendân 'prison'), dari (dâru 'powder/gunpowder; medicine'), duran (dur 'telescope'), duranbai (durbin 'telescope/microscope'), devter (daftar 'notebook'), khurmast (Ohrmazd 'high God'), savan (sâbun 'soap'), sandal (sandali 'stool'), and com (jâm 'cup').
- Chinese loanwords include banz (板子 bǎnzi 'board'), laa (蜡 là 'candle'), luuvan (萝卜 luóbo 'radish'), khuluu (葫芦 húlu 'gourd'), denlüü (灯路 dēnglù 'lamp'), chiiden (汽灯 qìdēng 'electric lamp'), biir (笔儿 bǐr 'paintbrush'), gambanz (斩板子 zhǎnbǎnzi 'cutting board'), chinjuu (青椒 qīngjiāo 'pepper'), juucai (韭菜 jiǔcài 'leek'), moog (蘑菇 mógu 'mushroom'), cuu (醋 cù 'vinegar, soy sauce'), baicaa (白菜 báicài 'cabbage'), mantuu (馒头 mántóu 'steamed bun'), naimaa/maimaa (买卖 mǎimài 'trade'), goimon (挂面 gùamiàn 'noodles'), dan (单 dān 'single'), gan (钢 gāng 'steel'), lantuu (榔头 lángtóu 'sledgehammer'), conkh (窗户 chūanghu 'window'), buuz (包子 bāozi 'dumplings'), khuushuur (火烧儿 hǔoshāor 'fried dumpling'), zutan (乳脂汤 rǔzhītāng 'cream soup'), bantan (粉汤 fěntāng 'flour soup'), jan (酱 jiàng 'soy'), van (王 wáng 'king'), günj (公主 gōngzhǔ 'princess'), gün (公 gōng 'duke'), janjin (将军 jiāngjūn 'general'), taigan (太监 tàijiàn 'eunuch'), pianz (片子 piànzi 'recorded disc'), guanz (馆子 guǎnzi 'restaurant'), liankhua (莲花 liánhuā 'lotus'), khuar (花儿 huār 'flower'), toor (桃儿 táor 'peach'), intoor (樱桃儿 yīngtáor 'cherry'), zeel (借 jiè 'to borrow, to lend'), vandui (豌豆 wāndòu 'pea'), yanz (样子 yàngzi 'manner, appearance'), shinj (性质 xìngzhì 'characteristic'), liir (梨儿 lír 'pear'), bai (牌 páizi 'target'), jin (斤 jīn 'weight'), bin (饼 bǐng 'pancake'), khuanli (皇历 huángli 'calendar'), shaazan (烧瓷 shāocí 'porcelain'), khantaaz (砍兜肚 kǎndōudu 'sleeveless vest'), püntüüz (粉条子 fěntiáozi 'potato noodles'), and cai (茶 chá 'tea').

In the 20th century, many Russian loanwords entered the Mongolian language, including doktor 'doctor', shokolad 'chocolate', vagon 'train wagon', kalendar 'calendar', sistem 'system', podvoolk (from futbolka 'T-shirt'), and mashin 'car'.

In more recent times, due to socio-political reforms, Mongolian has loaned various words from English; some of which have gradually evolved as official terms: menejment 'management', komputer 'computer', fail 'file', marketing 'marketing', kredit 'credit', onlain 'online', and mesej 'message'. Most of these are confined to the Mongolian state.

In turn, other languages have borrowed words from Mongolian. Examples (Mongolian in brackets) include Persian کشيكچى kešikci (from kheshig 'royal guard'), قرقاول qarqâvol (from gurgaa 'pheasant'), جیبه jibe (from jebseg 'iron armour'), داروغه dâruqe (from darga 'chief of commandant'), قیچی qeyci (from khaich 'scissors'); Uzbek orol (from aral 'island'); Chinese 衚衕 hutong (from gudum 'passageway'), 站赤 zhanchi (from jamchi 'courier/post station'); Middle Chinese 犢 duk (from tugul 'calf'); Korean 수라 sura (from shüle 'royal meal'), 악대 akdae (from agta 'castrated animal'), 업진 eobjin (from ebchigün 'chest of an animal'); Old English cocer (from khökhüür 'container'); Old French quivre (from khökhüür 'container'); Old High German Baldrian (from balchirgan-a 'valerian plant'). Köküür and balchirgan-a are thought to have been brought to Europe by the Huns or Pannonian Avars. Many of these languages, such as English, has borrowed the word Khan as the word for the leader of the Mongol Khanate.

Despite having a diverse range of loanwords, Mongolian dialects such as Khalkha and Khorchin, within a comparative vocabulary of 452 words of Common Mongolic vocabulary, retain as many as 95% of these native words, contrasting e.g. with Southern Mongolic languages at 39–77% retentions.

== Sample text ==
Article 1 of the Universal Declaration of Human Rights in Mongolian, written in the Cyrillic alphabet:

Хүн бүр төрж мэндлэхэд эрх чөлөөтэй, адилхан нэр төртэй, ижил эрхтэй байдаг. Оюун ухаан, нандин чанар заяасан хүн гэгч өөр хоорондоо ахан дүүгийн үзэл санаагаар харьцах учиртай.

Khün bür törj mendlekhed erkh chölöötei, adilkhan ner törtei, ijil erkhtei baidag. Oyuun ukhaan nandin chanar zayaasan khün gegch öör khoorondoo akhan düügiin üzel sanaagaar kharicakh uchirtai.

Article 1 of the Universal Declaration of Human Rights in Mongolian, written in the Mongolian script:

ᠬᠦᠮᠦᠨ ᠪᠦᠷᠢ ᠲᠥᠷᠦᠵᠦ ᠮᠡᠨᠳᠦᠯᠡᠬᠦ ᠳᠦ ᠡᠷᠬᠡ ᠴᠢᠯᠦᠭᠡ ᠲᠡᠢ᠂ ᠠᠳᠠᠯᠢᠬᠠᠨ ᠨᠡᠷ᠎ᠡ ᠲᠥᠷᠦ ᠲᠡᠢ᠂ ᠢᠵᠢᠯ ᠡᠷᠬᠡ ᠲᠡᠢ ᠪᠠᠢᠳᠠᠭ᠃ ᠣᠶᠤᠨ ᠤᠬᠠᠭᠠᠨ᠂ ᠨᠠᠨᠳᠢᠨ ᠴᠢᠨᠠᠷ ᠵᠠᠶᠠᠭᠠᠰᠠᠨ ᠬᠦᠮᠦᠨ ᠭᠡᠭᠴᠢ ᠥᠭᠡᠷ᠎ᠡ ᠬᠣᠭᠤᠷᠤᠨᠳᠤ ᠪᠠᠨ ᠠᠬᠠᠨ ᠳᠡᠭᠦᠦ ᠶᠢᠨ ᠦᠵᠢᠯ ᠰᠠᠨᠠᠭᠠ ᠢᠶᠠᠷ ᠬᠠᠷᠢᠴᠠᠬᠤ ᠤᠴᠢᠷ ᠲᠠᠢ᠃

Kümün büri törüǰü mendülekü-dü erke čilüge-tei, adaliqan ner-e törü-tei, iǰil erke-tei bayidaɣ. Oyun uqaɣan, nandin činar ǰayaɣasan kümün gegči öger-e qoɣurundu-ban aqan degüü-yin üǰil sanaɣa-iyar qaričaqu učir-tai.

Article 1 of the Universal Declaration of Human Rights in Mongolian, transcribed using the International Phonetic Alphabet:

[xuɴ pur̥ tʰɵr̥t͡ɕ ˈmintɮɘ̆xɘt ir̥x t͡ɕʰɵˈɮɵtʰe ˈɛtɪɬχəɴ nir̥ ˈtʰɵr̥tʰe ˈit͡ɕɪɬ ir̥xˈtʰe ˈpɛtəq ‖ ɔˈjʊɴ ʊˈχaɴ ˈnantɪɴ ˈt͡ɕʰanər̥ t͡saˈjasəɴ xuɴ kixt͡ɕʰ ˈɵr̥ ˈχɔɾɜntɔ ˈaχəɴ ˈtuɣiɴ ˈut͡sɘɬ saˈnaʁar̥ ˈχɛr̥ʲt͡sʰəχ ʊt͡ɕʰɪr̥ˈtʰɛ ‖]

Article 1 of the Universal Declaration of Human Rights in English:

All human beings are born free and equal in dignity and rights. They are endowed with reason and conscience and should act towards one another in a spirit of brotherhood.

== See also ==
- Mongolian writing systems
  - Mongolian script
    - Galik alphabet
    - Todo alphabet
  - ʼPhags-pa script
    - Horizontal square script
  - Soyombo script
  - Mongolian Latin alphabet
    - SASM/GNC romanization § Mongolian
  - Mongolian Cyrillic alphabet
  - Mongolian transliteration of Chinese characters
    - Sino–Mongolian Transliterations
  - Mongolian Braille
- Mongolian Sign Language
- Mongolian name
