= Mongolian Latin alphabet =

1931–1941 Latin alphabet used for Mongolian in Mongolia

The Mongolian Latin script (Note: Mongolian Cyrillic: Монгол Латин үсэг, Mongol Latin üseg; Mongolian Latin: Mongol Latiin ysyg; Traditional Mongolian script: ᠮᠣᠩᠭᠣᠯ ᠯᠠᠲ᠋ᠢᠨ ᠦᠰᠦᠭ; IPA: [ˈmɔŋɡɔɮ ɮɑˈtin usəx]) was officially adopted in Mongolia in 1931 but declined in 1933. In 1941, a second version of the Latin alphabet was introduced and was replaced by the Cyrillic script in the same year.

== History ==
=== In Mongolia ===
By the beginning of the 20th century, the peoples of the Mongolian language group used predominantly the Mongolian vertical script and its variations. In the 1920s, the USSR began the process of converting the scripts of various peoples of the country to the Latin alphabet. By the end of the 1920s, two peoples living in the USSR who spoke Mongolian languages, the Kalmyks and the Buryats, had switched to the Latin alphabet. The Mongolian People's Republic, whose official language was Mongolian, was at that time heavily dependent on the USSR in political and cultural terms, which led to the beginning of Latinization there as well.

In early 1929, the Soviet linguist Nicholas Poppe published a project for a Latin alphabet that would be common to the Buryat and Mongolian languages. He proposed using the following letters: A a, B b, C c, Ç ç, D d, E e, F f, G g, I i, J j, K k, L l, M m, N n, ꞑ, O o, Ɵ ɵ, P p, R r, S s, T t, U u, Y y, X x, V v. A distinctive feature of the project was the use of the letter i not only to denote a vowel sound, but also as a modifier letter. Thus, c was to denote the sound [ч], ci — [ц], ç — [дз], çi — [дж], s — [с], si — [ш]. The letters p, f, v, k were proposed to write foreign borrowings. Long vowels were indicated by doubling the corresponding letter. In June 1929, another version of the alphabet, developed by Khabaev and Baradin, was approved for the Buryat language. This forced Poppe to revise his project and publish another version in early 1930, primarily aimed at the Mongolian language. In this version, the author proposed the following system for indicating sibilant and hissing sounds: c — [ч], ç — [ц], z — [дз], ƶ — [дж], s — [с], ş — [ш]. Poppe's revised project eventually included the following letters: A a, B b, C c, Ç ç, D d, E e, F f, G g, I i, K k, L l, M m, N n, O o, Ɵ ɵ, P p, R r, S s, Ș ş, T t, U u, Y y, Z z, Ƶ ƶ, X x, V v.

External image
- A poster promoting the Latinized alphabet. Early 1930s

In the first half of 1930, the VIII Congress of the Mongolian People's Revolutionary Party proposed switching from the Old Mongolian script to the Latin alphabet. This proposal was supported by the Great People’s Khural and the government, which was confirmed by Decree No. 36 of October 31, 1930. The new alphabet, consisting of 30 letters, was first published in the newspaper Ynen on February 19, 1930. This alphabet was more of a transliteration of the Old Mongolian script than a fundamentally new approach to orthography. From January 10 to 17, 1931, a conference of the Mongolian group of peoples on writing and language issues was held in Moscow. A delegation from the MPR, headed by the Minister of Education, was present. The conference decided to adopt the Latin alphabet of 27 letters for the Mongolian language: A a, B b, C c, Ç ç, D d, E e, F f, G g, H h, I i, J j, K k, L l, M m, N n, O o, Ɵ ɵ, P p, R r, S s, Ş ş, T t, U u, V v, Y y, Z z, Ƶ ƶ.

Since 1931, it was this version of the alphabet that began to appear on the pages of the Mongolian press. Individual articles in newspapers were printed in it, and the titles and imprints of individual books were duplicated. However, most of the literature and press were still printed in the Old Mongolian script. At the same time, already in 1933, the MPR began to abandon Latinization, and even the rudimentary use of the Latin alphabet ceased. Moreover, during the political repressions in 1937, the former Minister of Education was accused of attempting to “destroy the national Mongolian script”.

The issue of switching to the Latin alphabet in the Mongolian People's Republic was raised again in 1940, when the USSR had already abandoned Latinization and began to convert the scripts of national minorities to Cyrillic. In April 1940, the proposal to switch to the Latin alphabet was voiced at the 10th Congress of the Mongolian People's Revolutionary Party and supported by the Great People's Khural. On July 26, 1940, Choibalsan signed a decree on the creation of a commission on Latinization under the leadership of Tsedenbal. The committee was tasked with developing a new alphabet with the aim of "developing industry, livestock breeding, trade, culture, education and literacy by eliminating the old, backward script." From the Academy of Sciences, the commission included Tsendiin Damdinsüren and Shadavyn Luvsanvandan. In addition to the alphabet, the commission also developed a new orthography. On February 21, 1941, Mongolia officially switched to the Latin alphabet.

Mongolian romanized alphabet, adopted in 1941:

A a	B b	C c	Ch ch	D d	E e	F f	G g
H h	I i	J j	K k	L l	M m	N n	O o
Ɵ ɵ	P p	Q q	R r	S s	Sh sh	T t	U u
W w	X x	Y y	Z z	Zh zh

The length of vowels was indicated by an apostrophe after the letter.

However, a month later, on March 25, 1941, the Latin alphabet was abolished in the Mongolian People's Republic and replaced by the Cyrillic alphabet, which is still used, with some changes, to this day.

In the Mongolian version of the Latin alphabet, there were additional letters ɵ (Cyrillic: ө), ç (ч), ş (ш) and ƶ (ж); Y corresponded to the Cyrillic ү. K transliterated the sound that would later come to be represented in Cyrillic by х in native Mongolian words.

=== In China ===
The question of romanization of Mongolian script in China was first raised in 1958. Two years later, the government of Inner Mongolia addressed the central authorities with this question, but this appeal remained without consequences. The proposed alphabet looked like this: A a, B b, C c, D d, E e, F f, G g, H h, I i, J j, K k, L l, M m, N n, O o, P p, Q q, R r, S s, T t, U u, W w, Y y, Z z, ô, û.

In 1975, preparations began in China for the romanization of Mongolian writing in Mongol areas based on the pinyin system used for Mandarin Chinese. According to the plan, the Latin alphabet should have been introduced in 1977, but the death of Mao Zedong and the changes in domestic policy that had begun did not allow the project to materialize. This system forms the basis of the SASM/GNC romanization of Mongolian that has been used in China to transcribe personal names and toponyms since 1978. The alphabet of the 1970s project looked like this: a, b, c, č, d, e, f, g, h, i, k, l, m, n, ng, o, ɵ, p, r, s, š, t, u, ʉ, w, y, z, ž.

Despite being neither widely promoted nor having any official status, Mongolians were increasingly using Latin script on smartphones and social networking services as of 2019.

== Characters ==
First Latin alphabet was using "y" as feminine "u", with additional feminine "o" ("ɵ") and with additional consonants "ç" for "ch", "ş" for "sh" and "ƶ" for "j", it successfully served in printing books and newspapers. A few of the letters (f, p, v) were rarely used, being found only in borrowings, while q, w and x were excluded altogether. Since k transcribed [h] in loans, it is unclear how loans in [kʰ] were written. The letter "j" is used for the sound [j]. Letter "c" is used for the sound [ts] and "k" is used for the sound [h]. The first version was inspired by the Yanalif script used for the Soviet Union's Turkic languages.

The second version of Latin alphabet made few minor changes. That change was including replacement of "v" by "w" and also "k" by "x" in native words. The letter "q" was added. Also the letters "ç", "ş", "ƶ" were replaced by the digraphs ch, sh, zh. Doubling vowels to represent length was replaced by the apostrophe. And the rest of the alphabet and orthography kept same.

=== List of characters ===
IPA		a	e	i	ɔ	ʊ	ɵ	u	n ŋ	m	ɮ	p w	pʰ	f	kʰ	χ h	q ɡ	s	ʃ	tʰ	t	t͡s	t͡ʃ	d͡z	d͡ʒ	j	r	h
Mongolian		ᠠ	ᠡ	ᠢ	ᠣ	ᠤ	ᠥ	ᠦ	ᠨ	ᠮ	ᠯ	ᠪ	ᠫ	ᠹ	ᠻ	ᠬ	ᠭ	ᠰ	ᠱ	ᠲ	ᠳ	ᠴ		ᠵ		ᠶ	ᠷ	ᠾ
Latin	1931 - 1933	A/a	E/e	I/i	O/o	U/u	Ɵ/ɵ	Y/y	N/n	M/m	L/l	B/ʙ; V/v	P/p	F/f	K/k		G/g	S/s	Ş/ş	T/t	D/d	C/c	Ç/ç	Z/z	Ƶ/ƶ	J/j	R/r	H/h
Latin	1941	A/a	E/e	I/i	O/o	U/u	Ɵ/ɵ	Y/y	N/n	M/m	L/l	B/b; W/w	P/p	F/f	K/k	X/x	G/g; Q/q	S/s	Sh/sh	T/t	D/d	C/c	Ch/ch	Z/z	Zh/zh	J/j	R/r	H/h
Cyrillic		А, а	Э, э	И, и	О, о	У, у	Ө, ө	Ү, ү	Н, н	М, м	Л, л	Б, б; В, в	П, п	Ф, ф	К, к	Х, х	Г, г	С, с	Ш, ш	Т, т	Д, д	Ц, ц	Ч, ч	З, з	Ж, ж	Й, й	Р, р	Х, х

The unaspirated stops are often realized as voiced [b d dz dʒ ɡ/ɢ]. The non-nasal sonorants are often devoiced to [ɸ ɬ].

== Sample text ==
The following is a sample text written in the various Mongolian scripts, with translation to English.

Traditional script	ᠮᠠᠨ ᠤ ᠤᠯᠤᠰ ᠤᠨ ᠨᠡᠶᠢᠰᠯᠡᠯ ᠬᠣᠲᠠ ᠤᠯᠠᠭᠠᠨᠪᠠᠭᠠᠲᠤᠷ ᠪᠣᠯ ᠘᠐᠐᠐᠐ ᠰᠢᠬᠠᠮ ᠬᠦᠮᠦᠨ ᠲᠡᠢ᠂ ᠤᠯᠤᠰ ᠤᠨ ᠣᠯᠠᠨ ᠨᠡᠶᠢᠲᠡ ᠶᠢᠨ᠂ ᠠᠵᠤ ᠠᠬᠤᠢ ᠶᠢᠨ ᠲᠥᠪ ᠭᠠᠵᠠᠷ ᠤᠳ ᠣᠷᠣᠰᠢᠭᠰᠠᠨ ᠶᠡᠬᠡᠬᠡᠨ ᠣᠷᠣᠨ ᠪᠣᠯᠤᠨ᠎ᠠ᠃ ᠲᠤᠰ ᠤᠯᠤᠰ ᠤᠨ ᠳᠣᠲᠣᠷ᠎ᠠ ᠠᠴᠠ ᠭᠠᠷᠬᠤ ᠲᠦᠭᠦᠬᠡᠢ ᠵᠤᠶᠢᠯ ᠢ ᠪᠣᠯᠪᠠᠰᠤᠷᠠᠭᠤᠯᠬᠤ ᠠᠵᠤ ᠦᠢᠯᠡᠳᠪᠦᠷᠢ ᠶᠢᠨ ᠭᠠᠵᠠᠷ ᠤᠳ ᠢ ᠪᠠᠶᠢᠭᠤᠯᠬᠤ ᠨᠢ ᠴᠢᠬᠤᠯᠠ᠃
Latin script (1931-1933)	Manai ulasiin niislel koto Ulaanbaatar bol 80 000 şakam kyntei, ulasiin olon niitiin, aƶi akuin tɵb gazaruud oroşison jikeeken oron bolno. Tus ulasiin dotoroos garka tyykii zuiliig bolbosruulka aƶi yildberiin gazaruudiig baiguulka ni çukala.
Latin script (1941)	Manai ulasi'n ni'slel xoto Ula'nba'tar bol 80 000 shaxam xyntei, ulasi'n olon ni'ti'n, azhi axuin tɵb gazaru'd oroshison jixeexen oron bolno. Tus ulasi'n dotoro's garxa ty'xi' zuili'g bolbosru'lxa azhi jildberi'n gazaru'di'g baigu'lxa ni chuxala.
Cyrillic	Манай улсын нийслэл хот Улаанбаатар бол 80 000 шахам хүнтэй, улсын олон нийтийн, аж ахуйн төв газрууд оршисон ихээхэн орон болно. Тус улсын дотроос гарах түүхий зүйлийг боловсруулах аж үйлдвэрийн газруудыг байгуулах нь чухал.
Transliteration of Cyrillic	Manaj ulsyn nijslel hot Ulaanbaatar bol 80 000 šaham hüntej, ulsyn olon nijtijn, až ahujn töv gazruud oršison iheehen oron bolno. Tus ulsyn dotroos garah tüühij züjlijg bolovsruulah až üjldverijn gazruudyg bajguulakh n' čuhal.
IPA	[mɑnɛ ʊɬsiɴ niːsɬəɬ χɔtʰ ʊɮɑnpɑtʰər̥ pɔɬ nɑjəɴ mʲɑɴɢəɴ ɕɑχəm xuntʰe ǀ ʊɮsiɴ ɔɮəɴ niːtʰiɴ ǀ ɑt͡ɕ ɑχʊi̯ɴ tʰɵw ɢ̥ɑt͡srʊt ɔr̥ɕɪsɔɴ ixexəɴ ɔɾəɴ pɔɮnə ‖ tʰʊs ʊɬsiɴ tɔtʰrɔs ɢ̥ɑɾəχ tʰuːxi t͡sui̯ɮik pɔɮəw̜srʊɮəχ ɑt͡ɕ ui̯ɬtwəɾiɴ ɢ̥ɑt͡srʊtiɢ̥ pɛʁʊɮəχ͜ nʲ t͡ɕʰʊχəɬ ‖]
Translation	The capital city of our country, Ulaanbaatar, is a large city with nearly 80,000 people, where many public and economic centers of the country are located. It is important to establish industrial facilities within the country to process raw materials.

== Orthography ==
The orthography of the Mongolian Latin is based on the orthography of the Classical Mongolian script. It preserves short final vowels. It does not drop unstressed vowels in the closing syllables when the word is conjugated. The suffixes and inflections without long or i-coupled vowels are made open syllables ending with a vowel, which is harmonized with the stressed vowel. The rule for the vowel harmony for unstressed vowels is similar to that of the Mongolian Cyrillic. It does not use consonant combinations to denote new consonant sounds. For both of the version, letter "b" is used both in the beginning and in the middle of the word. Because it phonetically assimilates into sound [w], no ambiguity is caused.

== See also ==
- Latinisation in the Soviet Union
- Mongolian writing systems
  - Mongolian script
    - Galik alphabet
    - Todo alphabet
  - ʼPhags-pa script
    - Horizontal square script
  - Soyombo script
  - Mongolian Latin alphabet
    - SASM/GNC romanization § Mongolian
  - Mongolian Cyrillic alphabet
  - Mongolian transliteration of Chinese characters
    - Sino–Mongolian Transliterations
  - Mongolian Braille
- Mongolian Sign Language
- Mongolian name
