= Mongolian Cyrillic alphabet =

Writing system in Mongolia

Mongolian Cyrillic alphabet Монгол Кирилл үсэг
- Script type: Alphabet
- Period: 1940s–present
- Languages: Mongolian

Related scripts
- Parent systems: Egyptian hieroglyphs: Proto-Sinaitic alphabet; Phoenician alphabet; Greek alphabet (partly Glagolitic alphabet); Early Cyrillic alphabet; Russian alphabet; Mongolian Cyrillic alphabet

ISO 15924
- ISO 15924: Cyrl (220), Cyrillic

Unicode
- Unicode alias: Cyrillic
- Unicode range: subset of Cyrillic (U+0400...U+04FF)

The word 'Mongolia' ('Mongol') in Cyrillic script

The Mongolian Cyrillic alphabet (Mongolian: Монгол Кирилл үсэг, Mongol Kirill üseg or Кирилл цагаан толгой, Kirill tsagaan tolgoi) is the primary writing system used for the Mongolian language in modern Mongolia. It has a largely phonemic orthography, meaning that there is a greater degree of consistency in the representation of individual sounds, compared to the traditional Mongolian script, which is still used in the Inner Mongolia Autonomous Region of China, and is also co-official in the modern state of Mongolia.

== History ==
The Cyrillic alphabet is the most recent of the many writing systems that have been used for Mongolian. It uses the same characters as the Russian alphabet except for two additional characters: Өө ⟨ö⟩ and Үү ⟨ü⟩.

The alphabet was introduced in 1941, and due to strong Soviet influence, the Mongolian People's Republic formally adopted the script on January 1, 1946.

In the traditional Mongolian script, certain letters such as "t"/"d" "o"/"u" were frequently confused, and there were inconsistencies in letter formation at the beginning, middle, and end of words. The poor legibility between letters and the need to memorize the shapes of all the individual syllables in the language increased the difficulty of learning Mongolian. Additionally, structural characteristics of the traditional Mongolian script resulted in wider line spacing, occupying more space and increasing paper usage. For instance, in ancient books from the Qing Dynasty such as the Pentaglot Dictionary, the sections in Manchu and Mongolian occupy a larger portion of the page space than other language scripts.

Following the script reform, the movement to replace the old Mongolian script continued for over a decade. It took 21 years for Mongolia to achieve nationwide literacy, with the literacy rate increasing from around 2% to over 97%; this greatly facilitated the development of modern Mongolian culture.

After the Mongolian democratic revolution in 1990, the traditional Mongolian script was briefly considered to replace Cyrillic, but the plan was cancelled. However, the Mongolian script has become a compulsory subject in primary and secondary schooling and is slowly gaining in popularity.

In March 2020, the Mongolian government announced plans to use both Cyrillic and the traditional Mongolian script in official documents by 2025.

In China, the Cyrillic alphabet is also used by Chinese for learning the modern Mongolian language, as well as by some Mongols in Inner Mongolia to demonstrate their ethnic identity.

== Description ==
The Cyrillic alphabet used for Mongolian is as follows (with borrowed sounds in parentheses):

Position	Cyrillic	Braille	Name	IPA	ISO 9	Standard romanization (MNS 5217:2012)	Library of Congress	BGN/PCGN
1	Аа	⠁	а	a	а			
2	Бб	⠃	бэ	p, pʲ	b			
3	Вв	⠺	вэ	w̜, w̜ʲ	v			
4	Гг	⠛	гэ	ɡ, ɡʲ, ɢ	g			
5	Дд	⠙	дэ	t, tʲ	d			
6	Ее	⠑	е	ji~jɵ	e	ye	e	yö
7	Ёё	⠡	ё	jɔ	ë	yo	ë	yo
8	Жж	⠚	жэ	tʃ	ž	j	zh	j
9	Зз	⠵	зэ	ts	z			dz
10	Ии	⠊	и	i	i			
11	Йй	⠯	хагас и	i	j	i	ĭ	y
12	Кк	⠅	ка	kʰ, kʲʰ, x, xʲ	k			
13	Лл	⠇	эл	ɮ, ɮʲ	l			
14	Мм	⠍	эм	m, mʲ	m			
15	Нн	⠝	эн	n, nʲ, ŋ	n			
16	Оо	⠕	о	ɔ	o			
17	Өө	⠧	ө	ɵ~o	ô	ö		
18	Пп	⠏	пэ	pʰ, pʰʲ	p			
19	Рр	⠗	эр	r, rʲ	r			
20	Сс	⠎	эс	s	s			
21	Тт	⠞	тэ	tʰ, tʰʲ	t			
22	Уу	⠥	у	ʊ	u			
23	Үү	⠹	ү	u	ü			
24	Фф	⠋	фэ, фа, эф	f, pʰ	f			
25	Хх	⠓	хэ, ха	x, xʲ	h	kh		h
26	Цц	⠉	цэ	tsʰ	c	ts		
27	Чч	⠟	чэ	tʃʰ	č	ch		
28	Шш	⠱	ша, эш	ʃ	š	sh		
29	Щщ	⠭	ща, эщэ	(ʃ)	ŝ	sh	shch	
30	Ъъ	⠷	хатуугийн тэмдэг	none	ʺ	i	ı	'
31	Ыы	⠮	эр үгийн ы	i	y			ï
32	Ьь	⠾	зөөлний тэмдэг	ʲ	ʹ	i		ĭ
33	Ээ	⠪	э	e~i	è	e	ê	e
34	Юю	⠳	ю	jʊ, ju	û	yu	iu	yu/yü
35	Яя	⠫	я	ja	â	ya	ia	ya

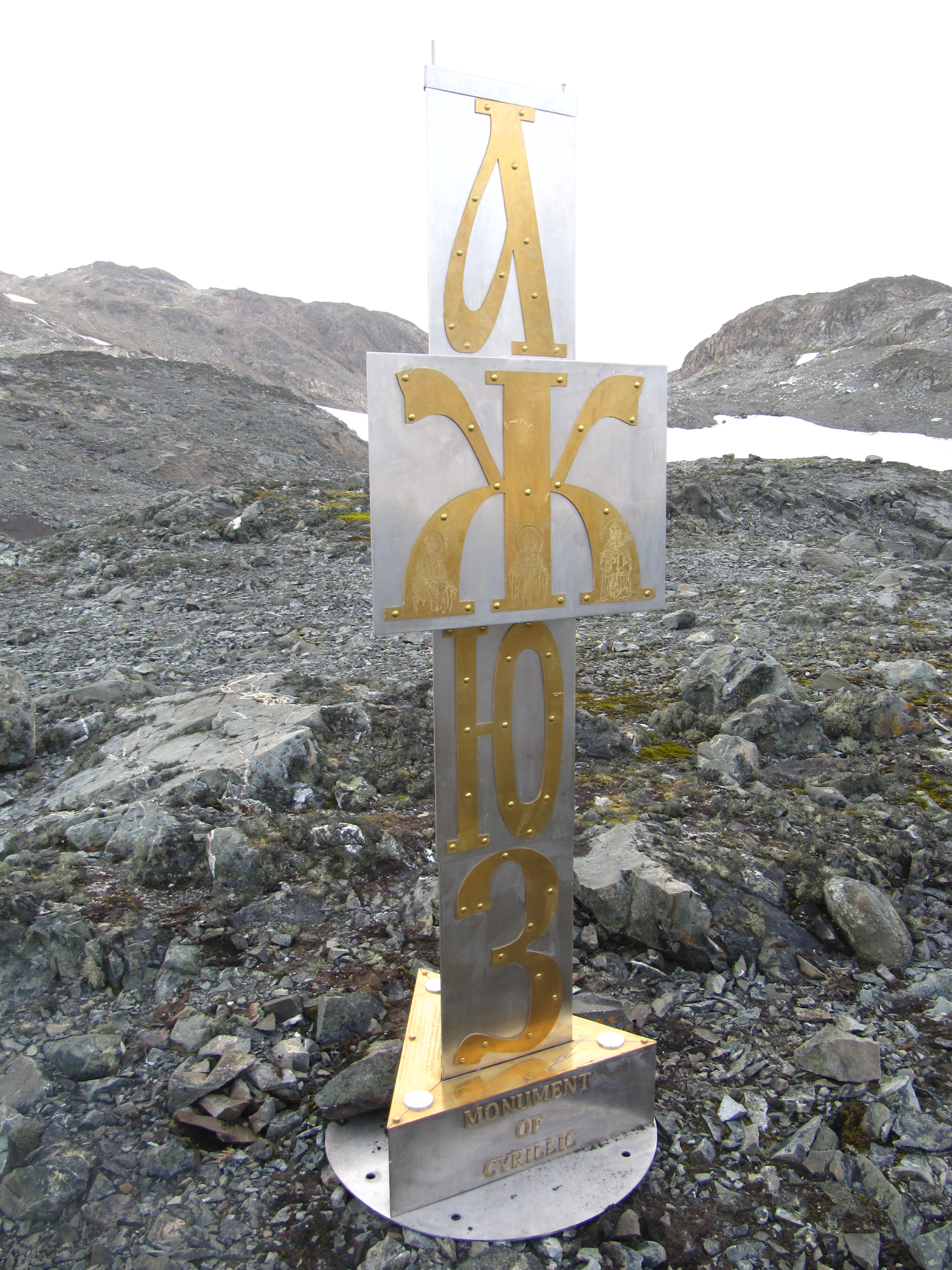
Cyrillic Script Monument erected under a joint Bulgarian-Mongolian project in Antarctica

Үү and Өө are sometimes also written as the Ukrainian letters Її (or Vv) and Єє respectively, when using Russian software or keyboards that do not support them.

Initial long vowels and non-initial full vowels are written with double vowel letters, while initial short vowels and non-initial epenthetic vowels are written with single vowel letters. Conversely, every vowel letter except у and ү can also represent schwa and zero in non-first syllables. Palatalisation is indicated by и (i), the soft sign ь (') or е (ye), ё (yo), я (ya) and ю (yu) after the palatalised consonant. These latter letters are pronounced without [j] in that position. Щ is never used in Mongolian and only used in Russian words containing the letter. It is pronounced identically to Ш, and is often omitted when teaching the Cyrillic alphabet. Sometimes, Russian loanwords with Щ will be spelled with Ш instead: борш, Хрушев. The difference between [e~i] might be dialectal, while the difference between ɵ~o is positional.

/ɡ/ and /ɢ/ are both indicated by the letter г ⟨g⟩, but the phonetic value of that letter is mostly predictable. In words with "front" (+ATR) vowels (see Mongolian phonology for details), it always means /ɡ/, because only /ɡ/ occurs in such words. In words with "back" (−ATR) vowels, it always means /ɢ/, except syllable-finally, where it means /ɡ/; to acquire the value of /ɢ/, it is written followed by a single mute syllable-final vowel letter. Similarly, a mute vowel is added to final н ⟨n⟩ to make it denote /n/ and not /ŋ/. ф (f) and к (k) are loan consonants and will often be adapted into the Mongolian sound system as [pʰ] and [x].

The original plan as at 10 October 1945 was to use э only at the beginning of words and in long vowel combinations (as is done in other languages written using Russian-based Cyrillic), дз for modern з, дж for modern ж, ии for modern ий and йө for modern е (to represent the "yö" sound at the beginning of words), but the alphabet was changed to its final form on 13 November. This usually affects when transcribing places and foreign names into Mongolian Cyrillic, such as Steve Jobs is spelled as Стив Жобс (rather than Стив Джобс) and Joe Biden is spelled as Жо Байден (rather than Джо Байден).

== Keyboard layout ==
The standard Mongolian Cyrillic keyboard layout for personal computers is as follows:

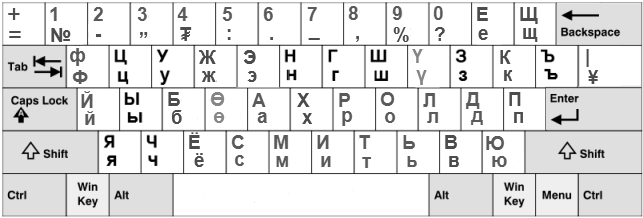

== See also ==
- Mongolian writing systems
  - Mongolian script
    - Galik alphabet
    - Todo alphabet
  - ʼPhags-pa script
    - Horizontal square script
  - Soyombo script
  - Mongolian Latin alphabet
    - SASM/GNC romanization § Mongolian
  - Mongolian transliteration of Chinese characters
    - Sino–Mongolian Transliterations
  - Mongolian Braille
- Mongolian Sign Language
- Mongolian name
