= Mongolian writing systems =

Writing systems devised for the Mongolian language

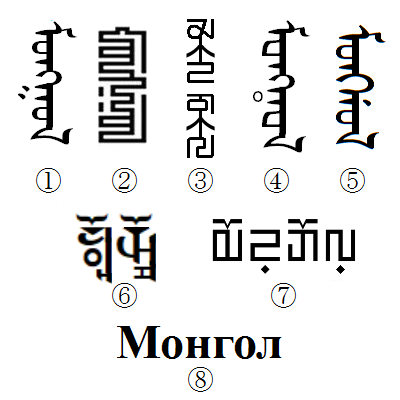
The word Mongol in various contemporary and historical scripts: 1. traditional, 2. folded, 3. 'Phags-pa, 4. Todo, 5. Manchu, 6. Soyombo, 7. horizontal square, 8. Cyrillic

Various Mongolian writing systems have been devised for the Mongolian language over the centuries, and from a variety of scripts. The oldest and native script, called simply the Mongolian script, has been the predominant script during most of Mongolian history, and is still in active use today in the Inner Mongolia region of China and has de facto use in Mongolia.

It has in turn spawned several alphabets, either as attempts to fix its perceived shortcomings, or to allow the notation of other languages, such as Chinese, Sanskrit and Tibetan. In the 20th century, Mongolia briefly switched to the Latin script, but then almost immediately replaced it with the modified Cyrillic alphabet because of its smaller discrepancy between written and spoken form, contributing to the success of the literacy campaign, which increased the literacy rate from 17.3% to 73.5% between 1941 and 1950. Nevertheless, Mongols living in Inner Mongolia as well as other parts of China continued to use alphabets based on the traditional Mongolian script.

In March 2020, the Government of Mongolia announced plans to use the traditional Mongolian script alongside the Cyrillic script in official documents (e.g. identity documents, academic certificates, birth certificates, marriage certificates, among others) as well as the State Great Khural by 2025, although the Cyrillic script could be used alone on an optional basis for less official writing.

== Precursors ==
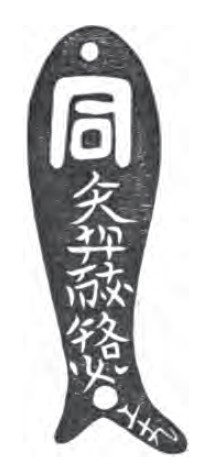
Bronze 'fish tally' with Khitan script

The Xianbei spoke a proto-Mongolic language and wrote down several pieces of literature in their language. They are believed to have used Chinese characters to phonetically represent Xianbei, like the Japanese system of Man'yōgana with Chinese, but all works written in Xianbei are now lost.

In 2019, with the emergence of new evidence through the analysis of the Brāhmī Bugut and Khüis Tolgoi, Rouran language was deciphered, and Rouran was spelled in Brahmi script.

The Khitan spoke another proto-Mongolic language and developed two scripts for writing it: Khitan large script and Khitan small script, logographic scripts derived from Chinese characters.

== Classic Mongolian scripts ==
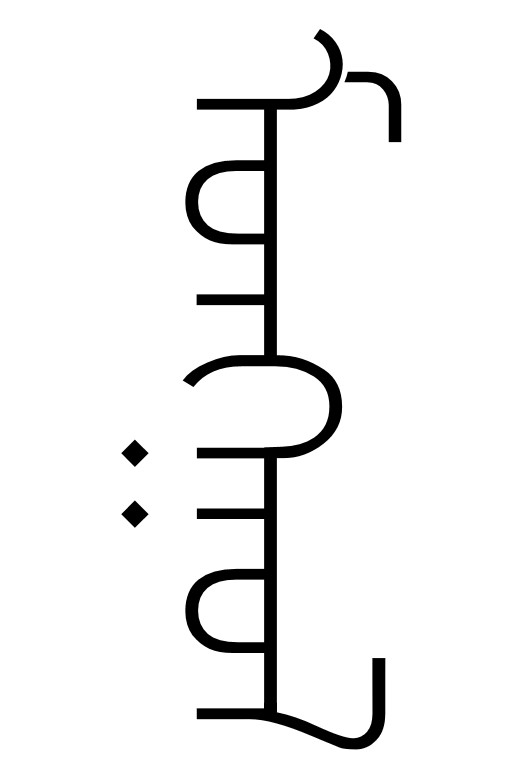
"Mongol" in Traditional Mongolian script.

=== Traditional alphabet ===
At the very beginning of the Mongol Empire, around 1204, Genghis Khan defeated the Naimans and captured a Uyghur scribe called Tata-tonga, who then adapted the Uyghur alphabet—a descendant of the Syriac alphabet, via Sogdian—to write Mongol. With only minor modifications, it is used in Inner Mongolia to this day. Its most salient feature is its vertical direction; it is the only vertical script still in use that is written from left to right. (All other vertical writing systems are written right to left.) This is because the Uyghurs rotated their script 90 degrees anticlockwise to emulate the Chinese writing system.

=== Folded alphabet ===
As a variant of the traditional script there exists a vertical square script (Босоо дөрвөлжин), also called folded script, used e.g. on the Mongolian banknotes. Folded script is usually used in stylized contexts, and is often associated with calligraphy.

=== Galik alphabet ===
In 1587, the translator and scholar Ayuush Güüsh created the Galik alphabet, inspired by Sonam Gyatso, the third Dalai Lama. It primarily added extra letters to transcribe Tibetan and Sanskrit terms in religious texts, and later also from Chinese and Russian. Later some of these letters were officially merged into traditional alphabet as a group named "Galig usug" to transcribe foreign words in modern use.

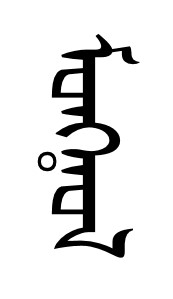
"Mongol" in Todo script.

=== Todo alphabet ===
In 1648, the Oirat Buddhist monk Zaya Pandita created this variation with the goal of bringing the written language closer to the actual Oirat pronunciation, and to make it easier to transcribe Tibetan and Sanskrit. The script was used by Kalmyks of Russia until 1924, when it was replaced by the Cyrillic alphabet. In Xinjiang, China, the Oirats still use it.

"Mongol" in Vagindra script.

=== Vagindra alphabet ===
Agvan Dorzhiev, a Russian Buryat monk, developed the Vagindra script in 1905 to write the Buryat dialect of Mongolian. It was briefly adopted before falling out of use.

== 'Phags-pa script (Square script) ==
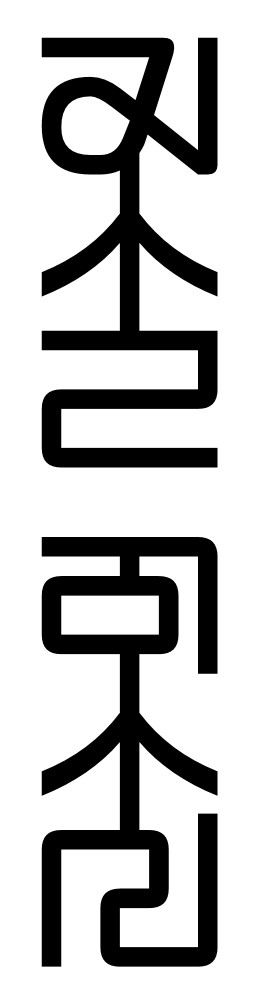
"Mongol" in Phags-pa script.

The traditional Mongolian alphabet is not a perfect fit for the Mongolian language, and it would be impractical to extend it to a language with a very different phonology like Chinese. Therefore, during the Yuan dynasty (c. 1269), Kublai Khan asked a Tibetan monk, Drogön Chögyal Phagpa, to design a new script for use by the whole empire. Phagpa extended his native Tibetan script to encompass Mongolian and Chinese; the result was known by several descriptive names, such as the Mongolian new script, but today is known as the 'Phags-pa script. The script did not receive wide acceptance and fell into disuse with the collapse of the Yuan dynasty in 1368. After this it was mainly used as a phonetic gloss for Mongols learning Chinese characters. However, scholars such as Gari Ledyard believe that in the meantime it was the source of some of the basic letters of the Korean hangul alphabet.

== Soyombo script ==
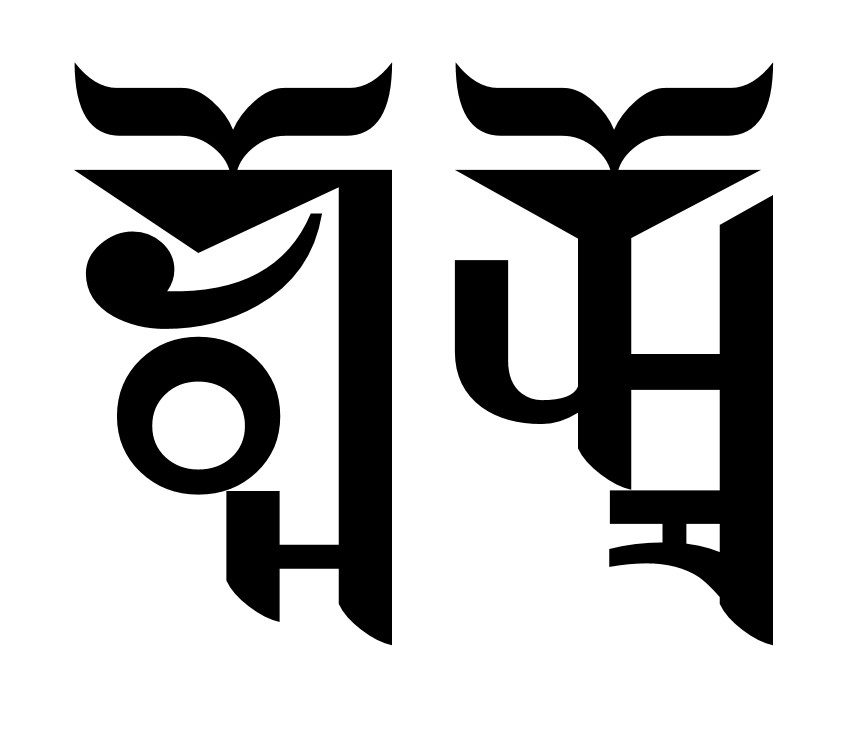
"Mongol" in Soyombo script.

The Soyombo script is an abugida created by the Mongolian monk and scholar Bogdo Zanabazar in the late 17th century, that can also be used to write Tibetan and Sanskrit. A special glyph in the script, the Soyombo symbol, became a national symbol of Mongolia, and has appeared on the national flag since 1921, and on the national coat of arms since 1992, as well as money, stamps, etc.

Zanabazar had created it for the translation of Buddhist texts from Sanskrit or Tibetan, and both he and his students used it extensively for that purpose. Aside from historical texts, it can usually be found in temple inscriptions. It also has some relevance to linguistic research, because it reflects certain developments in the Mongolian language, such as that of long vowels.

== Horizontal square script ==
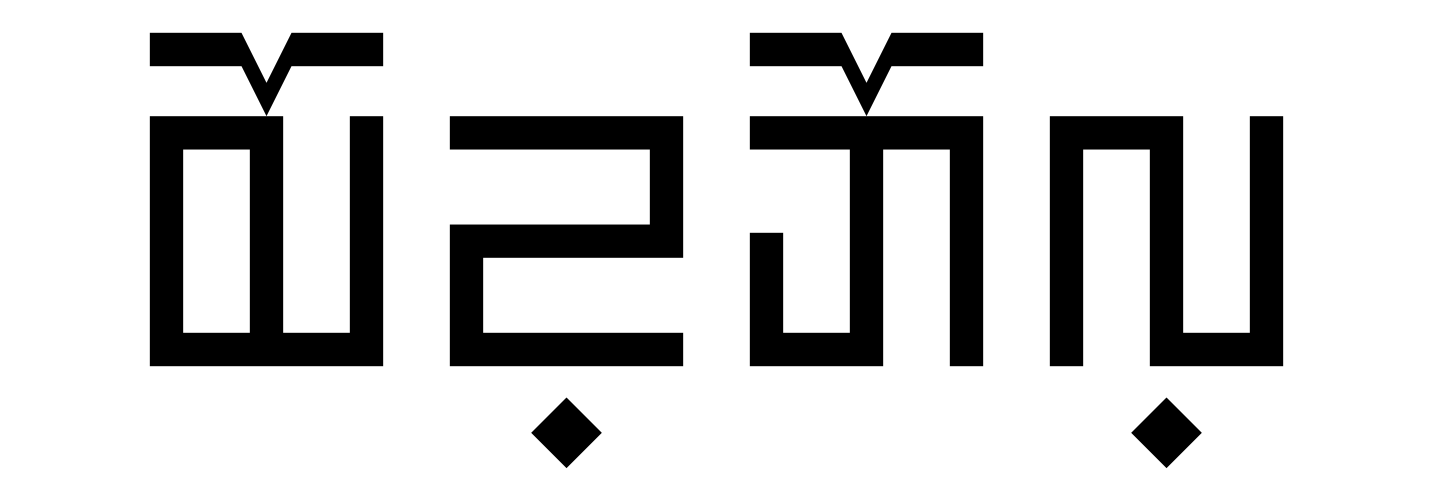
"Mongol" in Horizontal Square script.

At around the same time, Zanabazar also developed the horizontal square script (Хэвтээ дөрвөлжин), which was only rediscovered in 1801. The script's applications during the period of its use are not known. It was also largely based on the Tibetan alphabet, read left to right, and employed vowel diacritics above and below the consonant letters. Additionally, a dot was used below consonants to show that they were syllable-final.

Horizontal square script is included in the Unicode Standard under the name "Zanabazar Square". The Zanabazar Square block, comprising 72 characters, was added as part of Unicode version 10.0 in June 2017.

== Foreign scripts ==
Before the 13th century, foreign scripts such as the Uighur and the Tibetan scripts were used to write the Mongolian language. Even during the reign of the Mongol Empire, people in the conquered areas often wrote it in their local systems. In some cases it was transcribed phonetically using Chinese characters, as is the case with the only surviving copies of The Secret History of the Mongols. Subjects from the Middle East hired into administrative functions would also often use Perso-Arabic script to write their Mongolian language documents.

=== Latin script ===
On 1 February 1930, Mongolia officially adopted a Latin alphabet. On 25 March 1941, the decision was reversed. According to later official claims, the alphabet had turned out to have not been thought out well. It was said not to distinguish all the sounds of the Mongolian language, and was difficult to use. Using "y" as feminine "u" /u/, with additional feminine "o" ("ө") /ɵ/ and with additional consonants "ç" for "ch" /tʃ/, "ş" for "sh" /ʃ/ and ƶ for "zh" /dʒ/, it successfully served in printing books and newspapers. Many of the Latin letters (f, h, p, v) were even rarely used while q, w and x were completely excluded. The adoption of the Cyrillic script a short time later, almost simultaneously with most Soviet republics, suggests political reasons. In the advent of the Internet, people who use social networking services prefer typing in the Latin script for the ease of typing compared to the Cyrillic script, using the orthography introduced in 1939.

=== Cyrillic script ===
"Mongol" in Cyrillic script

The most recent Mongolian alphabet is based on the Cyrillic script, more specifically the Russian alphabet plus the letters, Өө Öö and Үү Üü. It was introduced in the 1940s and has been in use as the official writing system of Mongolia ever since.

In March 2020, the Government of Mongolia announced plans to use the traditional Mongolian script alongside Cyrillic in official documents starting from 2025.

== See also ==
- SASM/GNC romanization § Mongolian
- Mongolian transliteration of Chinese characters
  - Sino–Mongolian Transliterations
- Mongolian Braille
- Mongolian Sign Language
- Mongolian name
