= Kirakos Gandzaketsi's list of Mongolian words =

Kirakos Gandzaketsi's list of Mongolian words is a list of 13th-century Mongolian words compiled by the Armenian historian Kirakos Gandzaketsi, who was taken prisoner by the Mongols in the spring of 1236.

== Kirakos Gandzaketsi ==
While imprisoned, Kirakos learned the Mongolian language. He later compiled his knowledge of it into a list of 55 words with their corresponding Armenian meanings. Kirakos escaped captivity in the summer of 1236 and returned to the town of Getik.

== List ==
=== Animals ===
Gandzaketsi's list	Translation	Mongolian script	modern Mongolian pronunciation
burkui-gush	eagle	bürgüd, qosiγu (beak)	bürged, khoshuu (beak)
china	wolf	činu-a	chono
goyna	sheep	qoni	khoni
gurgan	lamb	quraγan	khurgan
iman	goat	imaɣ-a	yamaa
honkan	fox	ünegen	üneg, ünegen
kokuchin	pigeon	köküge (cuckoo)	khökhöö (cuckoo)
losa	mule	laγusa	luus
mori	horse	mori	mori
nohoi	dog	noqai	nohoi
okar	bull	üker	ükher
tahiea	chicken	taqiy-a	tahia
taman	camel	temegen	temeen
tula	rabbit	taulai	tuulai
unen	cow	üniy-e	ünee

=== Time ===
Gandzaketsi's list	Translation	Mongolian script	modern Mongolian pronunciation
otur	light	edür (day)	ödör (day)
suiyni	night	söni	shönö

=== Personal relations ===
Gandzaketsi's list	Translation	Mongolian script	modern Mongolian pronunciation
aga	brother	aq-a (older brother)	akh (older brother)
aka	mother	eke	ekh
akatchi	sister	egechi	egch
apdzhi	female	abǰiy-a	avzhaa (address to a female shaman)
haran	man	aran	aran
barakhur	satan	baruγar (grim)	bargar (grim)
bitikchi	scribe	bičigči	bichigch
ere	man	er-e (man)	er (man)
elep	satan	yelbi (witchcraft)	ilbe (witchcraft)
eme	female	em-e	em
echka	father	echige	etseg
irkan	country	irgen	irgen
noin	сhief	noyan	noyon
tangri	god	kök tngri (lit. blue sky, heaven god): tngri (heaven)	tenger (heaven)

=== Body parts ===
Gandzaketsi's list	Translation	Mongolian script	modern Mongolian pronunciation
aman	mouth	aman	am, aman
chikin	ear	čikin	chikh, chikhen
nidun	eye	nidün	nüd, nüden
niur	face	niγur	nüür
sakhal	beard	saqal	sakhal
sidun	tooth	sidün	shüd, shüden
tiron	head	terigün	tergüün
yuz	face	üǰ – a root found in words such as üǰekü (to look), üǰegülküü (to show), and üǰemǰi (appearance)	üzekh (to look), üzüülekh (to show), and üzemzh (appearance)

=== Natural objects ===
Gandzaketsi's list	Translation	Mongolian script	modern Mongolian pronunciation
goga	sky	kök tngri (lit. blue sky, heaven god): köke (blue)	khökh (blue)
hutut	stars	"-d" is a plural suffix=odu, odud for plural	od, odod
naur	sea	naγur (lake)	nuur (lake)
naran	sun	naran	nar, naran
moran	river	mören	mörön
sara	moon	sara	sar
sarga	stars	sirg-a naran	sharga nar (lit. yellow sun), the idiom in sentences such as toonyn sharga nar: the sunbeam clearly streaming in a ger (house) through the toonto (a chimney)
tangyz	sea	tenggis	tengis
usun	water	usun	us, usan

=== Food ===
Gandzaketsi's list	Translation	Mongolian script	modern Mongolian pronunciation
tarasu	wine	darasu	dars

=== Weaponry ===
Gandzaketsi's list	Translation	Mongolian script	modern Mongolian pronunciation
ioltu	sword	ildü	ild
nymu	bow	numu	num
symu	arrow	sumu	sum
