= Mongolian Braille =

Braille alphabet of the Mongolian language

- Script type: Alphabet
- Print basis: Mongolian Cyrillic alphabet
- Languages: Mongolian

Related scripts
- Parent systems: Braille: Russian Braille; Mongolian Braille

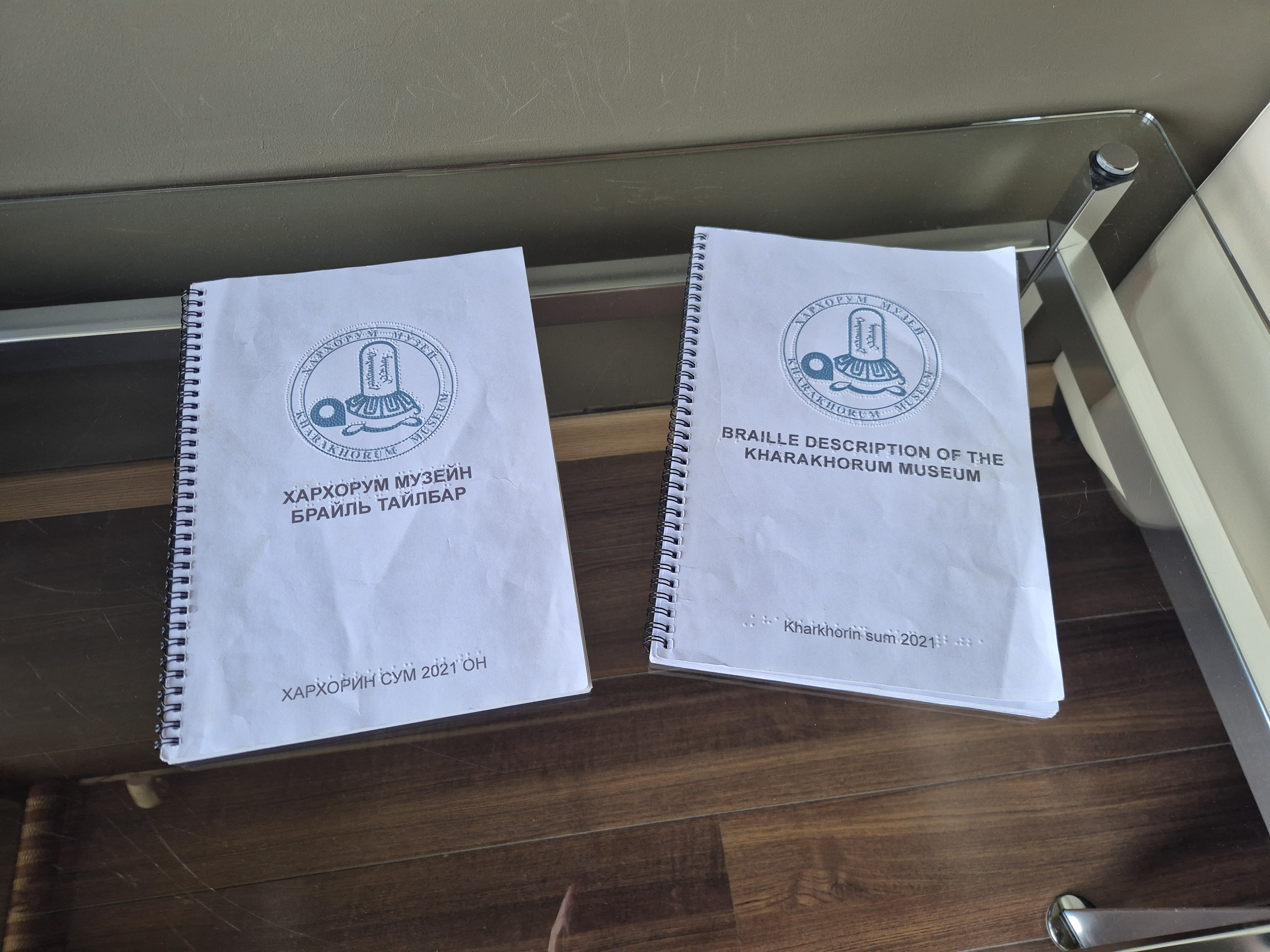
Mongolian braille book at Kharakhorum Museum, Kharkhorin

Mongolian Braille is the braille alphabet used for the Mongolian language in Mongolia. It is based on Russian Braille, with two additional letters for print letters found in the Mongolian Cyrillic alphabet.

== Alphabet ==
The printed Mongolian Cyrillic alphabet has all the letters of printed Russian, though some are only used in loan words, plus the letters ө, ү.

Print	а a	б b	в v	г g	д d	е ye	ё yo	ж j	з dz	и i	й y	к k
Braille	⠁ (braille pattern dots-1)	⠃ (braille pattern dots-12)	⠺ (braille pattern dots-2456)	⠛ (braille pattern dots-1245)	⠙ (braille pattern dots-145)	⠑ (braille pattern dots-15)	⠡ (braille pattern dots-16)	⠚ (braille pattern dots-245)	⠵ (braille pattern dots-1356)	⠊ (braille pattern dots-24)	⠯ (braille pattern dots-12346)	⠅ (braille pattern dots-13)
Print	л l	м m	н n	о o	ө ö	п p	р r	с s	т t	у u	ү ü	ф f
Braille	⠇ (braille pattern dots-123)	⠍ (braille pattern dots-134)	⠝ (braille pattern dots-1345)	⠕ (braille pattern dots-135)	⠧ (braille pattern dots-1236)	⠏ (braille pattern dots-1234)	⠗ (braille pattern dots-1235)	⠎ (braille pattern dots-234)	⠞ (braille pattern dots-2345)	⠥ (braille pattern dots-136)	⠹ (braille pattern dots-1456)	⠋ (braille pattern dots-124)
Print	х kh	ц ts	ч ch	ш sh	щ shch	ъ ”	ы i	ь ’	э e	ю yu	я ya	
Braille	⠓ (braille pattern dots-125)	⠉ (braille pattern dots-14)	⠟ (braille pattern dots-12345)	⠱ (braille pattern dots-156)	⠭ (braille pattern dots-1346)	⠷ (braille pattern dots-12356)	⠮ (braille pattern dots-2346)	⠾ (braille pattern dots-23456)	⠪ (braille pattern dots-246)	⠳ (braille pattern dots-1256)	⠫ (braille pattern dots-1246)	⠀ (braille pattern blank)

The non-Russian letters ө, ү, have the forms of two obsolete letters of Russian Braille. The Mongolian vowel ө (ö) is coincidentally similar in print to the old Russian consonant ѳ (th), and it takes the latter's braille assignment, ⠧; the Mongolian vowel ү (ü) takes the assignment of the old Russian vowel yat, ⠹.

== Punctuation ==
Print	,	.	?	!
Braille	⠂ (braille pattern dots-2)	⠲ (braille pattern dots-256)	⠢ (braille pattern dots-26)	⠖ (braille pattern dots-235)

== See also ==
- Mongolian Cyrillic alphabet, for the braille alphabet aligned with Cyrillic
