= Mongolian Sign Language =

Deaf sign language of Mongolia

- Монгол дохионы хэл
- Native to: Mongolia
- Native speakers: 16,000 (2021)
- Language family: French Sign?: Austro-Hungarian Sign?; Russian Sign Language?; Mongolian Sign Language

Language codes
- ISO 639-3: msr
- Glottolog: mong1264

Mongolian Sign Language (MSL; Mongolian: Монгол дохионы хэл, romanized: Mongol dokhiony khel) is a sign language used in Mongolia. Ethnologue estimates that there are between 9,000 and 15,000 deaf signers in Mongolia as of 2019.

A school for the deaf was established in Mongolia in 1964 with assistance from the Soviet Union. This resulted in many similarities between MSL and Russian Sign Language (RSL) for a time, but the two languages have since developed to be separate and distinct.

Linda Ball, a Peace Corps volunteer in Mongolia, is believed to have created the first dictionary of MSL in 1995. In 2007, another MSL dictionary with 3,000 entries was published by Mongolia's Ministry of Education, Culture, and Science with assistance from UNESCO.

== Sources ==
- "Now That's a Good Sign!" (PDF), Peace Corps Times (1), January 1995
- Torigoe, Takashi (April 2008), モンゴルのろう教育・現地調査報告, 途上国における特別支援教育開発の国際協力に関する研究 [Deaf education in Mongolia: Report of fieldwork] (PDF), 科学研究費補助金研究成果報告書, pp. 285–305, archived from the original (PDF) on 15 August 2011
