= Mongolian transliteration of Chinese characters =

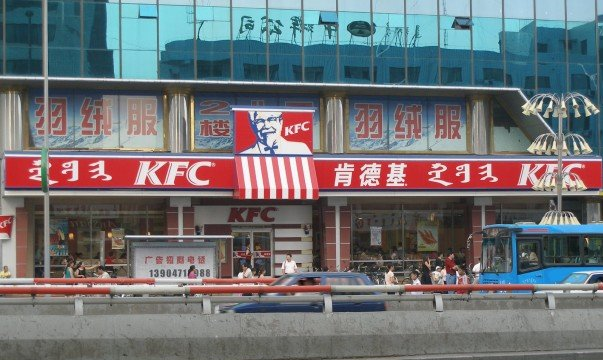
A KFC store in Hohhot showing the Mongolian transliteration ᠻᠧᠨ ᠳ᠋ᠧ ᠵᠢᠢ kēn dē jii for Standard Chinese 肯德基 kěn dé jī ("Kentucky").

Mongolian transliteration of Chinese characters is a system of transliterating the Standard Chinese pinyin readings of Chinese characters using the traditional Mongolian script that is used in Inner Mongolia, China.

Vowel	a					e						o	
Final	a	ai	ao	an	ang	e	ei	er	en	eng	o	ou	ong
Initial	a 阿 ᠠa	ai 哀 ᠠᠢai	ao 熬 ᠣᠣoo	an 安 ᠠᠨan	ang 肮 ᠠᠩang	e 額 ᠧe	ei 欸 ᠧᠢei	er 儿 ᠡᠯel	en 恩 ᠧᠨen	eng 鞥 ᠧᠩeng	o 喔 ᠣᠢᠸᠧöwe	ou 欧 ᠡᠸᠤeu	ong ᠥᠩöng
ᠪ b	ba 巴 ᠪᠠ᠋ba	bai 拜 ᠪᠠᠢbai	bao 包 ᠪᠣᠣboo	ban 班 ᠪᠠᠨban	bang 邦 ᠪᠠᠩbang		bei 杯 ᠪᠧᠢbei		ben 奔 ᠪᠧᠨben	beng 崩 ᠪᠧᠩbeng	bo 玻 ᠪᠣᠢᠸᠧböwe		
ᠫ p	pa 怕 ᠫᠠ᠋pa	pai 拍 ᠫᠠᠢpai	pao 抛 ᠫᠣᠣpoo	pan 潘 ᠫᠠᠨpan	pang 旁 ᠫᠠᠩpang		pei 胚 ᠫᠧᠢpei		pen 噴 ᠫᠧᠨpen	peng 烹 ᠫᠧᠩpeng	po 潑 ᠫᠣᠢᠸᠧpöwe	pou 剖 ᠫᠸᠤpeu	
ᠮ m	ma 媽 ᠮᠠma	mai 埋 ᠮᠠᠢmai	mao 猫 ᠮᠣᠣmoo	man 曼 ᠮᠠᠨman	mang 忙 ᠮᠠᠩmang		mei 眉 ᠮᠧᠢmei		men 悶 ᠮᠧᠨmen	meng 蒙 ᠮᠧᠩmeng	mo 墨 ᠮᠣᠢᠸᠧmöwe	mou 謀 ᠮᠸᠤmeu	
ᠹ f	fa 发 ᠹᠠ᠋fa			fan 番 ᠹᠠᠨfan	fang 方 ᠹᠠᠩfang		fei 非 ᠹᠧᠢfei		fen 分 ᠹᠧᠨfen	feng 風 ᠹᠧᠩfeng	fo 佛 ᠹᠣᠢᠸᠧföwe	fou 否 ᠹᠸᠤfeu	
ᠳ d	da 大 ᠳ᠋ᠠda	dai 呆 ᠳ᠋ᠠᠢdai	dao 刀 ᠳ᠋ᠣᠣdoo	dan 单 ᠳ᠋ᠠᠨdan	dang 当 ᠳ᠋ᠠᠩdang	de 德 ᠳ᠋ᠸde	dei 得 ᠳ᠋ᠸᠢdei		den 扽 ᠳ᠋ᠸᠨden	deng 登 ᠳ᠋ᠸᠩdeng		dou 斗 ᠳ᠋ᠸᠤdeu	dong 東 ᠳ᠋ᠥᠩdöng
ᠲ t	ta 他 ᠲᠠta	tai 胎 ᠲᠠᠢtai	tao 滔 ᠲᠣᠣtoo	tan 灘 ᠲᠠᠨtan	tang 湯 ᠲᠠᠩtang	te 特 ᠲᠸte				teng 騰 ᠲᠸᠩteng		tou 偷 ᠲᠸᠤteu	tong 通 ᠲᠥᠩtöng
ᠨ n	na 那 ᠨᠠna	nai 乃 ᠨᠠᠢnai	nao 閙 ᠨᠣᠣnoo	nan 男 ᠨᠠᠨnan	nang 嚢 ᠨᠠᠩnang	ne 納 ᠨᠸne	nei 内 ᠨᠸᠢnei		nen 恁 ᠨᠸᠨnen	neng 能 ᠨᠸᠩneng		nou 耨 ᠨᠸᠤneu	nong 農 ᠨᠥᠩnöng
ᠯ l	la 拉 ᠯᠠla	lai 頼 ᠯᠠᠢlai	lao 撈 ᠯᠣᠣloo	lan 蘭 ᠯᠠᠨlan	lang 郎 ᠯᠠᠩlang	le 勒 ᠯᠸle	lei 類 ᠯᠸᠢlei			leng 冷 ᠯᠸᠩleng		lou 楼 ᠯᠸᠤleu	long 龙 ᠯᠥᠩlöng
ᠭ ᠺ g	ga 嗄 ᠭᠠγa	gai 該 ᠭᠠᠢγai	gao 高 ᠭᠣᠣγoo	gan 干 ᠭᠠᠨγan	gang 剛 ᠭᠠᠩγang	ge 哥 ᠺᠸge	gei 給 ᠺᠸᠢgei		gen 根 ᠺᠸᠨgen	geng 庚 ᠺᠸᠩgeng		gou 勾 ᠺᠸᠤgeu	gong 工 ᠺᠥᠩgöng
ᠻ k	ka 咖 ᠻᠠ᠋ka	kai 開 ᠻᠠᠢkai	kao 考 ᠻᠣᠣkoo	kan 刊 ᠻᠠᠨkan	kang 康 ᠻᠠᠩkang	ke 科 ᠻᠸke			ken 肯 ᠻᠸᠨken	keng 坑 ᠻᠸᠩkeng		kou 摳 ᠻᠸᠤkeu	kong 空 ᠻᠥᠩköng
ᠬ ᠾ h	ha 哈 ᠬᠠqa	hai 孩 ᠬᠠᠢqai	hao 蒿 ᠬᠣᠣqoo	han 鼾 ᠬᠠᠨqan	hang 航 ᠬᠠᠩqang	he 喝 ᠾᠸhe	hei 黑 ᠾᠸᠢhei		hen 痕 ᠾᠸᠨhen	heng 亨 ᠾᠸᠩheng		hou 喉 ᠾᠸᠤheu	hong 烘 ᠾᠣᠩhong
ᡁᠢ zh	zha 渣 ᠵᠠja	zhai 斋 ᠵᠠᠢjai	zhao 招 ᠵᠣᠣjoo	zhan 毡 ᠵᠠᠨjan	zhang 張 ᠵᠠᠩjang	zhe 遮 ᠵᠸje	zhei 这 ᠵᠸᠢjei		zhen 真 ᠵᠧᠨjen	zheng 争 ᠵᠧᠩjeng		zhou 周 ᠵᠸᠤjeu	zhong 中 ᠵᠥᠩjöng
ᡂᠢ ch	cha 插 ᠴᠠča	chai 柴 ᠴᠠᠢčai	chao 超 ᠴᠣᠣčoo	chan 搀 ᠴᠠᠨčan	chang 昌 ᠴᠠᠩčang	che 車 ᠴᠸče			chen 塵 ᠴᠧᠨčen	cheng 撑 ᠴᠧᠩčeng		chou 抽 ᠴᠸᠤčeu	chong 充 ᠵᠥᠩčöng
ᠱᠢsh	sha 沙 ᠱᠠša	shai 篩 ᠱᠠᠢšai	shao 烧 ᠱᠣᠣšoo	shan 山 ᠱᠠᠨšan	shang 商 ᠱᠠᠩšang	she 賒 ᠱᠧše	shei 誰 ᠱᠧᠢšei		shen 申 ᠱᠧᠨšen	sheng 生 ᠱᠧᠩšeng		shou 収 ᠱᠸᠤšeu	
ᠿ ř			rao 繞 ᠿᠣᠣřoo	ran 然 ᠿᠠᠨřan	rang 嚷 ᠿᠠᠩřang	re 熱 ᠿᠧře			ren 人 ᠿᠧᠨřen	reng 扔 ᠿᠧᠩřeng		rou 肉 ᠿᠸᠤřeu	rong 容 ᠿᠥᠩřöng
ᠽz	za 匝 ᠽᠠza	zai 災 ᠽᠢzai	zao 糟 ᠽᠣᠣzoo	zan 簪 ᠽᠠᠨzan	zang 臟 ᠽᠠᠩzang	ze 則 ᠽᠧze	zei 賊 ᠽᠧᠢzei		zen 怎 ᠽᠧᠨzen	zeng 增 ᠽᠧᠩzeng		zou 鄒 ᠽᠸᠤzeu	zong 宗 ᠽᠥᠩzöng
ᠼc	ca 擦 ᠼᠠca	cai 才 ᠼᠢcai	cao 操 ᠼᠣᠣcoo	can 餐 ᠼᠠᠨcan	cang 倉 ᠼᠠᠩcang	ce 策 ᠼᠧce			cen 岑 ᠼᠧᠨcen	ceng 層 ᠼᠸᠩceng		cou 湊 ᠼᠸᠤceu	cong 聪 ᠼᠥᠩcöng
ᠰs	sa 撒 ᠰᠠsa	sai 腮 ᠰᠢsai	sao 骚 ᠰᠣᠣsoo	san 三 ᠰᠠᠨsan	sang 桑 ᠰᠠᠩsang	se 色 ᠰᠧse			sen 森 ᠰᠧᠨsen	seng 僧 ᠰᠸᠩseng		sou 捜 ᠰᠸᠤseu	song 松 ᠰᠥᠩsöng

Vowel	i									
Final	i	ia	iao	ie	iu	ian	in	iang	ing	iong
Initial	yi 衣 ᠢ᠂ᠶᠢ i, yi	ya 呀 ᠶᠠ ya	yao 腰 ᠶᠣᠣ yoo	ye 耶 ᠶᠸ ye	you 尤 ᠢᠤ᠂ᠶᠸᠤ iu, yeu	yan 烟 ᠶᠠᠨ yan	yin 因 ᠢᠨ᠂ᠶᠢᠨ in, yin	yang 央 ᠶᠠᠩ yang	ying 英 ᠢᠩ᠂ᠶᠢᠩ ing, ying	yong 雍 ᠶᠥᠩ yöng
ᠪ b	bi 逼 ᠪᠢ bi		biao 標 ᠪᠢᠶᠣᠣ biyuu	bie 別 ᠪᠢᠶᠸ biye		bian 边 ᠪᠢᠶᠠᠨ biyan	bin 賓 ᠪᠢᠨ bin		bing 兵 ᠪᠢᠩ bing	
ᠫ p	pi 批 ᠫᠢ pi		piao 飄 ᠫᠢᠶᠣᠣ piyuu	pie 撇 ᠫᠢᠶᠸ piye		pian 偏 ᠫᠢᠶᠠᠨ piyan	pin 拼 ᠫᠢᠨ pin		ping 平 ᠫᠢᠩ ping	
ᠮ m	mi 咪 ᠮᠢ mi		miao 苗 ᠮᠢᠶᠣᠣ miyuu	mie 滅 ᠮᠢᠶᠸ miye	miu 謬 ᠮᠢᠤ miu	mian 面 ᠮᠢᠶᠠᠨ miyan	min 民 ᠮᠢᠨ min		ming 明 ᠮᠢᠩ ming	
ᠳ d	di 抵 ᠳ᠋ᠢ di		diao 雕 ᠳ᠋ᠢᠶᠣᠣ diyuu	die 爹 ᠳ᠋ᠢᠶᠸ diye	diu 丟 ᠳ᠋ᠢᠤ diu	dian 顛 ᠳ᠋ᠢᠶᠠᠨ diyan			ding 丁 ᠳ᠋ᠢᠩ ding	
ᠲ t	ti 梯 ᠲᠢ ti		tiao 挑 ᠲᠢᠶᠣᠣ tiyuu	tie 貼 ᠲᠢᠶᠸ tiye		tian 天 ᠲᠢᠶᠠᠨ tiyan			ting 听 ᠲᠢᠩ ting	
ᠨ n	ni 尼 ᠨᠢ ni		niao 鳥 ᠨᠢᠶᠣᠣ niyuu	nie 捏 ᠨᠢᠶᠸ niye	niu 牛 ᠨᠢᠤ niu	nian 年 ᠨᠢᠶᠠᠨ niyan	nin 您 ᠨᠢᠨ nin	niang 娘 ᠨᠢᠶᠠᠩ niyang	ning 寧 ᠨᠢᠩ ning	
ᠯ l	li 哩 ᠯᠢ li	lia 倆 ᠯᠢᠶᠠ liya	liao 撩 ᠯᠢᠶᠣᠣ liyuu	lie 列 ᠯᠢᠶᠸ liye	liu 溜 ᠯᠢᠤ liu	lian 連 ᠯᠢᠶᠠᠨ liyan	lin 林 ᠯᠢᠨ lin	liang 良 ᠯᠢᠶᠠᠩ liyang	ling 令 ᠯᠢᠩ ling	
ᠵ j	ji 基 ᠵᠢ᠂ᠵᠢᠢ ji, jii	jia 家 ᠵᠢᠶᠠ jiya	jiao 交 ᠵᠢᠶᠣᠣ jiyuu	jie 街 ᠵᠢᠶᠸ jiye	jiu 鳩 ᠵᠢᠤ jiu	jian 兼 ᠵᠢᠶᠠᠨ jiyan	jin 今 ᠵᠢᠨ jin	jiang 江 ᠵᠢᠶᠠᠩ jiyang	jing 京 ᠵᠢᠩ jing	jiong 迥 ᠵᠢᠶᠥᠩ jiyüng
ᠴ q	qi 欺 ᠴᠢ či	qia 恰 ᠴᠢᠶᠠ čiya	qiao 敲 ᠴᠢᠶᠣᠣ čiyuu	qie 切 ᠴᠢᠶᠸ čiye	qiu 秋 ᠴᠢᠤ čiu	qian 牽 ᠴᠢᠶᠠᠨ čiyan	qin 親 ᠴᠢᠨ čin	qiang 腔 ᠴᠢᠶᠠᠩ čiyang	qing 青 ᠴᠢᠩ čing	qiong 窮 ᠴᠢᠶᠥᠩ čiyüng
ᠱ x	xi 希 ᠰᠢ si	xia 虾 ᠰᠢᠶᠠ siya	xiao 消 ᠰᠢᠶᠣᠣ siyuu	xie 歇 ᠰᠢᠶᠸ siye	xiu 休 ᠰᠢᠤ siu	xian 先 ᠰᠢᠶᠠᠨ siyan	xin 欣 ᠰᠢᠨ sin	xiang 香 ᠰᠢᠶᠠᠩ siyang	xing 星 ᠰᠢᠩ sing	xiong 凶 ᠰᠢᠶᠥᠩ siyüng
ᡁᠢ zh	zhi 知 ᡁᠢ zhi									
ᡂᠢ ch	chi 蚩 ᡂᠢ chi									
ᠱᠢsh	shi 詩 ᠱᠢ shi									
ᠿ ř	ri 日 ᠿᠢ ři									
ᠽz	zi 資 ᠽᠢ zi									
ᠼc	ci 雌 ᠼᠢ ci									
ᠰs	si 思 ᠰᠸ se									

Vowel	u									ü			
Final	u	ua	uo	uai	ui	uan	un	uang	ueng	ü	üe	üan	ün
Initial	wu 烏 ᠡᠤeu	wa 哇 ᠸᠠwa	wo 窩 ᠸᠸwe	wai 歪 ᠸᠠᠢwai	wei 威 ᠸᠸᠢwwi	wan 湾 ᠸᠠᠨwan	wen 温 ᠸᠸᠨwen	wang 汪 ᠸᠠᠩwang	weng 翁 ᠸᠸᠩweng	yu 迂 ᠢᠤᠢiui	yue 月 ᠶᠥᠸᠡᠢyüwei	yuan 冤 ᠶᠤᠸᠠᠨyuwan	yun 暈 ᠶᠦᠨyün
ᠪ b	bu 不 ᠪᠤbo												
ᠫ p	pu 扑 ᠫᠤpo												
ᠮ m	mu 木 ᠮᠥmo												
ᠹ f	fu 夫 ᠹᠣfo												
ᠳ d	du 都 ᠳ᠋ᠥdo		duo 多 ᠳ᠋ᠥᠸᠸdöwe		dui 堆 ᠳ᠋ᠥᠢdöi	duan 端 ᠳ᠋ᠤᠸᠠᠨduwan	dun 敦 ᠳ᠋ᠥᠨdön						
ᠲ t	tu 禿 ᠲᠥto		tuo 拖 ᠲᠥᠸᠸtöwe		tui 推 ᠲᠥᠢtöi	tuan 团 ᠲᠤᠸᠠᠨtuwan	tun 呑 ᠲᠥᠨtön						
ᠨ n	nu 奴 ᠨᠥno		nuo 糯 ᠨᠥᠸᠸnöwe			nuan 暖 ᠨᠤᠸᠠᠨnuwan	nun 嫩 ᠨᠥᠨnön			nü 女 ᠨᠢᠤᠢniui	nüe 虐 ᠨᠢᠤᠸᠸᠢniuwei		
ᠯ l	lu 炉 ᠯᠥlo		luo 羅 ᠯᠥᠸᠸlöwe			luan 乱 ᠯᠤᠸᠠᠨluwan	lun 掄 ᠯᠥᠨlön			lü 呂 ᠯᠢᠤᠢliui	lüe 略 ᠯᠢᠤᠸᠸᠢliuwei		
ᠭ ᠺ g	gu 姑 ᠺᠣgo	gua 瓜 ᠭᠤᠸᠠγuwa	guo 鍋 ᠺᠥᠸᠸgöwe	guai 乖 ᠭᠤᠸᠠᠢγuwai	gui 規 ᠺᠥᠢgüi	guan 官 ᠭᠤᠸᠠᠨγuwan	gun 袞 ᠺᠥᠨgön	guang 光 ᠭᠤᠸᠠᠩγuwang					
ᠻ k	ku 枯 ᠻᠣko	kua 夸 ᠻᠤᠸᠠkuwa	kuo 闊 ᠻᠥᠸᠸköwe	kuai 快 ᠻᠤᠸᠠᠢkuwai	kui 虧 ᠻᠥᠢküi	kuan 貫 ᠻᠤᠸᠠᠨkuwan	kun 昆 ᠻᠥᠨkön	kuang 匡 ᠻᠤᠸᠠᠩkuwang					
ᠬ ᠾ h	hu 呼 ᠬᠣqo	hua 花 ᠬᠤᠸᠠquwa	huo 貨 ᠾᠥᠸᠸhöwe	huai 坏 ᠬᠤᠸᠠᠢquwai	hui 灰 ᠾᠥᠢhüi	huan 欢 ᠬᠤᠸᠠᠨquwan	hun 昏 ᠾᠥᠨhön	huang 荒 ᠬᠤᠸᠠᠩquwang					
ᠵ j										ju 居 ᠵᠢᠤᠢjiui	jue 決 ᠵᠢᠤᠸᠸᠢjiuwei	juan 捐 ᠵᠢᠤᠠᠨjiuen	jun 軍 ᠵᠢᠶᠦᠨjiyün
ᠴ q										qu 区 ᠴᠢᠤᠢciui	que 欠 ᠴᠢᠤᠸᠸᠢciuwei	quan 圏 ᠴᠢᠤᠠᠨciuen	qun 群 ᠴᠢᠶᠦᠨciyün
ᠱ x										xu 虚 ᠰᠢᠤᠢsiui	xue 靴 ᠰᠢᠤᠸᠸᠢsiuwei	xuan 宣 ᠰᠢᠤᠠᠨsiuen	xun 勛 ᠰᠢᠶᠦᠨsiyün
ᡁᠢzh	zhu 猪 ᠵᠤju	zhua 抓 ᠵᠤᠸᠠjuwa	zhuo 桌 ᠵᠥᠸᠸjöwe	zhuai 拽 ᠵᠤᠸᠠᠢjuwai	zhui 追 ᠵᠥᠢjüi	zhuan 专 ᠵᠤᠸᠠᠨjuwan	zhun 准 ᠵᠦᠨjön	zhuang 庄 ᠵᠣᠸᠠᠩjuwang					
ᡂᠢch	chu 初 ᠴᠤču	chua 欻 ᠴᠤᠸᠠčuwa	chuo 戳 ᠴᠥᠸᠸčöwe	chuai 揣 ᠴᠤᠸᠠᠢčuwai	chui 吹 ᠴᠥᠢčüi	chuan 川 ᠴᠤᠸᠠᠨčuwan	chun 春 ᠴᠦᠨčön	chuang 窓 ᠴᠣᠸᠠᠩčuwang					
ᠱᠢsh	shu 書 ᠱᠤšu	shua 刷 ᠱᠤᠸᠠšuwa	shuo 说 ᠱᠥᠸᠸšöwe	shuai 衰 ᠱᠤᠸᠠᠢšuwai	shui 水 ᠱᠥᠢšüi	shuan 閂 ᠱᠤᠸᠠᠨšuwan	shun 順 ᠱᠦᠨšön	shuang 双 ᠱᠣᠸᠠᠩšuwang					
ᠿ ř	ru 如 ᠿᠤřu		ruo 弱 ᠿᠥᠸᠸřöwe		rui 锐 ᠿᠥᠢřüi	ruan 軟 ᠿᠤᠸᠠᠨřuwan	run 潤 ᠿᠦᠨřön						
ᠽz	zu 租 ᠽᠤzu		zuo 座 ᠽᠥᠸᠸzöwe		zui 最 ᠽᠥᠢzüi	zuan 鑽 ᠽᠤᠸᠠᠨzuwan	zun 尊 ᠽᠦᠨzön						
ᠼc	cu 粗 ᠼᠤcu		cuo 搓 ᠼᠥᠸᠸcöwe		cui 崔 ᠼᠥᠢcüi	cuan 窜 ᠼᠤᠸᠠᠨcuwan	cun 村 ᠼᠦᠨcön						
ᠰs	su 蘇 ᠰᠤsu		suo 梭 ᠰᠥᠸᠸsöwe		sui 雖 ᠰᠥᠢsüi	suan 酸 ᠰᠤᠸᠠᠨsuwan	sun 孫 ᠰᠦᠨsön						
