= Clear Script =

Writing system for the Oirat language

Clear Script Oirat alphabet
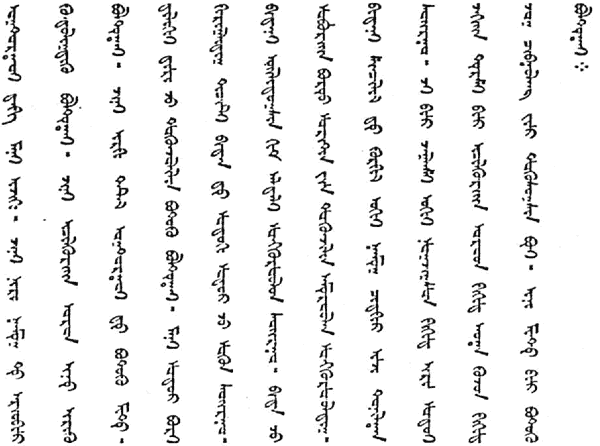
- Script type: Alphabet
- Creator: Zaya Pandita
- Period: ca. 1648 – today
- Direction: Vertical left-to-right
- Languages: Oirat; Sanskrit; Tibetic

Related scripts
- Parent systems: Egyptian hieroglyphs: Proto-Sinaitic script; Phoenician alphabet; Aramaic alphabet; Syriac alphabet; Sogdian alphabet; Old Uyghur alphabet; Mongolian script; Clear Script
- Sister systems: Manchu alphabet Vagindra script

ISO 15924
- ISO 15924: Mong (145), Mongolian

Unicode
- Unicode alias: Mongolian
- Unicode range: U+1800 – U+18AF

The Clear Script (Note: Oirat: ᡐᡆᡑᡆ ᡋᡅᡒᡅᡎ / Тодо бичиг, romanized: todo bičiq / todo bičig, [todo bit͡ʃ(ə)k]; Mongolian: Тод бичиг / ᠲᠣᠳᠣ ᠪᠢᠴᠢᠭ, romanized: tod bichig / todo bičig, [tɔd bit͡ʃək]; Russian Buryat: Тодо бэшэг, romanized: Todo besheg, [tɔdɔ bɛʃək]) is an alphabet created in 1648 by the Oirat Buddhist monk Zaya Pandita for the Oirat language. It was developed on the basis of the Mongolian script with the goal of distinguishing all sounds in the spoken language, and to make it easier to transcribe Sanskrit and the Tibetic languages.

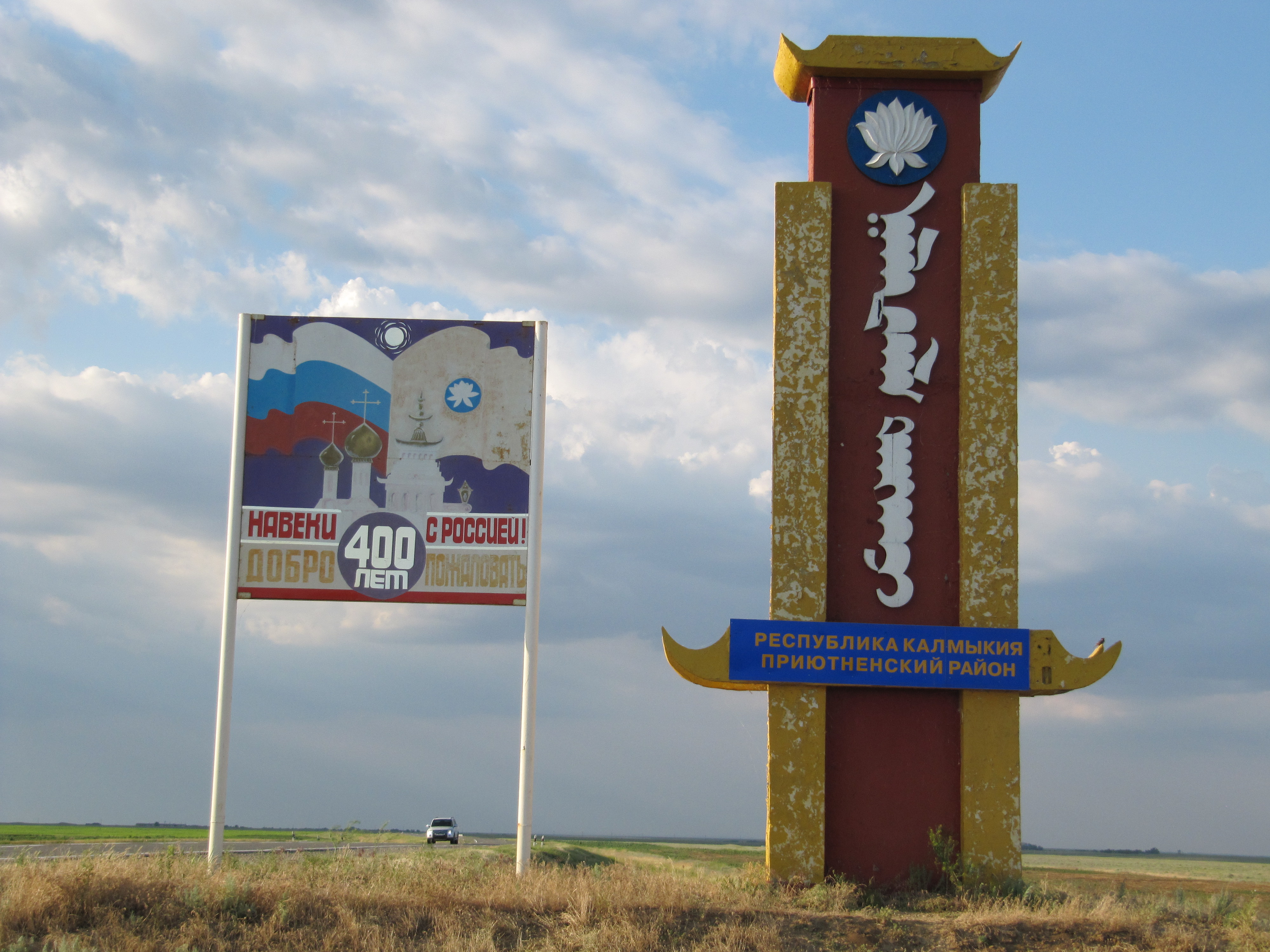
A border sign in Clear Script (Priyutnensky District, Kalmykia)

== History ==
The Clear Script is a Mongolian script, whose obvious closest forebear is vertical Mongolian. This Mongolian script was derived from the Uyghur alphabet. The Clear Script was developed as a better way to write Mongolian, specifically of the Western Mongolian groups of the Oirats and Kalmyks. It resolved ambiguities in the written language by assigning symbols to vowels, and adding new symbols and diacritics to show vowels and vowel lengths, and to distinguish between voiced and unvoiced consonants. Symbols that were preserved from the traditional Mongolian script were assigned a fixed meaning.

There were even some marks enabling distinctions that were unimportant for words written in the Oirat language but were useful for the transcription of foreign words and names, such as between ši and si.

== Usage ==
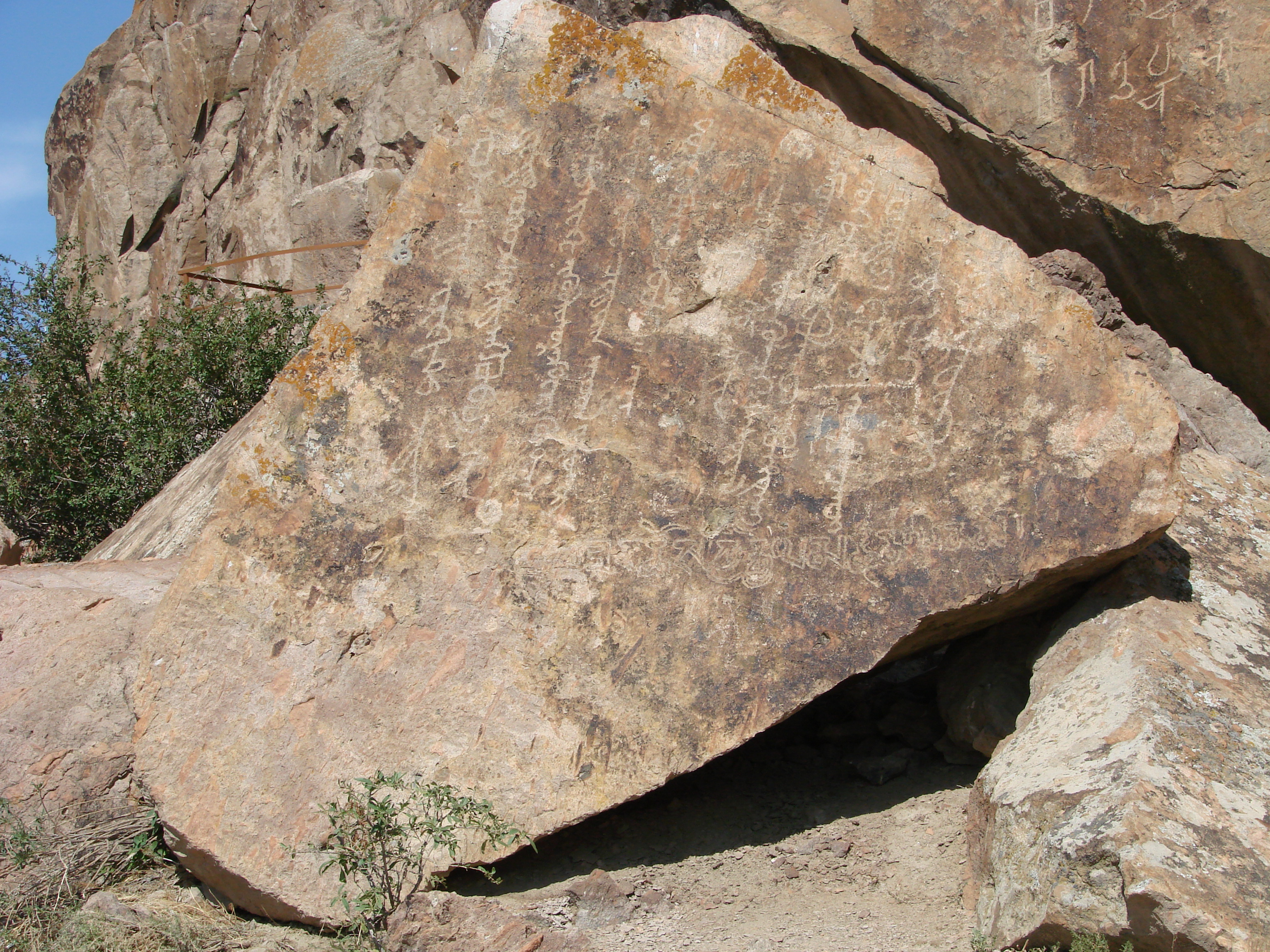
The Clear Script with Tibetan carvings and damaged pictures near Almaty, Kazakhstan.

The Clear Script was used by Oirat and neighboring Mongols, mostly in the late 17th and early 18th centuries. It was widely used by its creator and others to translate Buddhist works so that they might better spread the Buddhist religion throughout western Mongolia. Though the script was useful for translating works from other languages, especially Tibetan, it was also used more informally, as evidenced by some letters from the late 1690s.

Around the 19th to early 20th century, some Altaians in Russia were able to utilize the script to read and write texts due to contacts with Mongolian Buddhists.

The script was used by Kalmyks in Russia until 1924, when it was replaced by the Cyrillic script. In Xinjiang, Oirats still use it, although today Mongolian education takes place in Chakhar Mongolian all across China.

== Writing in the Clear Script ==
This script is a vertical script, as was its 'vertical Mongolian' parent script. Letters and diacritics are written along a central axis. Portions of letters to the right of the axis generally slant up, and portions to the left of the axis generally slant down. The only signs that do not follow these rules are the horizontal signs for S, Š, and part of Ö. Words are delineated by a space, as well as different letter forms. Though most letters only come in one shape, there are some letters that look different depending on where in the word they occur, whether they are initial, medial, or final.

== Tables ==
There is an alphabetic order in the Clear Script, as in other related scripts, but the order for it is not the same as its Mongolian parent script. The Clear Script order is: a, e, i, o, u, ö, ü; n, b, x, ɣ, g, k & k’, q, m, l, r, d, t, y, z/ǰ, c/č, s, š, ng, v/w.

=== Vowels ===
Single vowels
Initial	Medial	Final	IPA	Translit. (Note: Transliteration)		Notes (Note: Modern Kalmyk Oirat (Cyrillic) equivalent (?)) (Note: GOST 7.79-2000 (ISO 9:1995))
Initial	Medial	Final	IPA	Dan. (Note: Daniels) & Kara	ALA-LC	Notes
All these form ligatures with a preceding bow-shaped consonant.
ᠠ‍	‍ᠠ‍	‍ᠠ	ɑ, ∅	a		Final example ligature: ‍ᡋᠠ ba. This ligated form of final a extends its tail to the left. Confer Kalmyk Oirat а a and ∅. This letter's forms are shared with Hudum script a.
ᡄ‍	‍ᡄ‍	‍ᡄ	e, ∅	e		Initial/medial/final example ligature: ᡋᡄ be. Confer Kalmyk Oirat э/е e and ∅.
ᡅ‍	‍ᡅ‍	‍ᡅ	i, ∅	i		Final example ligature: ᡋᡅ bi. This ligated form of final i differs from the one used elsewhere. Confer Kalmyk Oirat и i and ∅.
ᡆ‍	‍ᡆ‍	‍ᡆ	ɔ	o		Initial/medial/final example ligature: ᡋᡆ bo. This ligated form of o is fully round. The ligature bo is also identical in form to bü. Confer Kalmyk Oirat о o and ∅.
ᡇ‍	‍ᡇ‍	‍ᡇ	ʊ, ∅	u		Initial/medial/final example ligature: ᡋᡇ bu. Confer Kalmyk Oirat у u and ∅.
ᡈ‍	‍ᡈ‍	‍ᡈ	ø, ∅	ö		Initial/medial/final example ligature: ᡋᡈ bö. This ligated form of ö is fully round. Confer Kalmyk Oirat ө ö and ∅.
ᡉ‍	‍ᡉ‍	‍ᡉ	y, ∅	ü		Initial/medial/final example ligature: ᡋᡉ bü. The ligatures bü and bo are identical in form. Confer Kalmyk Oirat ү ü and ∅.

Long vowels
Initial	Medial	Final	IPA	Translit.		Notes
Initial	Medial	Final	IPA	Dan.	ALA-LC	Notes
ᠠᡃ‍	‍ᠠᡃ‍	—	ɑː	â	ā	Final example ligature: ‍ᡗᠠᡃ kâ. Confer Kalmyk Oirat аа aa and а a.
ᡄᡃ‍	‍ᡄᡃ‍	‍ᡄᡃ^{⟨?⟩} (Note: Should appear without a final left-pointing tail.)	eː, æː	ê	ē	Confer Kalmyk Oirat ээ/ее ee and э e.
ᡅᡅ‍^{⟨?⟩} (Note: Should appear with an intervocalic tooth.)	‍ᡅᡅ‍^{⟨?⟩} (Note: Should appear with an intervocalic tooth.)	—	iː	ii	iyi	Diphthongs ending in i are shaped and transliterated in the same manner. Confer Kalmyk Oirat ии ii and и i.
—	—	‍ᡅᡅ	iː	ii	ii	Diphthongs ending in i are shaped and transliterated in the same manner. Confer Kalmyk Oirat ии ii and и i.
ᡆᡃ‍	‍ᡆᡃ‍	‍ᡆᡃ^{⟨?⟩} (Note: Should appear without a final left-pointing tail.)	ɔː	ô	ō	Confer Kalmyk Oirat оо oo and о o.
ᡇᡇ᠌‍	‍ᡇᡇ᠌‍	‍ᡇᡇ᠋	ʊː	uu		Confer Kalmyk Oirat уу uu and у u.
ᡈᡃ‍	‍ᡈᡃ‍	‍ᡈᡃ^{⟨?⟩} (Note: Should appear without a final left-pointing tail.)	øː, æː	ö̂	ȫ	Confer Kalmyk Oirat өө öö and ө ö.
ᡉᡉ‍	‍ᡉᡉ‍	‍ᡉᡉ	yː	üü		Confer Kalmyk Oirat үү üü and ү ü.

=== Consonants ===
Native consonants
Initial	Medial	Final	IPA	Translit.		Notes
Initial	Medial	Final	IPA	Dan. & Kara	ALA-LC	Notes
ᠨ‍	‍ᠨ‍	‍ᠨ	n	n		Confer Kalmyk Oirat н n. This letter is shared with Hudum n.
ᠨ‍	‍ᠨ᠋‍	‍ᠨ	n	n		Confer Kalmyk Oirat н n. This letter is shared with Hudum n.
ᡋ‍	‍ᡋ‍	‍ᡋ	b	b		Confer Kalmyk Oirat б b. This letter's initial/medial form is shared with Hudum b.
ᡍ‍	‍ᡍ‍	—	x	x		Used before back vowels. As in ᡍᠠᠷᠠ xara 'black'. (Note: Confer Kalmyk Oirat хар har; Hudum ᠬᠠᠷ᠎ᠠ qar‑a; Khalkha хар khar.) Confer Kalmyk Oirat х x.
ᡎ‍	‍ᡎ‍	—	ɢ	ɣ	ġ	Used before vowels. As in ᡎᠠᠯ ɣal 'fire'. (Note: Confer Kalmyk Oirat һал ḥal; Hudum ᠭᠠᠯ ɣal; Khalkha гал gal.) Confer Kalmyk Oirat һ h.
		—	ɡ	g		As in ᡎᡄᠷ ger 'ger'. (Note: Confer Kalmyk Oirat гер ger; Hudum ᠭᠡᠷ ger; Khalkha гэр ger.) Confer Kalmyk Oirat г g.
ᡍ᠋‍	‍ᡍ᠋‍	—	k	k		Used before front vowels. As in ᡍᡈᡍᡈ kökö 'blue'. (Note: Confer Kalmyk Oirat көк kök; Hudum ᠬᠥᠬᠡ köke; Khalkha хөх khökh.) Confer Kalmyk Oirat к k.
—	‍ᡎ᠋‍	‍ᡎ	ɡ	q		Used syllable-finally, and irrespective of vowel harmony. As in ᡔᠠᡎ caq 'time'. (Note: Confer Kalmyk Oirat цаг cag; Hudum ᠴᠠᠭ čaɣ; Khalkha цаг tsag.) Confer Kalmyk Oirat г g.
ᡏ‍	‍ᡏ‍	‍ᡏ	m	m		Confer Kalmyk Oirat м m. This letter's initial/medial form is shared with Hudum m.
ᠯ‍	‍ᠯ‍	‍ᠯ	l	l		Confer Kalmyk Oirat л l. This letter is shared with Hudum l.
ᠷ‍	‍ᠷ‍	‍ᠷ	r	r		Confer Kalmyk Oirat р r. This letter is shared with Hudum r.
ᡑ‍	‍ᡑ‍	‍ᡑ	d	d		Confer Kalmyk Oirat д d.
ᡐ‍	‍ᡐ‍	—	t	t		Confer Kalmyk Oirat т t.
ᡕ‍	‍ᡕ‍	—	j	y		Confer Kalmyk Oirat й y.
ᠴ‍	‍ᠴ‍	—	z	z, ǰ^{†}	z	†. Ambiguous value (z, ǰ) from the 18th century until post-war reform. As in modern/older ᠴᡇᠨ zun 'summer'. (Note: Confer Kalmyk Oirat зун zun; Hudum ᠵᠤᠨ ǰun; Khalkha зун zun.) Confer Kalmyk Oirat з z.
ᡓ‍	‍ᡓ‍	—	d͡ʒ	ǰ	—	Introduced in the 1950s. As in modern ᡓᡅᠯ ǰil^{?} (older ᠴᡅᠯ zil) 'year'. (Note: Confer Kalmyk Oirat җил z̦̆il; Hudum ᠵᠢᠯ ǰil; Khalkha жил jil.) Confer Kalmyk Oirat ж ž.
ᡔ‍	‍ᡔ‍	—	t͡s	c, č^{†}	c	†. Ambiguous value (c, č) from the 18th century until post-war reform. As in modern/older ᡔᠠᡅ cai 'tea'. (Note: Confer Kalmyk Oirat цә ca̋; Hudum ᠴᠠᠢ čai; Khalkha цай tsai.) Confer Kalmyk Oirat ц c.
ᡒ‍	‍ᡒ‍	—	t͡ʃ	č	—	Introduced in the 1950s. As in modern ᡒᡅ či^{?} (older ᡔᡅ ci) 'you'. (Note: Confer Kalmyk Oirat чи či; Hudum ᠴᠢ či; Khalkha чи chi.) Confer Kalmyk Oirat ч č.
ᠰ‍	‍ᠰ‍	‍ᠰ	s	s		Confer Kalmyk Oirat с s. This letter is shared with Hudum s.
ᠱ‍	‍ᠱ‍	‍ᠱ	ʃ	š	ś	Confer Kalmyk Oirat ш š. This letter is shared with Hudum š.
—	‍ᡊ‍	‍ᡊ	ŋ	ng		Confer Kalmyk Oirat ң ŋ.

Letters used in foreign words
Initial	Medial	Final	IPA	Translit.		Notes
Initial	Medial	Final	IPA	Dan. & Kara	ALA-LC	Notes
ᡌ‍	‍ᡌ‍	—	p	—	f	Confer Kalmyk Oirat п p.
ᡙ‍	‍ᡙ‍	—		—	h	Confer Kalmyk Oirat г g.
ᡘ‍	‍ᡘ‍	‍ᡘ		—	—	Confer Kalmyk Oirat г g.
ᡗ‍	‍ᡗ‍	—	k	k, k’	k	Confer Kalmyk Oirat к k.
ᡚ‍	‍ᡚ‍	—		—	j	Confer Kalmyk Oirat җ j.
—	‍ᡛ‍	—		—	ñ	
ᡜ‍	‍ᡜ‍	—		—	j	
ᢘ‍	‍ᢘ‍	‍ᢘ		—	—	
ᢙ‍	‍ᢙ‍	—		—	ź	
ᠸ‍	‍ᠸ‍	‍ᠸ		—	—	Confer Kalmyk Oirat ф f. This letter is shared with Hudum w/v.
ᡖ‍	‍ᡖ‍	‍ᡖ	w	w/v	v	Confer Kalmyk Oirat в v.

=== Ligatures ===
Ligatures
Initial	Medial	Final	Translit.		Notes
Initial	Medial	Final	Dan.	ALA-LC	Notes
ᡋᠠ‍	‍ᡋᠠ‍	‍ᡋᠠ	ba		
ᡋᡄ‍	‍ᡋᡄ‍	‍ᡋᡄ	be		
ᡋᡅ‍	‍ᡋᡅ‍	‍ᡋᡅ	bi		
ᡋᡆ‍	‍ᡋᡆ‍	‍ᡋᡆ	bo		Written the same as bü.
ᡋᡇ‍	‍ᡋᡇ‍	‍ᡋᡇ	bu		
ᡋᡈ‍	‍ᡋᡈ‍	‍ᡋᡈ	bö		
ᡋᡉ‍	‍ᡋᡉ‍	‍ᡋᡉ	bü		Written the same as bo.
ᡗᠠ‍	‍ᡗᠠ‍	‍ᡗᠠ	ka		
ᡍᡄ‍	‍ᡍᡄ‍	‍ᡍᡄ	ke		
ᡍᡅ‍	‍ᡍᡅ‍	‍ᡍᡅ	ki		
ᡗᡆ‍	‍ᡗᡆ‍	‍ᡗᡆ	ko		
ᡗᡇ‍	‍ᡗᡇ‍	‍ᡗᡇ	ku		
ᡍᡈ‍	‍ᡍᡈ‍	‍ᡍᡈ	kö		
ᡍᡉ‍^{⟨?⟩}	‍ᡍᡉ‍^{⟨?⟩}	‍ᡍᡉ^{⟨?⟩}	kü		(Note: Should appear as a bow with a down-pointing tooth, followed by a round ü.)
ᡘᠠ‍	‍ᡘᠠ‍	‍ᡘᠠ	ga		
ᡎᡄ‍^{⟨?⟩}	‍ᡎᡄ‍^{⟨?⟩}	‍ᡎᡄ^{⟨?⟩}	ge		(Note: Should appear in line with be and ke.)
ᡎᡅ‍^{⟨?⟩}	‍ᡎᡅ‍^{⟨?⟩}	‍ᡎᡅ^{⟨?⟩}	gi		(Note: Should appear in line with bi and ki.)
ᡘᡆ‍	‍ᡘᡆ‍	‍ᡘᡆ	go		
ᡘᡇ‍	‍ᡘᡇ‍	‍ᡘᡇ	gu		
ᡎᡈ‍	‍ᡎᡈ‍	‍ᡎᡈ	gö		
ᡎᡉ‍	‍ᡎᡉ‍	‍ᡎᡉ	gü		
Other bow-shaped ligatures are formed in the same manner.

== See also ==
- Mongolian writing systems
- Mongolian script
- Manchu alphabet
- Soyombo alphabet
