= E (Mongolic) =

Letter used to write Mongolic and Tungusic languages

E is a letter of related and vertically oriented alphabets used to write Mongolic and Tungusic languages.

== Mongolian language ==
E

The Mongolian script

Mongolian vowels
| ᠠ a | ᠡ e | ᠢ i | ᠣ o | ᠤ u | ᠥ ö | ᠦ ü |
| ᠧ (ē) |

Mongolian consonants
| ᠨ n | ᠩ ng | ᠪ b | ᠫ (p) | ᠬ q/k | ᠭ ɣ/g | ᠮ m |
| ᠯ l | ᠰ s | ᠱ š | ᠲ t | ᠳ d | ᠴ č | ᠵ ǰ |
| ᠶ y | ᠷ r | ᠸ (w) |

Mongolian script multigraphs

Letter
| ‑e | e | Transliteration (Note: Scholarly transliteration.) |
|---|---|---|
| — | ᠡ (Note: As in the exclamation ⟨ᠠ᠋; ⟩ a/e (Khalkha: аа/ээ/оо/өө aa/ee/oo/öö), or interjection ᠡ e (Khalkha: ээ ee) 'oh!'.) | Alone |
| — | (Note: As in the exclamation ⟨ᠠ᠋; ⟩ a/e (Khalkha: аа/ээ/оо/өө aa/ee/oo/öö).) | Alone |
| — | ᠡ‍ | Initial |
| — | ‍ᠡ‍ | Medial |
| — | ‍ᠡ | Connected final |
| ᠎ᠡ^{⟨?⟩} ⟨⟩ | — | Separated final |

Ligatures
| be | pe | ke, ge | Transliteration |
|---|---|---|---|
| ᠪᠡ (Note: As in ᠪᠠ ba (Khalkha: ба ba) 'and'.) | ᠫᠡ | ᠬᠡ (Note: As in ᠬᠡ/ᠬᠡᠭᠡ/ᠬᠡᠭᠡᠨ ke/kege/kegen (Khalkha: хээ khee) 'pattern, piping, design, stamp'.) | Alone |
| ᠪᠡ‍ | ᠫᠡ‍ | ᠬᠡ‍ | Initial |
| ‍ᠪᠡ‍ | ‍ᠫᠡ‍ | ‍ᠬᠡ‍ | Medial |
| ‍ᠪᠡ | ‍ᠫᠡ | ‍ᠬᠡ | Final |

Separated suffixes (Note: Separated suffixes starting with, or made up by the letter e include: ᠡ^{⟨?⟩} ‑e (vocative or dative-locative), ᠡᠴᠡ ‑eče (ablative), and ᠡᠴᠡᠭᠡᠨ ‑ečegen (reflexive+ablative).)
| ‑e | Transliteration |
|---|---|
| ᠡ‍ | Initial |
| ᠡ^{⟨?⟩} ⟨⟩ | Whole |

- Transcribes Chakhar /ə/; Khalkha /i/, /e/, /ə/, and /∅/. Transliterated into Cyrillic with the letter э.
- Medial and final forms may be distinguished from those of other tooth-shaped letters through: vowel harmony (a) and its effect on the shape of a word's consonants (q/k and ɣ/g), or position in syllable sequence (n, ng, d).
- The final tail extends to the left after bow-shaped consonants (such as b, p, k, and g), and to the right in all other cases.
- ᠡ᠋‍ = an Old Mongolian initial form, as in ᠡ᠋ᠨᠡ ene 'this' (otherwise written ᠡᠨᠡ).
- Derived from Old Uyghur aleph (𐽰).
- Produced with E using the Windows Mongolian keyboard layout.
- In the Mongolian Unicode block, e comes after a and before i.

=== Ee ===
Letter
| ē (é) | Transliteration (Note: Scholarly transliteration, with alternative in parentheses.) |
|---|---|
| ᠧ | Alone |
| ᠧ‍ | Initial |
| ‍ᠧ‍ | Medial |
| ‍ᠧ | Final |

Example ligatures
| fē | gē | kē | Transliteration |
|---|---|---|---|
| ᠹᠧ | ᠺᠧ | ᠻᠧ | Alone |
| ᠹᠧ‍ | ᠺᠧ‍ | ᠻᠧ‍ | Initial |
| ‍ᠹᠧ‍ | ‍ᠺᠧ‍ | ‍ᠻᠧ‍ | Medial |
| ‍ᠹᠧ | ‍ᠺᠧ | ‍ᠻᠧ | Final |

- Stands in for e in loanwords, such as in ᠧᠦ᠋ᠷᠣᠫᠠ ēüropa (Khalkha: Европ Yevrop). Transliterated into Cyrillic with the letter е.
- Indistinguishable from w, except when inferred by its placement: typically between consonants.
- Ultimately derived from Old Uyghur bet (𐽱).
- Produced with ⇧ Shift+E using the Windows Mongolian keyboard layout.
- In the Mongolian Unicode block, ē comes after ü and before n.
