= Oe (Mongolic) =

Letter used to write Mongolic and Tungusic languages

Oe is a letter of related and vertically oriented alphabets used to write Mongolic and Tungusic languages.

== Mongolian language ==
Oe

The Mongolian script

Mongolian vowels
| ᠠ a | ᠡ e | ᠢ i | ᠣ o | ᠤ u | ᠥ ö | ᠦ ü |
| ᠧ (ē) |

Mongolian consonants
| ᠨ n | ᠩ ng | ᠪ b | ᠫ (p) | ᠬ q/k | ᠭ ɣ/g | ᠮ m |
| ᠯ l | ᠰ s | ᠱ š | ᠲ t | ᠳ d | ᠴ č | ᠵ ǰ |
| ᠶ y | ᠷ r | ᠸ (w) |

Mongolian script multigraphs

Letter
| ö | Transliteration (Note: Scholarly transliteration.) |
|---|---|
| ᠥ (Note: As in ᠥ/ᠥᠭᠡ ö/öge (Khalkha: өө öö) 'fault; roughness, unevenness'.) | Alone |
| ᠥ‍ | Initial |
| ‍ᠥ᠋‍ | Medial (word-initial syllable) |
| ‍ᠥ‍ | Medial (subsequent syllables) |
| ‍ᠥ | Final |

Ligatures
| bö | pö | kö, gö | Transliteration |
|---|---|---|---|
| ᠪᠥ | ᠫᠥ | ᠭᠥ^{⟨?⟩} ⟨w/o tail⟩ (Note: As in the strengthening (emphatic) ᠭᠦ^{⟨?⟩} kü (Khalkha: хүү khüü) particle, or ᠬᠥ^{⟨?⟩}/ᠬᠥᠭᠡ kö/köge (Khalkha: хөө khöö) 'soot; obstacle, hindrance; trouble', or 'ring of mail'.) | Alone |
| ᠪᠥ | ᠫᠥ | ᠭᠥ᠋^{⟨?⟩} ⟨w/ tail⟩ | Alone |
| ᠪᠥ‍ | ᠫᠥ‍ | ᠭᠥ‍ | Initial |
| ‍ᠪᠥ‍ | ‍ᠫᠥ‍ | ‍ᠭᠥ‍ | Medial |
| ‍ᠪᠥ | ‍ᠫᠥ | ‍ᠭᠥ | Final |

- Transcribes Chakhar /o/; Khalkha /o/[ɵ], /ə/, and /∅/. Transliterated into Cyrillic with the letter ө.
- Indistinguishable from ü, except where ö can be inferred from its context:
  - ö is found in medial or final syllables if it's also found syllable-initially.
- ‍ᠥ᠋ = an alternative final form; also used in loanwords.
- The syllable-initial medial form ‍ᠥ᠋‍ is also used in non-initial syllables in proper name compounds, as well as in loanwords.
- ‍ᠥ᠌‍ = medial form used after the junction in a proper name compound.
- Derived from Old Uyghur waw (𐽳), followed by a yodh (𐽶) in word-initial syllables, and preceded by an aleph (𐽰) for isolate and initial forms.
- Produced with O using the Windows Mongolian keyboard layout.
- In the Mongolian Unicode block, ö comes after u and before ü.
