= I (Mongolic) =

Letter used to write Mongolic and Tungusic languages

I is a letter of related and vertically oriented alphabets used to write Mongolic and Tungusic languages.

== Mongolian language ==
I

The Mongolian script

Mongolian vowels
ᠠ a	ᠡ e	ᠢ i	ᠣ o	ᠤ u	ᠥ ö	ᠦ ü
ᠧ (ē)

Mongolian consonants
ᠨ n	ᠩ ng	ᠪ b	ᠫ (p)	ᠬ q/k	ᠭ ɣ/g	ᠮ m
ᠯ l	ᠰ s	ᠱ š	ᠲ t	ᠳ d	ᠴ č	ᠵ ǰ
ᠶ y	ᠷ r	ᠸ (w)

Mongolian script multigraphs

Letter
i	Transliteration (Note: Scholarly transliteration.)
ᠢ (Note: Used in enumerations, corresponding to i).)	Alone
ᠢ‍	Initial
‍ᠢ‍	Medial (syllable-initial)
(Note: Stand-in for the correct (context-sensitive only) glyph.)	Medial (syllable-final)
‍ᠢ	Final

Ligatures
bi	pi	ki, gi	Transliteration
ᠪᠢ (Note: As in ᠪᠢ bi (Khalkha: би bi) 'I'.)	ᠫᠢ	ᠬᠢ (Note: See the separated ᠬᠢ ‑ki suffix.)	Alone
ᠪᠢ‍	ᠫᠢ‍	ᠬᠢ‍	Initial
‍ᠪᠢ‍	‍ᠫᠢ‍	‍ᠬᠢ‍	Medial
‍ᠪᠢ	‍ᠫᠢ	‍ᠬᠢ	Final

Separated suffixes (Note: Separated suffixes starting with, or made up by the letter i include: ᠢ^{⟨?⟩} ‑i (accusative), ᠢᠶᠠᠨ^{⟨?⟩} ‑iyan/‑iyen (reflexive), and ᠢᠶᠠᠷ^{⟨?⟩} ‑iyar/‑iyer (instrumental).)
‑i	Transliteration
ᠢ‍^{⟨?⟩} ⟨⟩	Initial
ᠢ^{⟨?⟩} ⟨⟩	Whole

- Transcribes Chakhar /i/ or /ɪ/; Khalkha /i/, /ə/, and /∅/. Transliterated into Cyrillic with the letter и.
- Today, often absorbed into a preceding syllable when at the end of a word.
- Written medially with the single long tooth after a consonant, and with two after a vowel (with rare exceptions like ᠨᠠ‍ᠢ‍ᠮᠠ naima 'eight' or ᠨᠠ‍ᠢ‍ᠮᠠᠨ naiman 'eight'/tribal name).
- ‍ᠢ᠋‍ = a handwritten Inner Mongolian variant on the sequence yi (as in ᠰᠠᠶ᠋ᠢᠨ / ᠰᠠᠶᠢᠨ sayin 'good' being written ᠰᠠᠢ᠋ᠨ sain).
  - Also the medial form used after the junction in a proper name compound.
- Derived from Old Uyghur yodh (𐽶), preceded by an aleph (𐽰) for isolate and initial forms.
- Produced with I using the Windows Mongolian keyboard layout.
- In the Mongolian Unicode block, i comes after e and before o.
