= Ue (Mongolic) =

Letter used to write Mongolic and Tungusic languages

Ue is a letter of related and vertically oriented alphabets used to write Mongolic and Tungusic languages.

== Mongolian language ==
Ue

The Mongolian script

Mongolian vowels
ᠠ a	ᠡ e	ᠢ i	ᠣ o	ᠤ u	ᠥ ö	ᠦ ü
ᠧ (ē)

Mongolian consonants
ᠨ n	ᠩ ng	ᠪ b	ᠫ (p)	ᠬ q/k	ᠭ ɣ/g	ᠮ m
ᠯ l	ᠰ s	ᠱ š	ᠲ t	ᠳ d	ᠴ č	ᠵ ǰ
ᠶ y	ᠷ r	ᠸ (w)

Mongolian script multigraphs

Letter
ü	Transliteration (Note: Scholarly transliteration.)
ᠦ (Note: As in ᠡᠭᠦᠦ/ᠦ egüü/ü (Khalkha: үү üü) 'wart; excrescence'.)	Alone
ᠦ‍	Initial
‍ᠦ᠋‍	Medial (word-initial syllable)
‍ᠦ‍	Medial (subsequent syllables)
‍ᠦ	Final

Ligatures
bü	pü	kü, gü	Transliteration
ᠪᠦ	ᠫᠦ	ᠭᠦ^{⟨?⟩} ⟨w/o tail⟩ (Note: As in the strengthening (emphatic) ᠭᠦ^{⟨?⟩} kü (Khalkha: хүү khüü) particle, or ᠬᠥ^{⟨?⟩}/ᠬᠥᠭᠡ kö/köge (Khalkha: хөө khöö) 'soot; obstacle, hindrance; trouble', or 'ring of mail'.)	Alone
ᠪᠦ	ᠫᠦ	ᠭᠦ᠋^{⟨?⟩} ⟨w/ tail⟩	Alone
ᠪᠦ‍	ᠫᠦ‍	ᠭᠦ‍	Initial
‍ᠪᠦ‍	‍ᠫᠦ‍	‍ᠭᠦ‍	Medial
‍ᠪᠦ	‍ᠫᠦ	‍ᠭᠦ	Final

Separated suffixes (Note: Separated suffixes starting with, or made up by the letter ü include: ᠦ^{⟨?⟩} ‑ü or ᠦᠨ^{⟨?⟩} ‑ün (genitive), ᠦᠭᠡᠢ^{⟨?⟩} ‑ügei (negation), and ᠦᠳ^{⟨?⟩} ‑üd (plural).)
‑ü(...)	‑ü	‑ün	‑ügei	‑üd	Transliteration
	ᠦ^{⟨?⟩}	—	—	—	Whole
	—	ᠦᠨ^{⟨?⟩}	—	ᠦᠳ^{⟨?⟩}	Whole
	—	—	ᠦᠭᠡᠢ^{⟨?⟩}	—	Whole

- Transcribes Chakhar /u/; Khalkha /u/, /ə/, and /∅/. Transliterated into Cyrillic with the letter ү.
- Indistinguishable from ö, except where ü can be inferred from its context:
  - ü is found in medial or final syllables if e/i/ü are found syllable-initially.
- ‍ᠦ᠋ = an alternative final form; also used in loanwords. Additionally used in native and modern Mongolian ᠰᠦ᠋^{⟨?⟩} sü 'milk' (Classical Mongolian ᠰᠦ^{⟨?⟩} ⟨⟩ sü or ᠰᠦᠨ sün). (Note: Lessing, Ferdinand (1960). Mongolian-English Dictionary (PDF). University of California Press. Note that this dictionary uses the transliterations c, ø, x, y, z, ai, and ei; instead of č, ö, q, ü, ǰ, ayi, and eyi; as well as problematically and incorrectly treats all rounded vowels (o/u/ö/ü) after the initial syllable as u or ü.)
- The syllable-initial medial form ‍ᠦ᠋‍ is also used in non-initial syllables in proper name compounds, as well as in loanwords.
- ‍ᠦ᠌‍ = medial form used after the junction in a proper name compound.
- Derived from Old Uyghur waw (𐽳), followed by a yodh (𐽶) in word-initial syllables, and preceded by an aleph (𐽰) for isolate and initial forms.
- Produced with U using the Windows Mongolian keyboard layout.
- In the Mongolian Unicode block, ü comes after ö and before ē.
