= Ga (Mongolic) =

Letter used to write Mongolic and Tungusic languages

Ga is a letter of related and vertically oriented alphabets used to write Mongolic and Tungusic languages.

== Mongolian language ==
Ga

The Mongolian script

Mongolian vowels
ᠠ a	ᠡ e	ᠢ i	ᠣ o	ᠤ u	ᠥ ö	ᠦ ü
ᠧ (ē)

Mongolian consonants
ᠨ n	ᠩ ng	ᠪ b	ᠫ (p)	ᠬ q/k	ᠭ ɣ/g	ᠮ m
ᠯ l	ᠰ s	ᠱ š	ᠲ t	ᠳ d	ᠴ č	ᠵ ǰ
ᠶ y	ᠷ r	ᠸ (w)

Mongolian script multigraphs

Letter
ɣ	g	Transliteration (Note: Scholarly transliteration, with alternative in parentheses.)
ᠭ		Initial
‍ᠭ᠋‍^{⟨?⟩} ⟨⟩	‍ᠭ᠍‍^{⟨?⟩} ⟨⟩	Medial (syllable-initial)
‍ᠭ‍^{⟨?⟩} ⟨⟩	‍ᠭ᠍‍^{⟨?⟩} ⟨⟩	Medial (syllable-final)
‍ᠭ (Note: For the two harmonic variants of the particle ᠰᠢᠭ᠋^{⟨?⟩}/ᠰᠢᠭ^{⟨?⟩} siɣ/sig (Khalkha: шиг shig) 'similar to, similarly, like' etc., the choice between final ɣ or g is dependent on whether it occurs after a masculine or a feminine word, respectively.)	‍ᠭ᠋^{⟨?⟩} ⟨⟩	Final

C-V syllables
ɣ‑a	ɣa	ge	gi	ɣo, ɣu	gö, gü	Transliteration
—	ᠭᠠ	ᠭᠡ (Note: As in ᠬᠡ/ᠬᠡᠭᠡ/ᠬᠡᠭᠡᠨ ke/kege/kegen (Khalkha: хээ khee) 'pattern, piping, design, stamp'.)	ᠭᠢ (Note: See the separated ᠬᠢ ‑ki suffix.)	ᠭᠣ᠋	ᠭᠥ^{⟨?⟩} ⟨w/o tail⟩ (Note: As in the strengthening (emphatic) ᠭᠦ^{⟨?⟩} kü (Khalkha: хүү khüü) particle, or ᠬᠥ^{⟨?⟩}/ᠬᠥᠭᠡ kö/köge (Khalkha: хөө khöö) 'soot; obstacle, hindrance; trouble', or 'ring of mail'.)	Alone
—	ᠭᠠ	ᠭᠡ	ᠭᠢ	ᠭᠣ᠋	ᠭᠥ᠋^{⟨?⟩} ⟨w/ tail⟩	Alone
—	ᠭᠠ‍	ᠭᠡ‍	ᠭᠢ‍	ᠭᠣ‍	ᠭᠥ‍	Initial
—	‍ᠭᠠ‍	‍ᠭᠡ‍	‍ᠭᠢ‍	‍ᠭᠣ‍	‍ᠭᠥ‍	Medial
‍ᠭ᠎ᠠ^{⟨?⟩} ⟨⟩	—	‍ᠭᠡ	‍ᠭᠢ^{⟨?⟩} ⟨‍ᠬᠢ⟩	‍ᠭᠣ	‍ᠭᠥ	Final

=== ɣ/g ===
- Produced with G using the Windows Mongolian keyboard layout.
- In the Mongolian Unicode block, ɣ/g comes after q/k and before m.
- May turn silent between vowels, and merge these into a long vowel or diphthong. For more details on this, see Mongolian script multigraphs.

=== ɣ ===
- Transcribes Chakhar /ɣ/; Khalkha /ɢ/, and /∅/. Transliterated into Cyrillic with the letter г.
- Dotted before a vowel (attached or separated); undotted before a consonant (syllable-final) or a whitespace.
- Derived from Old Uyghur merged gimel and heth (𐽲).

=== g ===
- Transcribes Chakhar /g/; Khalkha /g/. Transliterated into Cyrillic with the letter г.
- Syllable-initially indistinguishable from k. When it must be distinguished from k medially, it can be written twice (as in ᠥᠭᠭᠦᠭᠰᠡᠨ öggügsen 'given', compared with ᠦᠬᠦᠭᠰᠡᠨ ükügsen 'dead').
- The final form is also found written like the bow-shaped Manchu final ‍ᡴ᠋ k.
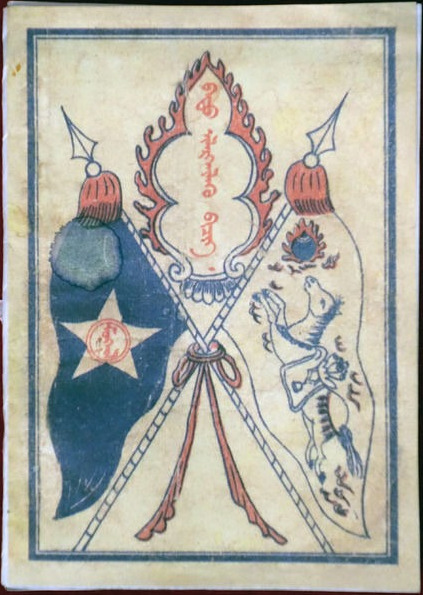
  Emblem of the Inner Mongolian People's Revolutionary Party using bow-shaped final g in bičig
- Derived from Old Uyghur kaph 𐽷).
