= O (Mongolic) =

Letter used to write Mongolic and Tungusic languages

O is a letter of related and vertically oriented alphabets used to write Mongolic and Tungusic languages.

== Mongolian language ==
O

The Mongolian script

Mongolian vowels
ᠠ a	ᠡ e	ᠢ i	ᠣ o	ᠤ u	ᠥ ö	ᠦ ü
ᠧ (ē)

Mongolian consonants
ᠨ n	ᠩ ng	ᠪ b	ᠫ (p)	ᠬ q/k	ᠭ ɣ/g	ᠮ m
ᠯ l	ᠰ s	ᠱ š	ᠲ t	ᠳ d	ᠴ č	ᠵ ǰ
ᠶ y	ᠷ r	ᠸ (w)

Mongolian script multigraphs

Letter
o	Transliteration (Note: Scholarly transliteration.)
ᠣ (Note: As in ᠣ o (Khalkha: оо oo) 'powder' in general; 'face powder'.)	Alone
ᠣ‍	Initial
‍ᠣ‍	Medial
‍ᠣ	Final

Ligatures
bo	po	Transliteration
ᠪᠣ	ᠫᠣ	Alone
ᠪᠣ‍	ᠫᠣ‍	Initial
‍ᠪᠣ‍	‍ᠫᠣ‍	Medial
‍ᠪᠣ	‍ᠫᠣ	Final

- Transcribes Chakhar /ɔ/; Khalkha /ɔ/, /ə/, and /∅/. Transliterated into Cyrillic with the letter о.
- Indistinguishable from u, except where o can be inferred from its context:
  - o is found in medial or final syllables if it's also found syllable-initially (and occasionally after a syllable-initial i).
- ‍ᠣ᠋ = the final form used in loanwords, as in ᠷᠠᠳᠢᠣ᠋ radio (радио radio).
- ‍ᠣ᠋‍ = medial form used after the junction in a proper name compound.
- Derived from Old Uyghur waw (𐽳), preceded by an aleph (𐽰) for isolate and initial forms.
- Produced with W using the Windows Mongolian keyboard layout.
- In the Mongolian Unicode block, o comes after i and before u.
