= U (Mongolic) =

Letter used to write Mongolic and Tungusic languages

U is a letter of related and vertically oriented alphabets used to write Mongolic and Tungusic languages.

== Mongolian language ==
U

The Mongolian script

Mongolian vowels
ᠠ a	ᠡ e	ᠢ i	ᠣ o	ᠤ u	ᠥ ö	ᠦ ü
ᠧ (ē)

Mongolian consonants
ᠨ n	ᠩ ng	ᠪ b	ᠫ (p)	ᠬ q/k	ᠭ ɣ/g	ᠮ m
ᠯ l	ᠰ s	ᠱ š	ᠲ t	ᠳ d	ᠴ č	ᠵ ǰ
ᠶ y	ᠷ r	ᠸ (w)

Mongolian script multigraphs

Letter
u	Transliteration (Note: Scholarly transliteration.)
ᠤ	Alone
ᠤ‍	Initial
‍ᠤ‍	Medial
‍ᠤ	Final

Ligatures
bu	pu	Transliteration
ᠪᠤ	ᠫᠤ	Alone
ᠪᠤ‍	ᠫᠤ‍	Initial
‍ᠪᠤ‍	‍ᠫᠤ‍	Medial
‍ᠪᠤ	‍ᠫᠤ	Final

Separated suffixes (Note: Separated suffixes starting with, or made up by the letter u include: ᠤ^{⟨?⟩} ‑u or ᠤᠨ^{⟨?⟩} ‑un (genitive), ᠤᠳ^{⟨?⟩} ‑ud (plural), and ᠤᠷᠤᠭᠤ^{⟨?⟩} ‑uruɣu (directive).)
‑u(...)	‑u	‑un	‑ud	‑uruɣu	Transliteration
	ᠤ^{⟨?⟩}	—	—	—	Whole
	—	ᠤᠨ^{⟨?⟩}	ᠤᠳ^{⟨?⟩}	—	Whole
	—	—	—	ᠤᠷᠤᠭᠤ^{⟨?⟩}	Whole

- Transcribes Chakhar /ʊ/; Khalkha /ʊ/, /ə/, and /∅/. Transliterated into Cyrillic with the letter у.
- Indistinguishable from o, except where u can be inferred from its context:
  - u is found in medial or final syllables if a/u are found syllable-initially (and most often after a syllable-initial i).
- ‍ᠤ᠋‍ = medial form used after the junction in a proper name compound.
- Derived from Old Uyghur waw (𐽳), preceded by an aleph (𐽰) for isolate and initial forms.
- Produced with V using the Windows Mongolian keyboard layout.
- In the Mongolian Unicode block, u comes after o and before ö.
