= Cha (Mongolic) =

Letter used to write Mongolic and Tungusic languages

Cha is a letter of related and vertically oriented alphabets used to write Mongolic and Tungusic languages.

== Mongolian language ==
Cha

The Mongolian script

Mongolian vowels
ᠠ a	ᠡ e	ᠢ i	ᠣ o	ᠤ u	ᠥ ö	ᠦ ü
ᠧ (ē)

Mongolian consonants
ᠨ n	ᠩ ng	ᠪ b	ᠫ (p)	ᠬ q/k	ᠭ ɣ/g	ᠮ m
ᠯ l	ᠰ s	ᠱ š	ᠲ t	ᠳ d	ᠴ č	ᠵ ǰ
ᠶ y	ᠷ r	ᠸ (w)

Mongolian script multigraphs

Letter
č	Transliteration (Note: Scholarly transliteration.)
ᠴ‍	Initial
‍ᠴ‍	Medial (syllable-initial)
—	Medial (syllable-final)
(‍ᠴ)	Final (Note: Not found in native Mongolian words.)

C-V syllables
ča, če	či	čo, ču	čö	čü	Transliteration
ᠴᠠ	ᠴᠢ (Note: As in the second person singular pronoun ᠴᠢ či (Khalkha: чи chi) 'thou' (singular 'you').)	ᠴᠣ᠋	ᠴᠥ᠋		Alone
ᠴᠠ	ᠴᠢ	ᠴᠣ (Note: As in the strengthening/intensifying (emphatic) and concessive ⟨ᠴᠤ⟩ ču/čü (Khalkha: ч ch) 'even, as for' particle, ᠴᠣ/ᠴᠣᠭᠤ čo/čoɣu (Khalkha: цоо tsoo) 'through and through, completely', or ᠴᠦ čü (Khalkha: цүү tsüü) 'spike, bolt'.)	—	ᠴᠦ	Alone
ᠴᠠ‍	ᠴᠢ‍	ᠴᠣ‍	ᠴᠥ‍		Initial
‍ᠴᠠ‍	‍ᠴᠢ‍	‍ᠴᠣ‍			Medial
‍ᠴᠠ	‍ᠴᠢ	‍ᠴᠣ			Final

- Transcribes Chakhar /t͡ʃ/; Khalkha /t͡ʃʰ/, and /t͡sʰ/ (Mongolian Cyrillic ч, and ц, respectively). Transliterated into Cyrillic with the letter ч.
- For Buryat, a derived letter with two dots on the right ⟨ᡸ; ⟩ is used in places where č is pronounced as š.
- Derived from Old Uyghur (through early Mongolian) tsade (𐽽).
- Produced with Q using the Windows Mongolian keyboard layout.
- In the Mongolian Unicode block, č comes after d and before ǰ.
