= Ang (Mongolic) =

Letter used to write Mongolic and Tungusic languages

Ang is a letter of related and vertically oriented alphabets used to write Mongolic and Tungusic languages.

== Mongolian language ==
Ang

The Mongolian script

Mongolian vowels
ᠠ a	ᠡ e	ᠢ i	ᠣ o	ᠤ u	ᠥ ö	ᠦ ü
ᠧ (ē)

Mongolian consonants
ᠨ n	ᠩ ng	ᠪ b	ᠫ (p)	ᠬ q/k	ᠭ ɣ/g	ᠮ m
ᠯ l	ᠰ s	ᠱ š	ᠲ t	ᠳ d	ᠴ č	ᠵ ǰ
ᠶ y	ᠷ r	ᠸ (w)

Mongolian script multigraphs

Letter
ng (ŋ)	Transliteration (Note: Scholarly transliteration, with alternative in parentheses.)
⟨ᠡᠭ⟩ (Note: As in the crying of babies, ᠢᠩ ᠩ ⟨ᠢᠩ ᠡᠭ⟩ ing ng.)	Isolate
—	Initial
—	Medial (syllable-initial)
‍ᠩ‍	Medial (syllable-final)
‍ᠩ	Final

- Transcribes Chakhar /ŋ/; Khalkha /ŋ/. Transliterated into Cyrillic with the letters нг.
- Derived from Old Uyghur nun-kaph (𐽺 and 𐽷) digraph.
- Produced with ⇧ Shift+N using the Windows Mongolian keyboard layout.
- In the Mongolian Unicode block, ng comes after n and before b.
