= Qa (Mongolic) =

Letter used to write Mongolic and Tungusic languages

Qa is a letter of related and vertically oriented alphabets used to write Mongolic and Tungusic languages.

== Mongolian language ==
Qa

The Mongolian script

Mongolian vowels
ᠠ a	ᠡ e	ᠢ i	ᠣ o	ᠤ u	ᠥ ö	ᠦ ü
ᠧ (ē)

Mongolian consonants
ᠨ n	ᠩ ng	ᠪ b	ᠫ (p)	ᠬ q/k	ᠭ ɣ/g	ᠮ m
ᠯ l	ᠰ s	ᠱ š	ᠲ t	ᠳ d	ᠴ č	ᠵ ǰ
ᠶ y	ᠷ r	ᠸ (w)

Mongolian script multigraphs

Letter
q	k	Transliteration (Note: Scholarly transliteration.)
ᠬ		Initial
‍ᠬ‍		Medial (syllable-initial)
—	—	Medial (syllable-final)
—	—	Final

C-V syllables
q‑a	qa	ke	ki	qo, qu	kö, kü	Transliteration
—	ᠬᠠ (Note: As in ᠬᠠ/ᠬᠠᠮᠢᠭ᠎ᠠ^{⟨?⟩} qa/qamiɣ‑a (Khalkha: хаа khaa) 'where'.)	ᠬᠡ (Note: As in ᠬᠡ/ᠬᠡᠭᠡ/ᠬᠡᠭᠡᠨ ke/kege/kegen (Khalkha: хээ khee) 'pattern, piping, design, stamp'.)	ᠬᠢ (Note: See the separated ᠬᠢ ‑ki suffix.)	ᠬᠣ᠋	ᠬᠥ^{⟨?⟩} ⟨w/o tail⟩ (Note: As in the strengthening (emphatic) ᠭᠦ^{⟨?⟩} kü (Khalkha: хүү khüü) particle, or ᠬᠥ^{⟨?⟩}/ᠬᠥᠭᠡ kö/köge (Khalkha: хөө khöö) 'soot; obstacle, hindrance; trouble', or 'ring of mail'.)	Alone
—	ᠬᠠ	ᠬᠡ	ᠬᠢ	ᠬᠣ᠋	ᠬᠥ᠋^{⟨?⟩} ⟨w/ tail⟩	Alone
—	ᠬᠠ‍	ᠬᠡ‍	ᠬᠢ‍	ᠬᠣ‍	ᠬᠥ‍	Initial
—	‍ᠬᠠ‍	‍ᠬᠡ‍	‍ᠬᠢ‍	‍ᠬᠣ‍	‍ᠬᠥ‍	Medial
‍ᠬ᠎ᠠ^{⟨?⟩} ⟨⟩	—	‍ᠬᠡ	‍ᠬᠢ	‍ᠬᠣ	‍ᠬᠥ	Final

Separated suffixes (Note: Separated suffixes starting with the letter k include: ᠬᠢ ‑ki or ᠬᠢᠨ ‑kin (case-bound possession).)
‑ki	‑kin	Transliteration
ᠬᠢ	ᠬᠢᠨ	Whole

=== q/k ===
- Transcribes Chakhar /x/; Khalkha /x/. Transliterated into Cyrillic with the letter х.
- Produced with H using the Windows Mongolian keyboard layout.
- In the Mongolian Unicode block, q/k comes after p and before ɣ/g.

=== q ===
- Distinction from other tooth-shaped letters by position in syllable sequence.
- A separated isolate-shaped ‑q appears in the Uyghur loan title ayaɣ‑q‑a tegimlig 'worthy of respect; reverend'.
- Derived from Old Uyghur merged gimel and heth (𐽲).

=== k ===
- Syllable-initially indistinguishable from g.
- Derived from Old Uyghur kaph (𐽷).
