= Ta (Mongolic) =

Letter used to write Mongolic and Tungusic languages

Ta is a letter of related and vertically oriented alphabets used to write Mongolic and Tungusic languages.

== Mongolian language ==
Ta

The Mongolian script

Mongolian vowels
ᠠ a	ᠡ e	ᠢ i	ᠣ o	ᠤ u	ᠥ ö	ᠦ ü
ᠧ (ē)

Mongolian consonants
ᠨ n	ᠩ ng	ᠪ b	ᠫ (p)	ᠬ q/k	ᠭ ɣ/g	ᠮ m
ᠯ l	ᠰ s	ᠱ š	ᠲ t	ᠳ d	ᠴ č	ᠵ ǰ
ᠶ y	ᠷ r	ᠸ (w)

Mongolian script multigraphs

Letter
t	Transliteration (Note: Scholarly transliteration.)
ᠲ‍	Initial
‍ᠲ‍	Medial (syllable-initial)
—	Medial (syllable-final)
—	Final

C-V syllables
ta, te	ti	to, tu	tö, tü	Transliteration
ᠲᠠ (Note: As in the second person singular/plural pronoun ᠲᠠ ta 'you', or the intensifying ⟨ᠳᠠ⟩ da/de (Khalkha: даа/дээ daa/dee) particle used after the predicate.)	ᠲᠢ	ᠲᠣ᠋	ᠲᠥ᠋	Alone
ᠲᠠ‍	ᠲᠢ‍	ᠲᠣ‍	ᠲᠥ‍	Initial
‍ᠲᠠ‍	‍ᠲᠢ‍	‍ᠲᠣ‍		Medial
‍ᠲᠠ	‍ᠲᠢ	‍ᠲᠣ		Final

Separated suffixes (Note: Separated suffixes starting with the letter t include: ᠲᠠᠢ ‑tai/‑tei (comitative), ᠲᠠᠭᠠᠨ/ ᠲᠡᠭᠡᠨ ‑taɣan/‑tegen (reflexive+dative-locative), ᠲᠠᠶᠢᠭᠠᠨ^{⟨?⟩}/ ᠲᠡᠶᠢᠭᠡᠨ^{⟨?⟩} ‑tayiɣan/‑teyigen (reflexive+comitative), and ᠲᠤ ‑tu/‑tü or ᠲᠤᠷ ‑tur/‑tür (dative-locative).)
‑ta, ‑te	‑tu, ‑tü	Transliteration
—	ᠲᠤ	Whole
ᠲᠠ‍	ᠲᠤ‍	Initial

- Transcribes Chakhar /t/; Khalkha /t/. Transliterated into Cyrillic with the letter т.
- Syllable-initially indistinguishable from d.
- Derived from Old Uyghur taw (𐾀; initial) and lamedh (𐽸; medial).
- Positional variants of initial taw ⟨ᠲ‍/‍ᠲ᠋‍/‍ᠲ⟩ can be used to clarify the spelling of t in words of foreign origin, as in ᠹᠣᠲ᠋ᠣ᠋ foto 'photograph' (фото foto), ᠲᠢᠶᠠᠲ᠋ᠷ tiyatr 'theatre' (театр teatr), and ᠻᠠᠷᠲ khart 'card' (карт kart).
- Produced with T using the Windows Mongolian keyboard layout.
- In the Mongolian Unicode block, t comes after š and before d.
