= Ya (Mongolic) =

Letter used to write Mongolic and Tungusic languages

Ya is a letter of related and vertically oriented alphabets used to write Mongolic and Tungusic languages.

== Mongolian language ==
Ya

The Mongolian script

Mongolian vowels
ᠠ a	ᠡ e	ᠢ i	ᠣ o	ᠤ u	ᠥ ö	ᠦ ü
ᠧ (ē)

Mongolian consonants
ᠨ n	ᠩ ng	ᠪ b	ᠫ (p)	ᠬ q/k	ᠭ ɣ/g	ᠮ m
ᠯ l	ᠰ s	ᠱ š	ᠲ t	ᠳ d	ᠴ č	ᠵ ǰ
ᠶ y	ᠷ r	ᠸ (w)

Mongolian script multigraphs

Letter
y	Transliteration (Note: Scholarly transliteration.)
ᠶ‍	Initial
‍ᠶ᠋‍^{⟨?⟩} ⟨⟩	Medial (syllable-initial)
‍ᠶ‍^{⟨?⟩} ⟨⟩	Medial (syllable-initial; diphthongs)
—	Medial (syllable-final)
—	Final

C-V syllables
y‑a, y‑e	ya, ye	yi	yo, yu	yö, yü	Transliteration
—	ᠶᠠ	ᠶᠢ	ᠶᠣ᠋	ᠶᠥ᠋	Alone
—	ᠶᠠ‍	ᠶᠢ‍	ᠶᠣ‍	ᠶᠥ‍	Initial
—	‍ᠶᠠ‍	‍ᠶᠢ‍	‍ᠶᠣ‍		Medial
‍ᠶ᠎ᠠ^{⟨?⟩} ⟨⟩	‍ᠶᠠ	‍ᠶᠢ	‍ᠶᠣ		Final

Separated suffixes (Note: Separated suffixes starting with the letter y include: ᠶᠢ^{⟨?⟩} ‑yi (accusative), ᠶᠢᠨ^{⟨?⟩} ‑yin (genitive), and ᠶᠤᠭᠠᠨ^{⟨?⟩}/ ᠶᠦᠭᠡᠨ^{⟨?⟩} ‑yuɣan/‑yügen (reflexive+accusative).)
‑y(...)	‑yi	‑yin	‑yuɣan	‑yügen	Transliteration
	ᠶᠢ^{⟨?⟩}	ᠶᠢᠨ^{⟨?⟩}	—		Whole
	—		ᠶᠤᠭᠠᠨ	ᠶᠦᠭᠡᠨ^{⟨?⟩}	Whole

- Transcribes Chakhar /j/; Khalkha /j/. Transliterated into Cyrillic with the letter й.
- Derived from Old Uyghur yodh (𐽶) originally, and also later in the 19th century from Manchu yodh with an upturn ⟨ᠶ‍⟩ as an initial form.
- Produced with Y using the Windows Mongolian keyboard layout.
- In the Mongolian Unicode block, y comes after ǰ and before r.
