= A (Mongolic) =

Letter used to write Mongolic and Tungusic languages

A is a letter of related and vertically oriented alphabets used to write Mongolic and Tungusic languages.

== Mongolian language ==
A

The Mongolian script

Mongolian vowels
ᠠ a	ᠡ e	ᠢ i	ᠣ o	ᠤ u	ᠥ ö	ᠦ ü
ᠧ (ē)

Mongolian consonants
ᠨ n	ᠩ ng	ᠪ b	ᠫ (p)	ᠬ q/k	ᠭ ɣ/g	ᠮ m
ᠯ l	ᠰ s	ᠱ š	ᠲ t	ᠳ d	ᠴ č	ᠵ ǰ
ᠶ y	ᠷ r	ᠸ (w)

Mongolian script multigraphs

Letter
‑a	a	Transliteration (Note: Scholarly transliteration.)
—	ᠠ (Note: As in the interjection ᠠ a (Khalkha: аа aa) 'a!, oh!, well!'.)	Alone
—	ᠠ᠋ (Note: As in the exclamation ⟨ᠠ᠋; ⟩ a/e (Khalkha: аа/ээ/оо/өө aa/ee/oo/öö), or interjection ᠡ e (Khalkha: ээ ee) 'oh!'.)	Alone
—	(Note: As in the exclamation ⟨ᠠ᠋; ⟩ a/e (Khalkha: аа/ээ/оо/өө aa/ee/oo/öö).)	Alone
—	ᠠ‍ (Note: Also used in enumerations, akin to a) or b).)	Initial
—	‍ᠠ‍	Medial
—	‍ᠠ	Connected final
᠎ᠠ^{⟨?⟩} ⟨⟩	—	Separated final

Ligatures
ba	pa	Transliteration
ᠪᠠ (Note: As in ᠪᠠ ba (Khalkha: ба ba) 'and'.)	ᠫᠠ	Alone
ᠪᠠ‍	ᠫᠠ‍	Initial
‍ᠪᠠ‍	‍ᠫᠠ‍	Medial
‍ᠪᠠ	‍ᠫᠠ	Final

Separated suffixes (Note: Separated suffixes starting with, or made up by the letter a include: ᠠ^{⟨?⟩} ‑a (vocative or dative-locative), ᠠᠴᠠ^{⟨?⟩} ‑ača (ablative), and ᠠᠴᠠᠭᠠᠨ^{⟨?⟩} ‑ačaɣan (reflexive+ablative).)
‑a	Transliteration
ᠠ‍^{⟨?⟩} ⟨⟩	Initial
ᠠ^{⟨?⟩} ⟨⟩	Whole

- Transcribes Chakhar /ɑ/; Khalkha /a/, /ə/, and /∅/. Transliterated into Cyrillic with the letter а.
- Medial and final forms may be distinguished from those of other tooth-shaped letters through: vowel harmony (e), the shape of adjacent consonants (q/k and ɣ/g), and position in syllable sequence (n, ng, q, ɣ, d).
- The final tail extends to the left after bow-shaped consonants (such as b, and p), and to the right in all other cases.
- ‍ᠠ᠋‍ = medial form used after the junction in a proper name compound.
- ‍ᠠ᠋^{⟨?⟩} ⟨⟩ = connected galik final.
- Derived from Old Uyghur aleph (𐽰), written twice for isolate and initial forms.
- Produced with A using the Windows Mongolian keyboard layout.
- In the Mongolian Unicode block, a comes before e.
