= Da (Mongolic) =

Letter used to write Mongolic and Tungusic languages

Da is a letter of related and vertically oriented alphabets used to write Mongolic and Tungusic languages.

== Mongolian language ==
Da

The Mongolian script

Mongolian vowels
ᠠ a	ᠡ e	ᠢ i	ᠣ o	ᠤ u	ᠥ ö	ᠦ ü
ᠧ (ē)

Mongolian consonants
ᠨ n	ᠩ ng	ᠪ b	ᠫ (p)	ᠬ q/k	ᠭ ɣ/g	ᠮ m
ᠯ l	ᠰ s	ᠱ š	ᠲ t	ᠳ d	ᠴ č	ᠵ ǰ
ᠶ y	ᠷ r	ᠸ (w)

Mongolian script multigraphs

Letter
d	Transliteration (Note: Scholarly transliteration.)
ᠳ‍	Initial
‍ᠳ᠋‍^{⟨?⟩} ⟨⟩	Medial (syllable-initial)
‍ᠳ‍^{⟨?⟩} ⟨⟩	Medial (syllable-final)
‍ᠳ	Final

C-V syllables
da, de	di	do, du	dö, dü	Transliteration
ᠳᠠ (Note: As in the second person singular/plural pronoun ᠲᠠ ta 'you', or the intensifying ⟨ᠳᠠ⟩ da/de (Khalkha: даа/дээ daa/dee) particle used after the predicate.)	ᠳᠢ	ᠳᠣ᠋	ᠳᠥ᠋	Alone
ᠳᠠ	ᠳᠢ	ᠳ᠋ᠣ᠋	ᠳ᠋ᠥ᠋	Alone
ᠳᠠ‍	ᠳᠢ‍	ᠳᠣ‍	ᠳᠥ‍	Initial
‍ᠳᠠ‍	‍ᠳᠢ‍	‍ᠳᠣ‍		Medial
‍ᠳᠠ	‍ᠳᠢ	‍ᠳᠣ		Final

Separated suffixes (Note: Separated suffixes starting with the letter d include: ᠳᠠᠬᠢ^{⟨?⟩} ‑daki/‑deki (dative-locative or ordinal), ᠳᠠᠭ^{⟨?⟩}/ ᠳᠡᠭ^{⟨?⟩} ‑daɣ/‑deg (regular action), ᠳᠠᠭᠠᠨ^{⟨?⟩}/ ᠳᠡᠭᠡᠨ^{⟨?⟩} ‑daɣan/‑degen (reflexive+dative-locative), ᠳᠤᠭᠠᠷ^{⟨?⟩}/ ᠳᠦᠭᠡᠷ^{⟨?⟩} ‑duɣar/‑düger (ordinal), and ᠳᠤ^{⟨?⟩} ‑du/‑dü or ᠳᠤᠷ^{⟨?⟩} ‑dur/‑dür (dative-locative).)
‑d(...)	‑da, ‑de	‑du, ‑dü	Transliteration
	—	ᠳᠤ^{⟨?⟩}	Whole
	ᠳᠠ‍^{⟨?⟩}	ᠳᠤ‍^{⟨?⟩}	Initial

- Transcribes Chakhar /d/; Khalkha /t/, and /tʰ/. Transliterated into Cyrillic with the letter д.
- Syllable-initially indistinguishable from t. When it must be distinguished from t medially, it can be written twice, and with both medial forms (as in ᠬᠤᠳᠳᠤᠭ qudduɣ 'well', compared with ᠬᠤᠲᠤᠭ qutuɣ 'holy'). Alternatively, a dot is sometimes used to the right of the letter in 19th and 20th century manuscripts.
- The belly-tooth-shaped form is used before consonants (syllable-final), the other before vowels.
- Derived from Old Uyghur taw (𐾀; initial, belly-tooth-shaped medial, and final) and lamedh (𐽸; other medial form).
- Positional variants of lamedh ⟨ᠳ᠋‍/‍ᠲ‍/‍ᠳ᠋⟩ can be used to clarify the spelling of d in words of foreign origin, as in ᠳ᠋ᠣᠻᠲ᠋ᠣᠷ dokhtor 'doctor' (доктор doktor), ᠳᠡᠳ᠋ ded 'the following, the succeeding' (дэд ded), and ᠡᠳ᠋ ed 'goods, property' (distinguishing it from ᠣᠨ on 'year', and retained in derivatives such as ᠡᠳ᠋ᠯᠡᠯ^{⟨?⟩} edlel 'possession' (эдлэл edlel); эд ed).
- Produced with D using the Windows Mongolian keyboard layout.
- In the Mongolian Unicode block, d comes after t and before č.
