= Ja (Mongolic) =

Letter used to write Mongolic and Tungusic languages

Ja is a letter of related and vertically oriented alphabets used to write Mongolic and Tungusic languages.

== Mongolian language ==
Ja

The Mongolian script

Mongolian vowels
ᠠ a	ᠡ e	ᠢ i	ᠣ o	ᠤ u	ᠥ ö	ᠦ ü
ᠧ (ē)

Mongolian consonants
ᠨ n	ᠩ ng	ᠪ b	ᠫ (p)	ᠬ q/k	ᠭ ɣ/g	ᠮ m
ᠯ l	ᠰ s	ᠱ š	ᠲ t	ᠳ d	ᠴ č	ᠵ ǰ
ᠶ y	ᠷ r	ᠸ (w)

Mongolian script multigraphs

Letter
ǰ (j)	Transliteration (Note: Scholarly transliteration, with alternative in parentheses.)
ᠵ‍	Initial
‍ᠵ‍	Medial (syllable-initial)
—	Medial (syllable-final)
(‍ᠵ)	Final (Note: Not found in native Mongolian words.)

C-V syllables
ǰ‑a, ǰ‑e	ǰa, ǰe	ǰi	ǰo	ǰu	ǰö, ǰü	Transliteration
ᠵ᠎ᠠ^{⟨?⟩} ⟨⟩ (Note: As in ǰ‑a (Khalkha: за(а) za(a)) 'well', 'allright'; emphatic final; ǰ‑a particle expressing presumption, probability, or hope; doubt-expressing ǰ‑a and corroborative ǰ‑e particle.)	ᠵᠠ (Note: As in the interjection ᠵᠠ ǰa (Khalkha: заа zaa) 'all right, yes, very good, well!, now then'.)	ᠵᠢ (Note: See the separated ᠶᠢ^{⟨?⟩} ‑yi suffix.)	ᠵᠣ᠋		ᠵᠥ᠋	Alone
ᠵ᠎ᠠ^{⟨?⟩} ⟨⟩	ᠵᠠ	ᠵᠢ	ᠵᠣ (Note: As in ᠵᠣ ǰo (Khalkha: зоо zoo) 'vertebrae'.)	—	ᠵᠥ᠋	Alone
—	ᠵᠠ‍	ᠵᠢ‍	ᠵᠣ‍		ᠵᠥ‍	Initial
—	‍ᠵᠠ‍	‍ᠵᠢ‍	‍ᠵᠣ‍			Medial
—	‍ᠵᠠ	‍ᠵᠢ	‍ᠵᠣ			Final

- Transcribes Chakhar /d͡ʒ/; Khalkha /d͡ʒ/, and d͡z (Mongolian Cyrillic ж, and з, respectively). Transliterated into Cyrillic with the letter ж.
- Derived from Old Uyghur yodh (𐽶; initial), and Old Uyghur (through early Mongolian) tsade (𐽽; medial).
- Produced with J using the Windows Mongolian keyboard layout.
- In the Mongolian Unicode block, ǰ comes after č and before y.
