= Ba (Mongolic) =

Letter used to write Mongolic and Tungusic languages

Ba is a letter of related and vertically oriented alphabets used to write Mongolic and Tungusic languages.

== Mongolian language ==
Ba

The Mongolian script

Mongolian vowels
ᠠ a	ᠡ e	ᠢ i	ᠣ o	ᠤ u	ᠥ ö	ᠦ ü
ᠧ (ē)

Mongolian consonants
ᠨ n	ᠩ ng	ᠪ b	ᠫ (p)	ᠬ q/k	ᠭ ɣ/g	ᠮ m
ᠯ l	ᠰ s	ᠱ š	ᠲ t	ᠳ d	ᠴ č	ᠵ ǰ
ᠶ y	ᠷ r	ᠸ (w)

Mongolian script multigraphs

Letter
b	Transliteration (Note: Scholarly transliteration.)
ᠪ‍	Initial
‍ᠪ‍	Medial (syllable-initial)
‍ᠪ‍	Medial (syllable-final)
‍ᠪ	Final

C-V syllables
ba, be	bi	bo, bu	bö, bü	Transliteration
ᠪᠠ (Note: As in ᠪᠠ ba (Khalkha: ба ba) 'and'.)	ᠪᠢ (Note: As in ᠪᠢ bi (Khalkha: би bi) 'I'.)	ᠪᠣ	ᠪᠥ᠋	Alone
ᠪᠠ‍	ᠪᠢ‍	ᠪᠣ‍	ᠪᠥ‍	Initial
‍ᠪᠠ‍	‍ᠪᠢ‍	‍ᠪᠣ‍		Medial
‍ᠪᠠ	‍ᠪᠢ	‍ᠪᠣ		Final

Separated suffixes (Note: Separated suffixes starting with the letter b include: ᠪᠠᠨ ‑ban/‑ben (reflexive), and ᠪᠠᠷ ‑bar/‑ber (instrumental).)
‑ban, ‑ben	‑bar, ‑ber	Transliteration
ᠪᠠᠨ	ᠪᠠᠷ	Whole

- Transcribes Chakhar /b/; Khalkha /p/, /w/, and /∅/. Transliterated into Cyrillic with the letter б.
- For Classical Mongolian, Latin v is used only for transcribing foreign words, so most в (v) in Mongolian Cyrillic correspond to б (b) in Classical Mongolian.
- Derived from Old Uyghur pe (𐽼).
- Produced with B using the Windows Mongolian keyboard layout.
- In the Mongolian Unicode block, b comes after ng and before p.
