= Pa (Mongolic) =

Letter used to write Mongolic and Tungusic languages

Pa is a letter of related and vertically oriented alphabets used to write Mongolic and Tungusic languages.

== Mongolian language ==
Pa

The Mongolian script

Mongolian vowels
ᠠ a	ᠡ e	ᠢ i	ᠣ o	ᠤ u	ᠥ ö	ᠦ ü
ᠧ (ē)

Mongolian consonants
ᠨ n	ᠩ ng	ᠪ b	ᠫ (p)	ᠬ q/k	ᠭ ɣ/g	ᠮ m
ᠯ l	ᠰ s	ᠱ š	ᠲ t	ᠳ d	ᠴ č	ᠵ ǰ
ᠶ y	ᠷ r	ᠸ (w)

Mongolian script multigraphs

Letter
p	Transliteration (Note: Scholarly transliteration.)
ᠫ‍	Initial
‍ᠫ‍	Medial (syllable-initial)
—	Medial (syllable-final)
(‍ᠫ)	Final (Note: Not found in native Mongolian words.)

C-V syllables
pa, pe	pi	po, pu	pö, pü	Transliteration
ᠫᠠ	ᠫᠢ	ᠫᠣ	ᠫᠥ᠋	Alone
ᠫᠠ‍	ᠫᠢ‍	ᠫᠣ‍	ᠫᠥ‍	Initial
‍ᠫᠠ‍	‍ᠫᠢ‍	‍ᠫᠣ‍		Medial
‍ᠫᠠ	‍ᠫᠢ	‍ᠫᠣ		Final

- Transcribes Chakhar /p/; Khalkha /pʰ/. Transliterated into Cyrillic with the letter п.
- Only at the beginning of Mongolian words (although words with an initial p tend to be foreign).
- Galik letter, derived from Mongolian b.
- Produced with P using the Windows Mongolian keyboard layout.
- In the Mongolian Unicode block, p comes after b and before q/k.
