= Sa (Mongolic) =

Letter used to write Mongolic and Tungusic languages

Sa is a letter of related and vertically oriented alphabets used to write Mongolic and Tungusic languages.

== Mongolian language ==
Sa

The Mongolian script

Mongolian vowels
ᠠ a	ᠡ e	ᠢ i	ᠣ o	ᠤ u	ᠥ ö	ᠦ ü
ᠧ (ē)

Mongolian consonants
ᠨ n	ᠩ ng	ᠪ b	ᠫ (p)	ᠬ q/k	ᠭ ɣ/g	ᠮ m
ᠯ l	ᠰ s	ᠱ š	ᠲ t	ᠳ d	ᠴ č	ᠵ ǰ
ᠶ y	ᠷ r	ᠸ (w)

Mongolian script multigraphs

Letter
s	Transliteration (Note: Scholarly transliteration.)
ᠰ‍	Initial
‍ᠰ‍	Medial (syllable-initial)
‍ᠰ‍	Medial (syllable-final)
‍ᠰ	Final

C-V syllables
s‑a, s‑e	sa, se	si	so, su	sö, sü	Transliteration
—	ᠰᠠ (Note: As in ᠰᠠ sa (Khalkha: саа saa) 'paralysis, palsy'.)	ᠰᠢ	ᠰᠣ᠋	ᠰᠥ᠋	Alone
—	ᠰᠠ‍	ᠰᠢ‍	ᠰᠣ‍	ᠰᠥ‍	Initial
—	‍ᠰᠠ‍	‍ᠰᠢ‍	‍ᠰᠣ‍		Medial
‍ᠰ᠎ᠠ^{⟨?⟩} ⟨⟩	‍ᠰᠠ	‍ᠰᠢ	‍ᠰᠣ		Final

- Transcribes Chakhar /s/, or /ʃ/ before i; Khalkha /s/, or /ʃ/ before i. Before a morpheme boundary, however, there is no change of s to /ʃ/ before an i. Transliterated into Cyrillic with the letter с.
- Derived from Old Uyghur merged samekh and shin (𐽻 and 𐽿).
- Produced with S using the Windows Mongolian keyboard layout.
- In the Mongolian Unicode block, s comes after l and before š.
