= Mongolian script multigraphs =

Letter combinations used for the Mongolian language when written in the Mongolian script

The Mongolian script

Mongolian vowels
ᠠ a	ᠡ e	ᠢ i	ᠣ o	ᠤ u	ᠥ ö	ᠦ ü
ᠧ (ē)

Mongolian consonants
ᠨ n	ᠩ ng	ᠪ b	ᠫ (p)	ᠬ q/k	ᠭ ɣ/g	ᠮ m
ᠯ l	ᠰ s	ᠱ š	ᠲ t	ᠳ d	ᠴ č	ᠵ ǰ
ᠶ y	ᠷ r	ᠸ (w)

Mongolian script multigraphs

This article describes two- and three-letter combinations (so-called digraphs and trigraphs) used for the Mongolian language when written in the Mongolian script.

== Vowel and consonant combinations ==
The intervocalic letters ɣ/g, and y has in some combinations come to help form long vowels, namely:

- Long a with: aɣa, iɣa, iya.
- Long e with: ege, ige, iye.
- Long i with: igi.
- Long o with: oɣa, oɣo, uɣa.
- Long u with: aɣu, iɣu, uɣu.
- Long ö with: öge, üge.
- Long ü with: egü, igü, ügü.

Sometimes intervocalic b and m is silent: as in ᠳᠡᠪᠡᠯ debel (Khalkha: дээл deel) 'robe, garment' or ᠬᠦᠮᠦᠨ kümün (Khalkha: хүн khün) 'human, person; man'.

== Vowel combinations ==
Doubled vowels
ii	oo	uu	üü	Transliteration (Note: Scholarly transliteration.)
ī	ŏ	ū	ǖ	Pronunciation
—	—	ᠤᠤ^{⟨?⟩} ⟨⟩ (Note: Interrogative uu/üü particle (subject to vowel harmony; Khalkha: уу/үү/юу/юү uu/üü/yuu/yuü) used after the predicate. The positional variant ⟨ᠶᠤᠤ⟩ yuu/yüü (Khalkha: юу/юү yuu/yuü) is only used in the modern language.)		Alone
—	—	ᠣᠣ (Note: As in ᠣᠣ/ᠠᠭᠤᠤ uu/aɣuu (Khalkha: —/агуу —/aguu) 'vast, great[ly], large', etc.)	—	Alone
—	—	ᠤᠤ‍	ᠦᠦ‍ (Note: The tooth here is not from the semivowel y but is part of the first vowel itself, it's the only sign that distinguishes a u from a ü. Sample word: ᠦᠷ/ᠦᠦᠷ ür/üür (Khalkha: үүр üür) 'dawn, daybreak'.)	Initial
‍ᠢᠢ‍	‍ᠣᠣ‍ (Note: As in ᠲᠤᠤᠯᠢ tuuli (Khalkha: тууль tuuli) 'old tale, story, epic, epic poem'.)		(‍ᠦ᠋ᠦ‍) (Note: Written with an intervocalic long tooth, as in the loanword ᠫᠦᠳ/ᠫᠦᠦᠳᠡ püd/püüde (Khalkha: пуд pud) 'pud', a Russian weight.)	Medial
—	—	‍ᠤᠤ (Note: Final uu/üü in the prohibitive particle ᠪᠤᠤ buu/büü (Khalkha: бүү büü) 'don't' lacks an intervocalic long tooth. Contrast with the visually similar conjunction ᠪᠤᠶᠤ buyu (Khalkha: буюу buyuu) 'or', and noun ᠬᠦᠦ küü (Khalkha: хүү khüü) 'son, young boy', a colloquial form of ᠬᠥᠪᠡᠭᠦᠨ köbegün (Khalkha: хөвүүн/хөвгүүн khövüün/khövgüün),)		Final

- The doubled vowels ii, uu, and üü mark these out as long. Doubled oo is instead both used in a few words to mark the vowel as short, and to distinguish it from u.

Diphthongs
ai	ei	oi, ui	öi	üi	Transliteration
āi̯	ēi̯	ōi̯, ūi̯	—	ǖi̯	Pronunciation
ᠠᠢ (Note: As in ᠠᠢ ai (Khalkha: ай ai) 'category; sound, noise', or an pity/sympathy/worry-expressing interjection.)	ᠡᠢ (Note: As in ᠡᠢ ei (Khalkha: ий ii), an compassion/sorrow/fright/disgust-expressing interjection.)	ᠣᠢ (Note: As in ᠣᠢ oi (Khalkha: ой oi) 'woods, forest, grove; mind, intellect; memory', or ᠤᠢ ui (Khalkha: уй ui) 'mourning, sorrow'.)	ᠥᠢ (Note: As in ᠥᠢ/ᠥᠶᠢ öi/öyi (Khalkha: өөе ööye), an exclamatory interjection meaning 'hello', 'I say', or 'look here', or ᠦᠢ ᠲᠦᠮᠡᠨ üi (Khalkha: үй üi) tümen 'multitude; innumerable'.)		Alone
ᠠᡳ᠌‍	ᠡᡳ᠌‍	ᠣᡳ᠌‍	—	ᠣᡳ᠌‍	Initial
‍ᠠᡳ᠌‍		‍ᠣᡳ᠌‍	—	‍ᠦᡳ᠌‍	Medial
‍ᠠᠢ		‍ᠣᠢ	—	‍ᠦᠢ	Final

- Most of the i's of these diphthongs derive from an earlier yi, but is no longer recognized as such. The yi origin can for instance be seen in the two long teeth of ᠰᠠᠶᠢᠨ^{⟨?⟩} sayin 'good'. These has become a pair of short and long teeth (᠊‍ᠢ᠋‍) in recent manuscripts. The diphthongs only appears with the single form of i, as in ᠳᠠᠯᠠᠢ dalai̯ 'sea', at the end of words.

Diphthongs, continued
au	eü	u‑a	uu‑a	Transliteration
aū	eǖ	uă/uā	ūā?	Pronunciation
ᠠᠤ‍	—	—	—	Initial
‍ᠠᠤ‍		—	—	Medial
—		‍ᠤ᠎ᠠ^{⟨?⟩} ⟨⟩ (Note: As in the final diphthongs u-a and uu-a.)	‍ᠤᠤ᠎ᠠ^{⟨?⟩}	Final
