= Sha (Mongolic) =

Letter used to write Mongolic and Tungusic languages

Sha is a letter of related and vertically oriented alphabets used to write Mongolic and Tungusic languages.

== Mongolian language ==
Sha

The Mongolian script

Mongolian vowels
ᠠ a	ᠡ e	ᠢ i	ᠣ o	ᠤ u	ᠥ ö	ᠦ ü
ᠧ (ē)

Mongolian consonants
ᠨ n	ᠩ ng	ᠪ b	ᠫ (p)	ᠬ q/k	ᠭ ɣ/g	ᠮ m
ᠯ l	ᠰ s	ᠱ š	ᠲ t	ᠳ d	ᠴ č	ᠵ ǰ
ᠶ y	ᠷ r	ᠸ (w)

Mongolian script multigraphs

Letter
š	Transliteration (Note: Scholarly transliteration.)
ᠱ‍	Initial
‍ᠱ‍	Medial (syllable-initial)
‍ᠱ‍	Medial (syllable-final)
(‍ᠱ)	Final (Note: Not found in native Mongolian words.)

C-V syllables
ša, še	ši	šo	šu	šö, šü	Transliteration
ᠱᠠ (Note: As in ᠱᠠ ša (Khalkha: шаа shaa) 'crape, netting'.)	ᠱᠢ	ᠱᠣ᠋		ᠱᠥ᠋	Alone
ᠱᠠ	ᠱᠢ	ᠱᠣ (Note: As in ᠱᠣ šo (Khalkha: шоо shoo) 'dice, oracle bones'.)	—	ᠱᠥ᠋	Alone
ᠱᠠ‍	ᠱᠢ‍	ᠱᠣ‍		ᠱᠥ‍	Initial
‍ᠱᠠ‍	‍ᠱᠢ‍	‍ᠱᠣ‍			Medial
‍ᠱᠠ	‍ᠱᠢ	‍ᠱᠣ			Final

- Transcribes Chakhar /ʃ/; Khalkha /ʃ/. Transliterated into Cyrillic with the letter ш.
- Final š is only found in modern Mongolian words.
- Derived from Old Uyghur merged samekh and shin (𐽻 and 𐽿).
- Produced with X using the Windows Mongolian keyboard layout.
- In the Mongolian Unicode block, š comes after s and before t.
