= Ma (Mongolic) =

Letter used to write Mongolic and Tungusic languages

Ma is a letter of related and vertically oriented alphabets used to write Mongolic and Tungusic languages.

== Mongolian language ==
Ma

The Mongolian script

Mongolian vowels
ᠠ a	ᠡ e	ᠢ i	ᠣ o	ᠤ u	ᠥ ö	ᠦ ü
ᠧ (ē)

Mongolian consonants
ᠨ n	ᠩ ng	ᠪ b	ᠫ (p)	ᠬ q/k	ᠭ ɣ/g	ᠮ m
ᠯ l	ᠰ s	ᠱ š	ᠲ t	ᠳ d	ᠴ č	ᠵ ǰ
ᠶ y	ᠷ r	ᠸ (w)

Mongolian script multigraphs

Letter
m	Transliteration (Note: Scholarly transliteration.)
ᠮ‍	Initial
‍ᠮ‍	Medial (syllable-initial)
‍ᠮ‍	Medial (syllable-final)
‍ᠮ	Final

C-V syllables
m‑a, m‑e	ma, me	mi	mo, mu	mö, mü	Transliteration
—	ᠮᠠ (Note: As in the exclamation ᠮᠠ/ᠮᠠᠢ ma/mai (Khalkha: ма(й) ma(i)) 'here, take it'.)	ᠮᠢ	ᠮᠣ᠋	ᠮᠥ᠋	Alone
—	ᠮᠠ‍	ᠮᠢ‍	ᠮᠣ‍	ᠮᠥ‍	Initial
—	‍ᠮᠠ‍	‍ᠮᠢ‍	‍ᠮᠣ‍		Medial
‍ᠮ᠎ᠠ^{⟨?⟩} ⟨⟩	‍ᠮᠠ	‍ᠮᠢ	‍ᠮᠣ		Final

- Transcribes Chakhar /m/; Khalkha /m/. Transliterated into Cyrillic with the letter м.
- Derived from Old Uyghur mem (𐽹).
- Produced with M using the Windows Mongolian keyboard layout.
- In the Mongolian Unicode block, m comes after ɣ/g and before l.
