= Wa (Mongolic) =

Letter used to write Mongolic and Tungusic languages

Wa is a letter of related and vertically oriented alphabets used to write Mongolic and Tungusic languages.

== Mongolian language ==
Wa

The Mongolian script

Mongolian vowels
| ᠠ a | ᠡ e | ᠢ i | ᠣ o | ᠤ u | ᠥ ö | ᠦ ü |
| ᠧ (ē) |

Mongolian consonants
| ᠨ n | ᠩ ng | ᠪ b | ᠫ (p) | ᠬ q/k | ᠭ ɣ/g | ᠮ m |
| ᠯ l | ᠰ s | ᠱ š | ᠲ t | ᠳ d | ᠴ č | ᠵ ǰ |
| ᠶ y | ᠷ r | ᠸ (w) |

Mongolian script multigraphs

Letter
| w (v) | Transliteration (Note: Scholarly transliteration, with alternative in parentheses.) |
|---|---|
| ᠸ‍ (Note: As in ᠸᠴᠢᠷ wčir (Khalkha: очир ochir) 'thunderbolt', or ᠸᠢᠸᠠᠩᠬᠢᠷᠢᠳ vivangkirid/wiwanggirid (Khalkha: вивангирид vivangirid) 'prophecy'.) | Initial |
| ‍ᠸ‍ (Note: As in ᠳᠠᠸᠠ dawa (Khalkha: даваа davaa) 'Monday', or ᠫᠠᠸᠯᠣᠸ^{⟨?⟩} pawlow.) | Medial (syllable-initial) |
| ‍ᠸ‍ | Medial (syllable-final) |
| ‍ᠸ^{⟨?⟩} ⟨‍ᠧ⟩ (Note: As in ᠫᠠᠸᠯᠣᠸ^{⟨?⟩} pawlow.) | Final |

C-V syllables
| w‑a, w‑e | wa, we | wi | wo, wu | wö, wü | Transliteration |
|---|---|---|---|---|---|
| — | ᠸᠠ (Note: As in ᠸᠠ/ᠸᠠᠭ᠎ᠠ/ᠸᠠᠭᠠᠯ wa/waɣ‑a/waɣal (Khalkha: ваа/ваал vaa/vaal) 'fungoid growth, mold'.) | ᠸᠢ | ᠸᠣ᠋ | ᠸᠥ᠋ | Alone |
| — | ᠸᠠ‍ | ᠸᠢ‍ | ᠸᠣ‍ | ᠸᠥ‍ | Initial |
| — | ‍ᠸᠠ‍ | ‍ᠸᠢ‍ | ‍ᠸᠣ‍ | | Medial |
| ‍ᠸ᠎ᠠ^{⟨?⟩} ⟨⟩ (Note: As in ᠪᠣᠳᠢᠰᠠᠳ᠋ᠸ᠎ᠠ^{⟨?⟩} bodisad(u/w)‑a (Khalkha: бодисадва bodisadva) 'bodhisattva'.) | ‍ᠸᠠ | ‍ᠸᠢ | ‍ᠸᠣ | | Final |

- Transcribes Chakhar /w/; Transliterated into Cyrillic with the letter в.
- Used to transcribe foreign words (originally for v in Sanskrit व /va/). Transcribes /w/ in Tibetan ཝ /wa/; Old Uyghur and Chinese loanwords.
- Indistinguishable from ē, except when inferred by its placement: typically between vowels, but also when it follows a consonant and precedes a vowel. In many xylographs also indistinguishable from the straight form of y ⟨⟩.
- Derived from Old Uyghur bet (𐽱), and waw (𐽳, before a separated vowel).
- Produced with ⇧ Shift+W using the Windows Mongolian keyboard layout.
- In the Mongolian Unicode block, w comes after r.
