= Ra (Mongolic) =

Letter used to write Mongolic and Tungusic languages

Ra is a letter of related and vertically oriented alphabets used to write Mongolic and Tungusic languages.

== Mongolian language ==
Ra

The Mongolian script

Mongolian vowels
ᠠ a	ᠡ e	ᠢ i	ᠣ o	ᠤ u	ᠥ ö	ᠦ ü
ᠧ (ē)

Mongolian consonants
ᠨ n	ᠩ ng	ᠪ b	ᠫ (p)	ᠬ q/k	ᠭ ɣ/g	ᠮ m
ᠯ l	ᠰ s	ᠱ š	ᠲ t	ᠳ d	ᠴ č	ᠵ ǰ
ᠶ y	ᠷ r	ᠸ (w)

Mongolian script multigraphs

Letter
r	Transliteration (Note: Scholarly transliteration.)
(ᠷ‍)	Initial (Note: Not found in native Mongolian words.)
‍ᠷ‍	Medial (syllable-initial)
‍ᠷ‍	Medial (syllable-final)
‍ᠷ	Final

C-V syllables
r‑a, r‑e	ra, re	ri	ro, ru	rö, rü	Transliteration
—	ᠷᠠ	ᠷᠢ	ᠷᠣ᠋	ᠷᠥ᠋	Alone
—	ᠷᠠ‍	ᠷᠢ‍	ᠷᠣ‍	ᠷᠥ‍	Initial
—	‍ᠷᠠ‍	‍ᠷᠢ‍	‍ᠷᠣ‍		Medial
‍ᠷ᠎ᠠ^{⟨?⟩} ⟨⟩	‍ᠷᠠ	‍ᠷᠢ	‍ᠷᠣ		Final

- Transcribes Chakhar /r/; Khalkha /r/. Transliterated into Cyrillic with the letter р.
- Not occurring word-initially except in loanwords.
- Derived from Old Uyghur resh (𐽾).
- Produced with R using the Windows Mongolian keyboard layout.
- In the Mongolian Unicode block, r comes after y and before w.
