= La (Mongolic) =

Letter used to write Mongolic and Tungusic languages

La is a letter of related and vertically oriented alphabets used to write Mongolic and Tungusic languages.

== Mongolian language ==
La

The Mongolian script

Mongolian vowels
| ᠠ a | ᠡ e | ᠢ i | ᠣ o | ᠤ u | ᠥ ö | ᠦ ü |
| ᠧ (ē) |

Mongolian consonants
| ᠨ n | ᠩ ng | ᠪ b | ᠫ (p) | ᠬ q/k | ᠭ ɣ/g | ᠮ m |
| ᠯ l | ᠰ s | ᠱ š | ᠲ t | ᠳ d | ᠴ č | ᠵ ǰ |
| ᠶ y | ᠷ r | ᠸ (w) |

Mongolian script multigraphs

Letter
| l | Transliteration (Note: Scholarly transliteration.) |
|---|---|
| (ᠯ‍) | Initial (Note: Not found in native Mongolian words.) |
| ‍ᠯ‍ | Medial (syllable-initial) |
| ‍ᠯ‍ | Medial (syllable-final) |
| ‍ᠯ | Final |

C-V syllables
| l‑a, l‑e | la, le | li | lo, lu | lö, lü | Transliteration |
|---|---|---|---|---|---|
| — | ᠯᠠ (Note: As in the intensifying ⟨ᠯᠠ⟩ / ᠡᠯᠡ la/le / ele (Khalkha: л l) particle, or ᠯᠠ la (Khalkha: лаа(н) laa(n)) 'candle'.) | ᠯᠢ | ᠯᠣ᠋ | ᠯᠥ᠋ | Alone |
| — | ᠯᠠ‍ | ᠯᠢ‍ | ᠯᠣ‍ | ᠯᠥ‍ | Initial |
| — | ‍ᠯᠠ‍ | ‍ᠯᠢ‍ | ‍ᠯᠣ‍ | | Medial |
| ‍ᠯ᠎ᠠ^{⟨?⟩} ⟨⟩ | ‍ᠯᠠ | ‍ᠯᠢ | ‍ᠯᠣ | | Final |

Separated suffixes (Note: Separated suffixes starting with the letter l include: ᠯᠤᠭ᠎ᠠ^{⟨?⟩}/ ᠯᠦᠭᠡ^{⟨?⟩} ‑luɣ‑a/‑lüge (comitative).)
| ‑lu, ‑lü | Transliteration |
|---|---|
| ᠯᠤ‍ | Initial |

- Transcribes Chakhar /l/; Khalkha /ɮ/. Transliterated into Cyrillic with the letter л.
- Not occurring word-initially in native words.
- Forms a ligature with a preceding bow-shaped consonant in loanwords such as ᠪᠯᠠᠮ᠎ᠠ^{⟨?⟩} blam-a 'lama' from Tibetan བླ་མ་ Wylie: bla-ma.
- Derived from Old Uyghur hooked resh (𐾁).
- Produced with L using the Windows Mongolian keyboard layout.
- In the Mongolian Unicode block, l comes after m and before s.
