= Na (Mongolic) =

Letter used to write Mongolic and Tungusic languages

Na is a letter of related and vertically oriented alphabets used to write Mongolic and Tungusic languages.

== Mongolian language ==
Na

The Mongolian script

Mongolian vowels
ᠠ a	ᠡ e	ᠢ i	ᠣ o	ᠤ u	ᠥ ö	ᠦ ü
ᠧ (ē)

Mongolian consonants
ᠨ n	ᠩ ng	ᠪ b	ᠫ (p)	ᠬ q/k	ᠭ ɣ/g	ᠮ m
ᠯ l	ᠰ s	ᠱ š	ᠲ t	ᠳ d	ᠴ č	ᠵ ǰ
ᠶ y	ᠷ r	ᠸ (w)

Mongolian script multigraphs

Letter
n	Transliteration (Note: Scholarly transliteration.)
ᠨ‍	Initial
‍ᠨ᠋‍^{⟨?⟩} ⟨⟩	Medial (syllable-initial)
‍ᠨ‍^{⟨?⟩} ⟨⟩	Medial (syllable-final)
‍ᠨ	Final

C-V syllables
n‑a, n‑e	na, ne	ni	no, nu	nö, nü	Transliteration
—	ᠨᠠ	ᠨᠢ (Note: As in ᠨᠢ ni (Khalkha: нь ni), a modern form used in place of ᠠᠨᠤ anu 'their' and ᠢᠨᠤ inu 'his'.)	ᠨᠣ᠋	ᠨᠥ᠋	Alone
—	ᠨᠠ‍	ᠨᠢ‍	ᠨᠣ‍	ᠨᠥ‍	Initial
—	‍ᠨᠠ‍	‍ᠨᠢ‍	‍ᠨᠣ‍		Medial
‍ᠨ᠎ᠠ^{⟨?⟩} ⟨⟩	‍ᠨᠠ	‍ᠨᠢ	‍ᠨᠣ		Final

Separated suffixes (Note: Separated suffixes starting with the letter n include: ᠨᠠᠷ ‑nar/‑ner or ᠨᠤᠭᠤᠳ/ ᠨᠦᠭᠦᠳ^{⟨?⟩} ‑nuɣud/‑nügüd (plural).)
‑na, ‑ne	‑nu, ‑nü	Transliteration
ᠨᠠ‍	ᠨᠤ‍	Initial

- Transcribes Chakhar /n/; Khalkha /n/, and /ŋ/. Transliterated into Cyrillic with the letter н.
- Distinction from other tooth-shaped letters by position in syllable sequence.
- Dotted before a vowel (attached or separated); undotted before a consonant (syllable-final) or a whitespace. Final dotted n is also found in modern Mongolian words. A dotted pre-consonantal variant can be used to clarify the spelling of n in words of foreign origin.
- Derived from Old Uyghur nun (𐽺).
- Produced with N using the Windows Mongolian keyboard layout.
- In the Mongolian Unicode block, n comes after ē and before ng.
