= Zero (linguistics) =

Absence in linguistics

In linguistics, a zero or null is a segment that is not pronounced or written. It is a useful concept in analysis, usually written with the symbol "∅", indicating the absence of an element where one might be expected.

There are several kinds of zero:

- In phonetics and phonology, a null phoneme or zero phone indicates that no phone is produced where one might be expected. For example, in syllable structure analysis, a null onset indicates that a syllable lacks an initial consonant (onset) that is normally required by the phonotactics of the considered language. For example, see Standard Chinese phonology#Zero onset.
- In morphology, a zero morph, consisting of no phonetic form, is an allomorph of a morpheme that is otherwise realized in speech. In the phrase two sheep ∅, the plural marker is a zero morph (see nouns with identical singular and plural forms), which is an allomorph of -s as in two cows. In the phrase I like-∅ it, the verb conjugation has a zero affix, as opposed to the third-person singular present -s in he likes it.
- In grammar, a zero pronoun occurs in some languages. In the English sentence nobody knows ∅ that the zero pronoun plays the role of the object of the verb, and in ∅ makes no difference that it plays the role of the subject. Likewise, the zero pronoun in the book ∅ I am reading plays the role of the relative pronoun in the book that I am reading. In generative grammar, this is also referred to as PRO. In pronoun-dropping languages, including null subject languages such as most Romance languages, the zero pronoun is a prominent feature.
- A zero subordinate conjunction occurs in English in sentences like I know ∅ he likes me, in which the zero conjunction plays the role of the subordinate conjunction that in I know that he likes me.
- A zero article is an unrealized indefinite or definite article in some languages, such as the plural indefinite article in English.
- A zero copula, in which a copula such as the verb to be is implied but absent. For example, in Russian the copula is usually omitted in the present tense, as in Она красивая (literally: 'She beautiful'). In English the copula is sometimes omitted in some nonstandard dialects.

== Symbol ==
It is usually written with the Unicode character U+2205 ∅ EMPTY SET (&empty;, &emptyset;, &emptyv;, &varnothing;). An alternative ad hoc solution is to use the Scandinavian capital letter Ø instead.

== See also ==
- Empty string
- Zero consonant
- Silent letter
- Zero-marking in English
- Zero-marking language
- Markedness
