= Mongolian (Unicode block) =

- Range: U+1800..U+18AF (176 code points)
- Plane: BMP
- Scripts: Mongolian (155 char.); Common (3 char.)
- Major alphabets: Mongolian; Manchu
- Assigned: 158 code points
- Unused: 18 reserved code points

Unicode Version History
- 3.0 (1999): 155 (+155)
- 5.1 (2008): 156 (+1)
- 11.0 (2018): 157 (+1)
- 14.0 (2021): 158 (+1)

Unicode documentation
- Code chart ∣ Web page

Mongolian is a Unicode block containing characters for dialects of Mongolian, Manchu, and Sibe languages. It is traditionally written in vertical lines Top-Down, right across the page, although the Unicode code charts cite the characters rotated to horizontal orientation as this is the orientation of glyphs in a font that supports layout in vertical orientation.

The block has dozens of variation sequences defined for standardized variants.

== Block ==
Mongolian^{[1]}^{[2]}^{[3]} Official Unicode Consortium code chart (PDF)
	0	1	2	3	4	5	6	7	8	9	A	B	C	D	E	F
U+180x	᠀	᠁	᠂	᠃	᠄	᠅	᠆	᠇	᠈	᠉	᠊	FVS; 1	FVS; 2	FVS; 3	MVS	FVS; 4
U+181x	᠐	᠑	᠒	᠓	᠔	᠕	᠖	᠗	᠘	᠙						
U+182x	ᠠ	ᠡ	ᠢ	ᠣ	ᠤ	ᠥ	ᠦ	ᠧ	ᠨ	ᠩ	ᠪ	ᠫ	ᠬ	ᠭ	ᠮ	ᠯ
U+183x	ᠰ	ᠱ	ᠲ	ᠳ	ᠴ	ᠵ	ᠶ	ᠷ	ᠸ	ᠹ	ᠺ	ᠻ	ᠼ	ᠽ	ᠾ	ᠿ
U+184x	ᡀ	ᡁ	ᡂ	ᡃ	ᡄ	ᡅ	ᡆ	ᡇ	ᡈ	ᡉ	ᡊ	ᡋ	ᡌ	ᡍ	ᡎ	ᡏ
U+185x	ᡐ	ᡑ	ᡒ	ᡓ	ᡔ	ᡕ	ᡖ	ᡗ	ᡘ	ᡙ	ᡚ	ᡛ	ᡜ	ᡝ	ᡞ	ᡟ
U+186x	ᡠ	ᡡ	ᡢ	ᡣ	ᡤ	ᡥ	ᡦ	ᡧ	ᡨ	ᡩ	ᡪ	ᡫ	ᡬ	ᡭ	ᡮ	ᡯ
U+187x	ᡰ	ᡱ	ᡲ	ᡳ	ᡴ	ᡵ	ᡶ	ᡷ	ᡸ							
U+188x	ᢀ	ᢁ	ᢂ	ᢃ	ᢄ	ᢅ	ᢆ	ᢇ	ᢈ	ᢉ	ᢊ	ᢋ	ᢌ	ᢍ	ᢎ	ᢏ
U+189x	ᢐ	ᢑ	ᢒ	ᢓ	ᢔ	ᢕ	ᢖ	ᢗ	ᢘ	ᢙ	ᢚ	ᢛ	ᢜ	ᢝ	ᢞ	ᢟ
U+18Ax	ᢠ	ᢡ	ᢢ	ᢣ	ᢤ	ᢥ	ᢦ	ᢧ	ᢨ	ᢩ	ᢪ					
Notes 1.As of Unicode version 17.0 2.Grey areas indicate non-assigned code points 3.The Unicode presentation form of U+1824 MONGOLIAN LETTER U is U+1824 FVS1 ᠤ᠋ Second Isolate Form, to distinguish it from the visually identical U+1823 MONGOLIAN LETTER O. For the same reason, the Unicode presentation form of U+1826 MONGOLIAN LETTER UE is U+1826 FVS2 ᠦ᠌ Third Isolate Form. See document N4752R2.

== Presentation forms ==
Vowels
Letter	Subset	Unicode	Isolate	Initial	Medial	Final
A	Basic	1820	ᠠ	ᠠ‍	‍ᠠ‍	‍ᠠ
A	Basic	1820 180B	ᠠ᠋	—N/a	‍ᠠ᠋‍	‍ᠠ᠋
A	Basic	1820 180C	—N/a		‍ᠠ᠌‍	—N/a
E	Basic	1821	ᠡ	ᠡ‍	‍ᠡ‍	‍ᠡ
E	Basic	1821 180B	—N/a	ᠡ᠋‍	—N/a	‍ᠡ᠋
E	Todo	1844	ᡄ	ᡄ‍	‍ᡄ‍	—N/a
E	Todo	1844 180B	—N/a		‍ᡄ᠋‍	—N/a
E	Sibe	185D	ᡝ	ᡝ‍	‍ᡝ‍	‍ᡝ
E	Sibe	185D 180B	—N/a		‍ᡝ᠋‍	‍ᡝ᠋
EE	Basic	1827	ᠧ	ᠧ‍	‍ᠧ‍	‍ᠧ
I	Basic	1822	ᠢ	ᠢ‍	‍ᠢ‍	‍ᠢ
I	Basic	1822 180B	—N/a		‍ᠢ᠋‍	—N/a
I	Todo	1845	ᡅ	ᡅ‍	‍ᡅ‍	‍ᡅ
I	Todo	1845 180B	—N/a		‍ᡅ᠋‍	—N/a
I	Sibe	185E	ᡞ	ᡞ‍	‍ᡞ‍	‍ᡞ
I	Sibe	185E 180B	—N/a		‍ᡞ᠋‍	‍ᡞ᠋
I	Sibe	185E 180C	—N/a		‍ᡞ᠌‍	‍ᡞ᠌
I	Manchu	1873	ᡳ	ᡳ‍	‍ᡳ‍	‍ᡳ
I	Manchu	1873 180B	—N/a		‍ᡳ᠋‍	‍ᡳ᠋
I	Manchu	1873 180C	—N/a		‍ᡳ᠌‍	‍ᡳ᠌
I	Manchu	1873 180D	—N/a		‍ᡳ᠍‍	—N/a
IY	Sibe	185F	ᡟ	—N/a	‍ᡟ‍	‍ᡟ
O	Basic	1823	ᠣ	ᠣ‍	‍ᠣ‍	‍ᠣ
O	Basic	1823 180B	—N/a		‍ᠣ᠋‍	‍ᠣ᠋
O	Todo	1846	ᡆ	ᡆ‍	‍ᡆ‍	‍ᡆ
O	Todo	1846 180B	—N/a		‍ᡆ᠋‍	—N/a
OE	Basic	1825	ᠥ	ᠥ‍	‍ᠥ‍	‍ᠥ
OE	Basic	1825 180B	—N/a		‍ᠥ᠋‍	‍ᠥ᠋
OE	Basic	1825 180C	—N/a		‍ᠥ᠌‍	—N/a
OE	Todo	1848	ᡈ	ᡈ‍	‍ᡈ‍	‍ᡈ
OE	Todo	1848 180B	—N/a		‍ᡈ᠋‍	—N/a
U	Basic	1824	ᠤ	ᠤ‍	‍ᠤ‍	‍ᠤ
U	Basic	1824 180B	—N/a		‍ᠤ᠋‍	—N/a
U	Todo	1847	ᡇ	ᡇ‍	‍ᡇ‍	‍ᡇ
U	Todo	1847 180B	ᡇ᠋	—N/a	‍ᡇ᠋‍	‍ᡇ᠋
U	Todo	1847 180C	—N/a		‍ᡇ᠌‍	—N/a
U	Sibe	1861	ᡡ	ᡡ‍	‍ᡡ‍	‍ᡡ
UE	Basic	1826	ᠦ	ᠦ‍	‍ᠦ‍	‍ᠦ
UE	Basic	1826 180B	ᠦ᠋	—N/a	‍ᠦ᠋‍	‍ᠦ᠋
UE	Basic	1826 180C	—N/a		‍ᠦ᠌‍	—N/a
UE	Todo	1849	ᡉ	ᡉ‍	‍ᡉ‍	‍ᡉ
UE	Todo	1849 180B	ᡉ᠋	—N/a	‍ᡉ᠋‍	—N/a
UE	Sibe	1860	ᡠ	ᡠ‍	‍ᡠ‍	‍ᡠ
UE	Sibe	1860 180B	—N/a		‍ᡠ᠋‍	‍ᡠ᠋
Long vowel sign	Todo	1843	—N/a		‍ᡃ᠋‍	‍ᡃ᠋

Consonants
Letter	Subset	Unicode	Isolate	Initial	Medial	Final
NA	Basic	1828	ᠨ	ᠨ‍	‍ᠨ‍	‍ᠨ
NA	Basic	1828 180B	—N/a	ᠨ᠋‍	‍ᠨ᠋‍	—N/a
NA	Basic	1828 180C	—N/a		‍ᠨ᠌‍	—N/a
NA	Basic	1828 180D	—N/a		‍ᠨ᠍‍	—N/a
ANG	Basic	1829	ᠩ	—N/a	‍ᠩ‍	‍ᠩ
ANG	Todo	184A 180B	ᡊ	—N/a	‍ᡊ‍	‍ᡊ
ANG	Sibe	1862 180B	ᡢ	—N/a	‍ᡢ‍	‍ᡢ
BA	Basic	182A	ᠪ	ᠪ‍	‍ᠪ‍	‍ᠪ
BA	Basic	182A 180B	—N/a			‍ᠪ᠋
BA	Todo	184B	ᡋ	ᡋ‍	‍ᡋ‍	‍ᡋ
PA	Basic	182B	ᠫ	ᠫ‍	‍ᠫ‍	‍ᠫ
PA	Todo	184C	ᡌ	ᡌ‍	‍ᡌ‍	‍ᡌ
PA	Sibe	1866	ᡦ	ᡦ‍	‍ᡦ‍	—N/a
QA	Basic	182C	ᠬ	ᠬ‍	‍ᠬ‍	—N/a
QA	Basic	182C 180B	ᠬ᠋	ᠬ᠋‍	‍ᠬ᠋‍	—N/a
QA	Basic	182C 180C	—N/a		‍ᠬ᠌‍	—N/a
QA	Basic	182C 180D	—N/a		‍ᠬ᠍‍	—N/a
QA	Todo	184D	ᡍ	ᡍ‍	‍ᡍ‍	‍ᡍ
QA	Todo	184D 180B	—N/a	ᡍ᠋‍	‍ᡍ᠋‍	—N/a
GA	Basic	182D	ᠭ	ᠭ‍	‍ᠭ‍	‍ᠭ
GA	Basic	182D 180B	—N/a	ᠭ᠋‍	‍ᠭ᠋‍	‍ᠭ᠋
GA	Basic	182D 180C	—N/a		‍ᠭ᠌‍	—N/a
GA	Basic	182D 180D	—N/a		‍ᠭ᠍‍	—N/a
GA	Todo	184E	ᡎ	ᡎ‍	‍ᡎ‍	‍ᡎ
GA	Todo	184E 180B	—N/a		‍ᡎ᠋‍	—N/a
GA	Sibe	1864	ᡤ	ᡤ‍	‍ᡤ‍	—N/a
MA	Basic	182E	ᠮ	ᠮ‍	‍ᠮ‍	‍ᠮ
MA	Todo	184F	ᡏ	ᡏ‍	‍ᡏ‍	‍ᡏ
LA	Basic	182F	ᠯ	ᠯ‍	‍ᠯ‍	‍ᠯ
SA	Basic	1830	ᠰ	ᠰ‍	‍ᠰ‍	‍ᠰ
SA	Basic	1830 180B	—N/a			‍ᠰ᠋
SA	Basic	1830 180C	—N/a			‍ᠰ᠌
SHA	Basic	1831	ᠱ	ᠱ‍	‍ᠱ‍	‍ᠱ
SHA	Basic	1878 (Note: U+1878 ᡸ MONGOLIAN LETTER CHA WITH TWO DOTS is used historically for Buryat.)	ᡸ	ᡸ‍	‍ᡸ‍	‍ᡸ
SHA	Sibe	1867	ᡧ	ᡧ‍	‍ᡧ‍	‍ᡧ
TA	Basic	1832	ᠲ	ᠲ‍	‍ᠲ‍	‍ᠲ
TA	Basic	1832 180B	—N/a		‍ᠲ᠋‍	—N/a
TA	Todo	1850	ᡐ	ᡐ‍	‍ᡐ‍	‍ᡐ
TA	Sibe	1868	ᡨ	ᡨ‍	‍ᡨ‍	‍ᡨ
TA	Sibe	1868 180B	—N/a	ᡨ᠋‍	‍ᠲ᠋‍	—N/a
TA	Sibe	1868 180C	—N/a		‍ᡨ᠌‍	—N/a
DA	Basic	1833	ᠳ	ᠳ‍	‍ᠳ‍	‍ᠳ
DA	Basic	1833 180B	—N/a	ᠳ᠋‍	‍ᠳ᠋‍	‍ᠳ᠋
DA	Todo	1851	ᡑ	ᡑ‍	‍ᡑ‍	‍ᡑ
DA	Sibe	1869	ᡩ	ᡩ‍	‍ᡩ‍	—N/a
DA	Sibe	1869 180B	—N/a	ᡩ᠋‍	‍ᡩ᠋‍	—N/a
CHA	Basic	1834	ᠴ	ᠴ‍	‍ᠴ‍	‍ᠴ
CHA	Todo	1852	ᡒ	ᡒ‍	‍ᡒ‍	‍ᡒ
CHA	Sibe	1871	ᡱ	ᡱ‍	‍ᡱ‍	—N/a
JA	Basic	1835	ᠵ	ᠵ‍	‍ᠵ‍	‍ᠵ
JA	Basic	1835 180B	—N/a		‍ᠵ᠋‍	—N/a
JA	Todo	1853	ᡓ	ᡓ‍	‍ᡓ‍	‍ᡓ
JA	Sibe	186A	ᡪ	ᡪ‍	‍ᡪ‍	—N/a
YA	Basic	1836	ᠶ	ᠶ‍	‍ᠶ‍	—N/a
YA	Basic	1836 180B	—N/a	ᠶ᠋‍	‍ᠶ᠋‍	—N/a
YA	Basic	1836 180C	—N/a		‍ᠶ᠌‍	—N/a
YA	Todo	1855	ᡕ	ᡕ‍	‍ᡕ‍	—N/a
RA	Basic	1837	ᠷ	ᠷ‍	‍ᠷ‍	‍ᠷ
RA	Manchu	1875	ᡵ	ᡵ‍	‍ᡵ‍	‍ᡵ
RAA	Sibe	1870	ᡰ	ᡰ‍	—N/a	
WA	Basic	1838	ᠸ	ᠸ‍	‍ᠸ‍	‍ᠸ
WA	Basic	1838 180B	—N/a		—N/a	‍ᠸ᠋
WA	Todo	1856	ᡖ	ᡖ‍	‍ᡖ‍	‍ᡖ
FA	Basic	1839	ᠹ	ᠹ‍	‍ᠹ‍	‍ᠹ
FA	Sibe	186B	ᡫ	ᡫ‍	‍ᡫ‍	—N/a
FA	Manchu	1876	ᡶ	ᡶ‍	‍ᡶ‍	—N/a
FA	Manchu	1876 180B	—N/a	ᡶ᠋‍	‍ᡶ᠋‍	—N/a
KA	Basic	183A	ᠺ	ᠺ‍	‍ᠺ‍	‍ᠺ
KA	Todo	1857	ᡗ	ᡗ‍	‍ᡗ‍	‍ᡗ
KA	Sibe	1863	ᡣ	ᡣ‍	‍ᡣ‍	‍ᡣ
KA	Sibe	1863 180B	—N/a		‍ᡣ᠋‍	—N/a
KA	Manchu	1874	ᡴ	ᡴ‍	‍ᡴ‍	‍ᡴ
KA	Manchu	1874 180B	—N/a		‍ᡴ᠋‍	‍ᡴ᠋
KA	Manchu	1874 180C	—N/a		‍ᡴ᠌‍	‍ᡴ᠌
KA	Manchu	1874 180D	—N/a		‍ᡴ᠍‍	—N/a
KHA	Basic	183B	ᠻ	ᠻ‍	‍ᠻ‍	‍ᠻ
GAA	Todo	1858	ᡘ	ᡘ‍	—N/a	
GAA	Sibe	186C	ᡬ	ᡬ‍	—N/a	
TSA	Basic	183C	ᠼ	ᠼ‍	‍ᠼ‍	‍ᠼ
TSA	Todo	1854	ᡔ	ᡔ‍	‍ᡔ‍	‍ᡔ
TSA	Sibe	186E	ᡮ	ᡮ‍	‍ᡮ‍	—N/a
ZA	Basic	183D	ᠽ	ᠽ‍	‍ᠽ‍	‍ᠽ
ZA	Sibe	186F	ᡯ	ᡯ‍	‍ᡯ‍	—N/a
ZA	Sibe	186F 180B	—N/a	ᡯ᠋‍	‍ᡯ᠋‍	—N/a
HAA	Basic	183E	ᠾ	ᠾ‍	‍ᠾ‍	‍ᠾ
HAA	Todo	1859	ᡙ	ᡙ‍	‍ᡙ‍	‍ᡙ
HAA	Sibe	186D	ᡭ	ᡭ‍	—N/a	
HA	Sibe	1865	ᡥ	ᡥ‍	‍ᡥ‍	—N/a
ZRA	Basic	183F	ᠿ	ᠿ‍	‍ᠿ‍	‍ᠿ
ZHA	Sibe	1872	ᡲ	ᡲ‍	‍ᡲ‍	—N/a
ZHA	Manchu	1877	ᡷ	ᡷ‍	‍ᡷ‍	—N/a
LHA	Basic	1840	ᡀ	ᡀ‍	‍ᡀ‍	—N/a
ZHI	Basic	1841	ᡁ	ᡁ‍	—N/a	
CHI	Basic	1842	ᡂ	ᡂ‍	—N/a	
JIA	Todo	185A	ᡚ	ᡚ‍	—N/a	
NIA	Todo	185B	ᡛ	ᡛ‍	—N/a	
DZA	Todo	185C	ᡜ	ᡜ‍	‍ᡜ‍	‍ᡜ

=== Extensions for Sanskrit and Tibetan ===
Vowels
Letter	Subset	Unicode	Isolate	Initial	Medial	Final
A	Basic	1887	ᢇ	—N/a		‍ᢇ
A	Basic	1887 180B	ᢇ᠋	—N/a		‍ᢇ᠋
A	Basic	1887 180C	—N/a			‍ᢇ᠌
A	Basic	1887 180D	—N/a			‍ᢇ᠍
I	Basic	1888	ᢈ	—N/a		‍ᢈ
I	Basic	1888 180B	—N/a			‍ᢈ᠋
AH	Basic	1897	ᢗ	ᢗ‍	—N/a	
Half U	Basic	18A6	ᢦ	ᢦ‍	—N/a	
Half YA	Basic	18A7	ᢧ	ᢧ‍	—N/a	

Consonants
Letter	Subset	Unicode	Isolate	Initial	Medial	Final
KA	Basic	1889	ᢉ	ᢉ‍	—N/a	
NGA	Basic	188A	—N/a	ᢊ‍	‍ᢊ‍	—N/a
NGA	Basic	188A 180B	—N/a	ᢊ᠋‍	‍ᢊ᠋‍	—N/a
NGA	Manchu	189B	—N/a	ᢛ‍	‍ᢛ‍	—N/a
CA	Basic	188B	—N/a	ᢋ‍	‍ᢋ‍	—N/a
CA	Manchu	189C	—N/a	ᢜ‍	‍ᢜ‍	—N/a
TTA	Basic	188C	ᢌ	ᢌ‍	—N/a	
TTA	Manchu	189E	—N/a	ᢞ‍	‍ᢞ‍	—N/a
TTHA	Basic	188D	ᢍ	ᢍ‍	—N/a	
DDA	Basic	188E	ᢎ	ᢎ‍	—N/a	
NNA	Basic	188F	ᢏ	ᢏ‍	—N/a	
TA	Basic	1890	ᢐ	ᢐ‍	—N/a	
TA	Todo	1898	ᢘ	ᢘ‍	—N/a	
TA	Manchu	18A0	ᢠ	ᢠ‍	—N/a	
DA	Basic	1891	ᢑ	ᢑ‍	—N/a	
PA	Basic	1892	ᢒ	ᢒ‍	—N/a	
PHA	Basic	1893	ᢓ	ᢓ‍	—N/a	
SSA	Basic	1894	—N/a	ᢔ‍	‍ᢔ‍	—N/a
SSA	Manchu	18A2	—N/a	ᢢ‍	‍ᢢ‍	—N/a
ZHA	Basic	1895	ᢕ	ᢕ‍	—N/a	
ZHA	Todo	1899	ᢙ	ᢙ‍	—N/a	
ZHA	Manchu	18A4	—N/a	ᢤ‍	‍ᢤ‍	—N/a
ZA	Basic	1896	—N/a	ᢖ‍	‍ᢖ‍	—N/a
ZA	Manchu	18A5	—N/a	ᢥ‍	‍ᢥ‍	—N/a
GHA	Manchu	189A	—N/a	ᢚ‍	‍ᢚ‍	—N/a
JHA	Manchu	189D	—N/a	ᢝ‍	‍ᢝ‍	—N/a
DDHA	Manchu	189F	—N/a	ᢟ‍	‍ᢟ‍	—N/a
DHA	Manchu	18A1	—N/a	ᢡ‍	‍ᢡ‍	—N/a
CYA	Manchu	18A3	—N/a	ᢣ‍	‍ᢣ‍	—N/a
BHA	Manchu	18A8	ᢨ	ᢨ‍	—N/a	
LHA	Manchu	18AA	—N/a	ᢪ‍	‍ᢪ‍	—N/a

Signs and marks
Letter	Subset	Unicode	Isolate	Initial	Medial	Final
Anusvara; One	Basic	1880	ᢀ	—N/a		
Anusvara; One	Basic	1880 180B	ᢀ᠋	—N/a		
Visarga; One	Basic	1881	ᢁ	—N/a		
Visarga; One	Basic	1881 180B	ᢁ᠋	—N/a		
Damaru	Basic	1882	ᢂ	—N/a		
Ubadama	Basic	1883	ᢃ	—N/a		
Inverted; Ubadama	Basic	1884	ᢄ	—N/a		
Baluda	Basic	1885	ᢅ	—N/a		
Three; Baluda	Basic	1886	ᢆ	—N/a		

== Variations and vowel separation ==
The Mongolian Unicode block contains its own variation selectors (listed as format controls) for use with the traditional Mongolian alphabet:

- U+180B ᠋ MONGOLIAN FREE VARIATION SELECTOR ONE (FSV1)
- U+180C ᠌ MONGOLIAN FREE VARIATION SELECTOR TWO (FSV2)
- U+180D ᠍ MONGOLIAN FREE VARIATION SELECTOR THREE (FSV3)
- U+180E ᠎ MONGOLIAN VOWEL SEPARATOR (MVS)
- U+180F ᠏ MONGOLIAN FREE VARIATION SELECTOR FOUR (FSV4)

Additional variations may be also available for characters according to context or by manually using special characters, namely the zero-width joiner (ZWJ) and zero-width non-joiner (ZWNJ), to select the specific form.

== History ==
The following Unicode-related documents record the purpose and process of defining specific characters in the Mongolian block:

Version	Final code points (Note: Proposed code points and characters names may differ from final code points and names)	Count	UTC ID	L2 ID	WG2 ID	Document
3.0	U+1800..180E, 1810..1819, 1820..1877, 1880..18A9	155		X3L2/90-124	N667	"38. 38. Mongolian script", Minutes of SC2/WG2 Meeting 18 in Munich, 1990-11-12
3.0	U+1800..180E, 1810..1819, 1820..1877, 1880..18A9	155		X3L2/93-066	N836	Whistler, Ken (1992-06-27), Proposal for disposition of Chinese Comments on Mongolian characters in DIS 1.2
3.0	U+1800..180E, 1810..1819, 1820..1877, 1880..18A9	155		X3L2/94-086	N1011	A proposal about installing Mongolian, Todo, Xibe (Manchu included) scripts into ISO/IEC 10646 BMP, 1994-04-18
3.0	U+1800..180E, 1810..1819, 1820..1877, 1880..18A9	155		X3L2/94-098	N1033 (pdf, doc)	Umamaheswaran, V. S.; Ksar, Mike (1994-06-01), "8.4.2", Unconfirmed Minutes of ISO/IEC JTC 1/SC 2/WG 2 Meeting 25, Falez Hotel, Antalya, Turkey, 1994-04-18--22
3.0	U+1800..180E, 1810..1819, 1820..1877, 1880..18A9	155			N1098	Zhongxiao, Shi (October 1994), Proposal for encoding Mongolian, Todo and Xibe characters on BMP of ISO/IEC 10646
3.0	U+1800..180E, 1810..1819, 1820..1877, 1880..18A9	155	UTC/1995-054			"Mongolian", Unicode Technical Committee Meeting #66, Draft Minutes, 1995-09-29
3.0	U+1800..180E, 1810..1819, 1820..1877, 1880..18A9	155		X3L2/95-133		Correspondence from the National Body of Mongolia regarding Coded character set for the Mongolian Script, 1995-10-23
3.0	U+1800..180E, 1810..1819, 1820..1877, 1880..18A9	155		X3L2/96-054	N1368	Mongolian script proposal, 1996-04-10
3.0	U+1800..180E, 1810..1819, 1820..1877, 1880..18A9	155		X3L2/96-055	N1383	Ad hoc report on Mongolian script - Copenhagen meeting, 1996-04-25
3.0	U+1800..180E, 1810..1819, 1820..1877, 1880..18A9	155			N1353	Umamaheswaran, V. S.; Ksar, Mike (1996-06-25), "8.12", Draft minutes of WG2 Copenhagen Meeting # 30
3.0	U+1800..180E, 1810..1819, 1820..1877, 1880..18A9	155		X3L2/96-102	N1437	Report of 3rd international Mongolian encoding meeting, 1996-08-06
3.0	U+1800..180E, 1810..1819, 1820..1877, 1880..18A9	155		X3L2/96-103	N1438	Draft on encoding Mongolian character set, 1996-08-08
3.0	U+1800..180E, 1810..1819, 1820..1877, 1880..18A9	155		X3L2/96-113		Mao, Yong Gang (1996-11-10), About the function of identifiers of Mongolian Proposal
3.0	U+1800..180E, 1810..1819, 1820..1877, 1880..18A9	155			N1453	Ksar, Mike; Umamaheswaran, V. S. (1996-12-06), "8.1", WG 2 Minutes - Quebec Meeting 31
3.0	U+1800..180E, 1810..1819, 1820..1877, 1880..18A9	155		X3L2/96-123		Aliprand, Joan; Winkler, Arnold (1996-12-18), "4.3 Mongolian", Preliminary Minutes - UTC #71 & X3L2 #168 ad hoc meeting, San Diego - December 5-6, 1996
3.0	U+1800..180E, 1810..1819, 1820..1877, 1880..18A9	155		L2/97-028	N1497	Moore, Richard; et al. (1997-01-10), On the Use of Control Symbols in the Mongolian Script Encoding
3.0	U+1800..180E, 1810..1819, 1820..1877, 1880..18A9	155		L2/97-035	N1515	Moore, Richard; et al. (1997-01-23), Report of the ad-hoc group on Mongolian encoding
3.0	U+1800..180E, 1810..1819, 1820..1877, 1880..18A9	155		L2/97-030	N1503 (pdf, doc)	Umamaheswaran, V. S.; Ksar, Mike (1997-04-01), "8.8", Unconfirmed Minutes of WG 2 Meeting #32, Singapore; 1997-01-20--24
3.0	U+1800..180E, 1810..1819, 1820..1877, 1880..18A9	155		L2/97-152	N1607	Mongolian proposal review, 1997-06-20
3.0	U+1800..180E, 1810..1819, 1820..1877, 1880..18A9	155		L2/97-165	N1622	Corff, Oliver (1997-07-03), Comments on Technical Issues of Mongolian in N 1515 and N1607
3.0	U+1800..180E, 1810..1819, 1820..1877, 1880..18A9	155		L2/97-288	N1603	Umamaheswaran, V. S. (1997-10-24), "8.18", Unconfirmed Meeting Minutes, WG 2 Meeting # 33, Heraklion, Crete, Greece, 20 June – 4 July 1997
3.0	U+1800..180E, 1810..1819, 1820..1877, 1880..18A9	155		L2/98-088	N1711	The Working Meeting on Mongolian Encoding Attended by Representatives of China and Mongolia, 1998-02-15
3.0	U+1800..180E, 1810..1819, 1820..1877, 1880..18A9	155		L2/98-104	N1734	Whistler, Ken (1998-03-20), Comments on the Mongolian Encoding Proposal, WG2 N1711
3.0	U+1800..180E, 1810..1819, 1820..1877, 1880..18A9	155		L2/98-252 (pdf, txt)	N1833RM (pdf, doc)	Moore, Richard (1998-05-04), Feedback on Ken Whistler's Comments on Mongolian Encoding: N 1734
3.0	U+1800..180E, 1810..1819, 1820..1877, 1880..18A9	155		L2/98-158		Aliprand, Joan; Winkler, Arnold (1998-05-26), "Mongolian", Draft Minutes – UTC #76 & NCITS Subgroup L2 #173 joint meeting, Tredyffrin, Pennsylvania, April 20-22, 1998
3.0	U+1800..180E, 1810..1819, 1820..1877, 1880..18A9	155		L2/98-286	N1703	Umamaheswaran, V. S.; Ksar, Mike (1998-07-02), "8.2", Unconfirmed Meeting Minutes, WG 2 Meeting #34, Redmond, WA, USA; 1998-03-16--20
3.0	U+1800..180E, 1810..1819, 1820..1877, 1880..18A9	155		L2/98-251 (pdf, html, txt)	N1808 (pdf, doc)	Reply to "Proposal WG2 N1734" Raised at the Seattle Meeting Regarding "Proposal WG 2 N1711", 1998-07-09
3.0	U+1800..180E, 1810..1819, 1820..1877, 1880..18A9	155		L2/98-272		Choijingzhab (1998-07-26), Mongolian: China's comments to Richard Moore's feedback in L2/98-252
3.0	U+1800..180E, 1810..1819, 1820..1877, 1880..18A9	155		L2/98-268R		Whistler, Ken (1998-07-30), Analysis and UTC Position Regarding Mongolian Encoding Issues
3.0	U+1800..180E, 1810..1819, 1820..1877, 1880..18A9	155		L2/98-281R (pdf, html)		Aliprand, Joan (1998-07-31), "Mongolian (IV.A)", Unconfirmed Minutes – UTC #77 & NCITS Subgroup L2 # 174 JOINT MEETING, Redmond, WA -- July 29-31, 1998
3.0	U+1800..180E, 1810..1819, 1820..1877, 1880..18A9	155			N1862	Revision of N1711 - Mongolian, 1998-09-17
3.0	U+1800..180E, 1810..1819, 1820..1877, 1880..18A9	155			N1865	US Position - Mongolian (N1711, N1734 and N1808), 1998-09-18
3.0	U+1800..180E, 1810..1819, 1820..1877, 1880..18A9	155		L2/98-369	N1878	Report of the meetings of the ad-hoc group on Mongolian; London; 21/22 September, 1998, 1998-09-23
3.0	U+1800..180E, 1810..1819, 1820..1877, 1880..18A9	155		L2/98-326		Subdivision Proposal on JTC 1.02.18.01 for Amendment 29: Mongolian to ISO/IEC 10646-1, 1998-10-28
3.0	U+1800..180E, 1810..1819, 1820..1877, 1880..18A9	155		L2/98-327		Combined PDAM registration and consideration ballot on WD for ISO/IEC 10646-1/Amd. 29, AMENDMENT 29: Mongolian, 1998-10-28
3.0	U+1800..180E, 1810..1819, 1820..1877, 1880..18A9	155			N1918	Paterson, Bruce (1998-10-28), Text for Combined PDAM registration and consideration ballot - SC2 N 3208
3.0	U+1800..180E, 1810..1819, 1820..1877, 1880..18A9	155		L2/99-010	N1903 (pdf, html, doc)	Umamaheswaran, V. S. (1998-12-30), "8.1.3", Minutes of WG 2 meeting 35, London, U.K.; 1998-09-21--25
3.0	U+1800..180E, 1810..1819, 1820..1877, 1880..18A9	155		L2/99-075.1	N1973	Irish Comments on SC 2 N 3208, 1999-01-19
3.0	U+1800..180E, 1810..1819, 1820..1877, 1880..18A9	155		L2/99-074		Summary of Voting on SC 2 N 3207, Subdivision Proposal on JTC 1.02.18.01 for Amendment 29: Mongolian, 1999-02-12
3.0	U+1800..180E, 1810..1819, 1820..1877, 1880..18A9	155		L2/99-075	N1972 (pdf, html, doc)	Summary of Voting on SC 2 N 3208, PDAM ballot on WD for ISO/IEC 10646-1/Amd. 29: Mongolian, 1999-02-12
3.0	U+1800..180E, 1810..1819, 1820..1877, 1880..18A9	155			N2020	Paterson, Bruce (1999-04-05), FPDAM 29 Text - Mongolian
3.0	U+1800..180E, 1810..1819, 1820..1877, 1880..18A9	155		L2/99-113		Text for FPDAM ballot of ISO/IEC 10646, Amd. 29 - Mongolian, 1999-04-06
3.0	U+1800..180E, 1810..1819, 1820..1877, 1880..18A9	155		L2/99-232	N2003	Umamaheswaran, V. S. (1999-08-03), "6.1.3 PDAM29 – Mongolian script", Minutes of WG 2 meeting 36, Fukuoka, Japan, 1999-03-09--15
3.0	U+1800..180E, 1810..1819, 1820..1877, 1880..18A9	155		L2/99-254	N2068	Summary of Voting on SC 2 N 3308, ISO 10646-1/FPDAM 29 - Mongolian, 1999-08-19
3.0	U+1800..180E, 1810..1819, 1820..1877, 1880..18A9	155		L2/99-303	N2125	Disposition of Comments Report on SC 2 N 3308, ISO/IEC 10646-1/FPDAM 29 AMD. 29: Mongolian, 1999-09-20
3.0	U+1800..180E, 1810..1819, 1820..1877, 1880..18A9	155		L2/99-304	N2126	Paterson, Bruce (1999-10-01), Revised Text for FDAM ballot of ISO/IEC 10646-1/FDAM 29, AMENDMENT 29: Mongolian
3.0	U+1800..180E, 1810..1819, 1820..1877, 1880..18A9	155		L2/99-381		Final text for ISO/IEC 10646-1, FDAM 29 -- Mongolian, 1999-12-07
3.0	U+1800..180E, 1810..1819, 1820..1877, 1880..18A9	155		L2/00-010	N2103	Umamaheswaran, V. S. (2000-01-05), "6.4.4", Minutes of WG 2 meeting 37, Copenhagen, Denmark: 1999-09-13—16
3.0	U+1800..180E, 1810..1819, 1820..1877, 1880..18A9	155		L2/00-046		Summary of FDAM voting: ISO 10646 Amendment 29: Mongolian, 2000-02-15
3.0	U+1800..180E, 1810..1819, 1820..1877, 1880..18A9	155		L2/03-065		Nelson, Paul; Freytag, Asmus (2003-02-13), Use of ZWJ/ZWNJ with Mongolian Variant Selectors and Vowel Separator
3.0	U+1800..180E, 1810..1819, 1820..1877, 1880..18A9	155		L2/03-073		Partridge, Tim (2003-02-27), Error Report on Linebreaking of Mongolian Vowel Separator
3.0	U+1800..180E, 1810..1819, 1820..1877, 1880..18A9	155		L2/03-039R		Moore, Lisa (2003-03-14), "Properties - Mongolian Vowel Separator", UTC #94 Minutes
3.0	U+1800..180E, 1810..1819, 1820..1877, 1880..18A9	155		L2/05-378		Muller, Eric (2005-12-05), Proposal to change the script property for three Mongolian punctuation marks
3.0	U+1800..180E, 1810..1819, 1820..1877, 1880..18A9	155		L2/06-008R2		Moore, Lisa (2006-02-13), "B.14.2", UTC #106 Minutes
3.0	U+1800..180E, 1810..1819, 1820..1877, 1880..18A9	155		L2/10-279		Batjargal, Biligsaikhan; et al. (2010-07-30), Mongolian Script Rendering Issues
3.0	U+1800..180E, 1810..1819, 1820..1877, 1880..18A9	155		L2/11-401		Iancu, Laurențiu (2011-10-19), Proposal to assign the Extender property to U+180A MONGOLIAN NIRUGU
3.0	U+1800..180E, 1810..1819, 1820..1877, 1880..18A9	155		L2/12-202		Esfahbod, Behdad (2012-06-01), Proposal to Add Mongolian Letters to ArabicShaping.txt
3.0	U+1800..180E, 1810..1819, 1820..1877, 1880..18A9	155		L2/12-360		Esfahbod, Behdad; Pournader, Roozbeh (2012-11-05), Mongolian and 'Phags-Pa Shaping
3.0	U+1800..180E, 1810..1819, 1820..1877, 1880..18A9	155		L2/12-343R2		Moore, Lisa (2012-12-04), "Properties — Mongolian Shaping", UTC #133 Minutes
3.0	U+1800..180E, 1810..1819, 1820..1877, 1880..18A9	155		L2/13-004		Esfahbod, Behdad (2012-12-20), Proposal to change General Category of MONGOLIAN VOWEL SEPARATOR from Zs to Cf
3.0	U+1800..180E, 1810..1819, 1820..1877, 1880..18A9	155		L2/13-011		Moore, Lisa (2013-02-04), "Consensus 134-C16", UTC #134 Minutes, "Change the general category of U+180E MONGOLIAN VOWEL SEPARATOR from Zs to Cf, for Unicode 6.3."
3.0	U+1800..180E, 1810..1819, 1820..1877, 1880..18A9	155		L2/13-146	N4435	Suignard, Michel (2013-05-27), Presentation of vertical scripts
3.0	U+1800..180E, 1810..1819, 1820..1877, 1880..18A9	155		L2/13-132		Moore, Lisa (2013-07-29), "B.1.7 Presentation of vertical scripts", UTC #136 Minutes
3.0	U+1800..180E, 1810..1819, 1820..1877, 1880..18A9	155		L2/14-031		Bell, Aaron; Eck, Greg; Glass, Andrew (2014-01-20), Proposal to update the code charts for Mongolian
3.0	U+1800..180E, 1810..1819, 1820..1877, 1880..18A9	155			N4403 (pdf, doc)	Umamaheswaran, V. S. (2014-01-28), "11.1.2 Presentation of Vertical scripts (Mongolian and Phags-pa)", Unconfirmed minutes of WG 2 meeting 61, Holiday Inn, Vilnius, Lithuania; 2013-06-10/14
3.0	U+1800..180E, 1810..1819, 1820..1877, 1880..18A9	155		L2/15-304		Suignard, Michel (2015-08-27), Draft Mongolian variation selectors
3.0	U+1800..180E, 1810..1819, 1820..1877, 1880..18A9	155		L2/16-041R		Eck, Greg (2016-01-26), Mongolian discussion documents
3.0	U+1800..180E, 1810..1819, 1820..1877, 1880..18A9	155		L2/16-004		Moore, Lisa (2016-02-01), "Consensus 146-C14", UTC #146 Minutes, "Change general category of U+1885 and U+1886 from "Lo" to "Mn", bidi from "L" to "NSM", in Unicode 9.0."
3.0	U+1800..180E, 1810..1819, 1820..1877, 1880..18A9	155		L2/16-258	N4752R2	Eck, Greg (2016-09-19), Mongolian Base Forms, Positional Forms, & Variant Forms
3.0	U+1800..180E, 1810..1819, 1820..1877, 1880..18A9	155		L2/16-259	N4753	Eck, Greg; Rileke, Orlog Ou (2016-09-20), WG2 #65 Mongolian Discussion Points
3.0	U+1800..180E, 1810..1819, 1820..1877, 1880..18A9	155		L2/16-266	N4763	Anderson, Deborah; Whistler, Ken; McGowan, Rick; Pournader, Roozbeh; Glass, Andrew; Iancu, Laurențiu; Moore, Lisa (2016-09-26), "1. Mongolian", Comments on Mongolian, Small Khitan, and other WG2 #65 documents
3.0	U+1800..180E, 1810..1819, 1820..1877, 1880..18A9	155			N4873R (pdf, doc)	"10.3.12", Unconfirmed minutes of WG 2 meeting 65, 2018-03-16
3.0	U+1800..180E, 1810..1819, 1820..1877, 1880..18A9	155		L2/16-297	N4769	Anderson, Deborah (2016-10-27), Mongolian ad hoc report
3.0	U+1800..180E, 1810..1819, 1820..1877, 1880..18A9	155		L2/16-342		Anderson, Deborah; Whistler, Ken; Pournader, Roozbeh; Glass, Andrew; Iancu, Laurențiu (2016-11-07), "11. Mongolian", Recommendations to UTC #149 November 2016 on Script Proposals
3.0	U+1800..180E, 1810..1819, 1820..1877, 1880..18A9	155		L2/16-325		Moore, Lisa (2016-11-18), "C.5.4", UTC #149 Minutes
3.0	U+1800..180E, 1810..1819, 1820..1877, 1880..18A9	155		L2/17-037		Anderson, Deborah; Whistler, Ken; Pournader, Roozbeh; Glass, Andrew; Iancu, Laurențiu; Moore, Lisa; Liang, Hai; Ishida, Richard; Misra, Karan; McGowan, Rick (2017-01-21), "12.b", Recommendations to UTC #150 January 2017 on Script Proposals
3.0	U+1800..180E, 1810..1819, 1820..1877, 1880..18A9	155		L2/17-016		Moore, Lisa (2017-02-08), "Consensus 150-C25", UTC #150 Minutes, "Update Standardizedvariants.txt for Mongolian per document L2/17-035R, for Unicode 10.0."
3.0	U+1800..180E, 1810..1819, 1820..1877, 1880..18A9	155		L2/17-035R2		Dorji, Munkhdelger; Eck, Greg; Sanlig, Badral (2017-04-30), Modify Standardizedvariants.txt file In the Mongolian/Todo Block U+1800 – U+185C PHASE II - Revised
3.0	U+1800..180E, 1810..1819, 1820..1877, 1880..18A9	155		L2/17-170		Liang, Hai (2017-05-12), A minimum set of glyph corrections needed for the 10.0 beta Mongolian code chart
3.0	U+1800..180E, 1810..1819, 1820..1877, 1880..18A9	155		L2/17-103		Moore, Lisa (2017-05-18), "C.5.8", UTC #151 Minutes
3.0	U+1800..180E, 1810..1819, 1820..1877, 1880..18A9	155		L2/18-115		Moore, Lisa (2018-05-09), "Action item 155-A34", UTC #155 Minutes, "Add an annotation to Nameslist to note that TODO SOFT HYPHEN is also used for Hudum, for Unicode 11.0."
3.0	U+1800..180E, 1810..1819, 1820..1877, 1880..18A9	155		L2/19-122		Moore, Lisa (2019-05-08), "B.14.1.1", UTC #159 Minutes
3.0	U+1800..180E, 1810..1819, 1820..1877, 1880..18A9	155		L2/19-297		Liang, Hai (2019-07-26), "3.1 Eligible for a future revision of the chart font [Affects U+1834, U+1871, and U+1878]", Preliminary analysis of L2/19-221 (WG2 N5073), China national body's comments on Mongolian
3.0	U+1800..180E, 1810..1819, 1820..1877, 1880..18A9	155		L2/19-270		Moore, Lisa (2019-10-07), "Consensus 60-C20", UTC #160 Minutes
3.0	U+1800..180E, 1810..1819, 1820..1877, 1880..18A9	155		L2/26-163		Jiang, Kushim (2026-05-29), Proposal to update the Mongolian variant data in UCD
3.0	U+1800..180E, 1810..1819, 1820..1877, 1880..18A9	155		L2/26-158		Kučera, Jan; et al. (2026-07-27), "5.3 Mongolian standardized variants in UCD", Recommendations to UTC #188 (July 2026) on Script Proposals
3.0	U+1800..180E, 1810..1819, 1820..1877, 1880..18A9	155		L2/26-151		Leroy, Robin (2026-07-30), "D.1 Section 5.3 Mongolian standardized variants in UCD", UTC #188 meeting minutes
5.1	U+18AA	1		L2/06-013	N3041	West, Andrew (2006-01-23), Proposal to encode one Manchu ali gali letter
5.1	U+18AA	1		L2/06-008R2		Moore, Lisa (2006-02-13), "C.12", UTC #106 Minutes
5.1	U+18AA	1		L2/06-285	N3092	Supporting references for WG2 N3041, Manchu Ali Gali, 2006-03-27
5.1	U+18AA	1			N3103 (pdf, doc)	Umamaheswaran, V. S. (2006-08-25), "M48.23", Unconfirmed minutes of WG 2 meeting 48, Mountain View, CA, USA; 2006-04-24/27
11.0	U+1878	1		L2/17-007	N4781	West, Andrew; Zhamsoev, Amgalan; Zaytsev, Viacheslav (2017-01-13), Proposal to encode one historical Mongolian letter for Buryat Mongolian
11.0	U+1878	1		L2/17-016		Moore, Lisa (2017-02-08), "C.5.1", UTC #150 Minutes
11.0	U+1878	1		L2/19-297		Liang, Hai (2019-07-26), "3.1 Eligible for a future revision of the chart font [Affects U+1834, U+1871, and U+1878]", Preliminary analysis of L2/19-221 (WG2 N5073), China national body's comments on Mongolian
11.0	U+1878	1		L2/19-270		Moore, Lisa (2019-10-07), "Consensus 60-C20", UTC #160 Minutes
14.0	U+180F	1		L2/20-057		Liang, Hai (2020-01-23), Proposal to add Mongolian Free Variation Selector Four
14.0	U+180F	1		L2/20-015R		Moore, Lisa (2020-05-14), "Consensus 162-C25", Draft Minutes of UTC Meeting 162
