= Mongolian script =

Writing system

Mongolian script ᠮᠣᠩᠭᠣᠯ ᠪᠢᠴᠢᠭ
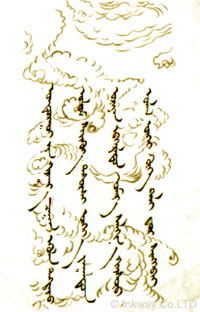
- Poem composed and brush-written by Injinash, 19th century
- Script type: Alphabet
- Creator: Tata-tonga
- Period: c. 1204–1941 (common use); 1941–present (common use in Inner Mongolia; chiefly ceremonial use in Mongolia)
- Direction: Vertical top-to-bottom, left-to-right
- Languages: Mongolian language

Related scripts
- Parent systems: Egyptian hieroglyphs: Proto-Sinaitic alphabet; Phoenician alphabet; Aramaic alphabet; Syriac alphabet; Sogdian alphabet; Old Uyghur alphabet; Mongolian script
- Child systems: Galik alphabet; Manchu alphabet; Dagur alphabet; Xibe alphabet; Clear Script (Oirat alphabet); Vagindra script (Buryat alphabet); Evenki alphabet

ISO 15924
- ISO 15924: Mong (145), Mongolian

Unicode
- Unicode alias: Mongolian
- Unicode range: U+1800–U+18AF Mongolian; U+11660–U+1167F Mong. Supplement

The traditional Mongolian script, (Note: In Mongolian script: ᠮᠣᠩᠭᠣᠯ ᠪᠢᠴᠢᠭ ⟨ ⟩ mongɣol bičig; in Mongolian Cyrillic: Khalkha: монгол бичиг mongol bichig [ˈmɔɴɢɜɮ ˈpiʰt͡ɕɪ̥k]) also known as the Hudum Mongol bichig, (Note: /ˈhʊdəm ˈmɒŋɡəl ˈbɪtʃɪɡ/; in Mongolian script: ᠬᠤᠳᠤᠮ ᠮᠣᠩᠭᠣᠯ ᠪᠢᠴᠢᠭ qudum mongɣol bičig; Khalkha: Khalkha: худам монгол бичиг, khudam mongol bichig [ˈχʊt(ə)m ˈmɔɴɢɜɮ ˈpiʰt͡ɕɪ̥k]; Buryat: Худам Монгол бэшэг, Hudam Mongol bèšèg; Kalmyk: Хуудм Моңһл бичг, Huudm Mon̦ḥl bičg) was the first writing system created specifically for the Mongolian language, and was the most widespread until the introduction of Cyrillic in 1946. The script is a co-official script in Mongolia since 2025, alongside the Cyrillic script for the language. It is also the official written form being taught in schools for Mongolian ethnic students in the Inner Mongolia Autonomous Region of the People's Republic of China. It is traditionally written in vertical lines from top to bottom, flowing in lines from left to right. Derived from the Old Uyghur alphabet, it is a true alphabet, with separate letters for consonants and vowels. It has been adapted for such languages as Oirat and Manchu. Alphabets based on this classical vertical script continue to be used in Mongolia and Inner Mongolia to write Mongolian, Xibe and, experimentally, Evenki.

Computer operating systems have been slow to adopt support for the Mongolian script; almost all have incomplete support or other text rendering difficulties.

== History ==
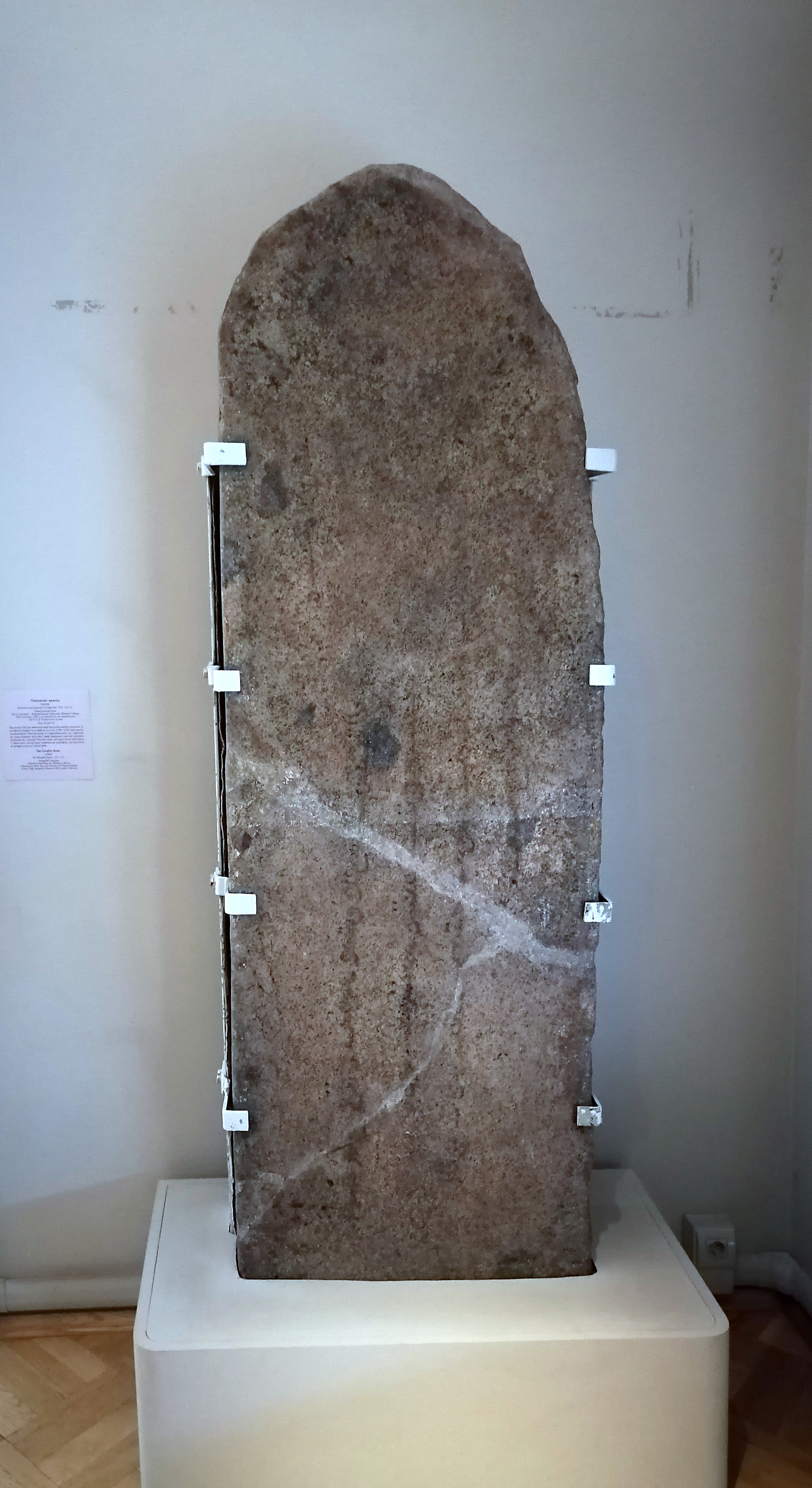
The so-called Stone of Genghis Khan or Stele of Yisüngge, with the earliest known inscription in the Mongolian script.

The Mongolian vertical script developed as an adaptation of the Old Uyghur alphabet for the Mongolian language. Tata-tonga, a 13th-century Uyghur scribe captured by Genghis Khan, was responsible for bringing the Old Uyghur alphabet to the Mongolian Plateau and adapting it to the form of the Mongolian script.

From the seventh and eighth to the fifteenth and sixteenth centuries, the Mongolian language separated into southern, eastern and western dialects. The principal documents from the period of the Middle Mongol language are: in the eastern dialect, the famous text The Secret History of the Mongols, monuments in the Square script, materials of the Chinese–Mongolian glossary of the fourteenth century and materials of the Mongolian language of the middle period in Chinese transcription, etc.; in the western dialect, materials of the Arab–Mongolian and Persian–Mongolian dictionaries, Mongolian texts in Arabic transcription, etc. The main features of the period are that the vowels ï and i had lost their phonemic significance, creating the i phoneme (in the Chakhar dialect, the Standard Mongolian in Inner Mongolia, these vowels are still distinct); inter-vocal consonants ɣ/g, b/w had disappeared and the preliminary process of the formation of Mongolian long vowels had begun; the initial h was preserved in many words; grammatical categories were partially absent, etc. The development over this period explains why the Mongolian script looks like a vertical Arabic script (in particular the presence of the dot system).

Eventually, minor concessions were made to the differences between the Uyghur and Mongol languages: In the 17th and 18th centuries, smoother and more angular versions of the letter tsadi became associated with /dʒ/ and /tʃ/ respectively, and in the 19th century, the Manchu hooked yodh was adopted for initial /j/. Zain was dropped as it was redundant for /s/. Various schools of orthography, some using diacritics, were developed to avoid ambiguity.

Words are written vertically from top to bottom, flowing in lines from left to right. The Old Uyghur script and its descendants, of which traditional Mongolian is one among Oirat Clear, Manchu, and Buryat are the only known vertical scripts written from left to right. This developed because the Uyghurs rotated their Sogdian-derived script, originally written right to left, 90 degrees counterclockwise to emulate Chinese writing, but without changing the relative orientation of the letters.

The reed pen was the writing instrument of choice until the 18th century, when the brush took its place under Chinese influence. Pens were also historically made of wood, bamboo, bone, bronze, or iron. Ink used was black or cinnabar red, and written with on birch bark, paper, cloths made of silk or cotton, and wooden or silver plates.

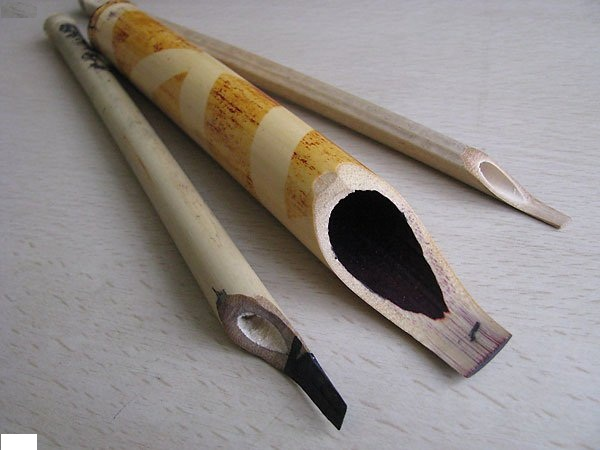
Reed pens

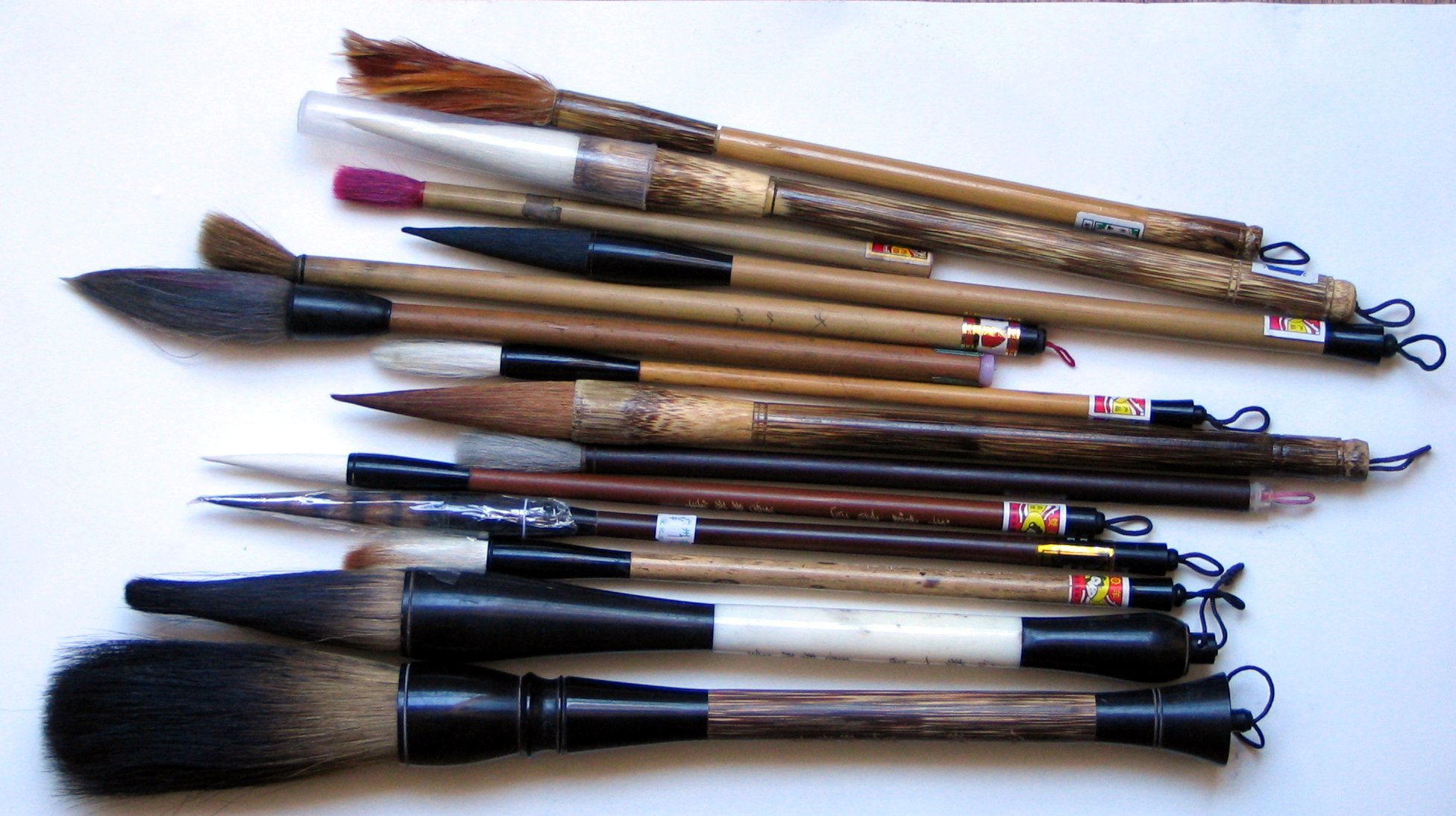
Ink brushes

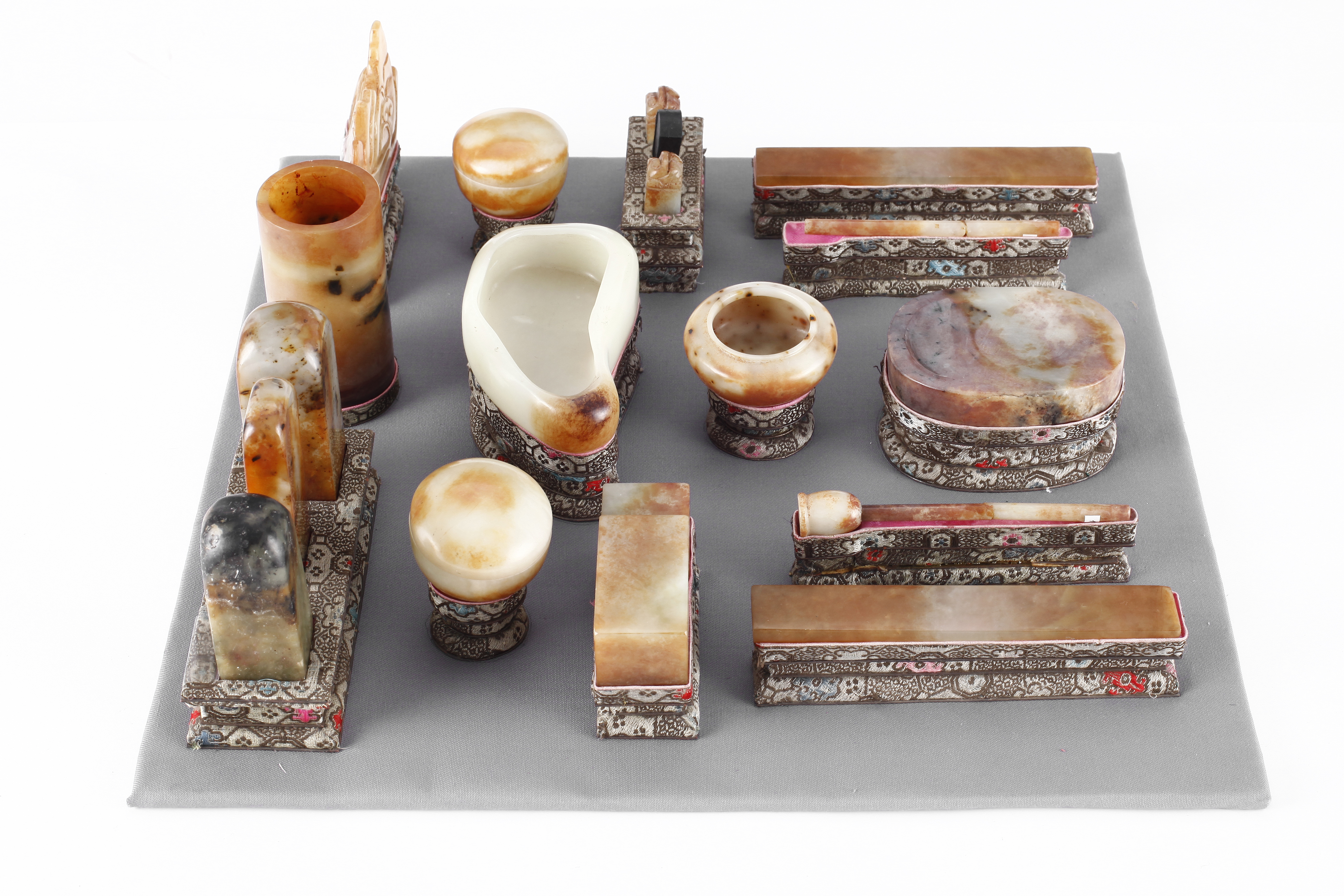
Writing implements of the Bogd Khan

Mongols learned their script as a syllabary, dividing the syllables into twelve different classes, based on the final phonemes of the syllables, all of which ended in vowels.

The script remained in continuous use by Mongolian speakers in Inner Mongolia in the People's Republic of China. In the Mongolian People's Republic, it was largely replaced by the Mongolian Cyrillic alphabet, although the vertical script remained in limited use. In March 2020, the Mongolian government announced plans to increase the use of the traditional Mongolian script and to use both Cyrillic and Mongolian script in official documents by 2025. Due to the particularity of the traditional Mongolian script, a large part (40%) of the Sinicized Mongols in China are unable to read or write this script, and in many cases the script is only used symbolically on plaques in many cities.

== Names ==
The script is known by a wide variety of names. As it was derived from the Old Uyghur alphabet, the Mongol script is known as the Uighur(-)Mongol script. (Note: ᠤᠶᠢᠭᠤᠷᠵᠢᠨ ᠮᠣᠩᠭᠣᠯ ᠪᠢᠴᠢᠭ uyiɣurǰin mongɣol bičig (Khalkha: уйгар/уйгаржин/уйгуржин монгол бичиг/үсэг uigar/uigarjin/uigurjin mongol bichig/üseg)) From 1941 onwards, it became known as the Old Script, (Note: ᠬᠠᠭᠤᠴᠢᠨ ᠪᠢᠴᠢᠭ qaɣučin bičig (Khalkha: хуучин бичиг khuuchin bichig)) in contrast to the New Script, (Note: ᠰᠢᠨᠡ/ᠰᠢᠨ᠎ᠡ ᠪᠢᠴᠢᠭ sine/sin‑e bičig (Khalkha: шинэ үсэг shine üseg)) referring to Cyrillic. The Mongolian script is also known as the Hudum or 'not exact' script, (Note: ᠬᠤᠳᠤᠮ ᠮᠣᠩᠭᠣᠯ ᠪᠢᠴᠢᠭ qudum mongɣol bičig (Khalkha: худам монгол бичиг khudam mongol bichig)) in comparison with the Todo 'clear, exact' script, (Note: ᠲᠣᠳᠣ ᠪᠢᠴᠢᠭ/ᠦᠰᠦᠭ todo bičig/üsüg (Khalkha: тод бичиг/үсэг tod bichig/üseg)) and also as 'vertical script'. (Note: ᠪᠣᠱᠤᠭ᠎ᠠ ᠪᠢᠴᠢᠭ bošuɣ-a bičig (Khalkha: босоо бичиг bosoo bichig))

== Overview ==
The traditional or classical Mongolian alphabet, sometimes called Hudum 'traditional' in Oirat in contrast to the Clear script (Todo 'exact'), is the original form of the Mongolian script used to write the Mongolian language. It does not distinguish several vowels (o/u, ö/ü, final a/e) and consonants (syllable-initial t/d and k/g, sometimes ǰ/y) that were not required for Uyghur, which was the source of the Mongol (or Uyghur-Mongol) script. The result is somewhat comparable to the situation of English, which must represent ten or more vowels with only five letters and uses the digraph th for two distinct sounds. Ambiguity is sometimes prevented by context, as the requirements of vowel harmony and syllable sequence usually indicate the correct sound. Moreover, as there are few words with an exactly identical spelling, actual ambiguities are rare for a reader who knows the orthography.

Letters have different forms depending on their position in a word: initial, medial, or final. In some cases, additional graphic variants are selected for visual harmony with the subsequent character.

The rules for writing below apply specifically for the Mongolian language, unless stated otherwise.

=== Vowel harmony ===
Mongolian vowel harmony separates the vowels of words into three groups – two mutually exclusive and one neutral:

- The back, male, masculine, hard, or yang vowels a, o, and u.
- The front, female, feminine, soft, or yin vowels e, ö, and ü.
- The neutral vowel i, able to appear in all words.

Any Mongolian word can contain the neutral vowel i, but only vowels from either of the other two groups. The vowel qualities of visually separated vowels and suffixes must likewise harmonize with those of the preceding word stem. Such suffixes are written with front or neutral vowels when preceded by a word stem containing only neutral vowels. Any of these rules might not apply for foreign words however.

=== Separated final vowels ===
A separated final form of vowels a or e (᠎ᠠ^{⟨?⟩} ‑a/‑e) is common, and can appear at the end of a word stem, or suffix. This form requires a final-shaped preceding letter, and a word-internal gap in between. This gap can be transliterated with a hyphen. (Note: In digital typesetting, this shaping is achieved by inserting a U+180E ᠎ MONGOLIAN VOWEL SEPARATOR (MVS) between the separated letters.)

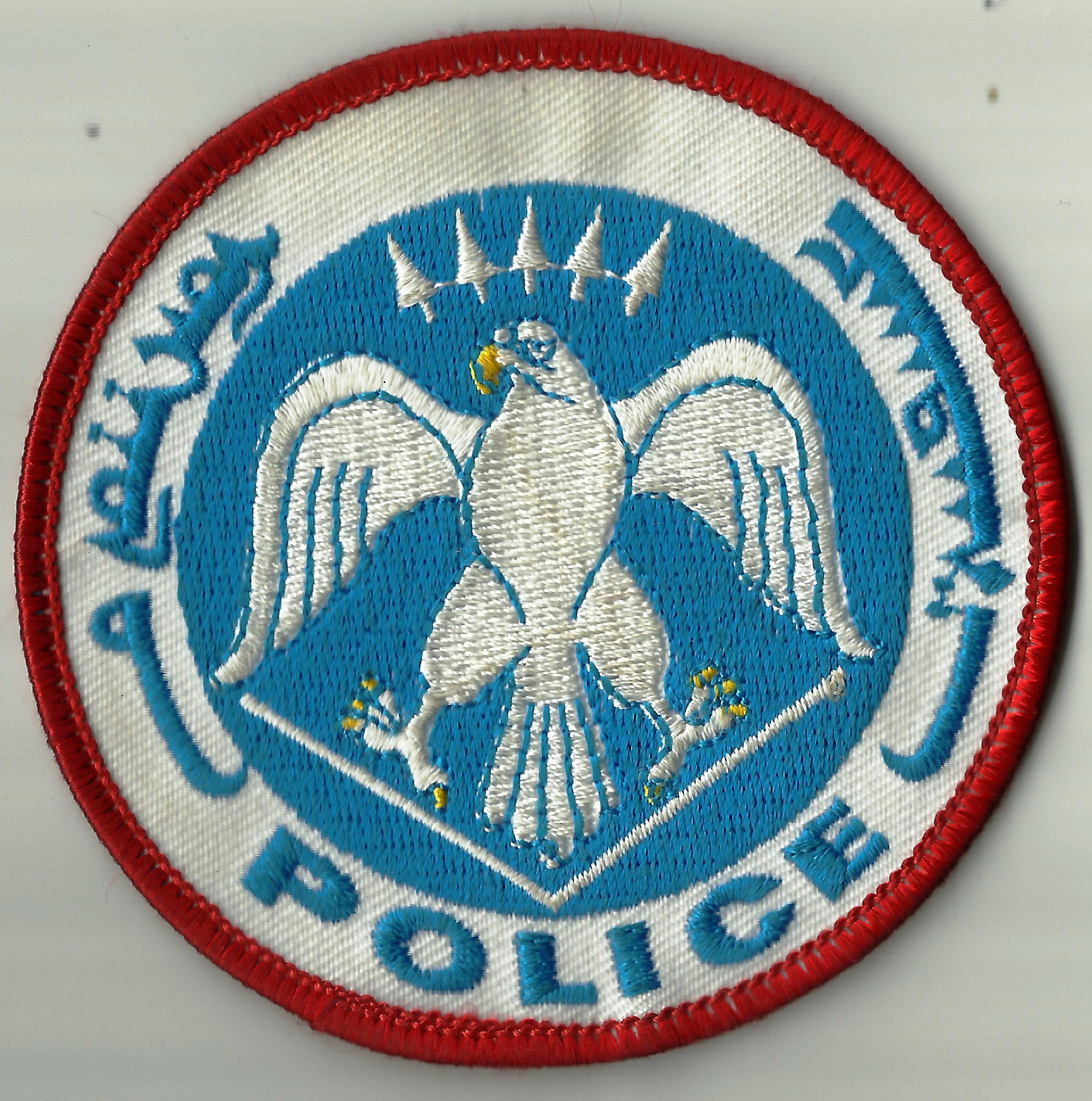
Two examples of the two kinds of letter separation: with the suffix ‑un ( ᠤᠨ)^{⟨?⟩} and the final vowel ‑a ( ᠠ)^{⟨?⟩}

The presence or lack of a separated a or e can also indicate differences in meaning between different words (compare ᠬᠠᠷ᠎ᠠ^{⟨?⟩} qar‑a 'black' with ᠬᠠᠷᠠ qara 'to look').

It has the same shape as the traditional dative-locative suffix ‑a/‑e exemplified in the next section. This form of the suffix is, however, more commonly found in older texts, and is restricted in its Post-Classical use.

=== Separated suffixes ===
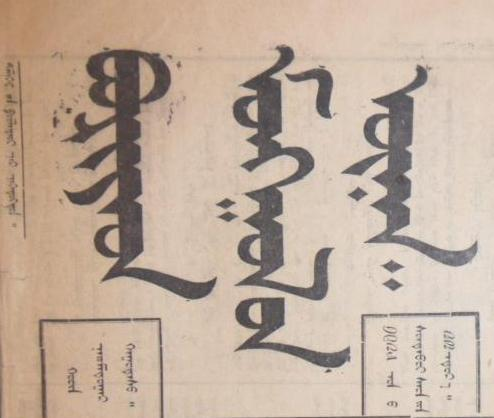
1925 logo of Buryat–Mongolian newspaper (with the suffix ᠤᠨ^{⟨?⟩} ‑un): ᠪᠤᠷᠢᠶᠠᠳ ᠮᠣᠩᠭᠣᠯ ᠤᠨ ᠦᠨᠡᠨ᠃; Buriyad Mongɣol‑un ünen; 'Buryat-Mongol truth'

All case suffixes, as well as any plural suffixes consisting of one or two syllables, are likewise separated by a preceding and hyphen-transliterated gap. (Note: In digital typesetting, this shaping is achieved by inserting a U+202F NARROW NO-BREAK SPACE (NNBSP) between the separated letters.) A maximum of two case suffixes can be added to a stem.

Such single-letter vowel suffixes appear with the final-shaped forms of a/e, i, or u/ü, as in ᠭᠠᠵᠠᠷ ᠠ^{⟨?⟩} ɣaǰar‑a 'to the country' and ᠡᠳᠦᠷ ᠡ^{⟨?⟩} edür‑e 'on the day', or ᠤᠯᠤᠰ ᠢ^{⟨?⟩} ulus‑i 'the state' etc. Multi-letter suffixes most often start with an initial- (consonants), medial- (vowels), or variant-shaped form. Medial-shaped u in the two-letter suffix ᠤᠨ^{⟨?⟩} ‑un/‑ün is exemplified in the adjacent newspaper logo.

=== Consonant clusters ===
Two medial consonants are the most that can come together in original Mongolian words. There are however, a few loanwords that can begin or end with two or more. (Note: Examples of such include: (dotless š) gšan 'moment', gkir 'dirt', or bodisdv 'Bodhisattva' ( ).)

=== Compound names ===
In the modern language, proper names can usually join two words into graphic compounds (such as those of ᠬᠠᠰᠡᠷᠳᠡᠨᠢ Qas'erdeni 'Jasper-jewel' or ᠬᠥᠬᠡᠬᠣᠲᠠ Kökeqota – the city of Hohhot; as opposed to other compound words). This also allows components of different harmonic classes to be joined together, and vowels of an added suffix will harmonize with those of the latter part of the compound. Orthographic peculiarities are most often retained, as with the short and long teeth of an initial-shaped ⟨ᠥ‍→᠊ᠥ᠌‍⟩ ö in ᠮᠤᠤ‍‍ᠥ̅᠌‍‍ᠬᠢᠨ Muu'ökin 'Bad Girl' (protective name). Medial t and d, in contrast, are not affected in this way.

=== Isolate citation forms ===
Isolate citation forms for syllables containing o, u, ö, and ü may in dictionaries appear without a final tail as in ⟨ᠪᠣ⟩ bo/bu or ⟨ᠮᠣ᠋⟩ mo/mu, and with a vertical tail as in ⟨ᠪᠥ᠋⟩ bö/bü or ⟨ᠮᠥ᠋⟩ mö/mü (as well as in transcriptions of Chinese syllables).

== Flaws ==
In the traditional Mongolian script, certain letters—such as t and d, o and u—were frequently confused, and letter formation varied inconsistently at the beginning, middle, and end of words. The poor legibility between letters and the requirement to memorize each syllable's shape individually increased the learning burden of the script. Additionally, its structural characteristics led to wider line spacing, consuming more space and paper. For example, in Qing Dynasty texts like the Pentaglot Dictionary, the Manchu and Mongolian sections occupy a larger portion of the page.

== Letters ==
=== Sort orders ===
Only in a late form can a definite order of signs be established for the alphabet, but can likely be traced back to an earlier Uyghur model.

Example orders (Note: Transliterations have been normalized according to this article's letter tables. Loan consonants are shown in parentheses.)
South (inner) Mongolian order	a	e	i	o	u	ö	ü	n	b	p	q	k	ɣ	g	m	l	s	š	t	d	č	ǰ	y	r	v	(f)	(ž)	(c)	(k)	(h)
1986 primer, Mongolian Republic	a	e	i	o	u	ö	ü	n	b	q	k	ɣ	g	ǰ	y	t	d	m	č	r	s	š	l	v	(p)	(f)	(z)	(c)	(k)	(h)
Dictionaries after 1924, Mongolian Republic	a	e	i	o	u	ö	ü	n	b	q	k	ɣ	g	ǰ	y	t	d	m	č	r	s	š	l	v	(f)	(p)	(ž)	(c)	(k)	(h)

=== Native Mongolian ===
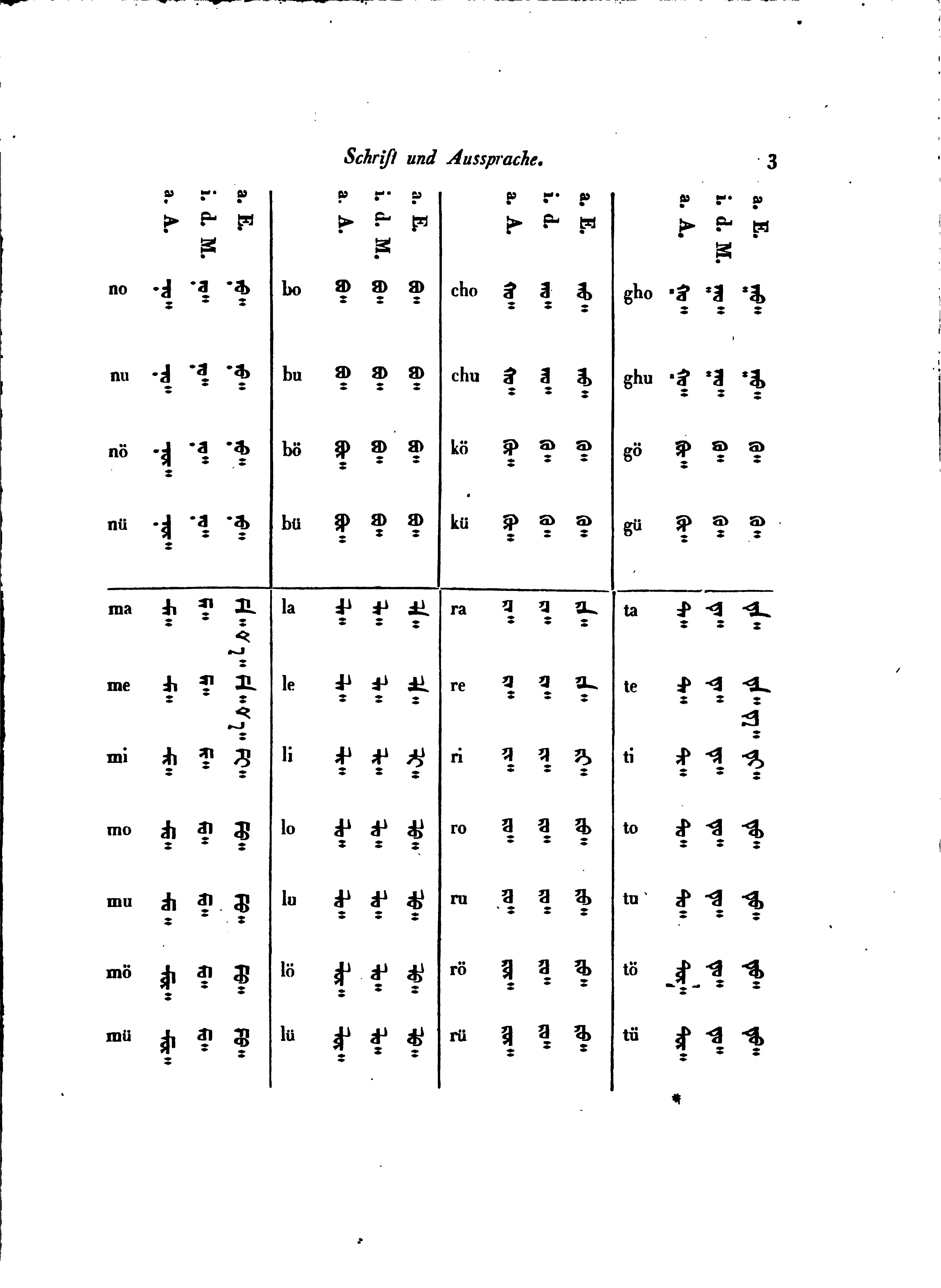
The script represented as a syllabary, 19th century

Native Mongolian
Letters	Contextual forms			Transliteration (Note: Scholarly/Scientific transliteration.)			International Phonetic Alphabet	
Letters	Initial	Medial	Final	Latin	Mongolian Pinyin	Mong. Cyrillic	Khalkha	Chakhar
ᠠ	ᠠ‍	‍ᠠ‍	‍ᠠ ‍ᠠ᠋	a	a	а	/a/	/ɑ/
ᠡ	ᠡ‍	‍ᠡ‍	‍ᠡ ‍ᠡ᠋	e	e	э	/ə/	
ᠢ	ᠢ‍	‍ᠢ‍	‍ᠢ	i	i	и	/i/	/i/ or /ɪ/
ᠣ	ᠣ‍	‍ᠣ‍	‍ᠣ	o	ô	о	/ɔ/	
ᠤ	ᠤ‍	‍ᠤ‍	‍ᠤ	u	û	у	/ʊ/	
ᠥ	ᠥ‍	‍ᠥ᠋‍ ‍ᠥ‍	‍ᠥ	ö	o	ө	/ɵ/	/o/
ᠦ	ᠦ‍	‍ᠦ᠋‍ ‍ᠦ‍	‍ᠦ	ü	u	ү	/u/	
ᠨ	ᠨ‍	‍ᠨ‍ ‍ᠨ᠋‍	‍ᠨ ‍ᠨ᠋	n	n	н	/n/	
ᠩ	—	‍ᠩ‍	‍ᠩ	ng	ng	нг	/ŋ/	
ᠪ	ᠪ‍	‍ᠪ‍	‍ᠪ	b	b	б	/p/ and /w/	/b/
ᠫ	ᠫ‍	‍ᠫ‍	‍ᠫ	p	p	п	/pʰ/	/p/
ᠬ	ᠬ	‍ᠬ‍	‍ᠬ	q k	h	х	/x/	
ᠭ	ᠭ	‍ᠭ‍ ‍ᠭ᠋‍	‍ᠭ ‍ᠭ᠍	ɣ g	g	г	/ɢ/	/ɣ/
ᠮ	ᠮ‍	‍ᠮ‍	‍ᠮ	m	m	м	/m/	
ᠯ	ᠯ‍	‍ᠯ‍	‍ᠯ	l	l	л	/ɮ/	/l/
ᠰ	ᠰ‍	‍ᠰ‍	‍ᠰ	s	s	с	/s/ or /ʃ/ before i	
ᠱ	ᠱ‍	‍ᠱ‍	‍ᠱ	š	x	ш	/ʃ/	
ᠲ	ᠲ‍	‍ᠲ‍	—	t	t	т	/t/	
ᠳ	ᠳ‍	‍ᠳ‍ ‍ᠳ᠋‍	‍ᠳ	d	d	д	/t/ and /tʰ/	/d/
ᠴ	ᠴ‍	‍ᠴ‍	—	č	q	ч	/t͡ʃʰ/ and /t͡sʰ/	/t͡ʃ/
ᠵ	ᠵ‍	‍ᠵ‍	—	ǰ	j	ж	/d͡ʒ/ and d͡z	/d͡ʒ/
ᠶ	ᠶ‍	‍ᠶ‍	‍ᠶ	y	y	й	/j/	
ᠷ	ᠷ‍	‍ᠷ‍	‍ᠷ	r	r	р	/r/	

=== Galik characters ===
In 1587, the translator and scholar Ayuush Güüsh created the Galik alphabet (Али-гали Ali-gali), inspired by the third Dalai Lama, Sonam Gyatso. It primarily added extra characters for transcribing Tibetan and Sanskrit terms when translating religious texts, and later also from Chinese. Some of those characters are still in use today for writing foreign names (as listed below).

In 1917, the politician and linguist Bayantömöriin Khaisan published the rime dictionary Mongolian-Han Bilingual Original Sounds of the Five Regions, (Note: simplified Chinese: 《蒙汉合璧五方元音》; traditional Chinese: 《蒙漢合璧五方元音》) a bilingual edition of the earlier Original Sounds of the Five Regions, (Note: Chinese: 《五方元音》) to aid Mongolian speakers in learning Mandarin Chinese. To that end, he included transliterations of Mandarin using the Mongolian script, and repurposed three Galik letters to represent the Mandarin retroflex consonants. These letters remain in use in Inner Mongolia for the purpose of transcribing Chinese. Galik characters are also used for transcription of loanwords.

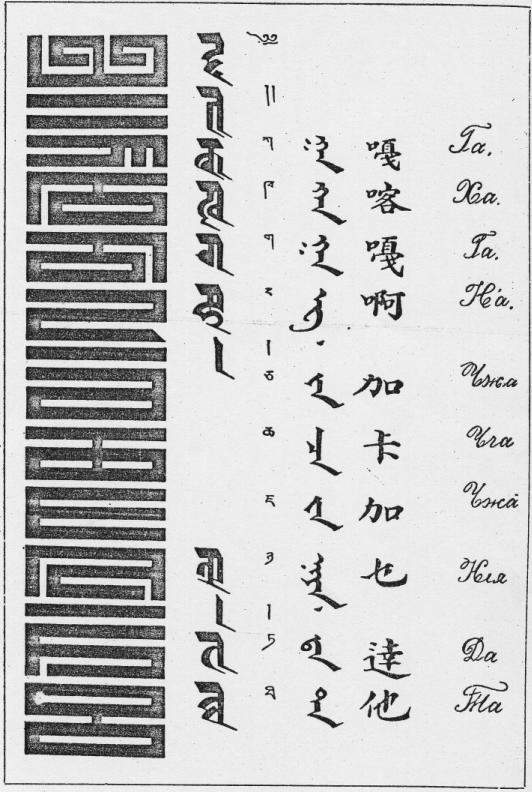
From left to right: Phagspa, Lantsa, Tibetan, Mongolian, Chinese and Cyrillic, from 1903 or earlier

Galik characters
Letters	Contextual forms			Transliteration				IPA
Letters	Initial	Medial	Final	Latin	Mong. Cyrillic	Sanskrit	Tibetan	IPA
ᠧ	ᠧ‍	‍ᠧ‍	‍ᠧ	e	е	ए	ཨེ	/e/
ᠸ	ᠸ‍	‍ᠸ‍	‍ᠸ	w/v	в	व	ཝ	/w/
ᠹ	ᠹ‍	‍ᠹ‍	‍ᠹ	f	ф	फ	ཕ	/f/
ᠺ	ᠺ‍	‍ᠺ‍	‍ᠺ	g/k	к	ग	ག	/k/
ᠻ	ᠻ‍	‍ᠻ‍	‍ᠻ	k/kh	к	ख	ཁ	/kʰ/
ᠲ	ᠲ‍	ᠲ‍	‍ᠲ	t	т	त	ཏ	/t/
ᠼ	ᠼ‍	‍ᠼ‍	‍ᠼ	c	ц	छ	ཚ	/t͡s/
ᠽ	ᠽ‍	‍ᠽ‍	‍ᠽ	z	з	च	ཙ ཛ	/d͡z/
ᠾ	ᠾ‍	‍ᠾ‍	‍ᠾ	h	х	ह	ཧ	/h/
ᠿ (Note: Used in Inner Mongolia, and always followed by i. Only used to transcribe the Mandarin Chinese retroflex r, as in 日; rì: ᠿᠢ.)	ᠿ‍	—	—	ž	ж		ཞ	/ʐ/, /ɻ/ (Note: Lee & Zee (2003) and Lin (2007) transcribe these as approximants, while Duanmu (2007) transcribes these as voiced fricatives. The actual pronunciation has been acoustically measured to be more approximant-like.)
ᡀ (Note: Only used in Tibetan loanwords to represent ལྷ syllables, as in ᡀᠠᠰᠠ Lhasa or ᠳᠠᡀᠠ dalha 'enemy gods'. Treated as a separate letter due to representing an independent phoneme, but can be analysed as a digraph of ᠯ‍ (l) and ‍ᠾ‍ (h) (noting the latter is in medial position).)	ᡀ‍	‍ᡀ‍	—	lh	лх		ལྷ	/ɬ/
ᡁ (Note: Used in Inner Mongolia, and always followed by i. Only used to transcribe the Mandarin Chinese retroflex zh, as in 之; zhī: ᡁᠢ. Takes the form of medial h, but used in initial position.)	ᡁ‍	—	—	zh	з			/d͡ʐ/
ᡂ (Note: Used in Inner Mongolia, and always followed by i. Only used to transcribe the Mandarin Chinese retroflex ch, as in 蚩; chī: ᡂᠢ.)	ᡂ‍	—	—	ch	ч		ཋ	/t͡ʂ/

== Punctuation and numerals ==
=== Punctuation ===
Example of word-breaking the name Oyirad 'Oirat', 1604 manuscript

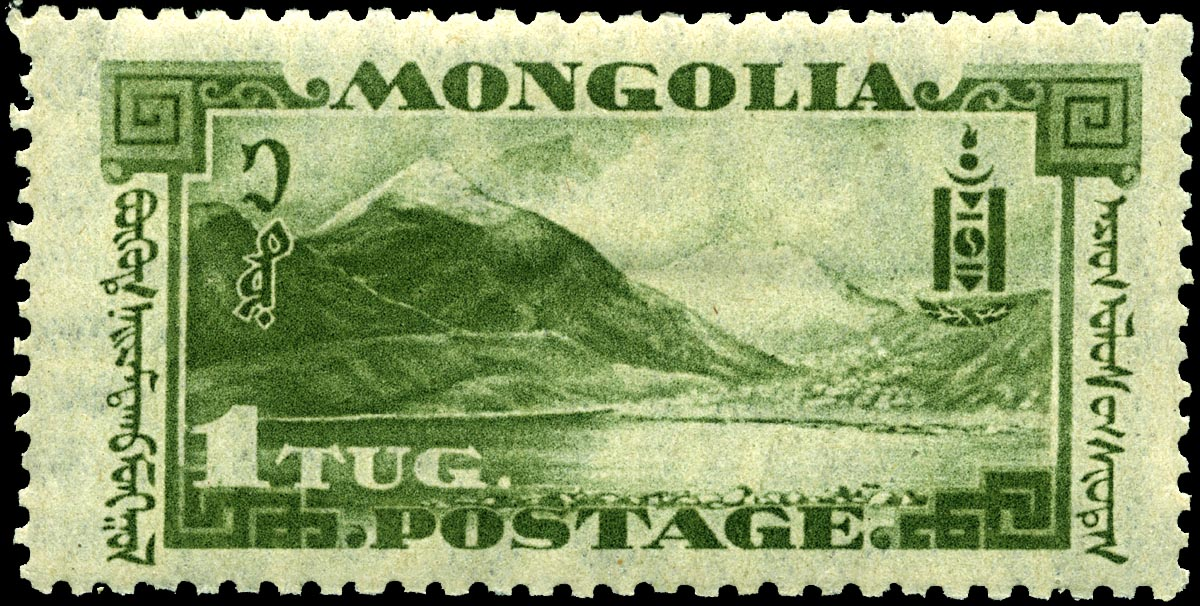
Abbreviation exemplified with the initial syllable of the Mongolian tögrög (ᠲᠥ‍᠂)

When written between words, punctuation marks use space on both sides of them. They can also appear at the very end of a line, regardless of where the preceding word ends. Red (cinnabar) ink is used in many manuscripts, to either symbolize emphasis or respect. Modern punctuation incorporates Western marks: parentheses; quotation, question, and exclamation marks; including precomposed ⁈ and ⁉.

Punctuation
Form(s)	Name	Function(s)
᠀	Birga (Note: ᠪᠢᠷᠭ᠎ᠠ^{⟨?⟩} birɣ‑a (Khalkha: бярга byarga))	Marks start of a book, chapter, passage, or first line
᠀᠋	Birga	Marks start of a book, chapter, passage, or first line
᠀᠌	Birga	Marks start of a book, chapter, passage, or first line
᠀᠍	Birga	Marks start of a book, chapter, passage, or first line
[...]	Birga	Marks start of a book, chapter, passage, or first line
᠂	'Dot' (Note: ᠴᠡᠭ čeg (Khalkha: цэг tseg))	Comma
᠃	'Double-dot' (Note: ᠳᠠᠪᠬᠤᠷ ᠴᠡᠭ dabqur čeg (Khalkha: давхар цэг davkhar tseg))	Period / full stop
᠅	'Four-fold dot' (Note: ᠳᠥᠷᠪᠡᠯᠵᠢᠨ ᠴᠡᠭ dörbelǰin čeg (Khalkha: дөрвөлжин цэг dörvöljin tseg))	Marks end of a passage, paragraph, or chapter
᠁	'Dotted line' (Note: ᠴᠤᠪᠠᠭ᠎ᠠ/ᠴᠤᠪᠤᠭ᠎ᠠ^{⟨?⟩} ᠴᠡᠭ čubaɣ‑a/čubuɣ‑a čeg (Khalkha: цуваа цэг tsuvaa tseg))	Ellipsis
᠄	'Parallel dots' (Note: ᠵᠡᠷᠭᠡᠴᠡᠭᠡ ᠴᠡᠭ ǰergečege čeg (Khalkha: зэрэгцээ цэг zeregtsee tseg)) 'Pair of dots' (Note: ᠬᠣᠣᠰ ᠴᠡᠭ qoos čeg (Khalkha: хос цэг khos tseg))	Colon
᠆	'Spine, backbone' (Note: ᠨᠢᠷᠤᠭᠤ niruɣu (Khalkha: нуруу nuruu))	Mongolian soft hyphen (wikt:᠆)
᠊	'Spine, backbone'	Mongolian non-breaking hyphen, or stem extender (wikt:᠊)

=== Numerals ===
	Text	Image
15 on 'year of 15' on a 1925 tögrög coin, with the number written across the baseline.	᠑᠕ ᠣᠨ	
89 (top) written vertically on a hillside, with the number written along the baseline.	᠘ ᠙	
Printed numeral 3, written along the baseline and rotated 90 degrees clockwise.	᠁‍ᠤᠢ ᠓ ᠬᠡ‍᠁	

0	1	2	3	4	5	6	7	8	9
᠐	᠑	᠒	᠓	᠔	᠕	᠖	᠗	᠘	᠙

Mongolian numerals are either written from left to right, or from top to bottom. For typographical reasons, they are rotated 90° in modern books to fit on the line.

== Components and writing styles ==
=== Components ===
Listed in the table below are letter components (graphemes) (Note: Mongolian: ᠵᠢᠷᠤᠯᠭ᠎ᠠ^{⟨?⟩} ǰirulɣ‑a / Khalkha: зурлага zurlaga) commonly used across the script. Some of these are used with several letters, and others to contrast between them. As their forms and usage may differ between writing styles, however, examples of these can be found under this section below.

Common components (Note: Lessing, Ferdinand (1960). Mongolian-English Dictionary (PDF). University of California Press. Note that this dictionary uses the transliterations c, ø, x, y, z, ai, and ei; instead of č, ö, q, ü, ǰ, ayi, and eyi; as well as problematically and incorrectly treats all rounded vowels (o/u/ö/ü) after the initial syllable as u or ü.)
Form	Name(s)	Use
᠊ᠡ‍	'Tooth' (Note: ᠠᠴᠤᠭ ačuɣ (Khalkha: ацаг atsag) or ᠰᠢᠳᠦ sidü (Khalkha: шүд shüd))	A main part of letters a/e (from Old Uyghur aleph), n (nun, also part of the digraph ng), q/ɣ (gimel-heth), m (mem), l (hooked resh), initial t/d (taw), etc. Historically also part of k/g (kaph), as well as r (resh).
ᠡ‍	'Crown' (Note: ᠲᠢᠲᠢᠮ titim (Khalkha: тит(и/э)м tit(i/e)m))	An exaggerated initial (swash) tooth. Used for the leading aleph of initial vowels (a, e, i, o, u, ö, ü, ē), and with some initial consonants (n, m, l, h = nun, mem, hooked resh, ha etc.). Historically unused.
᠊᠊	'Spine, backbone' (Note: ᠨᠢᠷᠤᠭᠤ niruɣu (Khalkha: нуруу nuruu))	The vertical line running through words.
‍᠊ᠠ	'Tail' (Note: ᠰᠡᠭᠦᠯ segül (Khalkha: сүүл süül))	The swash final of a/e, n, d, etc.
‍᠊ᠰ᠋	'Short tail' (Note: ᠪᠣᠭᠤᠨᠢ ᠰᠡᠭᠦᠯ boɣuni segül (Khalkha: богино/богонь сүүл bogino/bogoni süül))	The swash final of q/ɣ, m, and s (samekh-shin or zayin).
᠎ᠠ^{⟨?⟩} ⟨⟩	Crook (Note: ᠣᠷᠬᠢᠴᠠ orkiča (Khalkha: орхиц orkhits))	The separated final a/e.
᠎ᠠ^{⟨?⟩} ⟨⟩	Crook, 'Sprinkling, dusting' (Note: ᠴᠠᠴᠤᠯᠭ᠎ᠠ^{⟨?⟩} čačulɣ‑a (Khalkha: цацлага tsatslaga))	The connected lower part of final a/e; the lower part of final g (kaph).
‍ᡳ᠌	'Hook' (Note: ᠳᠡᠭᠡᠭᠡ degege (Khalkha: дэгээ degee))	The final part of final i (after bow-shaped b, k/g) and some galik letters.
ᠵ‍	'Shin, stick' (Note: ᠰᠢᠯᠪᠢ silbi (Khalkha: шилбэ shilbe))	A main part of i, ǰ, and y, and final part of initial ö/ü (yodh). Also the upper part of final g (kaph).
ᠵ‍	'Straight shin' (Note: ᠰᠢᠯᠤᠭᠤᠨ ᠰᠢᠯᠪᠢ siluɣun silbi (Khalkha: шулуун шилбэ shuluun shilbe))	A main part of i, ǰ, and y, and final part of initial ö/ü (yodh). Also the upper part of final g (kaph).
ᠵ‍	'Long tooth' (Note: ᠤᠷᠲᠤ ᠰᠢᠳᠦ urtu sidü (Khalkha: урт шүд urt shüd))	A main part of i, ǰ, and y, and final part of initial ö/ü (yodh). Also the upper part of final g (kaph).
ᠶ‍	'Shin with upturn' (Note: ᠡᠭᠡᠲᠡᠭᠡᠷ ᠰᠢᠯᠪᠢ egeteger silbi (Khalkha: э(э)тгэр шилбэ e(e)tger shilbe))	Initial and medial y (yodh).
ᠸ‍	Shin with downturn (Note: ᠮᠠᠲᠠᠭᠠᠷ ᠰᠢᠯᠪᠢ mataɣar silbi (Khalkha: матгар шилбэ matgar shilbe))	The letters ē and w (bet).
ᠷ‍	Horned shin (Note: ᠥᠷᠭᠡᠰᠦᠲᠡᠢ ᠰᠢᠯᠪᠢ örgesütei silbi (Khalkha: өргөстэй шилбэ örgöstei shilbe))	The letter r (resh). Historically also the upper part of final g and separated a/e.
ᠳ᠋‍	'Looped shin' (Note: ᠭᠣᠭᠴᠤᠭᠠᠲᠠᠢ ᠰᠢᠯᠪᠢ ɣoɣčuɣatai silbi (Khalkha: гогцоотой шилбэ gogtsootoi shilbe))	A medial t/d (lamedh). Historically with its enclosed (counter) endpoint varying in shape: as open/closed, hook-shaped, pointy/round etc.
ᡁ‍	'Hollow shin' (Note: ᠬᠥᠨᠳᠡᠢ ᠰᠢᠯᠪᠢ köndei silbi (Khalkha: хөндий шилбэ khöndii shilbe))	The letters h and zh (from the Tibetan script).
‍ᠢ	'Bow' (Note: ᠨᠤᠮᠤ numu (Khalkha: нум num))	Final i, o/u/ö/ü, and r; ng, b/p (pe), k/g, etc.
‍᠊ᠣ‍	'Belly, stomach,' loop, contour (Note: ᠭᠡᠳᠡᠰᠦ gedesü (Khalkha: гэдэс gedes))	The counter of o/u/ö/ü (waw), b, p, initial t/d, etc.
ᠲ‍	'Hind-gut' (Note: ᠠᠷᠤ ᠶᠢᠨ ᠭᠡᠳᠡᠰᠦ^{⟨?⟩} aru‑yin gedesü (Khalkha: арын гэдэс aryn gedes))	An initial t/d (taw).
ᠬ	[...] (Note: [...] (Khalkha: ятгар зартиг yatgar zartig))	An initial q/ɣ (gimel-heth).
‍᠊ᠮ‍	'Braid, pigtail' (Note: ᠭᠡᠵᠢᠭᠡ geǰige (Khalkha: гэзэг gezeg)) and 'Horn' (Note: ᠡᠪᠡᠷ eber (Khalkha: эвэр ever))	The letters m (mem) and l (hooked resh).
‍᠊ᠯ‍	'Braid, pigtail' and 'Horn'	The letters m (mem) and l (hooked resh).
‍᠊ᠰ‍	'Corner of the mouth' (Note: ᠵᠠᠪᠠᠵᠢ ǰabaǰi (Khalkha: зав(и/ь)ж zavij))	The letters s/š (samekh-shin).
‍ᠴ‍	'Fork prong' (Note: ᠰᠡᠷᠡᠭᠡ ᠡᠪᠡᠷ serege eber (Khalkha: сэрээ эвэр seree ever))	The letter č (angular tsade).
‍ᠴ‍	'Fork' (Note: ᠠᠴᠠ ača (Khalkha: ац ats))	The letter č (angular tsade).
‍ᠵ‍	[...] (Note: [...] (Khalkha: жалжгар эвэр jaljgar ever))	The letter ǰ (smooth tsade).
‍ᠵ‍	'Tusk, fang' (Note: ᠰᠣᠶᠤᠭ᠎ᠠ^{⟨?⟩} soyuɣ‑a (Khalkha: соёо soyoo))	The letter ǰ (smooth tsade).
‍᠊ᠹ‍	Flaglet, tuft (Note: ᠵᠠᠷᠲᠢᠭ ǰartiɣ (Khalkha: зартиг zartig Wylie: 'jar-thig))	The left-side diacritic of f, z, etc. These names are only used for such components created for words of foreign origin.
‍ᠽ‍	Flaglet, tuft	The left-side diacritic of f, z, etc. These names are only used for such components created for words of foreign origin.

=== Writing styles ===
As exemplified in this section, the shapes of glyphs may vary widely between different styles of writing and choice of medium with which to produce them. The development of written Mongolian can be divided into the three periods of pre-classical (beginning – 17th century), classical (16/17th century – 20th century), and modern (20th century onward):

Image	Text
	ᠤᠷᠢᠳᠤ ᠮᠠᠬᠠᠮ ᠤᠨ ᠬᠠᠵᠢᠤᠨ ᠮᠡᠳᠡᠬᠦ
Cursive sample in (pre-classical) Middle Mongol: Uridu maqam‑un qaǰiun medekü

==== Rounded letterforms ====
- Rounded letterforms tend to be more prevalent with handwritten styles (compare printed and handwritten arban 'ten').

Block‑printed		1604 Pen-written form (Note: "Little" Altan Tobchi 'Golden Summary')	Modern brush‑written form	Transliteration(s) & 'translation'
1312 Uyghur Mong. form (Note: Bodhicaryāvatāra 'The Journey to Enlightenment' commentary)	semi-modern forms (Note: Suvarṇaprabhāsa-sūtra or altan gerel kemekü yeke kölgen sudur orošibai 'The Mahāyāna sūtra called the Golden Ray')	1604 Pen-written form	Modern brush‑written form	Transliteration(s) & 'translation'
				arban 'ten'

==== Tail ====
- Final letterforms with a right-pointing tail (such as those of a, e, n, q, ɣ, m, l, s, š, and d) may have the notch preceding it in printed form, written in a span between two extremes: from as a more or less tapered point, to a fully rounded curve in handwriting.
- The long final tails of a, e, n, and d in the texts of pre-classical Mongolian can become elongated vertically to fill up the remainder of a line. Such tails are used consistently for these letters in the earliest 13th to 15th century Uyghur Mongolian style of texts.
Examples of lengthened letterforms d and n in ‑daɣan (left), and their regular equivalents (right)

Block‑printed		Pen-written forms	Modern brush‑written forms	Transliteration(s) & 'translation'
Uyghur Mong. forms	semi-modern forms	Pen-written forms	Modern brush‑written forms	Transliteration(s) & 'translation'
				‑ača/‑eče
				‑un/‑ün
				‑ud/‑üd
				ba 'and'

==== Yodh ====
- A hooked form of yodh was borrowed from the Manchu alphabet in the 19th century to distinguish initial y from ǰ. The handwritten form of final-shaped yodh (i, ǰ, y), can be greatly shortened in comparison with its initial and medial forms.

Block‑printed		Pen-written forms	Modern brush‑written forms	Transliteration(s) & 'translation'
Uyghur Mong. forms	semi-modern forms	Pen-written forms	Modern brush‑written forms	Transliteration(s) & 'translation'
				‑i
				‑yi
				‑yin
				sain/sayin 'good'
				yeke 'great'

==== Diacritics ====
- The definite status or function of diacritics was not established prior to classical Mongolian. As such, the dotted letters n, ɣ, and š, can be found sporadically dotted or altogether lacking them. Additionally, both q and ɣ could be (double-)dotted to identify them regardless of their sound values. Final dotted n is also found in modern Mongolian words. Any diacritical dots of ɣ and n can be offset downward from their respective letters (as in ᠭᠣᠣᠯ ɣool and ᠭᠦᠨ ᠢ^{⟨?⟩} gün‑i).

==== Bow ====
- When a bow-shaped consonant is followed by a vowel in Uyghur style text, said bow can be found to notably overlap it (see bi). A final b has, in its final pre-modern form, a bow-less final form as opposed to the common modern one:

Block‑printed		Pen-written forms	Modern brush‑written forms	Transliteration(s) & 'translation'
Uyghur Mong. forms	semi-modern forms	Pen-written forms	Modern brush‑written forms	Transliteration(s) & 'translation'
				‑u/‑ü
				bi 'I'
				ab (intensifying particle)

==== Gimel-heth and kaph ====
- As in kü, köke, ǰüg and separated a/e, two teeth can also make up the top-left part of a kaph (k/g) or aleph (a/e) in pre-classical texts. In back-vocalic words of Uyghur Mongolian, qi was used in place of ki, and can therefore be used to identify this stage of the written language. An example of this appears in the suffix ‑taqi/‑daqi.

Block‑printed		Pen-written forms	Modern brush‑written forms	Transliteration(s) & 'translation'
Uyghur Mong. forms	semi-modern forms	Pen-written forms	Modern brush‑written forms	Transliteration(s) & 'translation'
				‑a/‑e
				‑luɣ‑a
			[...]	kü (emphatic particle)
				köke 'blue'
köge 'soot'
				ǰüg 'direction'

==== Ligatures ====
- In pre-modern Mongolian, medial ml (‍ᠮᠯ‍) forms a ligature:.

The word čiɣšabd 'monastic vow' in a Uyghur Mongolian style: exemplifying a dotted syllable-final ɣ, and a final bd ligature. (Note: Also čaɣšbd or čaɣšabad.)

==== Short tail ====
- A pre-modern variant form for final s appears in the shape of a short final n ⟨‍ᠰ᠋⟩, derived from Old Uyghur zayin (𐽴). It tended to be replaced by the mouth-shaped form and is no longer used. An early example of it is found in the name of Gengis Khan on the Stele of Yisüngge: ᠴᠢᠩᠭᠢᠰ᠋ Činggis. A zayin-shaped final can also appear as part of final m and ɣ.

Block‑printed		Pen-written forms	Transliteration(s) & 'translation'
Uyghur Mong. forms	semi-modern forms	Pen-written forms	Transliteration(s) & 'translation'
			es(‑)e 'not, no', (negation)
			ulus 'nation'
			nom 'book'
			čaɣ 'time'

==== Taw and lamedh ====
- Initial taw (t/d) can, akin to final mem (m), be found written quite explicitly loopy (as in nom 'book' and toli 'mirror'). The lamedh (t or d) may appear simply as an oval loop or looped shin, or as more angular, with an either closed or open counter (as in ‑daki/‑deki or ‑dur/‑dür). As in metü, a Uyghur style word-medial t can sometimes be written with the pre-consonantal form otherwise used for d. Taw was applied to both initial t and d from the outset of the script's adoption. This was done in imitation of Old Uyghur which, however, had lacked the phoneme d in this position.

Block‑printed		Pen-written forms	Modern brush‑written forms	Transliteration(s) & 'translation'
Uyghur Mong. forms	semi-modern forms	Pen-written forms	Modern brush‑written forms	Transliteration(s) & 'translation'
		[...]		toli 'mirror'
			[...]	‑daki/‑deki
			[...]	‑tur/‑tür
				‑dur/‑dür
			[...]	metü 'as'

==== Tsade ====
- Following the late classical Mongolian orthography of the 17th and 18th centuries, a smooth and angular tsade (‍ᠵ‍ and ᠴ) has come to represent ǰ and č respectively. The tsade before this was used for both these phonemes, regardless of graphical variants, as no ǰ had existed in Old Uyghur:

Block‑printed		Transliteration(s) & 'translation'
Uyghur Mong. form	semi-modern form	Transliteration(s) & 'translation'
		čečeg 'flower'

Block-printed semi-modern form	Pen-written form	Transliteration(s) & 'translation'
		qačar/ɣaǰar 'cheek/place'

==== Resh ====
- As in sara and ‑dur/‑dür, a resh (of r, and sometimes of l) can appear as two teeth or crossed shins; adjacent, angled, attached to a shin and/or overlapping.

Block‑printed		Pen-written form	Modern brush‑written form	Transliteration(s) & 'translation'
Uyghur Mong. form	semi-modern forms	Pen-written form	Modern brush‑written form	Transliteration(s) & 'translation'
				sar(‑)a 'moon/month'

== Example ==
Wikipedia slogan
Manuscript	Type	Unicode	Transliteration (first word)
		ᠸᠢᠺᠢᠫᠧᠳᠢᠶᠠ᠂ ᠴᠢᠯᠦᠭᠡᠲᠦ ᠨᠡᠪᠲᠡᠷᠬᠡᠢ ᠲᠣᠯᠢ ᠪᠢᠴᠢᠭ ᠪᠣᠯᠠᠢ᠃	ᠸᠢ‍ wi/vi
		ᠸᠢᠺᠢᠫᠧᠳᠢᠶᠠ᠂ ᠴᠢᠯᠦᠭᠡᠲᠦ ᠨᠡᠪᠲᠡᠷᠬᠡᠢ ᠲᠣᠯᠢ ᠪᠢᠴᠢᠭ ᠪᠣᠯᠠᠢ᠃	‍ᠺᠢ‍ gi/ki
		ᠸᠢᠺᠢᠫᠧᠳᠢᠶᠠ᠂ ᠴᠢᠯᠦᠭᠡᠲᠦ ᠨᠡᠪᠲᠡᠷᠬᠡᠢ ᠲᠣᠯᠢ ᠪᠢᠴᠢᠭ ᠪᠣᠯᠠᠢ᠃	‍ᠫᠧ‍ pē/pé
		ᠸᠢᠺᠢᠫᠧᠳᠢᠶᠠ᠂ ᠴᠢᠯᠦᠭᠡᠲᠦ ᠨᠡᠪᠲᠡᠷᠬᠡᠢ ᠲᠣᠯᠢ ᠪᠢᠴᠢᠭ ᠪᠣᠯᠠᠢ᠃	‍ᠳᠢ‍ di
		ᠸᠢᠺᠢᠫᠧᠳᠢᠶᠠ᠂ ᠴᠢᠯᠦᠭᠡᠲᠦ ᠨᠡᠪᠲᠡᠷᠬᠡᠢ ᠲᠣᠯᠢ ᠪᠢᠴᠢᠭ ᠪᠣᠯᠠᠢ᠃	‍ᠶ᠎ᠠ^{⟨?⟩} y‑a or ‍ᠶᠠ ya
Transliteration: Wikipēdiya čilügetü nebterkei toli bičig bolai.; Cyrillic: Википедиа чөлөөт нэвтэрхий толь бичиг болой.; Transcription: Vikipedia chölööt nevterkhii toli bichig boloi.; Translation: Wikipedia is the free encyclopedia.

== Gallery ==
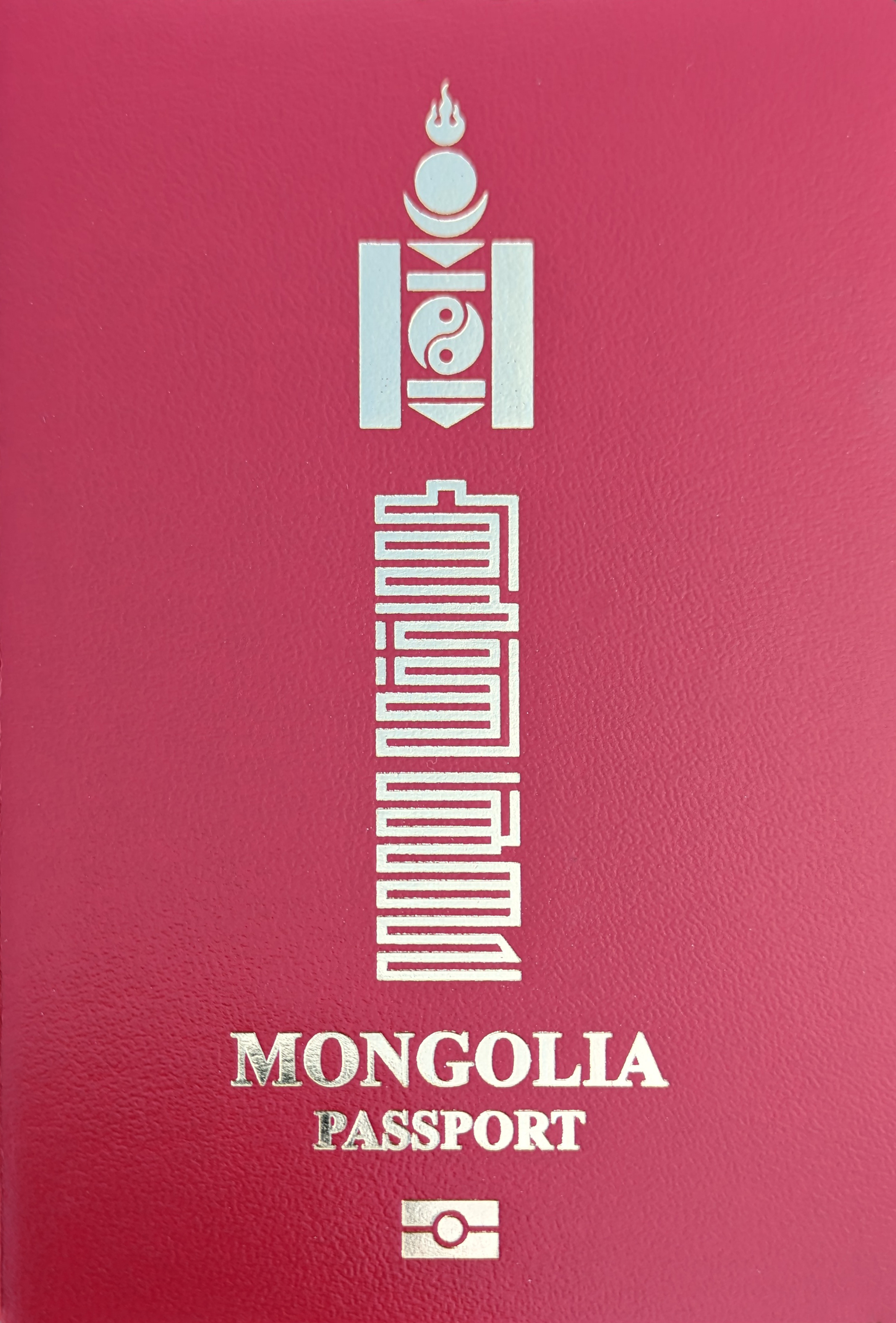
Decorative 'wrapped/folded' letters on a 2023 passport.

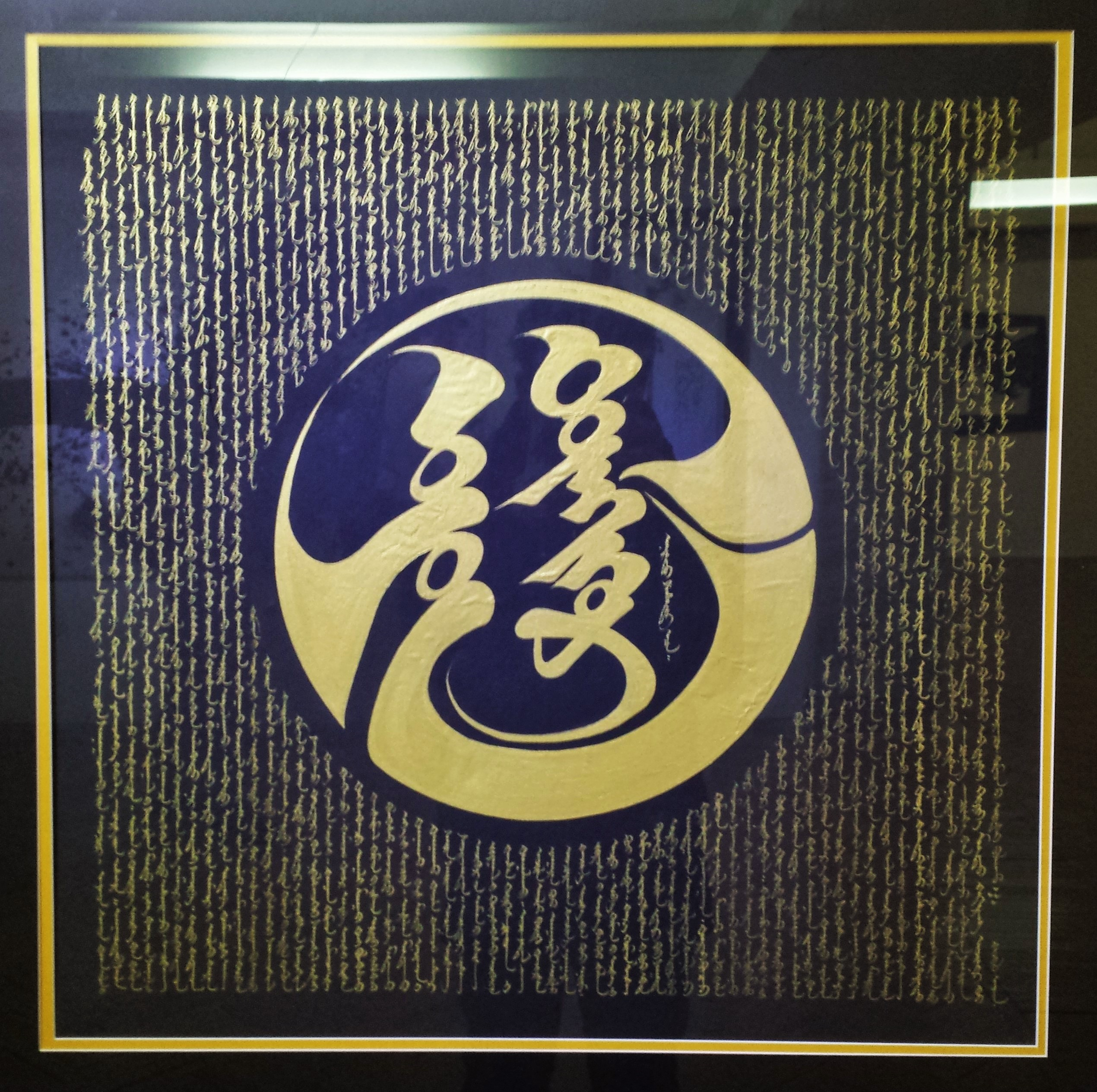
Mongolian calligraphy of the 13th century work Оюун Түлхүүр (Key of Intelligence)

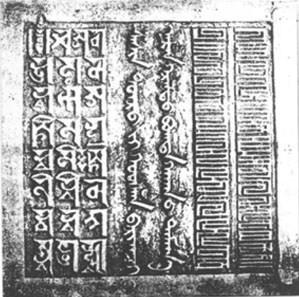
Imperial seal of the Bogd Khan, ca 1911.

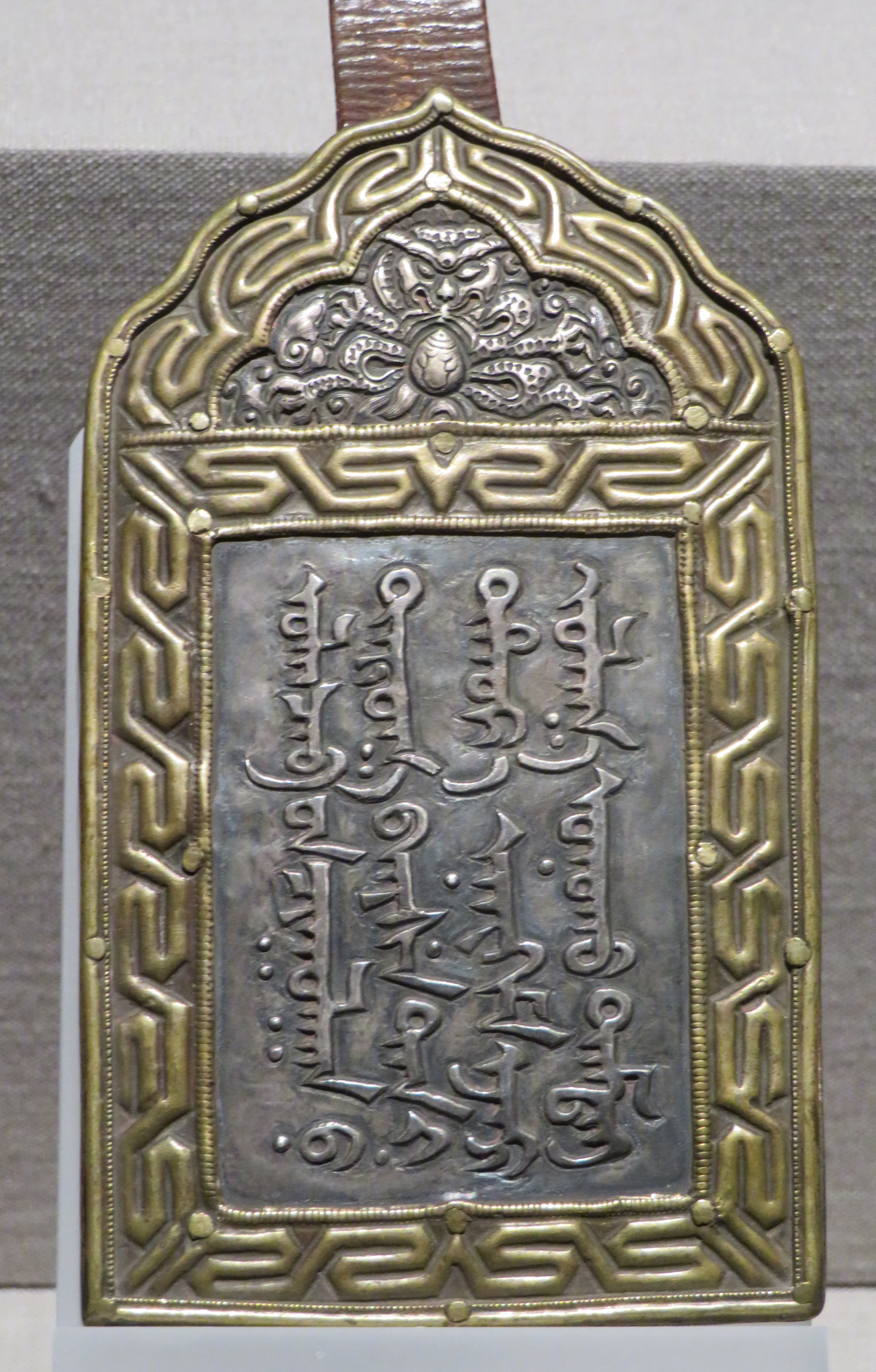
Mixed Manchu–Mongolian text on a Paiza.

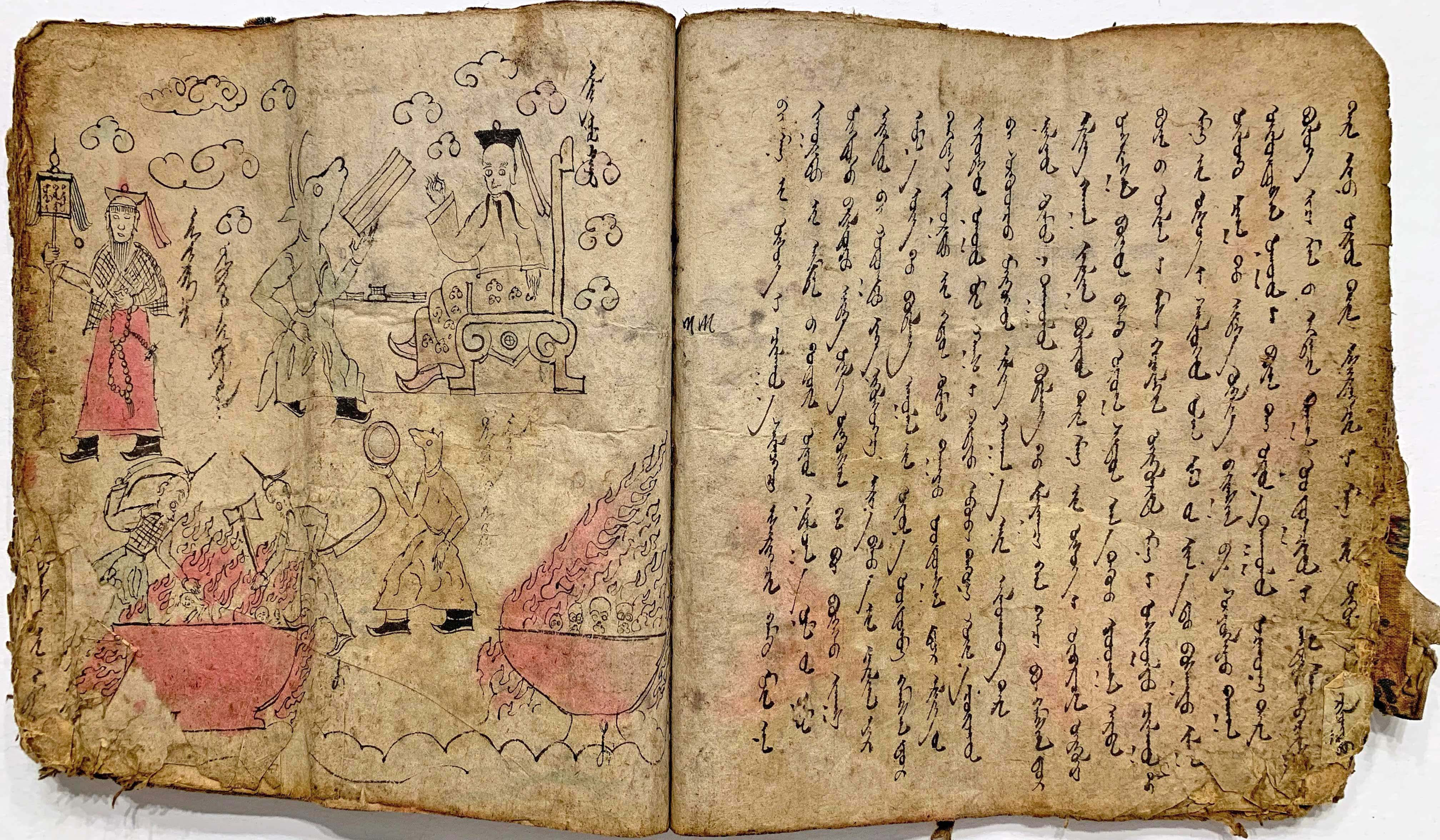
Brush-written Čoyijod Dagini manuscript, 19th century

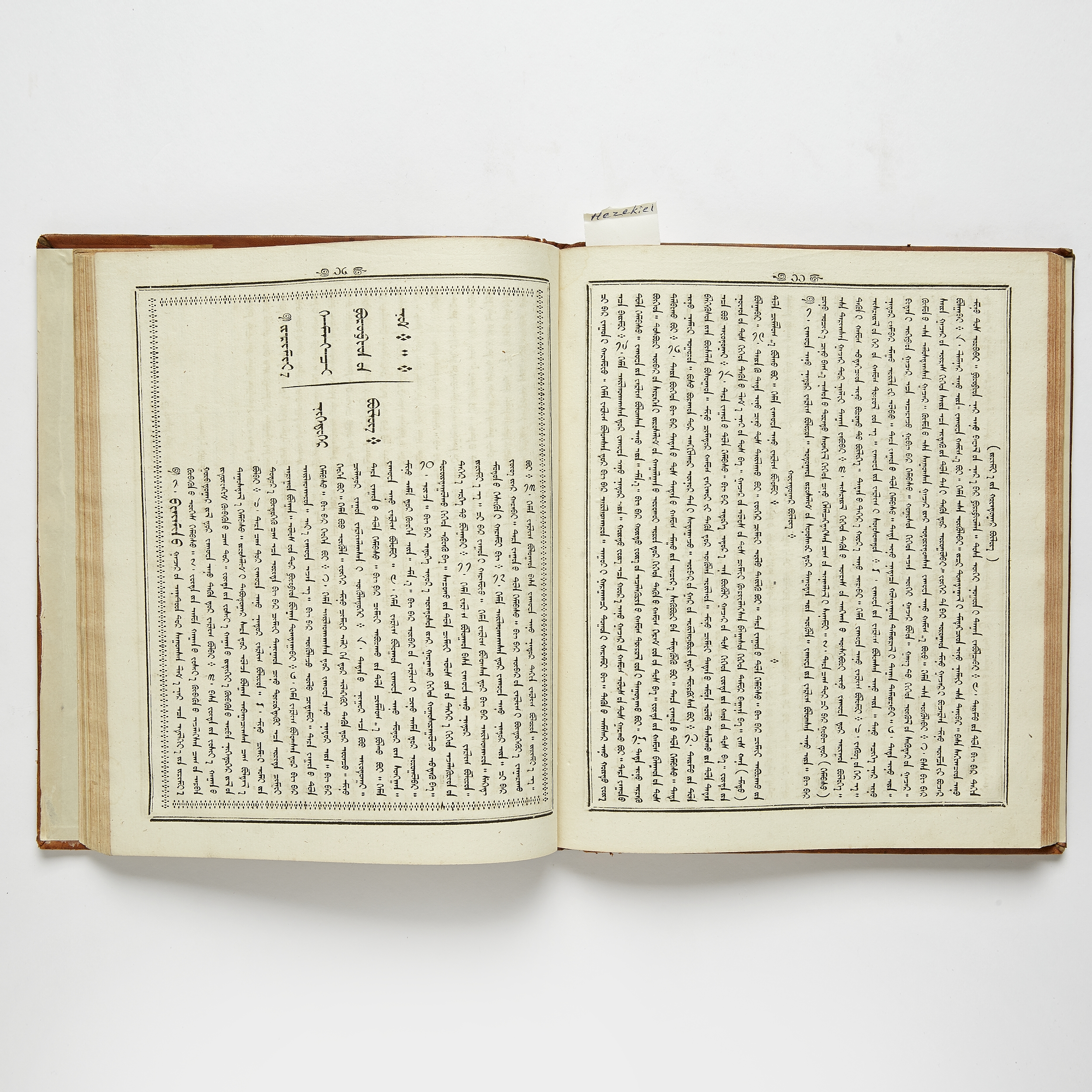
Book of Jeremiah, printed 1840 at Khodon in Siberia.

== In computing ==
Mongolian typewriters are known to exist.

In Inner Mongolia, work on digitized Mongolian began in the 1980s on the DOS platform, and by 1993, six different character sets had emerged.

Mongolian provides a unique challenge in that the script must be vertical while most applications are designed for horizontal text. In response to lack of mainstream support, programmers have developed bespoke Mongolian-first applications. On the Web, Mongolian text must be rotated into its correct orientation using the CSS setting writing-mode: vertical-lr.

In 2025, the Ministry of Digital Development, Innovation, and Communication of Mongolia with Bolorsoft published a keyboard for Android, iOS, and MacOS.

=== Unicode ===
The Mongolian script was added to the Unicode standard in September 1999 with the release of version 3.0. It was developed by Inner Mongolian linguists with minimal input from Mongolia.

However, the "phonetic model" embodied within was badly defined, leading to a profusion of alternative implementations, such as the Chinese "improved phonetic model" and the Mongolian "refined phonetic model". A competing "graphetic model" that concerns itself solely with visual outcomes instead of the phonetic identity of letters has also emerged. This has resulted in widespread inconsistency and incompatibility.

One criticism of the phonetic model is that different codepoint sequences can easily produce homoglyphs. For instance, o and u are written identically in the Mongolian script; the graphetic model uses one unified codepoint instead of two homoglyphic codepoints. A 2016 corpus study found that for writing the word for "Mongolia", ⟨muŋg_{VS1}ul⟩ was more common than ⟨moŋgol⟩, and that in total 11 different codepoint sequences were in use.

Another issue is that the phonetic model has multiple layers of FVS (free variation selectors), MVS, ZWJ, NNBSP, and those variation selections conflict with each other, which create incorrect results. Furthermore, different vendors understood the definition of each FVS differently, and developed multiple applications in different standards.

There is general consensus among experts and vendors on keeping the phonetic model. Unicode has committed to the phonetic model and argues that shifting to the graphetic model violates its stability policy.

In 2024, Kushim Jiang published a full description of the behavior expected in the phonetic model as Unicode Technical Note (UTN) #57. It has been adopted by Unicode and the People's Republic of China, while Mongolia's position remains unclear (as of 2025).

General adoption has been additionally hampered in Mongolia by lack of enforcement of traditional script usage and in China by a changed political climate after the 2020 language policy.

==== Blocks ====
The Unicode block for Mongolian is U+1800–U+18AF. It includes letters, digits and various punctuation marks for Hudum Mongolian, Todo Mongolian, Xibe (Manchu), Manchu proper, and Ali Gali, as well as extensions for transcribing Sanskrit and Tibetan.

Mongolian^{[1]}^{[2]}^{[3]} Official Unicode Consortium code chart (PDF)
	0	1	2	3	4	5	6	7	8	9	A	B	C	D	E	F
U+180x	᠀	᠁	᠂	᠃	᠄	᠅	᠆	᠇	᠈	᠉	᠊	FVS; 1	FVS; 2	FVS; 3	MVS	FVS; 4
U+181x	᠐	᠑	᠒	᠓	᠔	᠕	᠖	᠗	᠘	᠙						
U+182x	ᠠ	ᠡ	ᠢ	ᠣ	ᠤ	ᠥ	ᠦ	ᠧ	ᠨ	ᠩ	ᠪ	ᠫ	ᠬ	ᠭ	ᠮ	ᠯ
U+183x	ᠰ	ᠱ	ᠲ	ᠳ	ᠴ	ᠵ	ᠶ	ᠷ	ᠸ	ᠹ	ᠺ	ᠻ	ᠼ	ᠽ	ᠾ	ᠿ
U+184x	ᡀ	ᡁ	ᡂ	ᡃ	ᡄ	ᡅ	ᡆ	ᡇ	ᡈ	ᡉ	ᡊ	ᡋ	ᡌ	ᡍ	ᡎ	ᡏ
U+185x	ᡐ	ᡑ	ᡒ	ᡓ	ᡔ	ᡕ	ᡖ	ᡗ	ᡘ	ᡙ	ᡚ	ᡛ	ᡜ	ᡝ	ᡞ	ᡟ
U+186x	ᡠ	ᡡ	ᡢ	ᡣ	ᡤ	ᡥ	ᡦ	ᡧ	ᡨ	ᡩ	ᡪ	ᡫ	ᡬ	ᡭ	ᡮ	ᡯ
U+187x	ᡰ	ᡱ	ᡲ	ᡳ	ᡴ	ᡵ	ᡶ	ᡷ	ᡸ							
U+188x	ᢀ	ᢁ	ᢂ	ᢃ	ᢄ	ᢅ	ᢆ	ᢇ	ᢈ	ᢉ	ᢊ	ᢋ	ᢌ	ᢍ	ᢎ	ᢏ
U+189x	ᢐ	ᢑ	ᢒ	ᢓ	ᢔ	ᢕ	ᢖ	ᢗ	ᢘ	ᢙ	ᢚ	ᢛ	ᢜ	ᢝ	ᢞ	ᢟ
U+18Ax	ᢠ	ᢡ	ᢢ	ᢣ	ᢤ	ᢥ	ᢦ	ᢧ	ᢨ	ᢩ	ᢪ					
Notes 1.As of Unicode version 18.0 2.Grey areas indicate non-assigned code points 3.The Unicode presentation form of U+1824 MONGOLIAN LETTER U is U+1824 FVS1 ᠤ᠋ Second Isolate Form, to distinguish it from the visually identical U+1823 MONGOLIAN LETTER O. For the same reason, the Unicode presentation form of U+1826 MONGOLIAN LETTER UE is U+1826 FVS2 ᠦ᠌ Third Isolate Form. See document N4752R2.

The Mongolian Supplement block (U+11660–U+1167F) was added to the Unicode Standard in June 2016 with the release of version 9.0:

Mongolian Supplement^{[1]}^{[2]} Official Unicode Consortium code chart (PDF)
	0	1	2	3	4	5	6	7	8	9	A	B	C	D	E	F
U+1166x	𑙠	𑙡	𑙢	𑙣	𑙤	𑙥	𑙦	𑙧	𑙨	𑙩	𑙪	𑙫	𑙬			
U+1167x																
Notes 1.As of Unicode version 18.0 2.Grey areas indicate non-assigned code points

=== Keyboard layout ===
The Windows Mongolian traditional script keyboard layout for personal computers is as follows:

==== Unshifted layout ====
FVS3	1 ᠑	2 ᠒	3 ᠓	4 ᠔	5 ᠕	6 ᠖	7 ᠗	8 ᠘	9 ᠙	0 ᠐	NNBSP	=		Backspace
Tab		Q ᠴ č	W ᠣ o	E ᠡ e	R ᠷ r	T ᠲ t	Y ᠶ y	U ᠦ ü	I ᠢ i	O ᠥ ö	P ᠫ p	(...) 〔	(...) 〕	(...) ᠁
Caps		A ᠠ a	S ᠰ s	D ᠳ d	F ᠹ f	G ᠭ ɣ/g	H ᠬ q/k	J ᠵ ǰ	K ᠺ g	L ᠯ l	; ︔	FVS1		Enter
Shift		\	Z ᠽ z	X ᠱ š	C ᠼ c	V ᠤ u	B ᠪ b	N ᠨ n	M ᠮ m	, ᠂	. ᠃	.	Shift	
Ctrl		Alt									Alt			Ctrl

==== Shifted layout ====
~	1 !	2 ⁈	3 ⁉	4 —	5 %	6 ZWNJ	7 ᠊	8 ZWJ	9 (	0)	MVS	+		Backspace
Tab			W ᠸ w	E ᠧ ē	R ᠿ ž							(...) 〈	(...) 〉	(...) |
Caps							H ᠾ h		K ᠻ kh	L ᡀ lh	: ᠄	FVS2		Enter
Shift			Z ᡁ zh		C ᡂ ch			N ᠩ ng		, 《	. 》	?	Shift	
Ctrl		Alt									Alt			Ctrl

== See also ==
- Mongolian writing systems
  - Mongolian script
    - Mongolian script multigraphs
    - Galik alphabet
    - Todo alphabet
  - ʼPhags-pa script
    - Horizontal square script
  - Soyombo script
  - Mongolian Latin alphabet
    - SASM/GNC romanization § Mongolian
  - Mongolian Cyrillic alphabet
  - Mongolian transliteration of Chinese characters
  - Mongolian Braille
- Mongolian Sign Language
- Mongolian name

== Sources ==
- Lee, Wai-Sum; Zee, Eric (2003). "Standard Chinese (Beijing)". Journal of the International Phonetic Association. 33 (1): 109–112. doi:10.1017/S0025100303001208.
- Duanmu, San (2007). The Phonology of Standard Chinese (2nd ed.). Oxford: Oxford University Press.
- Lin, Yen-Hwei (2007). The Sounds of Chinese. Cambridge: Cambridge University Press.
