= Mongolian Supplement =

- Range: U+11660..U+1167F (32 code points)
- Plane: SMP
- Scripts: Mongolian
- Assigned: 13 code points
- Unused: 19 reserved code points

Unicode version history
- 9.0 (2016): 13 (+13)

Unicode documentation
- Code chart ∣ Web page

Mongolian Supplement is a Unicode block containing additional Mongolian letters not found in Mongolian block in BMP. It currently comprises nine variant forms of birga marks used to mark the start of text.

Mongolian Supplement^{[1]}^{[2]} Official Unicode Consortium code chart (PDF)
	0	1	2	3	4	5	6	7	8	9	A	B	C	D	E	F
U+1166x	𑙠	𑙡	𑙢	𑙣	𑙤	𑙥	𑙦	𑙧	𑙨	𑙩	𑙪	𑙫	𑙬			
U+1167x																
Notes: 1. As of Unicode version 16.0; 2. Grey areas indicate non-assigned code points

== History ==
The following Unicode-related documents record the purpose and process of defining specific characters in the Mongolian Supplement block:

Version	Final code points (Note: Proposed code points and characters names may differ from final code points and names)	Count	L2 ID	WG2 ID	Document
9.0	U+11660..1166C	13	L2/14-030		Bell, Aaron; Eck, Greg; Glass, Andrew; West, Andrew (2014-01-17), Encoding Mongolian head letters
9.0	U+11660..1166C	13	L2/14-067	N4542	Bell, Aaron; Eck, Greg; Glass, Andrew; West, Andrew (2014-02-06), Proposal to encode five Mongolian head letters
9.0	U+11660..1166C	13	L2/14-026		Moore, Lisa (2014-02-17), "C.6.3", UTC #138 Minutes
9.0	U+11660..1166C	13	L2/14-081	N4547	Comments on N4542 Five Mongolian Head Marks, 2014-02-19
9.0	U+11660..1166C	13	L2/14-100		Moore, Lisa (2014-05-13), "C.6.1", UTC #139 Minutes
9.0	U+11660..1166C	13		N4553 (pdf, doc)	Umamaheswaran, V. S. (2014-09-16), "10.3.9", Minutes of WG 2 meeting 62 Adobe, San Jose, CA, USA
9.0	U+11660..1166C	13	L2/14-240	N4632	A Letter to the Authors of N4542 (5 Birgas in Mongolian Block), 2014-09-23
9.0	U+11660..1166C	13	L2/14-259		Whistler, Ken; Anderson, Deborah (2014-10-21), WG2 Consent Docket
9.0	U+11660..1166C	13	L2/14-250		Moore, Lisa (2014-11-10), "C.12", UTC #141 Minutes
9.0	U+11660..1166C	13	L2/16-052	N4603 (pdf, doc)	Umamaheswaran, V. S. (2015-09-01), "M63.02c, M63.03a", Unconfirmed minutes of WG 2 meeting 63
