= Pentaglot Dictionary =

18th century dictionary in five languages

The first page of the astronomy section of the Yuzhi Wuti Qing Wenjian. The work contains four terms on each of its pages, arranged in the order of Manchu, Tibetan, Mongolian, Chagatai, and Chinese languages. For Tibetan, it includes both transliteration and a transcription into the Manchu alphabet. For the Chagatai, it includes a line of transcription into the Manchu alphabet.

The Pentaglot Dictionary (Chinese: 御製五體清文鑑; pinyin: Yuzhi Wuti Qing Wenjian), (Note: the term 清文, Qingwen, "Qing language", was another name for the Manchu language in Chinese) also known as the Manchu Polyglot Dictionary, was a dictionary of major imperial languages compiled in the late Qianlong era of the Qing dynasty (also said to be compiled in 1794). The work contains Manchu lexemes and their translations into various administrative languages such as Tibetan, Mongolian, post-classical or vernacular Chagatai (known as Uyghur since 1921) and Chinese.

== Title ==
The literal meaning of the Chinese title (御製五體清文鑑, Yù zhì wǔ tǐ Qīng wén jiàn) is "Imperially-Published Five-Script Textual Mirror of Qing", which is translated into the other languages are as follows:

- Manchu language:

Manchu: ᡥᠠᠨ ᡳ ᠠᡵᠠᡥᠠ ᠰᡠᠨᠵᠠ ᡥᠠᠴᡳᠨ ᡳ ᡥᡝᡵᡤᡝᠨ ᡴᠠᠮᠴᡳᡥᠠ ᠮᠠᠨᠵᡠ ᡤᡳᠰᡠᠨ ᡳ ᠪᡠᠯᡝᡴᡠ ᠪᡳᡨ᠌ᡥᡝ᠈, Möllendorff: han-i araha sunja hacin-i hergen kamciha manju gisun-i buleku bithe, Abkai: han-i araha sunja haqin-i hergen kamqiha manju gisun-i buleku bithe
"dictionary of Manchu words written by the Emperor (i.e., by imperial order) containing five languages"

- Tibetan:

rgyal pos mdzad pa’i skad lnga shan sbyar gyi manydzu’i skad gsal ba’i me long
རྒྱལ་པོས་མཛད་པའི་སྐད་ལྔ་ཤན་སྦྱར་གྱི་མཉཛུའི་སྐད་གསལ་བའི་མེ་ལོང་།

- Mongolian:

qaɣan-u bičigsen tabun ǰüil-ün üsüg-iyer qabsuruɣsan manǰu ügen-ü toli bičig
ᠬᠠᠭᠠᠨ ᠤ ᠪᠢᠴᠢᠭᠰᠡᠨ ᠲᠠᠪᠤᠨ ᠵᠦᠢᠯ ᠦᠨ ᠦᠰᠦᠭ ᠢᠶᠡᠷ ᠬᠠᠪᠰᠤᠷᠤᠭᠰᠠᠨ ᠮᠠᠨᠵᠤ ᠦᠭᠡᠨ ᠦ ᠲᠣᠯᠢ ᠪᠢᠴᠢᠭ᠌᠈

- Chagatai:

ḫān-nïng fütügän beš qismi qošqan ḫat mānjū söz-ning ayrïmčïn ḫati
خان نينگ فوتوکن بش قسمی قوشقان خت مانجو سوزنينگ آيری مجين ختی

== Structure ==
The Yuzhi Wuti Qing Wenjian is organized into six boxes, containing 36 volumes on 2563 pages. The original work contained 32 volumes, with a four-volume supplement. It is divided into divisions (such as "Heaven Division"), category (such as "Astronomy"), with the categories further separated into types. There are 56 divisions, 318 categories, 616 types, with a total of 18,671 terms. Each term has eight rows. From the top, the rows contain Manchu, Tibetan, a mechanical Tibetan transliteration into Manchu, a phonetic Tibetan transcription into Manchu, Mongolian, Chagatai, a transcription of Chagatai into Manchu, and Chinese.

For some terms, synonyms were included in the target languages (except Chinese). Thus, there are 19,503 terms used in Mongolian corresponding to 18,145 terms in Chinese (with 526 synonyms noted in Chinese). The Manchu text was largely based on the Beijing dialect of Manchu, using vertical regular script, with sentences terminated with punctuation (᠈), but no subsidiary pronunciation marks. Tibetan used the common written Tibetan usage at the time, in horizontal script in Uchen script (དབུ་ཅན་), with terms that could not be written into a single line divided at syllabic boundaries, and terminating punctuation marks (།). Under the Tibetan was the Manchu transliteration, using Manchu phonemes to transliterate Tibetan letters to allow two-way transliteration and using distinctive characters for initial and medial phonemes; further, to transliterate some Tibetan letters, some new written forms for Manchu phonemes were invented (including initial ng and terminal vowels). Below the Manchu transliteration was the Manchu transcription to record the pronunciation in the Lhasa/Ü-Tsang dialect, due to the substantial difference between written Tibetan and spoken Tibetan. For Mongolian, the common written Mongolian of that time was used, in horizontal regular script, with punctuation marks at the end (᠈). Chagatai is written horizontally in Nastaʿlīq script, with terms that could not be written into a single line divided at syllabic boundaries and no terminal punctuations. Below Chagatai was Manchu transcription to record the eastern Xinjiang Turkic pronunciation, due to the substantial difference between Chagatai and the spoken language of Xinjiang at the time; the sounds showed characteristics of the pronunciations used in the Hami/Turpan regions; Chinese was spelled in traditional Chinese characters, also in vertical regular script, with the diction showing the influence of common usage in the Beijing Mandarin dialect. No punctuation or pronunciation marks were used.

Below were the renderings of the first term, "Heaven," on the first page of the first section, "Astronomy":

explanation	entry	Latin transcription
Entry in Manchu	ᠠᠪᡴᠠ᠈	abka
Tibetan translation	གནམ།	gnam
Transliteration of Tibetan into Manchu letters	ᡤᠨᠠᠮ	gnam
Transcription of the Tibetan pronunciation in Manchu script	ᠨᠠᠮ	nam
Translation into Mongolian	ᠲᠩᠷᠢ᠈	t[e]ngri
Translation into Chagatai	آسمان	āsmān
Transcription of Chagatai in Manchu script	ᠠᠰᠮᠠᠨ	asman
Translation into Chinese	天	tiān

== Manuscripts and editions ==
The dictionary has been transmitted in three known manuscripts, held by the Beijing Palace Museum, the Yonghe Temple, and the British Museum in London. A print edition doesn’t seem to exist. In 1957, the Publishing House of Minority Nationalities published a photo-mechanic reproduction of the dictionary, which was reprinted in 1998. In 1967, Japanese scholars recompiled it and added Latin transliteration into a work known as the Interpretation of the Wuti Qing Wenjian. In 1967, an edition was published in Japan that added transliterations of Manchu, the Manchu transcriptions of the other languages and a Japanese translation. In 2013, a critical edition with complete transliterations as well as indices for all five languages was published in Germany.

- Tamura Jitsuzō (田村 實造), Imanishi Shunjū (今西 春秋), Satō Hisashi (佐藤 長) (Hg.): Gotai Shinbun kan yakukai 五體淸文鑑譯解. Kyōto, Kyōto daigaku bungakubu nairiku Ajia kenkyūjo 京都大學文學部內陸アジア硏究所 Shōwa 41–43 [1966–1968].
- Corff, Oliver; Maezono, Kyoko; Lipp, Wolfgang; Dorj, Dorjpalam; Gerelmaa, Görööchin; Mirsultan, Aysima; Stüber, Réka; Töwshintögs, Byambajav; Li, Xieyan, eds. (2013). Auf kaiserlichen Befehl erstelltes Wörterbuch des Manjurischen in fünf Sprachen. "Fünfsprachenspiegel". Systematisch angeordneter Wortschatz auf Manjurisch, Tibetisch, Mongolisch, Turki und Chinesisch (in German). Wiesbaden: Harrassowitz. ISBN 978-3-447-06970-0.

The dictionary is based on the Imperially-Published Four-Script Textual Mirror of Qing (御製四體清文鑑; Yuzhi Siti Qing Wenjian), with Chagatai added as fifth language.

The four-language version of the dictionary with Tibetan was in turn based on an earlier three-language version with Manchu, Mongolian, and Chinese called the Imperially-Published Manchu Mongol Chinese Three pronunciation explanation mirror of Qing (御製滿珠蒙古漢字三合切音清文鑑; Yuzhi Manzhu Menggu Hanzi San He Jieyin Qingwen Jian, Mongolian: (Qaɣan-u bicigsen) Manzu Mongɣol Kitad üsüg ɣurban züil-ün ajalɣu nejilegsen toli bicig).

The three-language version was in turn based on the Imperially-Published Revised and Enlarged mirror of Qing (御製增訂清文鑑; Yuzhi Zengding Qing Wenjian, Manchu: Han-i araha nonggime toktobuha Manju gisun-i buleku bithe) in Manchu and Chinese, which used both Manchu script to transcribe Chinese words and Chinese characters to transcribe Manchu words with fanqie. It was used in banner schools as a textbook.

A tetraglot dictionary (御製増訂清文鑑; Yuzhi Zengding Qing Wenjian) in manuscript form exists in the Harvard-Yenching Library, where black ink is used for Chinese and Manchu and red ink for Tibetan and Mongolian. In 1708 the Yuzhi Qing Wenjian (御制清文鉴, "han-i araha manju gisun buleku bithe") was published.

== See also ==
- Hua-Yi yiyu ("Sino-Barbarian Dictionary") - a series of bilingual Chinese-foreign language dictionaries in Jurchen, Korean, Japanese, Ryukyuan, Mongolian, Old Uyghur, Vietnamese, Cham, Dai, Thai, Burmese, Khmer, Persian, Tibetan, Malay, Javanese, Acehnese, and Sanskrit
- Yuding Xiyu Tongwen Zhi (欽定西域同文志, "Imperial Western Regions Thesaurus")- a thesaurus of geographical names in Xinjiang in Oirat Mongol, Manchu, Chinese, Tibetan, and Chagatai.
- Mahāvyutpatti
