= Huayi yiyu =

Sino-Barbarian vocabulary

The Huáyí yìyǔ (Chinese: 華夷譯語; lit. 'Sino-Foreign vocabularies') refers to a series of vocabularies produced by Ming and Qing dynasty Chinese administration for the study of foreign languages. They are a precious source of phonological information, both for the study of Chinese pronunciation and for the study of the languages in question.

== Categorization ==
The relevant works of the huáyí yìyǔ fall into four categories:

1. A Sino-Mongolian vocabulary compiled by Huo Yuanjie (火源潔).
2. Vocabularies that were compiled and re-edited in the Siyiguan (四夷館).
3. Vocabularies prepared by the Huitongguan (會同館).
4. Qing dynasty vocabularies.

=== Languages covered in the Siyiguan ===
The languages covered by works in the second class include:

- 韃靼 Mongolian
- 女直 Jurchen
- 西番 “Western Barbarians” (Khams Tibetan)
- 西天 "India" (Middle Indo-Aryan languages)
- 回回 Early New Persian,
- 高昌 Uighur
- 百夷 Daic languages
- 緬甸 Burmese
- 八百 Babai (Lanna)
- 暹羅 Siamese

Tatsuo Nishida published a book studying each, the Tibetan, Burmese, Tosu and Lolo languages as recorded in the Hua-yi yiu.

=== Languages covered in the Huitongguan ===
The languages covered by works in the third class covered:

- 朝鮮 Korean
- 琉球 Ryukyuan
- 日本 Japanese
- 安南 (Annan) Vietnamese
- 暹羅 Siamese
- 韃靼 Khitan (the Eastern Mongols)
- 畏兀兒/委兀兒 Uighur
- 滿剌加 Malaccan Malay
- 占城 Champa of southern Vietnam
- 西番 ('Western Barbarians') Khams Tibetan
- 回回 Persian
- 女直 Jurchen
- 百夷 Bai

== See also ==
- Pearl in the Palm
- Pentaglot Dictionary
