= List of Khitan inscriptions =

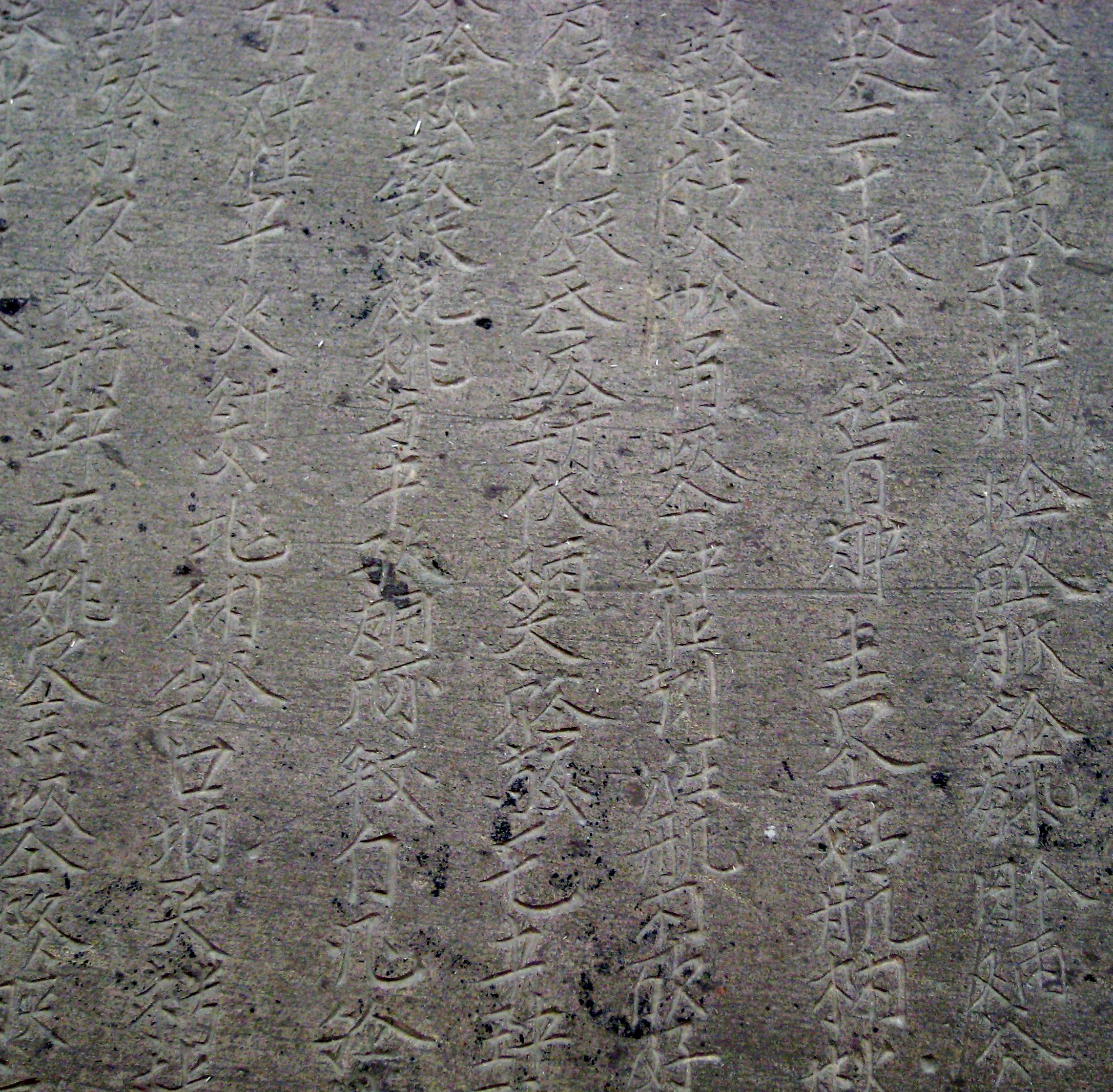
Detail of Khitan small script on the epitaph of Yelü Dilie (1026–1092)

The list of Khitan inscriptions comprises a list of the corpus of known inscriptions written in the Khitan large script and the Khitan small script. These two scripts were used by the Khitan people in northern China during the 10th through 12th centuries for writing the extinct Khitan language. The Khitan language was in use during the Liao dynasty (916–1125), the Western Liao dynasty (1124–1218) and the Jin dynasty (1115–1234), but the last recorded Khitan speaker, Yelü Chucai, died in 1244, and the language probably became extinct soon afterwards.

There are no surviving examples of printed texts in the Khitan language, and aside from five example Khitan large characters with Chinese glosses in the Yuan and Ming-era Tao Zongyi's 1376 Important Matters in the History of Calligraphy, there are no Chinese glossaries or dictionaries of Khitan. The Khitan language is therefore little understood, and the two Khitan writing systems are only partially deciphered.

The main source of Khitan texts are monumental inscriptions, mostly comprising memorial tablets buried in the tombs of Khitan nobility. Only one monument in a Khitan script was known before the 20th century, the Record of the Journey of the Younger Brother of the Emperor of the Great Jin Dynasty (Langjun xingji 郎君行記), which is engraved on the 'wordless stele' for Empress Wu Zetian which stands at the Qianling Mausoleum. Until the 1920s it was believed to be written in the Jurchen script. Only after the discovery of the memorial tablets of the Emperor Xingzong of Liao and his consort was it realized that the Record of the Younger Brother of the Emperor and the Liao-dynasty memorial tablets were both written in a Khitan script. Several more memorial tablets in the same script were discovered during the 1930s, including memorials for the Emperor Daozong of Liao and his consort. Initially it was not clear whether the script inscribed on these memorial tablets was the Khitan large script, recorded to have been devised in 920, or the Khitan small script, recorded to have been devised about 925. A different, unknown script, which appeared more similar to Chinese (incorporating many characters borrowed directly from Chinese), had been discovered on a temple monument in 1935, as well as on a memorial to Xiao Xiaozhong in 1951; and in 1962 Jin Guangping suggested that these two monuments were written using the Khitan large script, and that the Record of the Younger Brother of the Emperor and the imperial memorial tablets were written using the Khitan small script. This identification of the two Khitan scripts is now widely accepted.

There are about 15 known monuments with inscriptions in the Khitan large script, ranging in date from 986 to 1176, and about 40 known monuments with inscriptions in the Khitan small script, ranging in date from 1053 to 1171. The two scripts are mutually exclusive (never occurring together on the same monument), but it is not known why the Khitan people used two different scripts, or what determined the choice of which script to use.

In addition to monumental inscriptions, short inscriptions in both Khitan scripts have also been found on tomb murals and rock paintings, and on various portable artefacts such as mirrors, amulets, paiza (tablets of authority given to officials and envoys), and special non-circulation coins. A number of bronze official seals with the seal face inscribed in the Khitan large script are also known. The Khitan characters on these seals are engraved in a convoluted calligraphic style that imitates the Chinese nine-fold seal script style of calligraphy.

== Monumental inscriptions in the Khitan large script ==
Monument	Image	Date	Place of discovery	Year of discovery	Current Location	Description
Commemoration of a battle victory by Hutenu (Yelü Zhaosan 耶律趙三)		1084	Salbar Mountains, Mörön, Khentii Province; Mongolia; 47.40°N 110.30°E	1950s	In situ	4 lines, 25 characters.
Inscribed sarcophagus	Rubbing of sarcophagus from Gengzhangzi Village with Khitan large script		Gengzhangzi Village, Jianchang County; Liaoning; 40.76°N 119.82°E	1977	Jianchang County Museum	8 lines, 19 characters (badly damaged as the sarcophagus was cut into three pieces).
Memorial at Jing'an Temple (靜安寺) erected by the Lady of Lanling Commandery (蘭陵郡夫人), the wife of Yelü Changyun		1072	Ruins of Jing'an Temple, Ningcheng County; Inner Mongolia; 42.087°N 119.108°E	1935	Liao Zhongjing Museum	40 lines, 70 characters (very worn, and almost illegible).
Epitaph for Lady Xiao Chen'ge (蕭陳哥別胥) (Note: This was previously known as the Epitaph for an unknown person or Epitaph of the Second Year of Qingning. It was only known from a photograph of a rubbing shown to Liu Fengzhu in late January 1997 and had 27 lines of neat text, with the name of Empress Dowager Chengtian (承天太后) appearing twice and the date "the second year of Qingning" (清寧二年) appearing once. An epitaph with those characteristics was found in Chifeng, Inner Mongolia in 2018.)		1056	Chifeng; Inner Mongolia 42.26°N 118.88°E	before 1997; rediscovered 2018	Unknown	27 lines, 1,056 characters.
Epitaph for Court Attendant Dorlipun 多羅里本郎君 (1037–1080)	Rubbing of the Epitaph for Court Attendant Dorlipun	1081	Tsogt Mountain, Guriban Hushu Gacha, Ar Horqin Banner; Inner Mongolia; 44.45°N 120.17°E	1999	Ar Horqin Banner Museum	21 lines, 800 characters.
Epitaph for Court Attendant Li Ai 李爱郎君 (Note: This monument was previously known as the Yingli period monument (Yingli bei 應歷碑), but the characters that were originally interpreted as meaning the Yingli 應歷 period (951–969) are now interpreted as meaning the Dading 大定 period (1161–1189), so what was once thought to be the earliest Khitan memorial is now thought to be the latest in date.)		1176	Unknown (only known from a rubbing)	before 1985	Unknown	16 lines, 470 characters.
Epitaph for the Grand Preceptor (太師)		1056	Unknown (only known from a rubbing)	before 1939	Unknown	40 lines, 1,800 characters.
Epitaph for the Grand Prince of the North 北大王 (Yelü Wanxin 耶律萬辛, 972–1041)	Rubbing of the Epitaph for the Grand Prince of the North	1041	Kundu Township, Ar Horqin Banner; Inner Mongolia; 43.83°N 121.12°E	1975	Ar Horqin Banner Museum	27 lines, 783 characters.
Epitaph for the Princess of Yongning Commandery 永寧郡公主 (1033–1091)	Rubbing of the Epitaph for the Princess of Yongning Commandery (1033-1091)	1092	Wangjiagou Village, Bairin Left Banner; Inner Mongolia; 44.07°N 119.475°E	2000	Liao Shangjing Museum	36 lines, 1,486 characters.
Epitaph for Xiao Paolu 蕭袍魯 (1018–1089)	Rubbing of the Epitaph for Xiao Paolu (1018-1089)	1090	Qianshan Village, Faku County; Liaoning; 42.58°N 123.56°E	1965	Liaoning Provincial Museum	15 lines, 323 characters.
Epitaph for Xiao Xiaozhong 蕭孝忠 (d.1089)		1089	Xigu Mountain, Huludao, Liaoning; 40.896°N 120.498°E	1951	Liaoning Provincial Museum	18 lines, 540 characters.
Epitaph for Yelü Changyun 耶律昌允 (1000–1061)		1062	Ta Mountain, Yuanbaoshan District; Inner Mongolia; 42.09°N 119.10°E	2000	Chifeng City Yuanbaoshan District Office of Cultural Relics	30 lines, 878 characters.
Epitaph for Yelü Qi 耶律褀 or Yelü Asi 耶律阿思 (1033–1108)		1108	Tsogt Mountain, Guriban Hushu Gacha, Ar Horqin Banner; Inner Mongolia; 44.45°N 120.17°E	1993	Institute of Cultural and Historical Relics and Archaeology of the Inner Mongolia Autonomous region	46 lines, 2,845 characters.
Epitaph for Yelü Xinie 耶律習涅 (1063–1114)	Rubbing of the Epitaph for Yelü Xinie (1063-1114)	1114	Xiaohan Mountain, Bairin Left Banner; Inner Mongolia; 44.60°N 119.35°E	1987	Liao Shangjing Museum	37 lines, 1,608 characters.
Epitaph for Yelü Yanning 耶律延寧 (946–985)	Rubbing of the Epitaph for Yelü Yanning	986	Baimu Mountain, Chaoyang County; Liaoning; 41.63°N 120.20°E	1964	Liaoning Provincial Museum	19 lines, 271 characters.
Stele fragments from the mausoleum of Emperor Taizu of Liao (r. 916–926)	Fragment of a stone memorial inscription from the site of the mausoleum of Emperor Taizu of Liao		Shifangzi Village, Bairin Left Banner; Inner Mongolia; 43.88°N 119.13°E	1966 and later	Inner Mongolia Museum and Liao Shangjing Museum	Ten fragments of stone slabs engraved with Khitan large script characters.
Stele fragments from the ruins of the Liao Superior Capital Shangjing	Fragment of a stone memorial inscription from the site of the Liao Superior Capital		Lindong Township, Bairin Left Banner; Inner Mongolia; 43.96°N 119.39°E	1965 and later	Liao Shangjing Museum	Four fragments of stone slabs engraved with Khitan large script characters.
Monumental stone inscription	Stele with Khitan large script inscription, held at the National Museum of Mongolia in Ulaanbaatar, Mongolia	1058	Dornogovi Province; Mongolia; 44.88°N 110.15°E	2010	National Museum of Mongolian History, Ulan Bator	7 lines, about 150 characters.

== Other inscriptions in the Khitan large script ==
Object	Date	Place of discovery	Year of discovery	Current Location	Description
Rock inscription		Agui Cave, Jarud Banner; Inner Mongolia; 45.10°N 120.72°E			7 Khitan large characters painted on the outside of a cave.
Two wooden tablets from a Liao dynasty tomb		Daiqin Tala Sumu, Horqin Right Middle Banner; Inner Mongolia; 45.22°N 121.52°E	1999		Two wooden tablets inscribed with inventories.
Bronze, silver or gold non-circulation coin		Various examples have been found in different locations.			Four character Khitan inscription on the obverse, interpreted as meaning tiāncháo wànshùn 天朝萬順 in Chinese
Silver non-circulation coin	Silver coin on display at the Liao Shangjing Museum in Barin Left Banner	Ruins of the Liao capital Shangjing, Lindong Township, Bairin Left Banner; Inner Mongolia; 43.96°N 119.39°E	1977	Liao Shangjing Museum	Four character Khitan inscription (tiāncháo wànshùn 天朝萬順) on the obverse, with an eight character Khitan inscription scratched onto the reverse
Bronze mirror		White Pagoda in the ruins of Qingzhou City, Bairin Right Banner; Inner Mongolia; 44.202°N 118.514°E	1958	Inner Mongolia Museum	Five Khitan characters engraved on along the edge of the mirror
Bronze Daoist amulet	A bronze tablet or Daoist amulet inscribed on both sides with Khitan large script.	Acheng District; Harbin; Heilongjiang; 45.55°N 127.0°E		Heilongjiang Museum	Daoist charm on one side, and 2 lines (18 characters) of Khitan large script on the other.
Bronze Daoist amulet	A bronze tablet or Daoist amulet with a stylized face on one side and Khitan large script text on the other.	Subrag Sumu, Bairin Right Banner; Inner Mongolia; 44.193611°N 118.5111°E	1982	Bairin Right Banner Museum	Daoist charm on one side, and 3 lines (28 characters) of Khitan large script on the other.
Silver paiza		Chengde; Hebei; 41.00°N 117.56°E		Institute of East Asian History, Kyoto University	Chinese inscription (天賜成吉思皇帝聖旨疾 "Bestowed by Heaven, the imperial edict of Emperor Chinggis. Urgent.") on one side, and two Khitan large characters meaning "running horse" (Chinese 走馬) on the back.
Metal tag		Unknown		Unknown	Three Khitan large characters.
Silver spoon		Wangfugou, Jianping County; Liaoning; 42.23°N 119.48°E	1956	Liaoning Province Museum	Four Chinese characters (太付太太) followed by five Khitan large characters.
Bronze seal	1094	Panshan County; Liaoning; 41.25°N 122.00°E	1986	Panjin Museum	Seal face inscription is in Chinese ("Seal of the Prince of Qian" 汧王之印), but the upper surface of the seal has two lines of Khitan large characters that have been interpreted as meaning Yixin Ning Dawang 乙辛寧大王 ("Prince Yixinning") and Liao Da'an Shinian 遼大安十年 (10th year of the Liao dynasty Da'an era").

== Khitan large script seals ==
Object	Image	Place of discovery	Year of discovery	Current Location	Description
Bronze seal		Naiman Banner; Inner Mongolia; 42.85°N 120.65°E	1957	Inner Mongolia Museum	Five seal script characters.
Bronze seal		Dongtai Village, Ongniud Banner; Inner Mongolia; 42.95°N 119.05°E	1965	Chifeng Museum	Five seal script characters. The inscription on the face of the seal is repeated on the side as a single column of ordinary Khitan characters engraved in outline.
Pottery seal	Pottery seal	Site of the Liao capital Shangjing, Lindong Township, Bairin Left Banner; Inner Mongolia; 43.96°N 119.39°E	1975	Liao Shangjing Museum, Lindong	
Bronze seal		Baiyingou, Bairin Left Banner; Inner Mongolia; 43.92°N 119.55°E	1966	Unknown	
Bronze seal		White Pagoda in the ruins of Qingzhou City, Bairin Right Banner; Inner Mongolia; 44.202°N 118.514°E	1973	Chifeng Museum	
Bronze seal		Fengcheng; Liaoning; 40.45°N 124.05°E	1964	Liaoning Province Museum	Five seal script characters.
Bronze seal		Jianchang County; Liaoning; 40.80°N 119.85°E	1980	Liaoning Province Museum	
Bronze seal		Guliyingzi, Taonan; Jilin; 45.35°N 122.80°E	1937	Unknown	
Bronze seal		Unknown		Jilin Museum	
Bronze octagonal seal		Unknown		Jilin Museum	
Bronze seal		Weichang County; Hebei; 41.95°N 117.75°E		Inner Mongolia Museum	
Bronze seal		Unknown		Tianjin Museum	
Bronze seal		Xayar County; Xinjiang; 41.25°N 82.80°E	1952	National Museum of China	
Bronze seal		Ili County; Xinjiang; 43.90°N 81.30°E	1958	National Museum of China	
Bronze seal		Unknown		National Museum of China	Seal script inscription interpreted as meaning "Seal of the Right Vice Commander of the Marshal of the Army" (元帥右都監印).
Bronze seal		Unknown (impression owned by Luo Fuyi 羅福頤)		Unknown	
Bronze seal		Unknown (impression owned by Luo Fuyi 羅福頤)		Unknown	
Bronze seal		Xiuyan County; Liaoning; 40.28°N 123.28°E	1980	Xiuyan Museum	Inscription dated 1004 on top of the seal.
Bronze seal		Harqin Left Wing County; Liaoning; 41.13°N 119.75°E	1973	Harqin Left Wing County Museum	Five seal script characters.

== Monumental inscriptions in the Khitan small script ==
Monument	Image	Date	Place of discovery	Year of discovery	Current Location	Description
Epitaph for an unknown person			Haitangshan, Fuxin; Liaoning; 41.935°N 121.850°E	1991	Fuxin Museum	13 lines, 300 characters (the monument is missing the right side, and has been reused for engraving a Buddhist image on its reverse side).
Epitaph for Court Attendant Yelü Yongning 耶律永寧郎君 (1059–1087) (Note: Kane 2009 lists Khitan small script memorials for both Lord Yelü Yongning and a Lord Yelü, but the latter is not recorded in any other sources, and appears to be a synonym for the former.)		1088	Beigou, Harqin Banner; Inner Mongolia; 43.417°N 118.320°E	1995	Harqin Banner Museum	43 lines, 1,062 characters.
Epitaph for Deputy Administrator Yelü 耶律副部署 (Yelü Wumo 耶律兀没, 1031–1077), the brother or nephew of Yelü Qi		1102	Tsogt Mountain, Guriban Hushu Gacha, Ar Horqin Banner; Inner Mongolia; 44.45°N 120.17°E	1996	Inner Mongolia Museum	51 lines, 2,000 characters.
Epitaph for Emperor Daozong of Liao 道宗 (1032–1101)	Epitaph for Emperor Daozong in Khitan small script	1101	Mausoleum of Emperor Daozong, Bairin Right Banner; Inner Mongolia; 44.36°N 118.50°E	1930	Liaoning Provincial Museum	37 lines, 1,134 characters; and 6 lines, 36 characters in seal script calligraphy on the lid.
Epitaph for Emperor Xingzong of Liao 興宗 (1015–1054)		1055	Mausoleum of Emperor Xingzong, Bairin Right Banner; Inner Mongolia; 44.36°N 118.51°E	1922	Buried in an unknown location at the Imperial Mausoleum.	36 lines, 861 characters.
Epitaph for Empress Renyi 仁懿皇后 (?–1076)		1076	Mausoleum of Emperor Xingzong, Bairin Right Banner; Inner Mongolia; 44.36°N 118.51°E	1922	Buried in an unknown location at the Imperial Mausoleum.	32 lines, 575 characters.
Epitaph for Empress Xuanyi 宣懿皇后 (1040–1075)	Epitaph for Empress Xuanyi on display at the Liaoning Provincial Museum	1101	Mausoleum of Emperor Daozong, Bairin Right Banner; Inner Mongolia; 44.36°N 118.50°E	1930	Liaoning Provincial Museum	30 lines, 620 characters; and 4 lines, 16 characters in seal script calligraphy on the lid.
Epitaph for Gu Shizhong 顾士忠 (1015–1090)		1091		2009	Ethnic Museum of Inner Mongolia University	33 lines, 1,700 characters.
Epitaph for Madam Han 韓氏, second wife of the imperial son-in-law, Xiao Temei 蕭特每		1078	Unknown	Unknown		35 lines, 814 characters.
Epitaph for Madam Yelü 耶律氏 (Yelü Tabuye 耶律挞不也) (1081–1115), the daughter of Yelü Dilie 耶律敵烈		1115	Shanzuizi, Ongniud Banner; Inner Mongolia; 42.868°N 118.970°E	1962	Chifeng Museum	25 lines, 699 characters.
Epitaph for the Grand Preceptor Shilu 室魯太師 or Salan Shilu Taishi 撒懶室魯太師		1100	Yihebei Village, Jarud Banner; Inner Mongolia; 44.67°N 121.02°E	2000	Institute of Cultural and Historical Relics and Archaeology of the Inner Mongolia Autonomous region	15 lines, 150 characters.
Epitaph for Hudujin Shenmi 胡睹堇審密 or Xiao Hudujin 萧胡睹堇 (1041–1091), the nephew of Xiao Tuguci	Epitaph for Hudujin Shenmi	1091			Khitan Museum, Lindong, Bairin Left Banner, Inner Mongolia	39 lines, 1,500 characters.
Epitaph for the Imperial Consort of Song and Wei 宋魏國妃 (1056–1080), the wife of Yelü Hongben		1110	Mausoleum of Emperor Xingzong, Bairin Right Banner; Inner Mongolia; 44.36°N 118.50°E	1997	Bairin Right Banner Museum	24 lines, 670 characters.
Epitaph for the Jin Dynasty Defense Commissioner of Bozhou 金代博州防禦使 or the Jin Dynasty Superior General of Zhenguo Circuit 金代鎮國上將軍 (1079–1142)		1171	Laohugou Village, Aohan Banner; Inner Mongolia; 42.108°N 119.938°E	1993	Aohan Banner Museum	51 lines, 1,570 characters.
Epitaph for the Prefect of Zezhou 澤州刺史 (or the Prefect of Zhuozhou 涿州刺史) (?–1107)		1108	Nangou Village, Bairin Left Banner; Inner Mongolia; 44.400°N 119.465°E	1993	Liao Shangjing Museum	26 lines, 230 characters. Incomplete inscription because of damage to the stone (top right missing).
Epitaph for the Prince of Liang 梁國王 (Note: The memorials for the Prince of Liang and his wife, the Imperial Consort of the State of Liang (梁國太妃), were found together, and although the memorial for the Imperial Consort is in Chinese, Kane 2009 incorrectly lists it as being in the Khitan small script.)		1107	Guan Mountain, Fuxin; Liaoning; 42.157°N 121.957°E	2001		
Epitaph for the Prince of Xu 許王		1105	Wofenggou, Fuxin; Liaoning; 41.820°N 121.600°E	1977	Fuxin Cultural Center	64 lines, 2,163 characters; 1 line, 6 characters.
Epitaph for Prince Wotela 斡特剌 (1073–1099), the grandson of Gu Shizhong		1099		2009	Ethnic Museum of Inner Mongolia University	22 lines, 1,000 characters.
Epitaph for Xiao Dilu 蕭敵魯 (1061–1114), the nephew of Xiao Hudujin	Epitaph for Xiao Dilu on display at Inner Mongolia University	1114		2007	Ethnic Museum of Inner Mongolia University	26 lines, 520 characters.
Epitaph for Xiao Linggong 蕭令公 (Xiao Fuliu 蕭富留)		1057	Xishan Village, Fuxin; Liaoning; 41.764°N 121.380°E	1950	Liaoning Provincial Museum	32 lines, 594 characters.
Epitaph for Xiao Taishan 蕭太山 and Princess Yongqing 永清公主				2003		32 lines, 1,373 characters.
Epitaph for Xiao Tuguci 蕭圖古辭		1068	Fuxin; Liaoning; 42.01°N 121.65°E	2000		26 lines, 739 characters.
Epitaph for Xiao Zhonggong 蕭仲恭		1150	Xinglong County; Hebei; 40.40°N 117.50°E	1942	Hebei Province Office of Cultural Relics	50 lines, 2,442 characters; 3 lines, 9 characters on the lid.
Epitaph for Yelü Jiuli 耶律糺里 or Yelü Gui 耶律貴 (1061–1102) (Note: The name of the official commemorated by this inscription has been variously given as Yelü Guiyexi 耶律貴也稀, Yelü Gui 耶律貴, Yelü Diligu 耶律迪里姑, Yelü Gui-Diligu 耶律貴·迪里姑 and Yelü Yiliyan 耶律夷里衍.)		1102	Unknown	2002 (probably robbed from a tomb in the 1990s)		31 lines, 1,020 characters.
Epitaph for Yelü Cite 耶律慈特 (1043–1081)		1082	Baiyinwendu, Ar Horqin Banner; Inner Mongolia; 43.60°N 120.40°E	1997	Ar Horqin Banner Museum	30 lines, 930 characters.
Epitaph for Yelü Dilie 耶律迪烈 (1026–1092)	Memorial tablet for Yelü Dilie	1092	Gahaitu Township, Jarud Banner; Inner Mongolia; 44.92°N 121.06°E	1995	Liao and Jin City Wall Museum, Beijing	41 lines (32 on the main stone, and 9 on the bottom of the lid), 1,740 characters; 9 lines of Chinese seal script characters on the lid.
Epitaph for Yelü (Han) Dilie 耶律(韓)迪烈 (1034–1100)		1101	Baiyinhan Mountain, Baiyinwula, Bairin Left Banner; Inner Mongolia; 44.37°N 118.89°E	1996	Liao Shangjing Museum	34 lines, 1,350 characters.
Epitaph for Yelü Gaoshi 耶律高十 or Han Gaoshi 韓高十 (1015–?)		c.1076	Baiyinhan Mountain, Baiyinwula, Bairin Left Banner; Inner Mongolia; 44.35°N 118.87°E	1995	Liao Shangjing Museum	26 lines, 750 characters. Lower half of inscription is missing.
Epitaph for Yelü Hongben 耶律弘本 (1041–1110), the Imperial Grand Uncle 皇太叔祖 (1041–1110), the son of Emperor Xingzong and Empress Renyi		1110	Mausoleum of Emperor Xingzong, Bairin Right Banner; Inner Mongolia; 44.36°N 118.52°E	1997	Bairin Right Banner Museum	25 lines, 807 characters; 3 lines, 15 characters in seal script on the lid.
Epitaph for Yelü Hongbian 耶律弘辨 or Yelü Hongyong 耶律弘用 (1054–1086), the brother-in-law of the Imperial Consort of Song and Wei		1100	Orgon Tal, Jarud Banner; Inner Mongolia; 44.778°N 120.727°E	1996	Jarud Banner Cultural Relics Office	32 lines, 900 characters.
Epitaph for Yelü Jue 耶律玦 (1014–1070)		1072			Private museum at Xinhui, Aohan Banner	46 lines, 2,000 characters.
Epitaph for Yelü Nu 耶律奴 (1041–1098)		1099	Yaoyamen Village, Fuxin; Liaoning; 41.975°N 121.900°E	1999	Fuxin Museum	48 lines, 1,274 characters.
Epitaph for Yelü Renxian 耶律仁先		1072	Lianhuashan Village, Beipiao; Liaoning; 41.873°N 121.248°E	1983	Liaoning Cultural Relics and Archeology Research Institute	70 lines, 4,500 characters.
Epitaph for Yelü Taishi 耶律太師 (1038–1101), the son of Yelü Xiangwen		c.1101		2009	Ethnic Museum of Inner Mongolia University	26 lines, 1,000 characters.
Epitaph for Yelü Xiangwen 耶律詳穩 (1010–1091), the father of Yelü Taishi		1091		2007	Ethnic Museum of Inner Mongolia University	48 lines, 1,600 characters.
Epitaph for Yelü Zhixian 耶律智先		1094	Lianhuashan Village, Beipiao; Liaoning; 41.873°N 121.250°E	1998	Beipiao Museum	21 lines, 1,000 characters.
Epitaph for Yelü Zongjiao 耶律宗教 (992–1053)		1053	Gaoqi Village, Beizhen; Liaoning; 41.53°N 121.68°E	1991	Beizhen Cultural Relics Office	36 lines, 1,000 characters
Jade tablets from the supposed mausoleum of Emperor Jingzong of Liao			Xinli Tomb M2, at Yiwulü Mountain near Futun village, Beizhen; Liaoning41.652°N 121.762°E	2015–2018		Unknown.
Record of the Journey of the Younger Brother of the Emperor of the Great Jin Dynasty (Da Jin huangdi dutong jinglüe Langjun xingji 大金皇弟都統經略郎君行記)	Rubbing of the Record of the Journey of the Younger Brother of the Emperor of the Great Jin Dynasty	1134	Qianling Mausoleum, Qian County; Shaanxi; 34.575°N 108.220°E	first recorded in 1618	Qianling Mausoleum, Shaanxi	Engraved near the top of the 'wordless stele' for Empress Wu Zetian, comprising 5 columns of Khitan text on the right side, and a translation into Chinese in smaller characters on the left side, and a heading in Chinese seal script characters at the top (this is the only known bilingual Chinese-Khitan text).
Record of the Journey of the Younger Brother of the Emperor of the Great Jin Dynasty (fragment)		1134	Qianling Mausoleum, Qian County; Shaanxi; 34.575°N 108.220°E	1980	Qianling Mausoleum , Shaanxi	The broken top right part of a stele, engraved with the same Record of the Journey of the Younger Brother of the Emperor of the Great Jin Dynasty as found on the 'wordless stele', but only part of the seal script heading and the upper part of the Khitan text survives.

== Other inscriptions in the Khitan small script ==
Object	Image	Date	Place of discovery	Year of discovery	Current Location	Description
Bronze octagonal mirror owned by Wanyan Tong 完顏通		1140–1189	Da'an; Jilin; 45.50°N 124.30°E	1971	Jilin Provincial Museum	5 lines, 16 characters.
Bronze octagonal mirror	Bronze octagonal mirror from Inner Mongolia with a Khitan small script inscription comprising 4 characters				Inner Mongolia Museum	4 Khitan characters on the reverse, and three Chinese characters (寶坻) along the edge.
Bronze mirror	Bronze mirror from Korea with a Khitan small script inscription comprising 28 characters		Kaesŏng; North Korea; 37.96°N 126.55°E	before 1912	National Museum of Korea, Seoul	Khitan poem comprising 7 lines, 28 characters.
"Shouchang" non-circulation lucky coin	Shouchang coin with 4 characters of Khitan small script			before 1973	National Museum of China, Beijing	4 characters on the obverse, interpreted as 寿长福德 "Life is long due to fortune and virtue". One of two identical coins in the National Museum of China.
Fish-shaped bronze tally	Woodcut facsimile of a bronze fish tally with Small Khitan script inscription in the collection of Stephen Wootton Bushell (1844–1908)				Originally in the collection of Stephen Wootton Bushell (1844–1908); current whereabouts unknown.	Chinese character tóng 同, with one line of Khitan small characters.
Fish-shaped bronze tally						Chinese character tóng 同, with two lines of Khitan small characters.
Jade cup	Facsimile of Khitan small script characters on the bottom of a jade cup.				Originally in the Qing dynasty imperial collection, later acquired by John Calvin Ferguson, who donated it to Nanjing University Museum in 1934 where it is still held.	2 lines, 11 Khitan small characters on the base of the cup. Inscription by the Qianlong Emperor dated 1760 engraved on the inside bottom of the cup; this gives Qianlong's analysis of the Khitan characters and interpretation of the inscription, which Qianlong believed was a cryptic Chinese poem which could be revealed by deconstructing the mysterious characters.
Yellow-glazed ceramic brush washer						
Inscriptions on a pagoda		1173	White Pagoda, Hohhot; Inner Mongolia; 40.84°N 111.90°E			
Inscriptions on the walls of a cave			Balahada Cave (巴拉哈達洞), Horqin Right Middle Banner; Inner Mongolia			
Inscriptions on a Liao dynasty tomb mural			Bao Mountain, Ar Horqin Banner; Inner Mongolia; 44.073°N 119.666°E	1996		Short inscription on a mural.
Inscriptions on a painted wooden coffin			Ongniud Banner; Inner Mongolia; 42.93°N 119.03°E		Juu Uda League Cultural Relics Station	22 characters on the colour painting of a wooden coffin.
Inscriptions at the Liao imperial mausoleum			Bairin Right Banner; Inner Mongolia; 44.36°N 118.50°E			About 50 Khitan small character captions on murals at the east tomb.

== Khitan small script seals ==
Object	Date	Place of discovery	Year of discovery	Current Location	Description
Bronze seal		Gaizhou; Liaoning; 40.40°N 122.36°E	1972	Liaoning Province Museum	Seal script form Khitan small characters.

== See also ==
- List of Jurchen inscriptions
- Nova N 176, an undeciphered manuscript codex written in the Khitan large script
