= List of Khitanologists =

This list of Khitanologists includes those scholars who have made notable contributions to the study of the Khitan people, their culture, religion, history, language and writing systems (Khitan large script and Khitan small script).

Picture	Name	Dates	Nationality	Significant contributions
	Aisin-Gioro Ulhicun ᠠᡳ᠌ᠰᡳᠨ ᡤᡳᠣᡵᠣ ᡠᠯᡥᡳᠴᡠᠨ	b. 1958	China/Japan	Study of Khitan Language and Script (2004); A Study of Newly Excavated Khitai Materials (2012); Total Decipherments of Epitaphs in Khitai Large and Small Scripts (2014)
	Chinggeltei ᠴᠢᠩᠭᠡᠯᠲᠡᠢ	1924–2013	China	"A new approach to the deciphering of the Ch'i-tan Small Script" (1978); Study of the Khitan Small Script (1985); Problems in the readings of the Khitan Small Script (2002)
	Juha Janhunen	b. 1952	Finland	New Materials on the Khitan Small Script: A Critical Edition of Xiao Dilu and Yelü Xiangwen (2010)
	Jishi 即实 (pen name of Batu)	b. 1927	China	A New Approach to the Decipherment of Khitan Small Script (1996); Continuing the Decipherment of Khitan Small Script (2012)
	Daniel Kane	1948–2021	Australia	The Kitan Language and Script (2009)
	Liu Fengzhu 刘凤翥	b. 1934	China	"A new approach to the deciphering of the Ch'i-tan Small Script" (1978); Study of the Khitan Small Script (1985); Collection of Liao dynasty monumental inscriptions from the area of the Liao Upper Capital (2009)
	Vladimir Sergeevich Starikov; Влади́мир Серге́евич Ста́риков	1919–1987	Soviet Union	Catalogue of Graphems of the Kitan Script (1966)
Sun Bojun at the International Tangut Encoding Conference, Beijing, December 2013	Sun Bojun 孫伯君	b. 1966	China	"Study and reading of a stone with a Khitan large script inscription in Khentii Province, Mongolia" (2006)
Wu Yingzhe at an international meeting at Hohhot, September 2017	Wu Yingzhe 吴英喆	b. 1971	China	New Materials on the Khitan Small Script: A Critical Edition of Xiao Dilu and Yelü Xiangwen (2010)
	Viacheslav Petrovich Zaytsev; Вячесла́в Петро́вич За́йцев	b. 1976	Russia	"A Manuscript Codex in the Khitan Large Script from the Collection of the Institute of Oriental Manuscripts, Russian Academy of Sciences" (2011) "Identification of a Khitan historical work as part of the Nova N 176 manuscript codex from the collection of the IOM RAS and related problems" (2015)

== See also ==
- List of sinologists
- List of Tangutologists
