= List of Jurchen inscriptions =

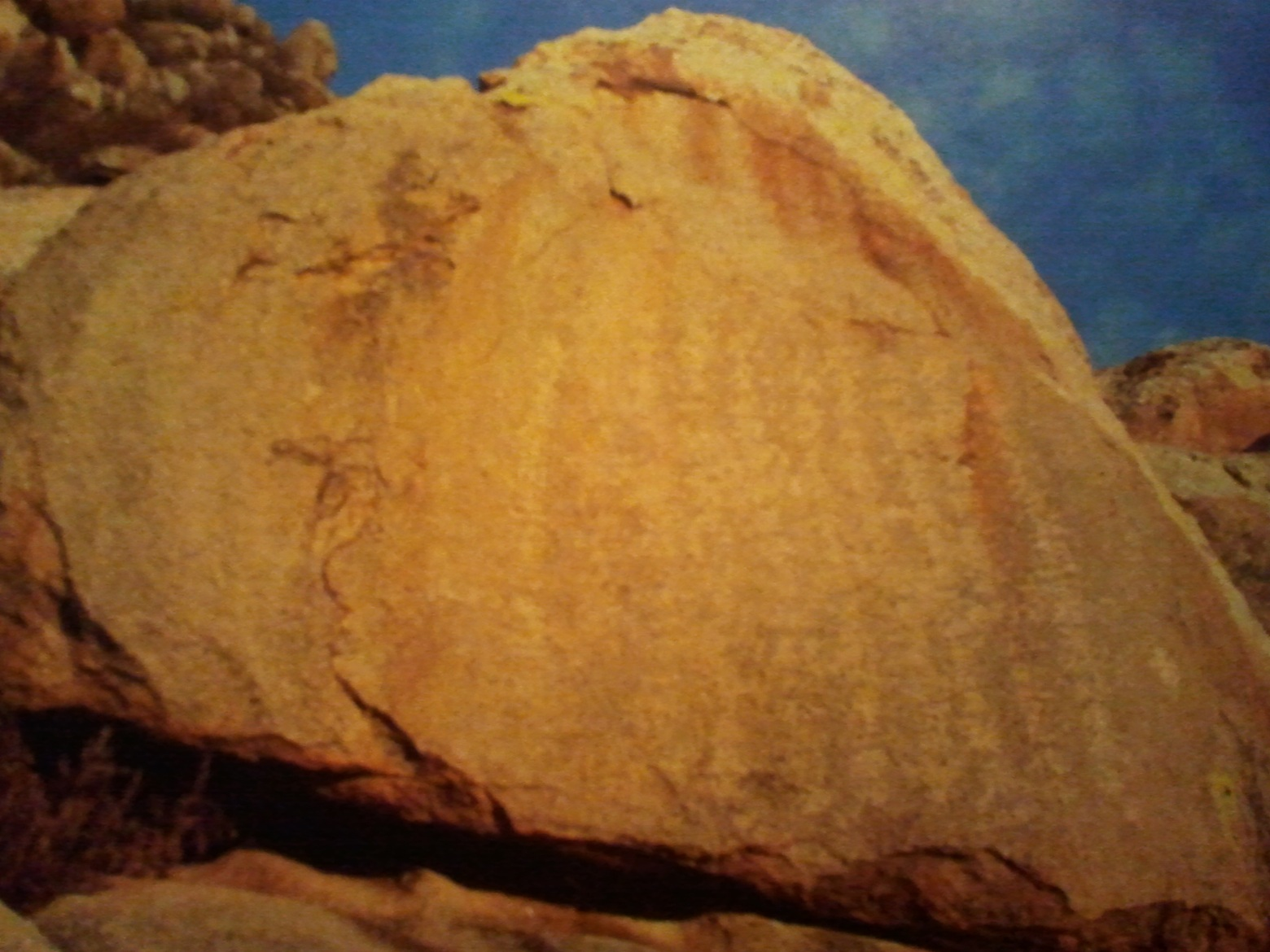
Rock inscription in Jurchen dated 1196 at Serven Khaalga, Bayankhutag, Mongolia. The inscription relates to Genghis Khan's alliance with the Jin against the Tatars.

The list of Jurchen inscriptions comprises a list of the corpus of known inscriptions written in the Jurchen language using the Jurchen script. There are ten monumental inscriptions, mostly dating to the Jin dynasty (1115–1234), but the latest monument dates to the early Ming dynasty (1413). There are also a number of short Jurchen inscriptions on portable artefacts such as mirrors, seals and paiza. In contrast with inscriptions in Khitan scripts, there are no known examples of stone-inscribed epitaphs in the Jurchen script.

== Monumental inscriptions in the Jurchen script ==
Monument	Date	Place of discovery	Year of discovery	Current Location	Description
Monument commemorating the victory of Emperor Taizu of Jin over the Khitans in 1114 (Da-Jin deshengtuo song bei 大金得勝陀頌碑)	1185	Shibei Weizi, Fuyu County; Jilin; 45.346°N 125.612°E	known since about 1820–1850	Jilin Provincial Museum	Bilingual Chinese and Jurchen memorial with 30 lines of Chinese text on the front, and 33 lines of Jurchen text on the back, about 1,500 Jurchen characters in total.
Monument recording the names of successful candidates for the degree of jinshi in 1224 (Nüzhen jinshi timing bei 女真進士題名碑)	1224	Yantaihe 宴台河, Kaifeng; Henan; 34.806°N 114.422°E	known since the early 14th century	Erected at the Confucian Temple (Wen Miao 文廟) in Kaifeng	Originally a bilingual memorial, but the original Chinese text was deleted and re-engraved with a new text commemorating the restoration of the Temple of the River Spirit 河神廟 during the Ming dynasty. The Jurchen text comprises about 1,100 characters.
Monument commemorating a picnic held by Aotun Liangbi (Aotun Liangbi jianyin bei 奧屯良弼餞飲碑)	1210	Unknown (originally in the collection of Luo Zhenyu)	known since 1931	National Museum of China, Beijing	Chinese inscription by Aotun Liangbi 奧屯良弼 in 4 lines, dated 1206, on the front; and a Jurchen inscription in 3 lines (about 60 characters) on the left side, dated 1210, added by Aotun Liangbi's friend Bu Xiuhong 卜修洪.
Monument inscribed with a poem by Aotun Liangbi (Aotun Liangbi shi bei 奧屯良弼詩碑)		Youde Temple 佑德觀, Penglai City; Shandong; 37.832°N 120.753°E	1960s		Eight-line poem with preface by Aotun Liangbi 奧屯良弼, comprising about 170 characters in total. The poem is written in Aotun Liangbi's cursive calligraphy, and was inscribed on the orders of his friend Bu Xiuhong.
Rock inscription at Hailong (Hailong Nüzhen guoshu moya 海龍女真國書摩崖)	1167	Yangshulin Mountain 楊樹林山, Meihekou; Jilin; 42.295°N 125.450°E	known since about 1875–1908	In situ	Jurchen inscription of about 80 characters dated 1167, commemorating the establishment of an office in 1116. A fake Chinese-Jurchen inscription made in about 1934 by Xing Yuren 邢玉人 is also present at this site.
Monument commemorating the construction of a Buddhist temple (Qingyuanjun Nüzhen guoshu bei 慶源郡女真國書碑)	1138 or 1141	Buddhist temple, Kyongwon; North Korea; 42.8°N 130.2°E	1918	Seoul Museum of History	List of names and titles of people who contributed to the construction of the Buddhist temple where the monument was originally found. 22 lines on four sides, but the top of the monument is missing so the inscription is incomplete, with about 500 characters remaining.
Rock inscription commemorating the presentation of a Buddhist statue (Beiqing Nüzhen guoshu moya 北青女真國書摩崖)	1218	Mount Kwansan 串山, Pukchong; North Korea; 40.25°N 128.30°E	1911	In situ	Jurchen inscription comprising about 40 characters.
Yongning Temple Stele; Monument commemorating the foundation of Yongning Temple (Yongningsi bei 永寧寺碑)	1413	Tyr, Khabarovsk Krai; Russia; 52.93°N 139.76°E	known since 1639	Vladivostok Museum	Main inscription in Chinese on the front, and secondary inscriptions (approximate translations of the Chinese) in Mongolian and Jurchen on the back (about 700 Jurchen characters); with the mantra Om mani padme hum written in Chinese, Mongolian, Tibetan and Jurchen on both sides.
Tomb memorial for the Zhaoyong General (Zhaoyong dajiangjun tongzhi Xiongzhou jiedushi mubei 昭勇大將軍同知雄州節度使墓碑)	1186	Xiaocheng, Shulan; Jilin; 44.235°N 127.155°E	1979		1 line of Jurchen text (21 characters).
Rock inscription recording the Jin victory at the Battle of Ulja River in 1196 (Wanyan Xiang jigong moya bei 完顏襄記功摩崖碑)	1196	Bayankhutag, Khentii Province; Mongolia; 47.17°N 110.82°E	1979		9 lines of Jurchen text (about 140 characters), with Chinese translation nearby.
Rock Inscription at Shenmu (Shanbei shiku moya tike 陝北石窟摩崖題刻)	c. 1228 (date on an adjacent Chinese inscription)	Shenmu, near Yulin; Shaanxi; 38.85°N 110.52°E	2014	In situ	Jurchen inscription on a rock face outside a cave, comprising about 30 lines of about 20 characters each, but most of the inscription has been lost due to damage, and only the first four lines are relatively complete. About 200 Jurchen characters survive, which is about a third of the original inscription. Also two Jurchen characters on an adjacent inscription with snake patterns.
Rock Inscription on the bank of the River Arkhara	1127	River Arkhara, Amur Oblast; Russia; 49.63963°N 130.60997°E	2003 (identified as Jurchen in 2014)	In situ	One short inscription (24 characters on 3 lines) written in ink on a rock face.

== Other inscriptions in the Jurchen script ==
Object	Date	Place of discovery	Year of discovery	Current Location	Description
Ink inscriptions on a pagoda		White Pagoda, Hohhot; Inner Mongolia; 40.84°N 111.90°E			Inscriptions in cursive Jurchen written in ink on the inner wall of the 6th storey of the Ten Thousand Copies of the Huayan Sutra Pagoda (Wànbù Huáyánjīng Tǎ 萬部華嚴經塔).
Rock inscriptions		Du'erji, Horqin Right Middle Banner; Inner Mongolia; 45.20°N 121.16°E			
Rock inscriptions		Wulanmaodu, Horqin Right Front Banner; Inner Mongolia; 46.39°N 121.20°E			
Inscription on a sacrificial platform		Heaven Lake, Fusong County; Jilin; 42.025°N 128.055°E			3 Jurchen characters on a Jin dynasty sacrificial platform at the edge of the lake.
Medallion		Unknown		Unknown (only known from a drawing in a Ming dynasty catalogue of molds for making ink)	Medallion with the Jurchen translation of a Chinese couplet, "When a wise king is heedful of virtue, foreigners from all quarters come as guests" (Ming wang shen de, si yi xian bin 明王慎德, 四夷咸賓).
Seal of the head of the Kechenshan 100 households (Kechenshan mouke yin 可陳山謀克印)	1178	Helong, Yanbian; Jilin; 42.55°N 129.00°E	1916		Official seal with Chinese inscription on the seal face, and a Jurchen inscription of 13 characters on the side.
Seal of the head of the Yigaidagehe 100 households (Yigaidagehe mouke yin 移改達葛河謀克印)	1179			Palace Museum, Beijing	Official seal with Chinese inscription on the seal face, and a Jurchen inscription of 7 characters on the side.
Seal of the head of the Hetouhulunhe 100 households (Hetouhulunhe mouke yin 河頭胡論河謀克印)	1176			Tianjin Museum	Official seal with Chinese inscription on the seal face, and a Jurchen inscription of 6 characters on the side.
Seal of the head of the Hezhuohailuan 100 households (Hezhuohailuan mouke yin 和拙海欒謀克印)	1178			Tianjin Museum	Official seal with Chinese inscription on the seal face, and a Jurchen inscription of 8 characters on the side.
Seal of the head of the Jiahunshan 100 households (Jiahunshan mouke yin 夾渾山謀克印)	1178			Palace Museum, Beijing	Official seal with Chinese inscription on the seal face, and a Jurchen inscription of 7 characters on the side.
Seal of the head of the Milidiehe 100 households (Milidiehe mouke yin 迷里迭河謀克印)	1179	Harbin; Heilongjiang; 45.85°N 126.65°E	1986	Harbin Cultural Office	Official seal with Chinese inscription on the seal face, and a Jurchen inscription on the side.
Seal of the head of the Supakunshan 100 households (Supakunshan mouke yin 速怕昆山謀克印)	1222 (Eastern Xia)	Aolimi Ancient City (奥里米古城), Suibin County; Heilongjiang; 47.290°N 131.815°E	1987	Hegang Cultural Relics Office	Official seal with Chinese inscription on the seal face, and a Jurchen inscription on the side.
Bronze mirror (Kouwei meng'an tongjing 叩畏猛安銅鏡)					Song dynasty mirror with a later Jurchen inscription ("head of Kouwei 1,000 households") engraved along the edge.
Bronze mirror		Chengzi He 承紫河, Mishan; Heilongjiang; 45.44°N 132.37°E	1974		Mirror with a 9 character Jurchen inscription engraved along the edge.
Silver paiza		Shaygino, Primorsky Krai; Russia; 43.33°N 133.00°E	1976		Silver pass with a Jurchen inscription in five characters reading gurun ni xada-xun meaning "Trust of the Country".

== See also ==
- List of Khitan inscriptions
