= Nova N 176 =

Undeciphered manuscript codex written in the Mongolian Khitan large script

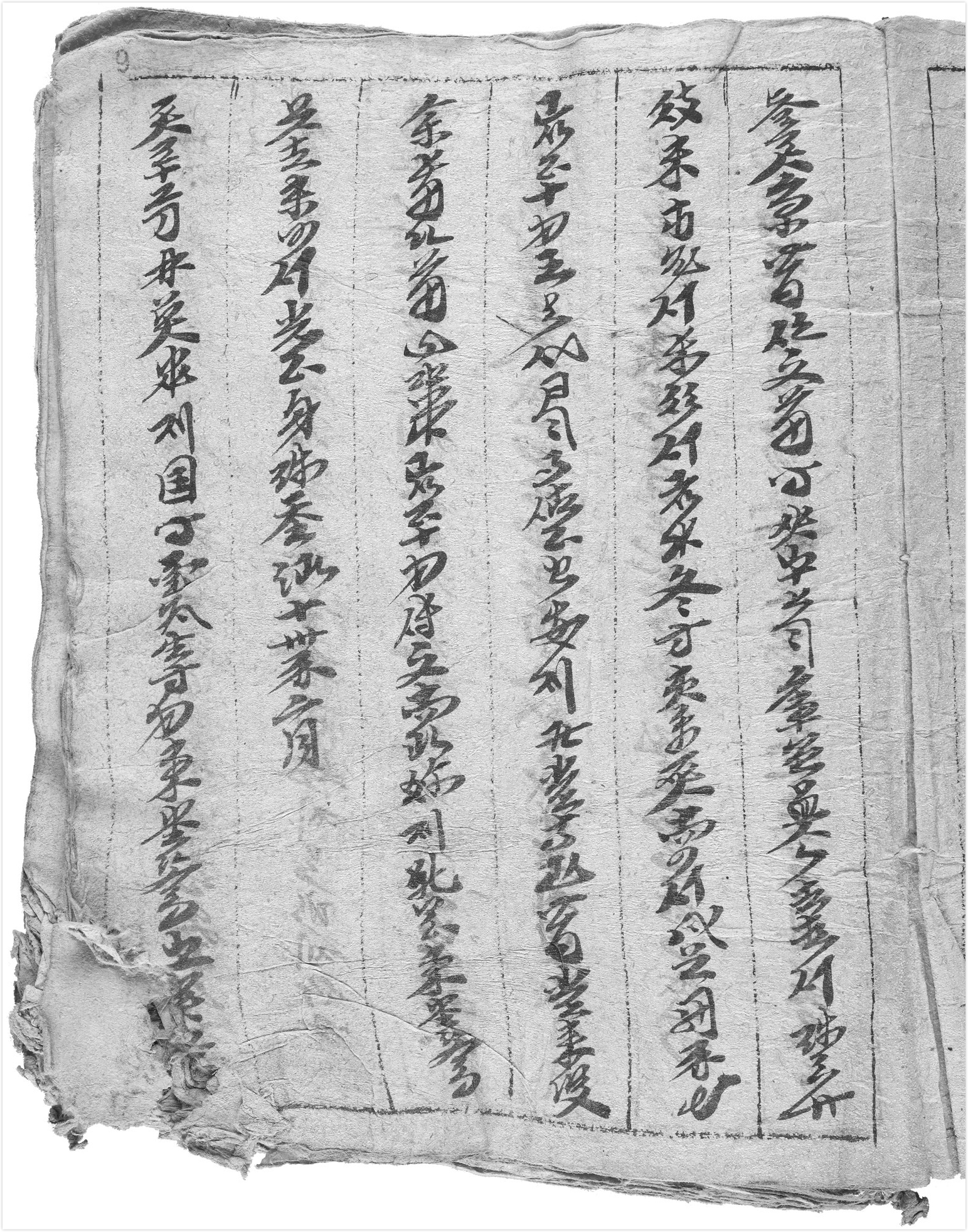
Folio 9 of manuscript codex Nova N 176

Nova N 176 is an undeciphered manuscript codex held at the Institute of Oriental Manuscripts (IOM) of the Russian Academy of Sciences in Saint Petersburg, Russia. The manuscript, of uncertain provenance, entered the collection of the IOM in 1954, and for more than fifty years nobody was able to identify with certainty what language or script the text of the manuscript was written in. It was only in 2010 that IOM researcher Viacheslav Zaytsev was able to demonstrate that the manuscript is written in the Khitan large script, one of two largely undeciphered writing systems used for the now-extinct Khitan language during the 10th–12th centuries by the Khitan people, who founded the Liao Empire in north-eastern China.

== Description ==
The manuscript is stored in the Nova fonds of Chinese manuscripts in the IOM (call number N 176 (Note: In Russian, фонд «Nova», шифр Н 176.), inventory number 1055), and comprises nine quires sewn together, one loose quire, and seven loose folios, in total 63½ folios (127 leaves), together with a piece of cloth cover with Khitan characters on it. (Note: With a few exceptions, the back of each folio in the manuscript is blank. Each quire consists of six folios, arranged into three pairs with the blank sides of adjacent folios facing each other. The leaves of the codex have been numbered sequentially by the IOM, but only the front page of most leaves has any text.) The codex is enclosed in a brown leather binding of an Islamic type, which may or may not be the original binding.

- Quire 1: 6 folios (leaves 1–12).
- Quire 2: 6 folios (leaves 13–24).
- Quire 3: 6 folios (leaves 25–36).
- Quire 4: 5 folios (leaves 37–46).
- Quire 5: 6 folios (leaves 47–58).
- Quire 6: 6 folios (leaves 59–70).
- Quire 7: 5 folios (leaves 71–80).
- Quire 8: 6 folios (leaves 81–92).
- Quire 9: 6 folios (leaves 93–104).
- Loose quire: 4½ folios (leaves 105–113). Missing one leaf between leaves 112 and 113.
- 7 loose folios (14 leaves, separately numbered).

Each page of the manuscript has six ruled columns of text, each column comprising between 17 and 26 characters written in ink in cursive handwriting. Most of the manuscript appears to be written in a single hand.

== History ==
The earliest known location for the manuscript was the Institute of Language, Literature and History of the Kyrgyz Branch of the Soviet Academy of Sciences. At some unknown date (1954 or earlier) the manuscript was sent from the institute in Kyrgyzstan to the Institute of Oriental Studies (IOS) in Moscow for identification and decipherment, and in November 1954, it was sent from Moscow to the Department of Oriental Manuscripts of the IOS (later the Institute of Oriental Manuscripts) in Leningrad, where it has remained ever since.

It is unknown where exactly the manuscript was found, but Kyrgyzstan is within the area of the Kara-Khitan Khanate (also known as the Western Liao), founded by Khitans after the overthrow of the Liao Empire by the Jurchens, and so Zaytsev suggests that the book probably came from a Western Liao site. Furthermore, as the Khitan script was still used by the Kara-Khitans the book may have been written during the Western Liao (1124–1218) period rather than being a relic of the Liao dynasty brought west with the fleeing Khitans. Zaytsev notes the possibility that the book may have been discovered during excavations of the Silk Road city of Suyab (modern day Ak-Beshim in Kyrgyzstan) during 1953–1954.

The manuscript was catalogued in the IOM collection as a manuscript written in the Jurchen language, and the general consensus of those few scholars who were able to examine it was that it was probably written in the Jurchen script. Despite the probable importance of this manuscript, no research on it was published until 2010, when Zaytsev presented his initial findings on the language and script of the manuscript to the annual scientific session of the IOM.

== Content ==
In 2015 Zaytsev proposed that the manuscript comprises eight texts by multiple scribes, the largest of which is an historical text calling itself a “record of Khagans of the Great Central *hulʤi Khitan State.” He identifies this with a lost Liao text mentioned in Chinese records. At present the manuscript is mostly undeciphered and the content of the other texts is unknown. There are significant differences in vocabulary between the manuscript and known memorial inscriptions.

== Decipherment ==
Reading the manuscript is a great challenge, as not only is the Khitan large script largely undeciphered, but the manuscript text is written in a previously unattested cursive style of writing which makes it difficult to match the characters as written in the manuscript with the forms of characters as written on monumental inscriptions. To date, only some individual Khitan characters (e.g. "state" and "emperor") and two short stretches of text that correspond to text found on monumental inscriptions in the Khitan large script have been identified and read. Zaytsev identified eight characters at the end of the 5th column of leaf 9 as meaning the date "Chongxi 14th year 2nd month", and seven characters at the start of the 6th column of the same leaf as meaning "Great Central [?] Khitan State". (Note: The exact meaning and pronunciation of the Khitan word corresponding to the 4th and 5th characters are unknown. Daniel Kane summarises the theories of various scholars that the corresponding two characters in the Khitan small script could mean *hulus "state", *hala ~ *kara "black", "hus" "strong", or be the unknown Khitan word for Liao. He transcribes the Khitan small script equivalent of this text as ⟨GREAT t.iau.dû xu.rả qid.i gúr⟩. Aisin-Gioro Ulhicun suggests that the Khitan word here is *hulʤi, cognate with Mongolian ulus (улус) "state, people".) The characters meaning "Great Central [?] Khitan State" are exactly the same as the first seven characters on the Memorial for the Princess of Yongning Commandery (Chinese 永寧郡公主), dated 1087. The era name Chongxi is attested on various Khitan large script memorial stones, and the 14th year of the Chongxi era is the 15th year of the reign of Emperor Xingzong of Liao, corresponding to the year 1045, indicating the manuscript cannot have been written any earlier than 1045.

Top line: Khitan text meaning "Chongxi 14th year 2nd month" Bottom line: Corresponding Chinese translation (重熙十四年二月)

Top line: Khitan text meaning "Great Central [?] Khitan State" Bottom line: Corresponding Chinese translation (大中央□□契丹國)

== Significance ==
A relatively large number of memorial inscriptions written in both the Khitan large script and the Khitan small script are known, but there are no surviving printed books in either Khitan script, and no Chinese glossaries of the Khitan language. Until recently, the only known examples of Khitan text not inscribed on stone or portable artifacts were five Khitan large script characters recorded by Wang Yi (王易), who was sent as an envoy to the Khitans in 1058, and which are reproduced in Tao Zongyi's 1376 Important Matters in the History of Calligraphy. In 2002 a small fragment of a Khitan manuscript with seven Khitan large characters and interlinear glosses in Old Uyghur was identified in the collection of the Berlin-Brandenburg Academy of Sciences and Humanities. Nova N 176 is therefore the only known example of a full-length manuscript text written in the Khitan language (in either of the two Khitan scripts) to have survived to the present day.

Not only is this the only complete Khitan manuscript text to have been discovered, but it is by far the longest example of any text written in the Khitan large script; indeed, its estimated length of approximately 15,000 characters (20 characters × 6 columns × 127 pages) is equivalent to that of the entire corpus of known monumental inscriptions written in the Khitan large script (given as 15,000 characters by Wu & Janhunen).

== See also ==
- List of Khitan inscriptions
