= B. Burinbeki =

B. Burinbeki (February 26, 1928 - October 11, 2009) was a modern Mongol poet. He was born to a poor family in Baarin Right Banner, Joo Oda League, Inner Mongolia, and only received several years of basic education. His mother was a folk singer. In 1948 he attended the Communist movement, and entered the Jinchareliao Union University to study literature and art in the same year. Burinbeki mainly writes in Mongolian. His poetry collections published include Hello Spring, Gold season, Fireworks of life, Phoenix, Fountain and Poems of Ba Burinbeki. He also wrote several poetry criticism books such as Notes of a poet seeking heartfelt wishes, Mongolian Poetry Aesthetics, Poetics of Mongolian epic and so on.
