= Khitan scripts =

Khitan scripts may refer to one of two mutually exclusive scripts used by the Khitan people during the 10th–12th centuries:

- Khitan small script, invented in about 924 or 925 CE by a scholar named Diela
- Khitan large script, introduced in 920 CE by Abaoji, founder of the Liao Dynasty

== See also ==
- Khitan (disambiguation)
- List of Khitan inscriptions
