= Khitan =

Khitan or Khitai may refer to:

- Khitan (circumcision), the Islamic circumcision rite
- Khitan people, an ancient nomadic people located in Mongolia and northern China
- Liao dynasty (916–1125), a dynasty of China ruled by the Khitan Yelü clan
  - Northern Liao (1122–1123), a regime in northern China
  - Qara Khitai (1124–1218), alternatively called the "Western Liao", successor to the Liao dynasty in northwestern China and Central Asia
  - Eastern Liao (1213–1269), a regime in northeastern China
  - Later Liao (1216–1219), a regime in northeastern China
- Khitan language, a now-extinct language once spoken by the Khitan people
- Khitan scripts, writing systems of the Khitan people, for the now-extinct Khitan language
  - Khitan large script, a logographic writing system
  - Khitan small script, a semi-syllabic and logographic writing system
- Cathay in many languages
