= Memorial for Yelü Yanning =

Khitan memorial

Coordinates: 41.63°N 120.20°E

The Memorial for Yelü Yanning (耶律延寧), also known as the Epitaph for Yelü Yanning, is the oldest known Khitan inscription of significant length and currently the oldest major written attestation of a Mongolic (or Para-Mongolic) language. Dated 986, it is inscribed with 19 lines (271 characters) of Khitan large script. It was found in the winter of 1964 on Baimu Mountain in northwest Baishugou Village, Xiwujiazi Township, Chaoyang County, Liaoning Province, China and is now kept in the Liaoning Provincial Museum.

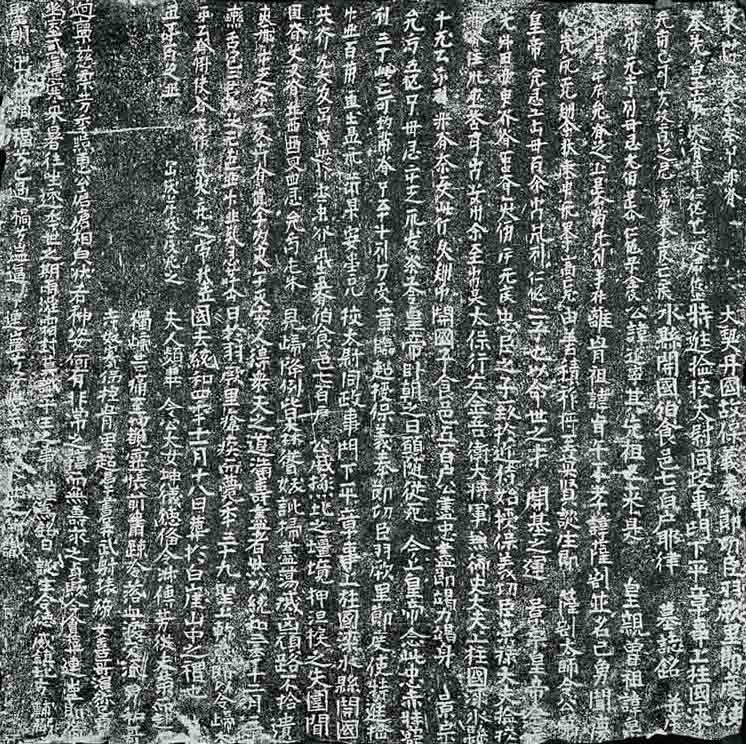
Memorial for Yelü Yanning in Khitan large script. Dated 986.

The Khitan word ⟨jau⟩ ("hundred") which occurs in line 13 of the upper-right Khitan section of the inscription and which is written with the large script character 百 is one of the earliest fully deciphered Mongolic words preserved in a Mongolic inscription.

== Yelü Yanning ==
Duke Yelü Yanning (947-986) is not mentioned directly in the Liaoshi or other Khitan historical documents. The discovery of his memorial inscription in 1964 gave the first information about him. Yelü Yanning was a high ranking Khitan military officer of the Liao dynasty. Yelü Yanning's family belonged to the imperial household and had a place in the horizontal gers of the Khitan Khan. His great-grandfather Nieligu 臬離骨 (*Niargu), (Note: 臬離骨 is also the Chinese transcription of the Khitan female personal name Niargun. Substantives or substantive-derived adjectival names have an -n/-ȵ ending in Khitan epitaphs when used as female personal names or male courtesy names, but lose this ending as male personal names. As Nieligu here is a male personal name (諱 huì, the (possibly taboo) name of a deceased elder), the Khitan form is *Niargu.) grandfather Zhiwubu [⿱止日]午不 and his father Sage 薩割 were all widely known as brave and expert warriors who repeatedly accomplished meritorious deeds. His father Sage was given the title of "imperial tutor honorable duke" 太師令公. When the Jingzong Emperor Yelü Xian succeeded to the throne, Yelü Yanning was recruited as a jinshi 近侍 (palace attendant). Yelü Yanning was gradually given the titles of "righteousness-defending outstanding minister" 保義功臣, "sublime fortunate minister" 崇祿大夫, "acting grand protector" 檢校太保, "senior general of the left imperial insignia guard" 左金吾衛大將軍, and "imperial censor in chief" 御史大夫. He was granted a fief of 500 families in Qishui County, having been dubbed its "high pillar of state and dynasty-founding viscount" 上柱國漆水縣開國子.

Yanning scrupulously performed his guard duties, always ensuring the Emperor's safety and earning the deep trust of the Jingzong Emperor and Empress Xiao Chuo. When the Jingzong Emperor died in 982, Yanning "wished he could follow him in death". After the Jingzong Emperor's death, Empress Xiao was regent. In view of his immense loyalty, she went even further in granting Yanning the titles of "righteousness-defending outstanding minister of Fengjie" 保義奉節功臣, "jiedushi (military governor) of Yujueli" 羽厥里節度使, "specially promoted acting grand marshal" 特進檢校太尉, and "honorary chancellor" 同政事門下平章事. He was granted a fief of 700 families as "high pillar of state and dynasty-founding earl" of Qishui County 上柱國漆水縣開國伯.

During this time the Zubu confederacy (Keraites) in central Mongolia raised armies against the Liao dynasty and pushed eastwards, profoundly affecting the Niaogu, Dilie, Shiwei (Mongols) and others. Emperor Shengzong Yelü Longxu and Empress Xiao sent Yelü Yanning to pacify the northern borderland. Yelü Yanning reached the area of present-day Hulunbuir in Inner Mongolia near the source of the Heilongjiang river and continued to the Kherlen River in present-day eastern Mongolia where he met with success. He died on the 30th day of the 12th month of the third year of the Tonghe period (11 February 986) due to complications from his wounds. He was 39 years old.

== Inscription ==
The memorial stone is 84 cm long and 83 cm wide. The Khitan large script section comprises 19 lines (271 characters) on the upper half of the stone, and the Chinese section comprises 24 lines (511 characters) on the lower half, with 3 of those lines taking up the entire vertical length at the left margin. The two texts are not bilingual translations of each other. The date of composition is given as the 18th day of the 11th month of the fourth year of Tonghe (21 December 986). There is no author name given, at least in the Chinese version, implying that the author might have been of low status and merely part of the deceased's retinue. A rubbing of the epitaph was first published in Wenwu 文物: Cultural Relics, issue 7, in 1980.

Nearly all the identifiable dates and titles come from the Chinese portion of the epitaph. The preface introduces Yelü Yanning with the much higher-status titles and achievements granted to him after Emperor Jingzong's death by the then-"present emperor"; this would have been Emperor Shengzong or, more likely, the Empress Dowager Chengtian (former Empress Xiao), who was de facto ruler due to Shengzong's young age.

Interpretation of the Khitan text is rather sparse and only a few phrases, words and morphological suffixes have been identified. Most of these are also borrowings from Chinese, generally semantic and phonetic but sometimes graphemic. The first four characters in line 2, [⿻⿽丿㇄⿱一⺄]皇帝 [then □ ɣuɑŋ ti], were identified in the 1990s as referring to the Tianzan Emperor 天贊皇帝 (likely Jingzong, who reigned 948-982). Later, the gloss for the second character was rescinded in a 2014 work, leaving its status uncertain. Lines 4-5 contain the phrase 金[⿰亻⿻㇋㇏]太将[⿱口⿻⿱一八㇉]午 [□ □ tɑi siɑŋ kun ir], glossed as 金吾大將軍號 jinwu dajiangjun hao "the title of senior general of the imperial insignia", probably corresponding to 左金吾衛大將軍 zuo jinwuwei dajiangjun "senior general of the left imperial insignia guard" in line 9 of the Chinese. In line 9, the first four characters mean 父母之子 "child of the father and mother". In line 13, characters 9-10 [⿱䒑卬][⿱日朩] [setu ʃi] transcribe 節度使 jiedushi "military governor". From lines 1 and 12 of the Chinese, Yanning is described as the jiedushi of Yujueli; he eventually died there. There are other assorted characters, such as "northwest", "five", "hundred" and "state."

== See also ==
- List of Khitan inscriptions
- Khitan large script
