= Jurchen language =

Tungusic language of eastern Manchuria

Jurchen
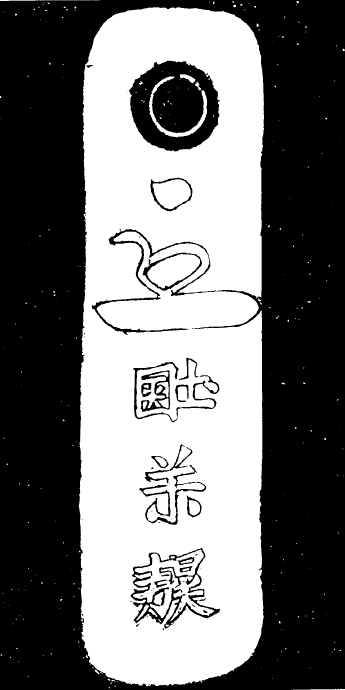
- A silver pass with the Jurchen inscription gurun ni xada-xun, meaning "Trust of the Country"
- Region: Southwest Manchuria (Northeastern China)
- Ethnicity: Jurchen
- Era: developed into Manchu and Xibe c. 17th century
- Language family: Tungusic: Southern; Jurchenic; Jurchen
- Writing system: Jurchen script

Language codes
- ISO 639-3: juc
- Glottolog: jurc1239
- Linguasphere: 44-CAA-cc

The Jurchen language (Chinese: 女真語; pinyin: Nǚzhēn yǔ) was the Tungusic language of the Jurchen people of eastern Manchuria, the rulers of the Jin dynasty in northern China of the 12th and 13th centuries. It is ancestral to the Manchu language. In 1635, Hong Taiji renamed the Jurchen ethnicity and language to "Manchu".

== Writing ==
A writing system for Jurchen language was developed in 1119 by Wanyan Xiyin. A number of books were translated into Jurchen, but none have survived, even in fragments. Surviving samples of Jurchen writing are quite scarce.

One of the most important extant texts in Jurchen is the inscription on the back of "the Jin Victory Memorial Stele" (大金得勝陀頌碑; Dà jīn déshèngtuó sòngbēi), which was erected in 1185, during the reign of Emperor Shizong. It is apparently an abbreviated translation of the Chinese text on the front of the stele.

A number of other Jurchen inscriptions exist as well. For example, in the 1950s a tablet was found in Penglai, Shandong, containing a poem in Jurchen by a poet called (in Chinese transcription) Aotun Liangbi. Although written in Jurchen, the poem was composed using the Chinese "regulated verse" format known as qiyan lüshi. It is speculated that the choice of this format—rather than something closer to the Jurchen folk poetry—was due to the influence of the Chinese literature on the educated class of the Jurchens.

== Ming dynasty Jurchen dictionaries ==
The two most extensive resources on the Jurchen language available to today's linguists are two dictionaries created during the Ming dynasty by the Chinese government's Bureau of Translators (Siyi Guan) and the Bureau of Interpreters (會同館; Huìtóng Guǎn). Both dictionaries were found as sections of the manuscripts prepared by those two agencies, whose job was to help the imperial government to communicate with foreign nations or ethnic minorities, in writing or orally, respectively.

Although the Bureau of Translators' multilingual dictionary (華夷譯語; Huá-Yí yìyǔ; 'Sino-Barbarian Dictionary') was known to Europeans since 1789 (thanks to Jean Joseph Marie Amiot), a copy of the Huá-Yí yìyǔ with a Jurchen section was not discovered until the late 19th century, when it was studied and published by Wilhelm Grube in 1896. Soon research continued in Japan and China as well. It was this dictionary which first made serious study of the Jurchen language possible. This dictionary contained translation of Chinese words into Jurchen, given in Jurchen characters and in phonetic transcription into Chinese characters (rather imprecise, since the transcription was done by means of Chinese characters).

The vocabulary lists compiled by the Bureau of Interpreters became first known to the Western scholars in 1910, and in 1912 L. Aurousseau reported the existence of a manuscript of it with a Jurchen section, supplied to him by Yang Shoujing. This dictionary is similar in its structure to the one from the Bureau of Translators, but it only gives the "phonetic" transcription of Jurchen words (by means of Chinese characters) and not their writing in Jurchen script. The time of its creation is not certain; various scholars thought that it could have been created as late as c. 1601 (by Mao Ruicheng) or as early as 1450–1500; Daniel Kane's analysis of the dictionary, published in 1989, surmises that it may have been written in the first half of the 16th century, based on the way the Jurchen words are transcribed into Chinese.

Both dictionaries record very similar forms of the language, which can be considered a late form of Jurchen, or an early form of Manchu.

According to modern researchers, both dictionaries were compiled by the two Bureaus' staff, who were not very competent in Jurchen. The compilers of the two dictionaries were apparently not very familiar with Jurchen grammar. The language, in Daniel Kane's words, was geared to basic communications "with 'barbarians', when this was absolutely inevitable, or when they brought tribute to the Court".

== Jurchen words in Chinese texts ==
Besides the inscriptions and one or two surviving manuscripts in Jurchen script, some important information on the Jurchen language is provided by the Jurchen words, transcribed using Chinese characters in Chinese documents. These include:

- The list of 125 Jurchen words in Jin Guoyu Jie ("Explanation of the national language of the Jin" 金國語解), an appendix to the History of Jin. Alexander Wylie translated the list into English and Manchu.
- Jurchen names and words throughout the History of Jin.
- An appendix with Jurchen words in Da Jin guozhi ("The veritable annals of the Jin dynasty"), the text prepared in 1234 by Yuwen Mouzhao.

Researches on Manchu Origins contained a list of corrections of transcribed Jurchen language words found in the History of Jin in Chapter 135 – 金史/卷135, using the Manchu language to correct them, in Chapter 18 – 滿洲源流考/卷18.

The Jin dynasty referred to the Jurchen language with the term Guoyu ("National language"), which was also used by other non-Han dynasties in China to refer to their languages, like the Manchu language during the Qing dynasty, the Mongolian language during the Yuan dynasty, the Khitan language during the Liao dynasty, and the Xianbei language during the Northern Wei.

== Writing Jurchen names in English ==
Due to the scarcity of surviving Jurchen-language inscriptions, the overwhelming majority of primary documentary sources on the Jurchen people available to modern scholars are in Chinese. Therefore, when names of Jurchens, or Jurchen terms, are written in English, the same writing convention is usually followed as for Chinese words, that is, the English spelling is simply the Romanization (Pinyin or Wade–Giles, as the case may be) of the Modern Standard Mandarin pronunciation of the Chinese characters that were used to render the Jurchen name or word. This standard presentation does not attempt to reconstruct the original Jurchen pronunciation of the word, or even the 12th-century Chinese pronunciation of the Chinese characters (even though more-or-less hypothetical Middle Chinese pronunciation of Chinese characters can be looked up in specialized dictionaries and databases, and reconstructing pronunciation of some Jurchen words is attempted by some authors as well). Thus, for example, the Jurchen name of the first Jin emperor is written in Chinese as 完顏阿骨打, and appears in English scholarship as Wanyan Aguda (using Pinyin) or Wan-yen A-ku-ta (using the Wade–Giles system).

== Bibliography ==
- Herbert Franke, Denis Twitchett, Alien Regimes and Border States, 907–1368. The Cambridge History of China, vol 6. Cambridge University Press, 1994. ISBN 0-521-24331-9. Partial text on Google Books
- Wilhelm Grube, Die Sprache und Schrift der Jučen. Leipzig: Otto Harrassowitz, 1896.
- Daniel Kane, The Sino-Jurchen Vocabulary of the Bureau of Interpreters. (Uralic and Altaic Series, Vol. 153). Indiana University, Research Institute for Inner Asian Studies. Bloomington, Indiana, 1989. ISBN 0-933070-23-3.
- Gisaburo N. Kiyose, A Study of the Jurchen Language and Script: Reconstruction and Decipherment. Kyoto: Horitsubunka-sha, 1977. ISBN 4-589-00794-0.
