= Bairin Right Banner =

Bairin Right Banner 巴林右旗 • ᠪᠠᠭᠠᠷᠢᠨ ᠪᠠᠷᠠᠭᠤᠨ ᠬᠣᠰᠢᠭᠤ
- Banner
- Location in Inner Mongolia Bairin Right (China)
- Coordinates: 43°32′N 118°40′E
- Country: China
- Autonomous region: Inner Mongolia
- Prefecture-level city: Chifeng
- Banner seat: Daban

Area
  - Total: 10,240 km^{2} (3,950 sq mi)
- Elevation: 633 m (2,077 ft)

Population (2020)
  - Total: 155,027
  - Density: 15.14/km^{2} (39.21/sq mi)
- Time zone: UTC+8 (China Standard)
- Website: www.blyq.gov.cn

Bairin Right Banner

Chinese name
- Chinese: 巴林右旗
Transcriptions
Standard Mandarin
- Hanyu Pinyin: Bālín Yòu Qí

Mongolian name
- Mongolian Cyrillic: Бааарин баруун хошуу
- Mongolian script: ᠪᠠᠭᠠᠷᠢᠨ ᠪᠠᠷᠠᠭᠤᠨ ᠬᠣᠰᠢᠭᠤ
Transcriptions
- SASM/GNC: Baɣarin Baraɣun qosiɣu

Bairin Right Banner (Mongolian: ᠪᠠᠭᠠᠷᠢᠨ ᠪᠠᠷᠠᠭᠤᠨ ᠬᠣᠰᠢᠭᠤ; Chinese: 巴林右旗) is a banner of eastern Inner Mongolia, China. It is under the administration of Chifeng City, 143 kilometres (89 mi) to the south-southeast. Baarin Mongols live here. The distinct Mongolian dialect of this region is Baarin Mongolian.

== Demographics ==
The proportion of nationalities in Bairin Right Banner (2020)
Nationality	Percentage
Han	51.4%
Mongols	46.6%
Manchus	1.5%
Hui people	0.3%
Koreans	0.1%
Others	0.1%
Source of the population statistics :

== Administrative divisions ==
Bairin Right Banner is made up of 2 subdistricts, 5 towns, and 4 sums.

Name	Simplified Chinese	Hanyu Pinyin	Mongolian (Hudum Script)	Mongolian (Cyrillic)	Administrative division code
Subdistricts
Saihan Subdistrict	赛罕街道	Sàihǎn Jiēdào	ᠰᠠᠢᠬᠠᠨ ᠵᠡᠭᠡᠯᠢ ᠭᠤᠳᠤᠮᠵᠢ	Сайхан зээл гудамж	150423401
Darhan Subdistrict	达尔罕街道	Dá'ěrhǎn Jiēdào	ᠳᠠᠷᠬᠠᠨ ᠵᠡᠭᠡᠯᠢ ᠭᠤᠳᠤᠮᠵᠢ	Дархан зээл гудамж	150423402
Towns
Daban Town	大板镇	Dàbǎn Zhèn	ᠳ᠋ᠠᠪᠠᠨ ᠪᠠᠯᠭᠠᠰᠤ	Таван балгас	150423100
Subrag Town	索博日嘎镇	Suǒbórìgā Zhèn	ᠰᠤᠪᠤᠷᠠᠭ᠎ᠠ ᠪᠠᠯᠭᠠᠰᠤ	Сувраа балгас	150423101
Bor Us Town	宝日勿苏镇	Bǎorìwùsū Zhèn	ᠪᠣᠷᠣᠤ᠋ᠰᠤ ᠪᠠᠯᠭᠠᠰᠤ	Буруус балгас	150423102
Qagan Nur Town	查干诺尔镇	Chágànnuò'ěr Zhèn	ᠴᠠᠭᠠᠨᠨᠠᠭᠤᠷ ᠪᠠᠯᠭᠠᠰᠤ	Цагааннуур балгас	150423103
Bayan Huxu Town	巴彦琥硕镇	Bāyànhǔshuò Zhèn	ᠪᠠᠶᠠᠨᠬᠤᠰᠢᠭᠤ ᠪᠠᠯᠭᠠᠰᠤ	Баянхошуу балгас	150423105
Sums
Xar Moron Sum	西拉沐沦苏木	Xīlāmùlún Sūmù	ᠰᠢᠷᠠᠮᠥ᠋ᠷᠡᠨ ᠰᠤᠮᠤ	Ширмран сум	150423200
Bayan Tal Sum	巴彦塔拉苏木	Bāyàntǎlā Sūmù	ᠪᠠᠶᠠᠨᠲᠠᠯ᠎ᠠ ᠰᠤᠮᠤ	Баянтал сум	150423201
Jargaliin Jam Sum (Xingfuzhilu Sum)	幸福之路苏木	Xìngfúzhīlù Sūmù	ᠵᠢᠷᠭᠠᠯ ᠤᠨ ᠵᠠᠮ ᠰᠤᠮᠤ	Жаргалын зам сум	150423202
Qagan Moron Sum	查干沐沦苏木	Chágànmùlún Sūmù	ᠴᠠᠭᠠᠨᠮᠥ᠋ᠷᠡᠨ ᠰᠤᠮᠤ	Цаанамран сум	150423203

- Other: Daban Coal Electrochemical Base (大板煤电化基地)

== Climate ==
Climate data for Bairin Right Banner, elevation 689 m (2,260 ft), (1991–2020 normals, extremes 1981–2010)
Month	Jan	Feb	Mar	Apr	May	Jun	Jul	Aug	Sep	Oct	Nov	Dec	Year
Record high °C (°F)	7.9 (46.2)	18.7 (65.7)	26.6 (79.9)	32.3 (90.1)	38.0 (100.4)	41.2 (106.2)	42.1 (107.8)	38.7 (101.7)	35.7 (96.3)	30.1 (86.2)	23.8 (74.8)	12.8 (55.0)	42.1 (107.8)
Mean daily maximum °C (°F)	−6.2 (20.8)	−1.6 (29.1)	5.8 (42.4)	15.6 (60.1)	23.1 (73.6)	27.2 (81.0)	29.2 (84.6)	27.9 (82.2)	22.9 (73.2)	14.3 (57.7)	2.9 (37.2)	−4.9 (23.2)	13.0 (55.4)
Daily mean °C (°F)	−12.7 (9.1)	−8.9 (16.0)	−1.3 (29.7)	8.3 (46.9)	16.0 (60.8)	20.7 (69.3)	23.2 (73.8)	21.3 (70.3)	15.2 (59.4)	6.7 (44.1)	−3.8 (25.2)	−11.2 (11.8)	6.1 (43.0)
Mean daily minimum °C (°F)	−17.7 (0.1)	−14.8 (5.4)	−7.9 (17.8)	1.1 (34.0)	8.7 (47.7)	14.2 (57.6)	17.6 (63.7)	15.3 (59.5)	8.4 (47.1)	0.4 (32.7)	−9.1 (15.6)	−16.0 (3.2)	0.0 (32.0)
Record low °C (°F)	−32.3 (−26.1)	−30.0 (−22.0)	−25.2 (−13.4)	−11.0 (12.2)	−4.6 (23.7)	1.5 (34.7)	7.4 (45.3)	6.3 (43.3)	−3.7 (25.3)	−13.5 (7.7)	−27.3 (−17.1)	−29.0 (−20.2)	−32.3 (−26.1)
Average precipitation mm (inches)	1.2 (0.05)	2.5 (0.10)	5.3 (0.21)	12.9 (0.51)	33.5 (1.32)	74.7 (2.94)	112.1 (4.41)	75.0 (2.95)	31.0 (1.22)	14.9 (0.59)	6.1 (0.24)	1.9 (0.07)	371.1 (14.61)
Average precipitation days (≥ 0.1 mm)	1.5	1.9	2.9	4.0	7.4	11.6	13.0	10.2	7.3	4.4	2.2	1.7	68.1
Average snowy days	2.2	2.5	4.0	2.2	0.3	0	0	0	0	1.8	3.0	2.8	18.8
Average relative humidity (%)	48	44	39	35	38	54	64	65	56	48	50	51	49
Mean monthly sunshine hours	216.5	224.3	268.9	266.2	290.0	268.7	268.5	274.7	257.5	247.1	203.3	201.0	2,986.7
Percentage possible sunshine	74	75	72	66	64	58	58	64	70	73	71	73	68
Source: China Meteorological Administration
