= Khitan large script =

Chinese-based script for Khitan language

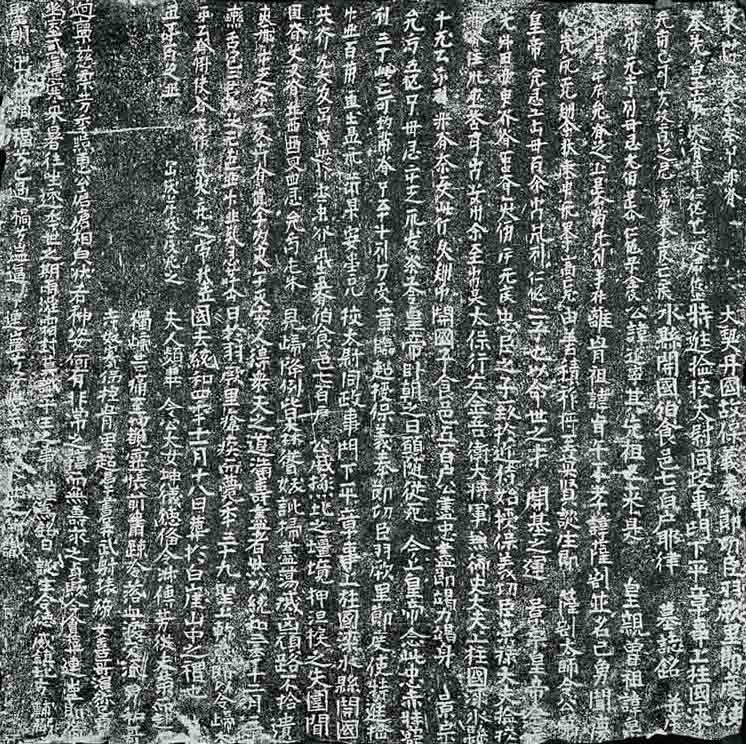
- Memorial for Yelü Yanning dated 986
- Script type: Logographic
- Direction: Top-to-bottom and right-to-left
- Languages: Khitan language

Related scripts
- Parent systems: Oracle bone script: Seal script; Clerical script; Khitan large script
- Child systems: Jurchen script
- Sister systems: Simplified Chinese, Tangut script, Kanji, Hanja, Chữ Hán, Zhuyin

ISO 15924
- ISO 15924: Kitl (505), Khitan large script

The Khitan large script (Chinese: 契丹大字, Qìdān dàzì) was one of two writing systems used for the now-extinct Khitan language (the other was the Khitan small script). It was used during the 10th–12th centuries by the Khitan people, who had created the Liao Empire in north-eastern China. In addition to the large script, the Khitans simultaneously also used a functionally independent writing system known as the Khitan small script. Both Khitan scripts continued to be in use to some extent by the Jurchen people for several decades after the fall of the Liao dynasty, until the Jurchens fully switched to a script of their own. Examples of the scripts appeared most often on epitaphs and monuments, although other fragments sometimes surface.

== History ==
Abaoji of the Yelü clan, founder of the Khitan, or Liao, dynasty, introduced the original Khitan script in 920 CE. The "large script", or "big characters" (大字), as it was referred to in some Chinese sources, was established to keep the record of the new Khitan state. The Khitan script was based on the idea of the Chinese script.

== Description ==
The Khitan large script was considered to be relatively simple. The large script characters were written equally spaced, in vertical columns, in the same way as the Chinese has been traditionally written. Although the large script mostly uses logograms, it is possible that ideograms and syllabograms are used for grammatical functions. The large script has a few similarities to Chinese, with several words taken directly with or without modifications from the Chinese (e.g. characters 二, 三, 十, 廿, 月, and 日, which appear in dates in the apparently bilingual Xiao Xiaozhong muzhi inscription from Xigushan, Jinxi, Liaoning Province). Most large script characters, however, cannot be directly related to any Chinese characters. The meaning of most of them remains unknown, but that of a few of them (numbers, symbols for some of the five elements and the twelve animals that the Khitans apparently used to designate years of the sexagenary cycle) has been established by analyzing dates in Khitan inscriptions.

While there has long been controversy as to whether a particular monument belong to the large or small script, there are several monuments (steles or fragments of stelae) that the specialists at least tentatively identify as written in the Khitan large script. However, one of the first inscriptions so identified (the Gu taishi mingshi ji epitaph, found in 1935) has been since lost, and the preserved rubbings of it are not very legible; moreover, some believe that this inscription was a forgery in the first place. In any event, the total of about 830 different large-script characters are thought to have been identified, even without the problematic Gu taishi mingshi ji; including it, the character count rises to about 1000. The Memorial for Yelü Yanning (dated 986 CE) is one of the earliest inscriptions in the Khitan large script.

=== Direction ===
While the Khitan large script was traditionally written top-to-bottom, it can also be written left-to-right, which is the direction to be expected in modern contexts for the Khitan large script and other traditionally top-to-bottom scripts, especially in electronic text.

== Jurchen ==
Some of the characters of the Jurchen scripts have similarities to the Khitan large script. According to some sources, the discoveries of inscriptions on monuments and epitaphs give clues to the connection between Khitan and Jurchen. After the fall of the Liao dynasty, the Khitan (small-character) script continued to be used by the Jurchen people for a few decades, until it was fully replaced with the Jurchen script and, in 1191, suppressed by imperial order.

== Corpus ==
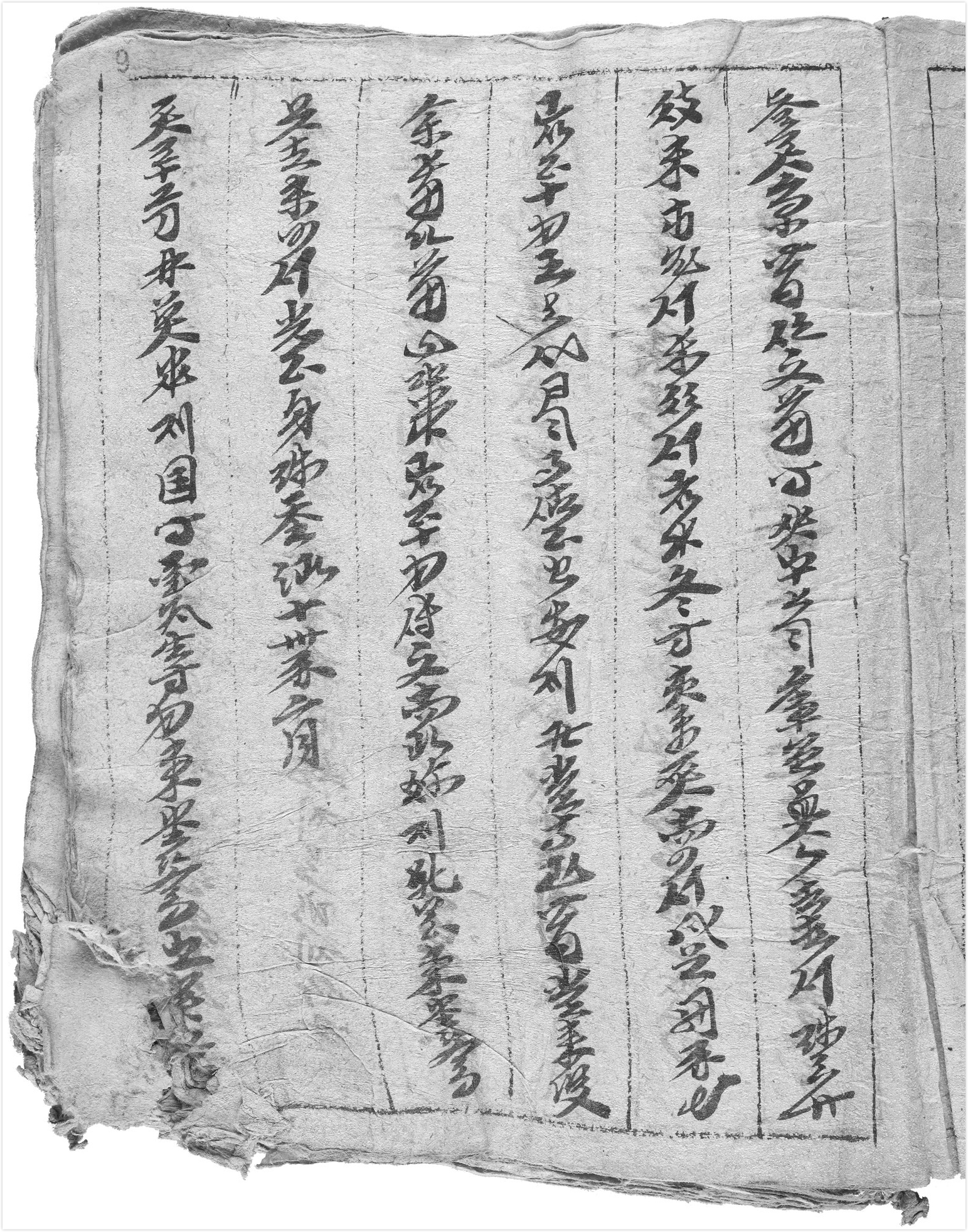
Folio 9 of manuscript codex Nova N 176

There are no surviving examples of printed texts in the Khitan language, and aside from five example Khitan large characters with Chinese glosses in Tao Zongyi's 1376 Important Matters in the History of Calligraphy, there are no Chinese glossaries or dictionaries of Khitan. However, in 2002 a small fragment of a Khitan manuscript with seven Khitan large characters and interlinear glosses in Old Uyghur was identified in the collection of the Berlin-Brandenburg Academy of Sciences and Humanities. Then, in 2010 a manuscript codex (Nova N 176) held at the Institute of Oriental Manuscripts of the Russian Academy of Sciences in Saint Petersburg was identified by Viacheslav Zaytsev as being written in the Khitan large script.

The main source of Khitan texts are monumental inscriptions, mostly comprising memorial tablets buried in the tombs of Khitan nobility. There are about 17 known monuments with inscriptions in the Khitan large script, ranging in date from 986 to 1176.

In addition to monumental inscriptions, short inscriptions in both Khitan scripts have also been found on tomb murals and rock paintings, and on various portable artefacts such as mirrors, amulets, paiza (tablets of authority given to officials and envoys), and special non-circulation coins. A number of bronze official seals with the seal face inscribed in a convoluted seal script style of Khitan characters are also known.
