= Daniel Kane (linguist) =

Australian linguist (1948–2021)

- Born: 25 January 1948; Melbourne, Australia
- Died: 16 April 2021 (aged 73); Melbourne, Australia
- Children: 3

Academic background
- Education: University of Melbourne; Australian National University

Academic work
- Discipline: Linguist
- Institutions: Macquarie University
- Main interests: Jurchen; Khitan

Daniel Kane (Chinese: 康丹; pinyin: Kāng Dān; 25 January 1948 – 16 April 2021) was an Australian diplomat and linguist, and one of the world's foremost authorities on the extinct Jurchen and Khitan languages and their scripts.

== Biography ==
Daniel Kane was born in January 1948 in Melbourne. Bereaved of his father when young, circumstances of extreme poverty constrained him to cut his education short and enter the work force at 16. He left school and joined a bank, working as a teller at a branch in Lygon Street, Carlton. There the then Dean of Arts at the university noticed he had a remarkable talent for languages, appearing to speak to Greek and Italian clients fluently - he had picked up Italian, for one, listening and talking to the sons of immigrants at school in his preteen years - and invited him to finish high school and take up studies at the nearby university. He undertook further education in his spare time and matriculated to Melbourne University with high honours.

He took a First Class Honours degree there in 1971, majoring in Chinese and Russian and was granted a Ph.D. scholarship to the ANU. His Ph.D. was conferred in 1975 with a thesis on the Jurchen language a Tungusic language a precursor of, and related to Manchu spoken during the Jin dynasty in North China.

Parallel to his academic career, Kane has also had a career in diplomacy. He joined the Australian Department of Foreign Affairs in 1976 and was posted to Beijing for four years (1976-1980) during the early part of the reform period and particularly the period of the Democracy Wall which he rose early to read every morning and whose unsurpassed knowledge of which formed the basis of much of what was known outside China of that movement. He was also Cultural Counsellor at the Australian Embassy in Beijing for two years in the 1990s (1995–1997).

Academically he was lecturer in Chinese at the University of Melbourne in 1981 and visiting scholar at the Department of Chinese at Peking University in 1988 and 1993. From 1997 he was Professor of Chinese at Macquarie University in Sydney until his retirement in 2012.

He was widowed in 2010 when his wife, the Shanghai scholar of Qing history and Chinese modernization, Yè Xiǎoqīng (葉曉青), died of cancer, after risking her initial recovery from an early diagnosis of cancer to bear their son Ian (易安 (Yìān).

Kane suffered for several years from Parkinson's disease.

== Publications ==
=== Books ===
- Kane, Daniel (1989). The Sino-Jurchen Vocabulary of the Bureau of Interpreters (PDF). Bloomington: Research Institute for Inner Asian Studies, Indiana University. ISBN 0-933070-23-3.
- Kane, Daniel (2006). The Chinese Language: Its History and Current Usage. North Clarendon, Vermont: Tuttle Publishing. ISBN 978-0-8048-3853-5.
- Kane, Daniel (2009). The Kitan Language and Script. Leiden: Brill. ISBN 978-90-04-16829-9.

=== Papers ===
- Kane, Daniel (1997). "Language Death and Language Revivalism: The Case of Manchu". Central Asiatic Journal. 41 (2): 231–249. JSTOR 41928113.
