= Paiza =

Tablet carried by Mongol officials to signify authority

A paiza, paizi, or gerege (Middle Mongolian: Гэрэгэ, Mongolian: Пайз, Persian: پایزه pāiza, Chinese: 牌子 páizi or Chinese: 牌面 páimiàn) was a tablet carried by Mongol officials and envoys to signify certain privileges and authority. They enabled Mongol nobles and officials to demand goods and services from civilian populations.

== History and usage ==
Although paizas were popularised by the Mongols, they were not (contrary to common claim) a Mongol innovation, arguably combining the functions of tally (Chinese: 符) - which certified authorisation from higher authorities - and Paiza systems - which functioned as passes for the use of select official roads. Indeed, the Mongol Paiza drew on similar such passports which were already in use in northern China under the Tang, Liao and Jin dynasty and the Tangut kingdom of Xi Xia. Similarly, in previous dynasties, a tally acted as a proof of authority - for example to authenticate mobilisation orders from the emperor.

Under Chinggis Khan, Mongol Paizas were likely first introduced in the early years of the Mongol conquest of the Jin dynasty. Strongly inspired by the earlier Jin paiza which had seven different ranks, they were organised in four statuses: golden tiger, gold, silver, and wood. An accompanying warrant, a jarlig, specified the reason for conferring the paiza and, in case of higher ranks like the tiger's head, the specific privileges it granted. Although nominally only entitling the bearer to use the imperial relay stations or yam (zam) and select benefits, higher badges conferred nearly unlimited authority in practice, particularly over civilians. Persian historians like Rashid al-Din Hamadani and Ata-Malik Juvayni have given detailed accounts of the resulting chaos and tyranny in the Western reaches of the Mongol Empire, in modern day Iran. Although only someone with a paiza was required to be supplied with mounts and served specified rations, those carrying military rarities used the yam even without a paiza.

A number of powerful Mongol rulers later attempted to reduce the number and power of paizas. Ögedei Khan (r. 1229–1241) prohibited the nobility from issuing paizas and jarligs, but they were distributed again widely in the long years between his death and the start of Möngke Khan's rule.

To attract foreign or overseas merchants and talents, the Great Khans had given them paiza exempting them from taxes and allowing them to use relay stations. Most of these merchants were business partners of the Mongols, known as ortoq. However, Möngke Khan (r. 1251–1259) limited notorious abuses and sent imperial investigators to supervise the business of the merchants who were sponsored by the Mongols. He prohibited them from using yam and paizas.

Under Kublai Khan, the golden tiger tablet was divided into three ranks and a new category, the gerfalcon paiza, gave active duty officers the right to use specific gerfalcon yam. Marco Polo, who visited the Yuan dynasty during the reign of Kublai Khan (r. 1260–1294), left a good description of the paiza.

The Ilkhan Ghazan (r. 1295–1304) reformed the issuance of jarligs, creating set forms and graded seals, ordering that all jarligs be kept on file at court and canceling jarligs older than 30 years and old paizas. He fashioned new paizas into two ranks, ordered that they bear the names of the bearers on them to prevent them from being transferred and required them to be relinquished at the end of the official's term.

Under the Qing dynasty, a postroad system was maintained in Mongolia. So-called "postroad riding certificates” (ulaa unukhu temdeg) were issued to specific offices and were reportedly more effectively limited to actual postroad use.

== Gallery ==
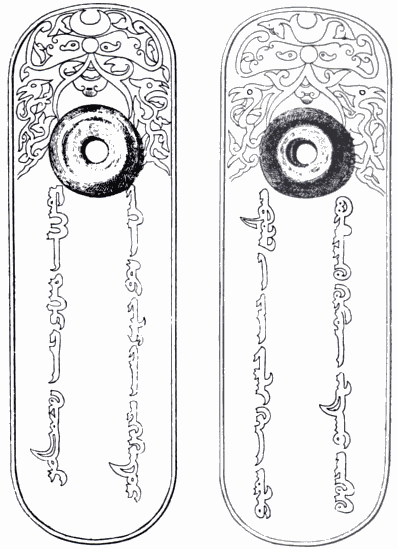
A gerege in Mongolian script, found in the former territory of the Mongol Golden Horde (Dnieper River, 1845)

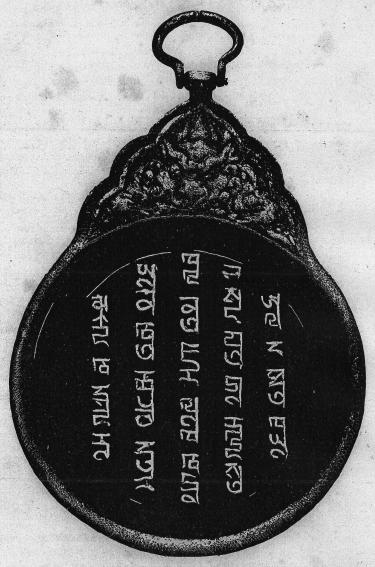
Official pass with Mongolian inscription in 'Phags-pa script reading "By the power of eternal heaven, [this is] an order of the Emperor. Whoever does not show respect [to the bearer] will be guilty of an offense."

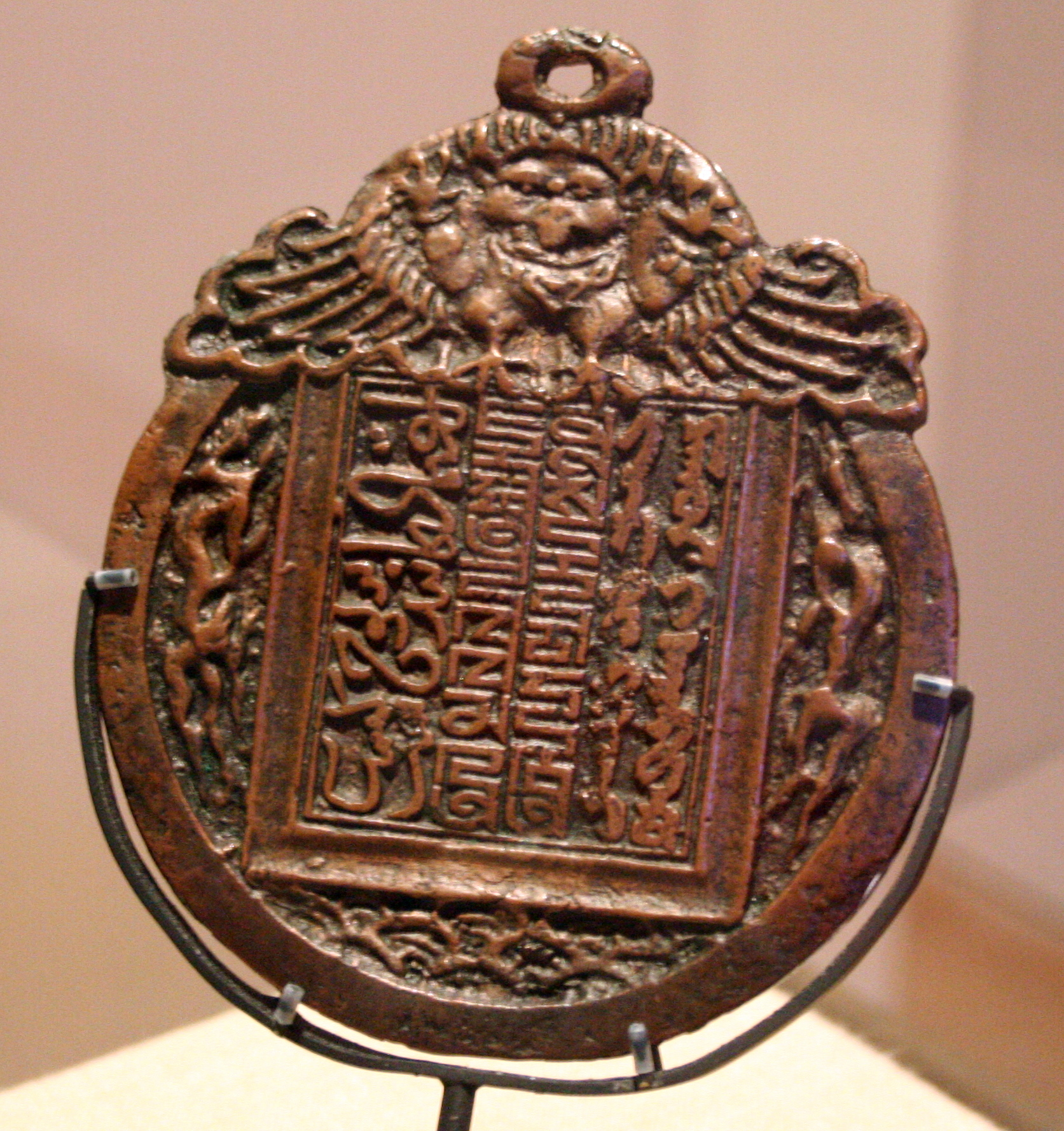
A nightwatchman's pass of the Mongol empire, with inscriptions in Persian (left), Mongolian in 'Phags-pa script (center), and Uyghur (right). The Mongolian inscription reads "Announcement: Beware of evil-doers".

== See also ==
- Laissez-passer
