= Third conjugation =

Third conjugation may refer to:

- Latin conjugation#Third conjugation
- Bulgarian conjugation#Third conjugation
- French conjugation#Third group
- Portuguese verb conjugation#Third conjugation (partir)
