= Bulgarian verbs =

Bulgarian verbs are the most complicated part of Bulgarian grammar, especially when compared with other Slavic languages. Bulgarian verbs are inflected for person, number and sometimes gender. They also have lexical aspect (perfective and imperfective), voice, nine tenses, three moods, (Note: These are the indicative, the imperative and the conditional. Additionally, the inferential is treated as a fourth mood by those linguists who do not include it within the evidential system (e.g. Kutsarov 2007, p. 282-286). And there are a few authors who treat da-forms as constituting a conjunctive mood, but the prevailing opinion is against this view (Kutsarov 2007, p.282, Nitsolova 2008, p. 327)) four evidentials and six non-finite verbal forms. Because the subject of the verb can be inferred from the verb ending, it is often omitted. As there is no infinitive in contemporary Bulgarian, the basic form of a verb is its present simple tense first person singular form.

== Conjugations ==
There are three conjugations. The conjugation of a verb is determined by the final vowel of the verb in the third person singular present simple tense. Verbs of the first conjugation end in e, of the second in и and of the third in а or я.

== Aspect ==
As is typical of Slavic languages, Bulgarian verbs express lexical aspect (вид). The verbs are either of imperfective (глаголи от несвършен вид) or perfective (глаголи от свършен вид) aspect. The former describe actions in progress (uncompleted actions) and the latter whole completed actions (actions which have a beginning and an end). So in Bulgarian, an English verb is usually translated by two verbs (or sometimes by even three, see below). Perfective verbs can be usually formed from imperfective ones by suffixation or prefixation, but when prefixes (or very rarely suffixes) are used the resultant verb often deviates in meaning from the original. There are not any strict rules and irregularities are very common. Nevertheless many verbs can be grouped according to their stem change:

Perfective	Imperfective	Perfective	Imperfective	Perfective	Imperfective
предложа	предлагам	отговоря	отговарям	кажа	казвам
изложа	излагам	изговоря	изговарям	накажа	наказвам
сложа	слагам	преговоря	преговарям	предскажа	предсказвам
възложа	възлагам	договоря	договарям	докажа	доказвам

The verbs from one pair are of different conjugations, for example кажа is from the first conjugation and казвам from the third.

In the past imperfect and the present tense perfective verbs cannot stand alone in an independent clause, in these tenses such verbs are used only in subordinate clauses.

=== Secondary imperfective verbs ===
Very often when a perfective verb is formed from an imperfective one by means of a prefix (or rarely a suffix) this verb can be made again imperfective using a suffix. The resultant verb is called secondary imperfective verb (вторичен несвършен глагол). Here are some examples of such verbs:

Initial imperfective verb	Perfective verb	Secondary imperfective verb	Meaning
мета	измета	измитам	to sweep
вадя	извадя	изваждам	to take out
лъжа	излъжа	излъгвам	to tell a lie
мажа	намажа	намазвам	to spread, to smear
уча	науча	научавам	to learn
пиша	напиша	написвам	to write
чета	прочета	прочитам	to read
мърдам	мръдна	мръдвам	to move
топя	топна	топвам	to dip

Verbs from the first type describe uncompleted actions (for example the verb мета could be roughly translated in English as to be sweeping), verbs from the second describe whole, completed actions. Verbs from the third type are a combination between the first two. Although they are imperfective as the initial ones, they preserve the perfective meaning of the second verbs, they are only grammatically imperfective.

An explanation of the nuances between the three columns follows:

- Initial imperfective – мета (meta) – I'm sweeping (continuing action)
- Perfective – ще измета / искам да измета – (shte izmeta / iskam da izmeta) – I'll sweep up / I want to sweep up (i.e. I'm announcing that the action will be completed – the perfective form cannot exist in the present indicative as, by definition, it refers to a completed action)
- Secondary imperfective – измитам – (izmitam) – I'm sweeping away completely. (The verbs in this column put the emphasis on the fact that the actions are being carried out in their entirety)

Secondary imperfective verbs are used in cases where it's grammatically incorrect to use perfective verbs (there are tenses, the present tense for example, where perfective verbs cannot stand alone in an independent clause) but one wants to use their meaning, or where the action is complete but repeated over time. See below for examples.

=== Contrasting imperfective, perfective and secondary imperfective verbs ===
Adverbial participle

- imperfective verb: Четейки книгата, срещнах непозната дума = "While I was reading the book, I came across an unknown word" (at one single moment of the action I came across an unknown word)
- perfective verb: no adverbial participle
- secondary imperfective verb: Прочитайки книгата, научих много нови неща. = "By reading the book, I learned a lot of new things" (during the whole action I learned a lot, so after I had read the book I knew a lot of new things)

Present tense

- imperfective verb:
  - Чета книга = "I read a book, I'm reading a book" (uncompleted action)
  - Когато чета книга, се удремвам = "When I read a book, I become sleepy" (While I'm in the middle of the action; uncompleted action)
  - Всеки ден чета книга = "I read a book every day" (but this does not necessarily mean that I read a whole book, just a part of it; uncompleted repetitive action)
- perfective verb: Когато прочета книгата, ще ти я върна = "When I finish reading the book, I will give it back to you" (when I have read the whole book; completed action)
- secondary imperfective verb: Всеки ден прочитам една книга = "I read a whole book every day" (I begin reading and I finish reading a book every day; completed repetitive action)

Past imperfect

- imperfective verb:
  - Четях книга = "I was reading a book", "I used to read a book" (but not a whole book; uncompleted action)
  - Когато четях книгата, телефонът звънна = "When I was reading the book, the phone rang" (uncompleted action)
  - Всеки ден четях книга = "I used to read a book every day" (but not a whole book, uncompleted repetitive action)
- perfective verb: Щом прочетях нова книга, започвах да се хваля всекиму = "Whenever I finished reading a new book, I started boasting about it to everyone" (completed repetitive action, notice that the verb is in a dependent clause)
- secondary imperfective verb: Всеки ден прочитах една книга = "I used to read a whole book every day" (I used to begin and finish reading a book every day; completed repetitive action, notice that the verb is in an independent clause)

Past aorist

- imperfective verb: Вчера четох една книга = "Yesterday, I read a book" (but did not necessarily finish it; uncompleted action)
- perfective verb: Вчера прочетох една книга = "Yesterday, I finished reading a book" (I read a whole book; completed action)
- secondary imperfective verb: identical with the past imperfect

Future tense

- imperfective verb:
  - Ще чета книгата = "I will read the book" (but not necessarily the whole book), "I will be reading the book" (uncompleted action)
  - Всеки ден ще чета книгата = "I will read the book every day" (but this does not necessarily mean that I will read the whole book, just a part of it; uncompleted repetitive action)
- perfective verb: Ще прочета книгата = "I will read the whole book just once" (I will begin and I will finish reading the book only one time; single completed action)
- secondary imperfective verb: Ще прочитам книгата всеки ден = "I will read the whole book every day" (I will begin and I will finish reading the book every day; completed repetitive action)

== Tenses ==
=== Present (praesens) ===
The present tense is used to:

- describe an action that is happening at the moment of speaking;
- talk about things that are always true;
- talk about habits or things that happen on a regular basis;

Imperfective and perfective verbs are conjugated in the same way.

Verbs form the present tense according to their conjugation. They take the following personal endings:

	Personal endings					
Person	1st conjugation		2nd conjugation		3rd conjugation	
Person	Singular	Plural	Singular	Plural	Singular	Plural
1st	-а/я	-м	-а/я	-м	-м	-ме
2nd	-еш	-ете	-иш	-ите	-ш	-те
3rd	– е	-ат/ят	– и	-ат/ят	–	-т

See Bulgarian verb paradigm for the full conjugation.

==== Discrepancy between spelling and pronunciation ====
Although verbs of the first and second conjugation in first person singular end in -а/я, and in third person plural in -ат/ят, when the stress falls on these endings, they are not pronounced а/йа and ат/йат but ъ/йъ and ът/йът instead.

Discrepancy between spelling and pronunciation	
Correct spelling Incorrect pronunciation	Correct pronunciation Incorrect spelling
чета четат	четъ̀ четъ̀т
летя летят	летьъ̀ летьъ̀т

The incorrect pronunciation is considered to be an error.

==== Neologisms ====
Newly adopted verbs, especially from English, tend to take a –ирам (–iram) ending, in which case they only have one form (the imperfective). Since this is not a native suffix (loaned from German verbal suffix -ieren), recent colloquial formations prefer the native suffixes –вам (-vam) and –на (–na) which do form an imperfective/perfective pair. Examples:

- стартирам (startiram – to start), инициирам (initsiiram – to initiate), нокаутирам (nokautiram – to knock out), and even страницирам (stranitsiram – to paginate, with a native stem and the German suffix);
- кликвам/кликна (klikvam/klikna – to click), даунлоудвам/даунлоудна (daunloudvam/daunloudna – to download), шеървам/шеърна (shearvam/shearna – to fileshare).

These verbs, especially the latter group, are extremely new and have not yet made it into the dictionaries.

=== Past imperfect (imperfectum) ===
Past Imperfect (Минало несвършено време) is used to talk about a temporary situation that existed at or around a particular time in the past. It also expresses past actions that were frequent, repeated, permanent or always true. Its most common use is in story telling to provide a background to other actions which are usually expressed with verbs in the past aorist. In this use it means that the action had begun and was in progress when the other action(s) happened, we do not know whether it stopped or not.

Both imperfective and perfective verbs have past imperfect. They are conjugated in the same way.

Verbs form the past imperfect with the following endings (they are the same for all conjugations):

Personal endings Past Imperfect
Person	Number	
Person	Singular	Plural
First	-х	-хме
Second	-ше	-хте
Third	-ше	-ха

These endings are added to the past imperfect basis. See Bulgarian verb paradigm for the full conjugation.

=== Past aorist (aoristus) ===
Past aorist (Минало свършено време) expresses an action that happened at a specific time in the past. Both imperfective and perfective verbs have such tense (there is no difference in their conjugation).

Similarly, as in past imperfect, verbs have past aorist basis to which the following personal endings are added (they are the same for all conjugations):

Personal endings Past Aorist
Person	Number	
Person	Singular	Plural
First	-х	-хме
Second	–	-хте
Third	–	-ха

See Bulgarian verb paradigm for the full conjugation.

==== Imperfective and perfective verbs ====
Although imperfective and perfective verbs are conjugated in the same way in the past aorist, there is difference in their meaning. Compare the sentences:

With an imperfective verb	Meaning	With a perfective verb	Meaning
Вчера четох една книга	Yesterday, I read a book but I did not finish it	Вчера прочетох една книга	Yesterday, I finished reading a book/I read a whole book.

=== Past imperfect or past aorist ===
Usually the difference between the two tenses is very clear:

- past imperfect is used for habits, things that were always true, actions that happened many times or for background for other actions.
- past aorist is used for single actions that have a beginning and an end.

But imperfective verbs both in past imperfect and past aorist can express actions that have long duration and therefore both tenses can be used to say that one action happened at the same time as another. One should always keep in mind that past aorist means that the action began and stopped, and past imperfect that the action was in progress. Compare the sentences (they all contain the imperfective verb играя that expresses an action with some duration, but depending on the tense the sentences have different meaning):

Sentence	Meaning
Докато децата играеха навън, едно от тях си счупи крака.	While the kids were playing outside one of them broke his/her leg. (играеха is in past imperfect and счупи is a perfective verb in past aorist. This means that at a single moment of their play the kid broke his/her leg)
Децата си прекараха чудесно, докато играха навън.	The kids had a great time playing outside. Literal translation: The kids had a great time while they played outside. (прекараха is a perfective verb in past aorist and играха is in past aorist. Since играха is not in past imperfect the sentence means that the kids had a great time during the whole time they played outside, not just at a single moment)
Децата играха навън, докато не заваля.	The kids played outside until it started raining. (The action ended that's why играха is in the past aorist, not in the past imperfect)
Децата играеха навън. Изведнъж заваля, но продължиха да играят.	The kids were playing outside. Suddenly, it started raining but they continued to play. (The action did not end so играеха cannot be in the past aorist)

=== Present perfect (perfectum) ===
Present perfect (in Bulgarian минало неопределено време, past indefinite tense) expresses an action which happened in the past, but the precise moment when it happened is not specified. It is either not known or not important (in contrast with past aorist). What is important is the result of the action. The tense has a lot in common with the English present perfect.

Present perfect is made up of the verb съм, conjugated in present tense, and the past active aorist participle of the main verb. Not only person (first, second, third) and number, but also gender must be taken into account in the process of conjugating. In other words, the corresponding indefinite forms of the participle (masculine, feminine, neuter, singular, plural) are used according to the gender and number of the subject. For the position of the verb съм see word order.

Example (чета, to read):

Present perfect
person	gender and number			
person	m.sg.	f.sg.	n.sg.	pl.
1st	чел съм	чела съм	(чело съм)	чели сме
2nd	чел си	чела си	(чело си)	чели сте
3rd	чел е	чела е	чело е	чели са

In contrast with English, in Bulgarian (very rarely) the present perfect can be used even if the moment when the action happened is specified. In such cases the importance of the action or its result is emphasized:

- Снощи до два часа съм гледал телевизия и тази сутрин съм станал в шест, затова съм изключително изтощен. = "Last night, I watched TV until 2 o'clock and this morning, I got up at six, so I'm extremely exhausted."

=== Past perfect ===
Past perfect (in Bulgarian минало предварително време, "past preliminary tense") expresses an action that happened before another past action. It is made up of the past tense of съм and the past active aorist participle of the main verb. Again as in present perfect the participle agrees in number and gender with the subject. For the position of the verb съм see word order.

Example (чета, to read):

Past perfect
person	gender and number			
person	m.sg.	f.sg.	n.sg.	pl.
1st	бях чел	бях чела	(бях чело)	бяхме чели
2nd	бе(ше) чел	бе(ше) чела	(бе(ше) чело)	бяхте чели
3rd	бе(ше) чел	бе(ше) чела	бе(ше) чело	бяха чели

Rarely the past perfect can be used for actions that happened at an indefinite time in the past but very long ago, especially in sentences containing the phrase "someone sometimes said":

- Някой някога беше казал, че любовта ще спаси света. = "Someone once said that love will save the world."

=== Future (futurum primum) ===
The future tense (in Bulgarian бъдеще време) is formed with the particle ще (derived from the verb ща, "to want") and the present simple tense (ще always stands before the present forms). In contrast with the other tenses negation is not expressed with the particle не, but with the construction няма да + the present tense. Forms with не are also possible but they are found mainly in the poetry.

Example (чета, to read):

Future, positive
person	number	
person	sg.	pl.
1st	ще чета	ще четем
2nd	ще четеш	ще четете
3rd	ще чете	ще четат

Future, negative
person	number	
person	sg.	pl.
1st	няма да чета	няма да четем
2nd	няма да четеш	няма да четете
3rd	няма да чете	няма да четат

The verb съм forms the future in two ways. The first one with its present tense, and the second one with its special future form – бъда. The latter is more common:

Future Tense of съм
Person	Number							
Person	Singular				Plural			
Person	Positive		Negative		Positive		Negative	
1st	ще съм	ще бъда	няма да съм	няма да бъда	ще сме	ще бъдем	няма да сме	няма да бъдем
2nd	ще си	ще бъдеш	няма да си	няма да бъдеш	ще сте	ще бъдете	няма да сте	няма да бъдете
3rd	ще е	ще бъде	няма да е	няма да бъде	ще са	ще бъдат	няма да са	няма да бъдат

=== Future perfect (futurum secundum exactum) ===
Future perfect (in Bulgarian бъдеще предварително време, future preliminary tense) expresses an action which is to take place in the future before another future action. It is made up of the future tense of the verb съм (in this tense the form with бъда is less common than the usual one) and the past active aorist participle of the main verb which agrees in number and gender with the subject.

Example (чета, to read):

Future perfect, positive
person	gender and number			
person	m.sg.	f.sg.	n.sg.	pl.
1st	ще съм чел	ще съм чела	(ще съм чело)	ще сме чели
2nd	ще си чел	ще си чела	(ще си челo)	ще сте чели
3rd	ще е чел	ще е чела	ще е чело	ще са чели

Future perfect, negative
person	gender and number			
person	m.sg.	f.sg.	n.sg.	pl.
1st	няма да съм чѐл	няма да съм чѐла	(няма да съм чѐло)	няма да сме чѐли
2nd	няма да си чѐл	няма да си чѐла	(няма да си чѐлo)	няма да сте чѐли
3rd	няма да е чѐл	няма да е чѐла	няма да е чѐло	няма да са чѐли

=== Future-in-the-past ===
Past future tense or future in the past (in Bulgarian бъдеще време в миналото, future tense in the past) expresses a past action which is future with respect to another past action. It is made up of the past imperfect of the verb ща "will, want", the particle да "to" and the present tense of the main verb. Negation is expressed with the construction нямаше да + the present tense, although forms with не are also possible but found mainly in the poetry.

Example (чета, to read):

Future-in-the-past, positive
person	number	
person	sg.	pl.
1st	щях да чета	щяхме да четем
2nd	щеше да четеш	щяхте да четете
3rd	щеше да чете	щяха да четат

Future-in-the-past, negative
person	number	
person	sg.	pl.
1st	нямаше да чета	нямаше да четем
2nd	нямаше да четеш	нямаше да четете
3rd	нямаше да чете	нямаше да четат

The verb съм forms the future in the past in two ways. The first one with its present tense, and the second one with бъда (щях да съм and щях да бъда). The latter is more common.

=== Future-in-the-past perfect ===
Past future perfect or future perfect in the past (in Bulgarian бъдеще предварително време в миналото, future preliminary tense in the past) expresses a past action which is prior to a past action which itself is future with respect to another past action. It is made up of the past imperfect of ща "will, want", the particle да "to", the present tense of the verb съм "be" (in other words, the past future tense of съм, but not the form with бъда) and the past active aorist participle of the main verb, which agrees in number and gender with the subject.

Example (чета, to read):

Future-in-the-past perfect, positive
person	gender and number			
person	m.sg.	f.sg.	n.sg.	pl.
1st	щях да съм чѐл	щях да съм чѐла	(щях да съм чѐло)	щяхме да сме чѐли
2nd	щеше да си чѐл	щеше да си чѐла	(щеше да си чѐлo)	щяхте да сте чѐли
3rd	щеше да е чѐл	щеше да е чѐла	щеше да е чѐло	щяха да са чѐли

Future-in-the-past perfect, negative
person	gender and number			
person	m.sg.	f.sg.	n.sg.	pl.
1st	нямаше да съм чѐл	нямаше да съм чѐла	(нямаше да съм чѐло)	нямаше да сме чѐли
2nd	нямаше да си чѐл	нямаше да си чѐла	(нямаше да си чѐлo)	нямаше да сте чѐли
3rd	нямаше да е чѐл	нямаше да е чѐла	нямаше да е чѐло	нямаше да са чѐли

== Voice ==
The voice in Bulgarian adjectives is presented not through the auxiliary verb, as it is in English ("I have eaten" – active; "I was eaten" – passive), but rather by the ending on the past participle; the auxiliary remains съм ("to be"):

- Active – ударил съм... – udaril săm... – I have hit...
- Passive – бил съм ударен – bil săm udaren – I have been hit

See also Participles, below.

== Mood ==
Modal distinctions in subordinate clauses are expressed not through verb endings, but through the choice of complementizer – че (che) or да (da) (which might both be translated with the relative pronoun "that"). The verbs remain unchanged. (Note: In ordinary sentences, the imperfective aspect is most often used for the indicative, and the perfective for the subjunctive, but any combination is possible, with the corresponding change in meaning.: eg iskam da stanesh (perfective) / iskam da stavash (imperfective) – i want you to get up.; The latter is more insisting, since the imperfective is the more immediate construction.) Thus:

- Indicative – че –
  - e.g. знам, че си тук – znam, che si tuk – I know that you are here;
- Subjunctive – да –
  - e.g. настоявам да си тук – nastoyavam da si tuk – I insist that you be here.

The imperative has its own conjugation – usually by adding -и or -ай (-i or -ay) to the root of the verb:

- e.g. sit – сядам → сядай (syadam → syaday – imperfective), or седна → седни (sedna → sedni – perfective).

=== Conditional mood ===
The so-called conditional refers to a possible action, which is usually intentional and under the control of a subject. It is formed by a special form (Note: Historically, it is the aorist form.) of the auxiliary 'съм' (to be), and the aorist active participle of the main verb:

person	gender and number			
person	m.sg.	f.sg.	n.sg.	pl.
1st	бѝх чѐл	бѝх чѐла	(бѝх чѐло)	бѝхме чѐли
2nd	бѝ чѐл	бѝ чѐла	(бѝ чѐло)	бѝхте чѐли
3rd	бѝ чѐл	бѝ чѐла	бѝ чѐло	бѝха чѐли

== Evidentials ==
Bulgarian verbs are inflected not only for aspect, tense and modality, but also for evidentiality, that is, the source of the information conveyed by them. There is a four-way distinction between the unmarked (indicative) forms, which imply that the speaker was a witness of the event or knows it as a general fact; the inferential, which signals general non-witness information or one based on inference; the renarrative, which indicates that the information was reported to the speaker by someone else; and the dubitative, which is used for reported information if the speaker doubts its veracity. This can be illustrated with the four possible ways of rendering in Bulgarian the English sentence 'The dog ate the fish' (here AORPT denotes the aorist active participle):

Indicative:

Ку̀чето изя̀де рѝбата
kuče-to izjad-e riba-ta
dog-DEF eat-AOR.3sg fish-DEF
"I know from my own observation that the dog ate the fish."

Inferential:

Ку̀чето е изя̀ло рѝбата
kuče-to e izjal-o riba-ta
dog-DEF be.3sg eat.AORPT-N.SG fish-DEF
"The dog must have eaten the fish." (The speaker did not witness it, but inferred it, for example, from the fact that the fish was missing and there was a pile of fish bones by the kennel.)

Renarrative:

Ку̀чето изя̀ло рѝбата
kuče-to izjal-o riba-ta
dog-DEF eat.AORPT-N.SG fish-DEF
"I've been told that the dog ate the fish."

Dubitative:

Ку̀чето било̀ изя̀ло рѝбата
kuče-to bil-o izjal-o riba-ta
dog-DEF be.AORPT-N.SG eat.AORPT-N.SG fish-DEF
"I've been told that the dog ate the fish, but I doubt it." (Alternatively, this can be taken to imply that the speaker has heard about it from someone else, who in turn was not a witness of the event).

On a theoretical level, there are alternatives to treating those forms as the four members of a single evidential category. Kutsarov, for example, posits a separate category, which he terms 'type of utterance' (вид на изказването), proper to which is only the distinction between forms expressing speaker's own statements (indicative, inferential), and forms that retell statements of another (renarrative, dubitative). The inferential is then viewed as one of the moods, and the dubitative – as a renarrative inferential, whose dubitative meaning, albeit more frequent, is only secondary. Another view is presented by Gerdzhikov – in his treatment there are two distinctive features involved – subjectivity and renarrativity. The indicative is unmarked for both, while the inferential is marked for subjectivity, the renarrative for renarrativity, and the dubitative for both subjectivity and renarrativity.

=== Forms ===
An evidential for a given tense is formed by taking the past active participle of the verb (or auxiliary, if there is one) of the corresponding indicative tense, and adding a form of the auxiliary verb съм (to be). For the inferential and the renarrative it is its present tense form, which, however, is omitted in the 3rd person of the renarrative; hence inferential and renarrative forms are generally not distinguished in the 1st and 2nd person. The dubitative is formed from the renarrative by adding the past active participle of the verb съм (to be). An example paradigm is given in the following table. Given for reference are some tenses of the indicative (these are the imperfect, aorist, perfect, future in the past and future perfect in the past). Whenever there are participles involved, they are given in their masculine form, but they have different forms for the three genders in the singular. (Note: Exceptions are the auxiliary ня̀мало in all negative future and future perfect forms, and ня̀мало било̀ in the negative future (perfect) dubitative, which always remain in the neuter singular.)

Conjugation of чета̀ (to read) in the evidential system
Tense		Person and Number	Evidential			
Tense		Person and Number	Indicative	Inferential (Note: There are inferential forms only for the past tenses – imperfect, aorist, past perfect and future (perfect) in the past (Nitsolova 2008, p. 353). Thus, while the renarrative form четя̀л can have both present and imperfect meaning, the corresponding inferential четя̀л е can only be imperfect.)	Renarrative	Dubitative
Present and Imperfect		1sg	четя̀х	четя̀л съм	четя̀л съм	бѝл съм четя̀л
Present and Imperfect		2sg	четѐше	четя̀л си	четя̀л си	бѝл си четя̀л
Present and Imperfect		3sg	четѐше	четя̀л е	четя̀л	бѝл четя̀л
Present and Imperfect		1pl	четя̀хме	четѐли сме	четѐли сме	билѝ сме четѐли
Present and Imperfect		2pl	четя̀хте	четѐли сте	четѐли сте	билѝ сте четѐли
Present and Imperfect		3pl	четя̀ха	четѐли са	четѐли	билѝ четѐли
Aorist		1sg	чѐтох	чѐл съм	чѐл съм	бѝл съм чѐл
Aorist		2sg	чѐте	чѐл си	чѐл си	бѝл си чѐл
Aorist		3sg	чѐте	чѐл е	чѐл	бѝл чѐл
Aorist		1pl	чѐтохме	чѐли сме	чѐли сме	билѝ сме чѐли
Aorist		2pl	чѐтохте	чѐли сте	чѐли сте	билѝ сте чѐли
Aorist		3pl	чѐтоха	чѐли са	чѐли	билѝ чѐли
Perfect and Past Perfect		1sg	чѐл съм	бѝл съм чѐл	бѝл съм чѐл	бѝл съм чѐл
Perfect and Past Perfect		2sg	чѐл си	бѝл си чѐл	бѝл си чѐл	бѝл си чѐл
Perfect and Past Perfect		3sg	чѐл е	бѝл е чѐл	бѝл чѐл	бѝл чѐл
Perfect and Past Perfect		1pl	чѐли сме	билѝ сме чѐли	билѝ сме чѐли	билѝ сме чѐли
Perfect and Past Perfect		2pl	чѐли сте	билѝ сте чѐли	билѝ сте чѐли	билѝ сте чѐли
Perfect and Past Perfect		3pl	чѐли са	билѝ са чѐли	билѝ чѐли	билѝ чѐли
Future and Future in the Past	pos.	1sg	щя̀х да чета̀	щя̀л съм да чета̀	щя̀л съм да чета̀	щя̀л съм бѝл да чета̀
Future and Future in the Past	pos.	2sg	щѐше да четѐш	щя̀л си да четѐш	щя̀л си да четѐш	щя̀л си бѝл да четѐш
Future and Future in the Past	pos.	3sg	щѐше да четѐ	щя̀л е да четѐ	щя̀л да четѐ	щя̀л бѝл да четѐ
Future and Future in the Past	pos.	1pl	щя̀хме да четѐм	щѐли сме да четѐм	щѐли сме да четѐм	щѐли сме билѝ да четѐм
Future and Future in the Past	pos.	2pl	щя̀хте да четѐте	щѐли сте да четѐте	щѐли сте да четѐте	щѐли сте билѝ да четѐте
Future and Future in the Past	pos.	3pl	щя̀ха да чета̀т	щѐли са да чета̀т	щѐли да чета̀т	щѐли билѝ да чета̀т
Future and Future in the Past	neg.	1sg	ня̀маше да чета̀	ня̀мало съм да чета̀	ня̀мало (съм) да чета̀	ня̀мало било̀ да чета̀
Future and Future in the Past	neg.	2sg	ня̀маше да четѐш	ня̀мало си да четѐш	ня̀мало (си) да четѐш	ня̀мало било̀ да четѐш
Future and Future in the Past	neg.	3sg	ня̀маше да четѐ	ня̀мало е да четѐ	ня̀мало да четѐ	ня̀мало било̀ да четѐ
Future and Future in the Past	neg.	1pl	ня̀маше да четѐм	ня̀мало сме да четѐм	ня̀мало (сме) да четѐм	ня̀мало било̀ да четѐм
Future and Future in the Past	neg.	2pl	ня̀маше да четѐте	ня̀мало сте да четѐте	ня̀мало (сте) да четѐте	ня̀мало било̀ да четѐте
Future and Future in the Past	neg.	3pl	ня̀маше да чета̀т	ня̀мало са да чета̀т	ня̀мало да чета̀т	ня̀мало било̀ да чета̀т
Future Perfect and Future Perfect in the Past	pos.	1sg	щя̀х да съм чѐл	щя̀л съм да съм чѐл	щя̀л съм да съм чѐл	щя̀л съм бѝл да съм чѐл
Future Perfect and Future Perfect in the Past	pos.	2sg	щѐше да си чѐл	щя̀л си да си чѐл	щя̀л си да си чѐл	щя̀л си бѝл да си чѐл
Future Perfect and Future Perfect in the Past	pos.	3sg	щѐше да е чѐл	щя̀л е да е чѐл	щя̀л да е чѐл	щя̀л бѝл да е чѐл
Future Perfect and Future Perfect in the Past	pos.	1pl	щя̀хме да сме чѐли	щѐли сме да сме чѐли	щѐли сме да сме чѐли	щѐли сме билѝ да сме чѐли
Future Perfect and Future Perfect in the Past	pos.	2pl	щя̀хте да сте чѐли	щѐли сте да сте чѐли	щѐли сте да сте чѐли	щѐли сте билѝ да сте чѐли
Future Perfect and Future Perfect in the Past	pos.	3pl	щя̀ха да са чѐли	щѐли са да са чѐли	щѐли да са чѐли	щѐли билѝ да са чѐли
Future Perfect and Future Perfect in the Past	neg.	1sg	ня̀маше да съм чѐл	ня̀мало съм да съм чѐл	ня̀мало (съм) да съм чѐл	ня̀мало било̀ да съм чѐл
Future Perfect and Future Perfect in the Past	neg.	2sg	ня̀маше да си чѐл	ня̀мало си да си чѐл	ня̀мало (си) да си чѐл	ня̀мало било̀ да си чѐл
Future Perfect and Future Perfect in the Past	neg.	3sg	ня̀маше да е чѐл	ня̀мало е да е чѐл	ня̀мало да е чѐл	ня̀мало било̀ да е чѐл
Future Perfect and Future Perfect in the Past	neg.	1pl	ня̀маше да сме чѐли	ня̀мало сме да сме чѐли	ня̀мало (сме) да сме чѐли	ня̀мало било̀ да сме чѐли
Future Perfect and Future Perfect in the Past	neg.	2pl	ня̀маше да сте чѐли	ня̀мало сте да сте чѐли	ня̀мало (сте) да сте чѐли	ня̀мало било̀ да сте чѐли
Future Perfect and Future Perfect in the Past	neg.	3pl	ня̀маше да са чѐли	ня̀мало са да са чѐли	ня̀мало да са чѐли	ня̀мало било̀ да са чѐли
			Indicative	Inferential	Renarrative	Dubitative

Additionally, there are also a few rare forms for some of the future tenses. In some cases, there are less common forms in which the auxiliary ще remains impersonal instead of being inflected for person and number; thus for the inferential and renarrative future/future in the past rare forms of the type ще съм четя̀л are possible alongside the more common forms of the type щя̀л съм да чета̀, for the inferential future perfect in the past – ще съм бѝл чѐл alongside the usual щя̀л съм да съм чѐл, and for the dubitative future/ future in the past – rare forms of the type ще съм бѝл четя̀л in addition to the more common forms of the type щя̀л съм бѝл да чета̀. Also, the negative form of the dubitative future perfect/future perfect in the past can be either ня̀мало било̀ да съм чѐл, or ня̀мало съм бил да съм чѐл.

=== Inferential ===
==== Present and Imperfect Inferential ====
Present Inferential is not used.

Imperfect Inferential
person	gender and number			
person	m.sg.	f.sg.	n.sg.	pl.
1st	четя̀л съм	четя̀лa съм	(четя̀лo съм)	четѐли сме
2nd	четя̀л си	четя̀лa си	(четя̀лo си)	четѐли сте
3rd	четя̀л е	четя̀лa е	четя̀л е	четѐли са

==== Aorist Inferential ====
Aorist Inferential
person	gender and number			
person	m.sg.	f.sg.	n.sg.	pl.
1st	чел съм	чела съм	(чело съм)	чели сме
2nd	чел си	чела си	(чело си)	чели сте
3rd	чел е	чела е	чело е	чели са

==== Present Perfect and Past Perfect Inferential ====
Present Perfect Inferential is not used.

Past Perfect Inferential
person	gender and number			
person	m.sg.	f.sg.	n.sg.	pl.
1st	бѝл съм чѐл	бѝлa съм чѐлa	(бѝлo съм чѐлo)	билѝ сме чѐли
2nd	бѝл си чѐл	бѝлa си чѐлa	(бѝлo си чѐлo)	билѝ сте чѐли
3rd	бѝл е чѐл	бѝлa е чѐлa	бѝлo е чѐлo	билѝ са чѐли

==== Future and Future-in-the-past Inferential ====
Future Inferential is not used.

Future-in-the-past Inferential, positive
person	gender and number			
person	m.sg.	f.sg.	n.sg.	pl.
1st	щя̀л съм да чета̀	щя̀лa съм да чета̀	(щя̀лo съм да чета̀)	щѐли сме да четѐм
2nd	щя̀л си да четѐш	щя̀лa си да четѐш	(щя̀лo си да четѐш)	щѐли сте да четѐте
3rd	щя̀л е да четѐ	щя̀лa е да четѐ	щя̀лo е да четѐ	щѐли са да чета̀т

Future-in-the-past Inferential, negative
person	number	
person	sg.	pl.
1st	ня̀мало съм да чета̀	ня̀мало сме да четѐм
2nd	ня̀мало си да четѐш	ня̀мало сте да четѐте
3rd	ня̀мало е да четѐ	ня̀мало са да чета̀т

==== Future Perfect and Future-in-the-past Perfect Inferential ====
Future Perfect Inferential is not used.

Future-in-the-past Perfect Inferential, positive
person	gender and number			
person	m.sg.	f.sg.	n.sg.	pl.
1st	щя̀л съм да съм чѐл	щя̀лa съм да съм чѐлa	(щя̀лo съм да съм чѐлo)	щѐли сме да сме чѐли
2nd	щя̀л си да си чѐл	щя̀лa си да си чѐлa	(щя̀лo си да си чѐлo)	щѐли сте да сте чѐли
3rd	щя̀л е да е чѐл	щя̀лa е да е чѐлa	щя̀лo е да е чѐлo	щѐли са да са чѐли

Future-in-the-past Perfect Inferential, negative
person	gender and number			
person	m.sg.	f.sg.	n.sg.	pl.
1st	ня̀мало съм да съм чѐл	ня̀мало съм да съм чѐлa	(ня̀мало съм да съм чѐлo)	щѐли сме да сме чѐли
2nd	ня̀мало си да си чѐл	ня̀мало си да си чѐлa	(ня̀мало си да си чѐлo)	щѐли сте да сте чѐли
3rd	ня̀мало е да е чѐл	ня̀мало е да е чѐлa	ня̀мало е да е чѐлo	щѐли са да са чѐли

=== Renarrative ===
==== Present and Imperfect Renarrative ====
Present and Imperfect Renarrative
person	gender and number			
person	m.sg.	f.sg.	n.sg.	pl.
1st	четя̀л съм	четя̀лa съм	(четя̀лo съм)	четѐли сме
2nd	четя̀л си	четя̀лa си	(четя̀лo си)	четѐли сте
3rd	четя̀л	четя̀лa	четя̀л	четѐли

==== Aorist Renarrative ====
Aorist Renarrative
person	gender and number			
person	m.sg.	f.sg.	n.sg.	pl.
1st	чел съм	чела съм	(чело съм)	чели сме
2nd	чел си	чела си	(чело си)	чели сте
3rd	чел	чела	чело	чели

==== Present Perfect and Past Perfect Renarrative ====
Present Perfect and Past Perfect Renarrative
person	gender and number			
person	m.sg.	f.sg.	n.sg.	pl.
1st	бѝл съм чѐл	бѝлa съм чѐлa	(бѝлo съм чѐлo)	билѝ сме чѐли
2nd	бѝл си чѐл	бѝлa си чѐлa	(бѝлo си чѐлo)	билѝ сте чѐли
3rd	бѝл чѐл	бѝлa чѐлa	бѝлo чѐлo	билѝ чѐли

==== Future and Future-in-the-past Renarrative ====
Future and Future-in-the-past Renarrative, positive
person	gender and number			
person	m.sg.	f.sg.	n.sg.	pl.
1st	щя̀л съм да чета̀	щя̀лa съм да чета̀	(щя̀лo съм да чета̀)	щѐли сме да четѐм
2nd	щя̀л си да четѐш	щя̀лa си да четѐш	(щя̀лo си да четѐш)	щѐли сте да четѐте
3rd	щя̀л да четѐ	щя̀лa да четѐ	щя̀лo да четѐ	щѐли да чета̀т

Future and Future-in-the-past Renarrative, negative
person	number	
person	sg.	pl.
1st	ня̀мало (съм) да чета̀	ня̀мало (сме) да четѐм
2nd	ня̀мало (си) да четѐш	ня̀мало (сте) да четѐте
3rd	ня̀мало да четѐ	ня̀мало да чета̀т

==== Future Perfect and Future-in-the-past Perfect Renarrative ====
Future Perfect and Future-in-the-past Perfect Renarrative, positive
person	gender and number			
person	m.sg.	f.sg.	n.sg.	pl.
1st	щя̀л съм да съм чѐл	щя̀лa съм да съм чѐлa	(щя̀лo съм да съм чѐлo)	щѐли сме да сме чѐли
2nd	щя̀л си да си чѐл	щя̀лa си да си чѐлa	(щя̀лo си да си чѐлo)	щѐли сте да сте чѐли
3rd	щя̀л да е чѐл	щя̀лa да е чѐлa	щя̀лo да е чѐлo	щѐли да са чѐли

Future Perfect and Future-in-the-past Perfect Renarrative, negative
person	gender and number			
person	m.sg.	f.sg.	n.sg.	pl.
1st	ня̀мало (съм) да съм чѐл	ня̀мало (съм) да съм чѐлa	(ня̀мало (съм) да съм чѐлo)	щѐли (сме) да сме чѐли
2nd	ня̀мало (си) да си чѐл	ня̀мало (си) да си чѐлa	(ня̀мало (си) да си чѐлo)	щѐли (сте) да сте чѐли
3rd	ня̀мало да е чѐл	ня̀мало да е чѐлa	ня̀мало да е чѐлo	щѐли да са чѐли

=== Dubitative ===
==== Present and Imperfect Dubitative ====
Present and Imperfect Dubitative
person	gender and number			
person	m.sg.	f.sg.	n.sg.	pl.
1st	бѝл съм четя̀л	бѝла съм четя̀ла	(бѝло съм четя̀ло)	билѝ сме четѐли
2nd	бѝл си четя̀л	бѝла си четя̀ла	(бѝло си четя̀ло)	билѝ сте четѐли
3rd	бѝл четя̀л	бѝла четя̀ла	бѝл четя̀л	билѝ четѐли

==== Aorist, Present Perfect and Past Perfect Dubitative ====
Notice that Present Perfect and Past Perfect Dubitative have the same forms as Aorist Dubitative.

Aorist Dubitative
person	gender and number			
person	m.sg.	f.sg.	n.sg.	pl.
1st	бѝл съм чѐл	бѝлa съм чѐлa	(бѝлo съм чѐлo)	билѝ сме чѐли
2nd	бѝл си чѐл	бѝлa си чѐлa	(бѝлo си чѐлo)	билѝ сте чѐли
3rd	бѝл чѐл	бѝлa чѐлa	бѝлo чѐлo	билѝ чѐли

==== Future and Future-in-the-past Dubitative ====
Future and Future-in-the-past Dubitative, positive
person	gender and number			
person	m.sg.	f.sg.	n.sg.	pl.
1st	щя̀л съм бѝл да чета̀	щя̀ла съм бѝла да чета̀	щя̀ло съм бѝло да чета̀	щѐли сме билѝ да четѐм
2nd	щя̀л си бѝл да четѐш	щя̀ла си бѝла да четѐш	щя̀ло си бѝло да четѐш	щѐли сте билѝ да четѐте
3rd	щя̀л бѝл да четѐ	щя̀ла бѝла да четѐ	щя̀ло бѝло да четѐ	щѐли билѝ да чета̀т

Future and Future-in-the-past Dubitative, negative
person	number	
person	sg.	pl.
1st	ня̀мало било̀ да чета̀	ня̀мало било̀ да четѐм
2nd	ня̀мало било̀ да четѐш	ня̀мало било̀ да четѐте
3rd	ня̀мало било̀ да четѐ	ня̀мало било̀ да чета̀т

==== Future Perfect and Future-in-the-past Perfect Dubitative ====
Future Perfect and Future-in-the-past Perfect Dubitative, positive
person	gender and number			
person	m.sg.	f.sg.	n.sg.	pl.
1st	щя̀л съм бѝл да съм чѐл	щя̀лa съм бѝла да съм чѐлa	(щя̀лo съм бѝло да съм чѐлo)	щѐли сме билѝ да сме чѐли
2nd	щя̀л си бѝл да си чѐл	щя̀лa си бѝла да си чѐлa	(щя̀лo си бѝло да си чѐлo)	щѐли сте билѝ да сте чѐли
3rd	щя̀л бѝл да е чѐл	щя̀лa бѝла да е чѐлa	щя̀лo бѝло да е чѐлo	щѐли билѝ да са чѐли

Future Perfect and Future-in-the-past Perfect Dubitative, negative
person	gender and number			
person	m.sg.	f.sg.	n.sg.	pl.
1st	ня̀мало било̀ да съм чѐл	ня̀мало било̀ да съм чѐлa	(ня̀мало било̀ да съм чѐлo)	ня̀мало било̀ да сме чѐли
2nd	ня̀мало било̀ да си чѐл	ня̀мало било̀ да си чѐлa	(ня̀мало било̀ да си чѐлo)	ня̀мало било̀ да сте чѐли
3rd	ня̀мало било̀ да е чѐл	ня̀мало било̀ да е чѐлa	ня̀мало било̀ да е чѐлo	ня̀мало било̀ да са чѐли

== Non-finite verb forms ==
=== Participles ===
==== Past active participle ====
Past active aorist participle (минало свършено деятелно причастие) is used to form the present perfect, in the renarrative and conditional mood and as an adjective. It is formed by adding -л (this is its masculine indefinite form) to the past aorist basis (first person singular past aorist tensе but without the final х), but additional alterations of the basis are also possible. The indefinite feminine, neuter and plural forms take respectively the endings -а, -о and -и after the masculine form. The definite forms are formed from the indefinite by adding the definite articles -ят/я for masculine participles, та for feminine participles, то for neuter participles and те for plural participles

See also Voice above

See Bulgarian verb paradigm for the full conjugation.

==== Past active renarrative participle ====
Can be used only predicatively

=== Action nouns ===
==== Action nouns ending in -не ====
Can be formed only from imperfective verbs

==== Action nouns ending in -ние ====
Can be formed from both imperfective and perfective verbs

=== Obsolete verb forms ===
==== Present passive participle ====
Obsolete; used only as adjective in modern Bulgarian

==== Infinitive ====
Obsolete

== Bibliography ==
- Gerdzhikov, Georgi (2003) [1984], Преизказаването на глаголното действие в българския език (in Bulgarian), Sofia: St. Kliment Ohridksi University, ISBN 954-07-1834-1
- Kutsarov, Georgi (2007), Теоретична граматика на българския език. Морфология (in Bulgarian), Plovdiv: Paisiy Hilendarski, ISBN 978-954-423-376-1
- Nitsolova, Ruselina (2008), Българска граматика. Морфология (in Bulgarian), Sofia: St. Kliment Ohridksi University, ISBN 978-954-07-2738-7
