= Bulgarian conjugation =

Bulgarian conjugation is the creation of derived forms of a Bulgarian verb from its principal parts by inflection. It is affected by person, number, gender, tense, mood and voice. Bulgarian verbs are conventionally divided into three conjugations according to the thematic vowel they use in the present tense:

- 1st conjugation: verbs using the vowel е (/ɛ/).
- 2nd conjugation: verbs using the vowel и (/i/).
- 3rd conjugation: athematic verbs, stems end in а or я.

In a dictionary, Bulgarian verbs are listed with their first-person-singular-present-tense form, due to the lack of an infinitive. This form is called the citation form.

Bulgarian verbs are conjugated using the formula:

$\mathrm{verb\ form} = \mbox{stem} + \mbox{thematic vowel} + \mbox{inflectional suffix}$

where thematic vowel and inflection suffix are only optional. The stem of the verb is what is left of the citation form after removing its final letter. Sometimes in the course of conjugation, the stem may undergo some alterations. In this article, any alteration of the stem is coloured in blue, the thematic vowels are coloured in red, and the inflectional endings in green.

== Inflectional suffixes ==
=== Personal endings ===
Below are the endings for all finite forms:

| Tense/Mood | Conjugation | Singular | | | Plural | | |
| Tense/Mood | Conjugation | 1st person | 2nd person | 3rd person | 1st person | 2nd person | 3rd person |
|---|---|---|---|---|---|---|---|
| Present | First | -a (/ɐ/^{1} or /ɤ/^{2}) -я (/jɐ/^{1} or /jɤ/^{2}) -м^{3} (/m/) | -ш (/ʃ/) | -∅ | -м (/m/) | -те (/t̪ɛ/) | -ат (/ɐt̪/^{1} or /ɤt̪/^{2}) -ят (/jɐt̪/^{1} or /jɤt̪/^{2}) |
| Present | Second | -a (/ɐ/^{1} or /ɤ/^{2}) -я (/jɐ/^{1} or /jɤ/^{2}) -м^{3} (/m/) | -ш (/ʃ/) | -∅ | -м (/m/) | -те (/t̪ɛ/) | -ат (/ɐt̪/^{1} or /ɤt̪/^{2}) -ят (/jɐt̪/^{1} or /jɤt̪/^{2}) |
| Present | Third | -м (/m/) | -ш (/ʃ/) | -∅ | -ме (/mɛ/) | -те (/t̪ɛ/) | -т (/t̪/) |
| Past Imperfect | All three | -х (/x/) | -ше (/ʃɛ/) | | -хме (/xmɛ/) | -хте (/xt̪ɛ/) | -ха (/xɐ/) |
| Past Aorist | All three | -х (/x/) | -∅ | | -хме (/xmɛ/) | -хте (/xt̪ɛ/) | -ха (/xɐ/) |
| Imperative | All three | - | -∅ | - | - | -те (/t̪ɛ/) | - |

^{1} When unstressed.

^{2} When stressed.

^{3} Only some irregular first conjugation verbs.

=== Non-finite form endings ===
These are the endings for the non-finite forms:

| | Indefinite | | | | Definite | | | | |
| | Masculine | Feminine | Neuter | Plural | Masculine subject form | Masculine object form | Feminine | Neuter | Plural |
|---|---|---|---|---|---|---|---|---|---|
| Present Active Participle | -щ /ʃt̪/ | -ща /ʃt̪ɐ/ | -що /ʃt̪o̝/ | -щи /ʃt̪i/ | -щият /ʃt̪ijɐt̪/ | -щия /ʃt̪ijɐ/ | -щата /ʃt̪ɐt̪ɐ/ | -щото /ʃt̪o̝t̪o̝/ | -щите /ʃt̪it̪ɛ/ |
| Past Active Aorist Participle | -л /ɫ/ | -ла /ɫɐ/ | -ло /ɫo̝/ | -ли /li/ | -лият /lijɐt̪/ | -лия /lijɐ/ | -лата /ɫɐt̪ɐ/ | -лото /ɫo̝t̪o̝/ | -лите /lit̪ɛ/ |
| Past Active Imperfect Participle | -л /ɫ/ | -ла /ɫɐ/ | -ло /ɫo̝/ | -ли /li/ | - | - | - | - | - |
| Past Passive Participle | -н /n/ -т /t̪/ | -на /nɐ/ -та /t̪ɐ/ | -но /no̝/ -то /t̪o̝/ | -ни /ni/ -ти /t̪i/ | -ният /nijɐt̪/ -тият /t̪ijɐt̪/ | -ния /nijɐ/ -тия /t̪ijɐ/ | -ната /nɐt̪ɐ/ -тата /t̪ɐt̪ɐ/ | -ното /no̝t̪o̝/ -тото /t̪o̝t̪o̝/ | -ните /nit̪ɛ/ -тите /t̪it̪ɛ/ |
| Verbal noun | - | - | -не /nɛ/ | -ния /nijɐ/ -нета /nɛt̪ɐ/ | - | - | - | -нето /nɛt̪o̝/ | -нията /nijɐt̪ɐ/ -нетата /nɛt̪ɐt̪ɐ/ |
| Adverbial participle | -йки /jkʲi/ | | | | | | | | |

== Thematic vowels ==
Below is a table of the thematic vowels. They are inserted between the stem and the ending.

| Tense/Mood | First | | | | | | | Second | | | Third | |
| Tense/Mood | 1st | 2nd | 3rd | 4th | 5th | 6th | 7th | 1st | 2nd | 3rd | 1st | 2nd |
|---|---|---|---|---|---|---|---|---|---|---|---|---|
| Present | е (/ɛ/) | | | | | | | и (/i/) | | | ∅ | |
| Past Imperfect | Yat vowel: я (/ja/), а (/a/), or е (/ɛ/) | | | | | | | | | | ∅ | |
| Past Aorist | о (/o̝/) е (/ɛ/) | а (/ɐ/ or /a/) | | | Yat: я (/ja/) | я (/jɐ/ or /ja/) | ∅ | и (/i/) | Yat: я (/ja/) | а (/a/) | ∅ | |
| Imperative | и (/i/), е (/ɛ/), й (/j/) | | | | | | | | | | й (/j/) | |

== Finite forms ==
=== Present Tense ===
==== First conjugation ====
Verbs from the first conjugation use the thematic vowel е (/ɛ/) between the stem and the personal endings, except in first person singular and third person plural, where the endings are added directly to the stem.

All verbs with citation forms ending in а use the endings -а and -ат in first person singular and third person plural respectively.

| Citation form | Stem | Present Tense | | | | | |
| Citation form | Stem | Singular | | | Plural | | |
| Citation form | Stem | 1st person | 2nd person | 3rd person | 1st person | 2nd person | 3rd person |
|---|---|---|---|---|---|---|---|
| чета /tʃɛˈt̪ɤ/ | чет- /tʃɛt̪/ | чета* /tʃɛˈt̪ɤ/ | четеш /tʃɛˈt̪ɛʃ/ | чете /tʃɛˈt̪ɛ/ | четем /tʃɛˈt̪ɛm/ | четете /tʃɛˈt̪ɛt̪ɛ/ | четат* /tʃɛˈt̪ɤt̪/ |
| пиша /ˈpiʃə/ | пиш- /piʃ/ | пиша /ˈpiʃə/ | пишеш /ˈpiʃɛʃ/ | пише /ˈpiʃɛ/ | пишем /ˈpiʃɛm/ | пишете /ˈpiʃɛt̪ɛ/ | пишат /ˈpiʃət̪/ |

* Notice that the endings -а and -ат when stressed are pronounced /ɤ/ and /ɤt̪/, not /a/, /at̪/.

All verbs with stems ending in a vowel use the endings -я and -ят in first person singular and third person plural respectively.

| Citation form | Stem | Present Tense | | | | | |
| Citation form | Stem | Singular | | | Plural | | |
| Citation form | Stem | 1st person | 2nd person | 3rd person | 1st person | 2nd person | 3rd person |
|---|---|---|---|---|---|---|---|
| пея /ˈpɛjə/ | пе- /pɛ/ | пея /ˈpɛjə/ | пееш /ˈpɛ.ɛʃ/ | пее /ˈpɛ.ɛ/ | пеем /ˈpɛ.ɛm/ | пеете /ˈpɛ.ɛt̪ɛ/ | пеят /ˈpɛjət̪/ |
| играя /iˈɡrajə/ | игра- /iˈɡra/ | играя /iˈɡrajə/ | играеш /iˈɡra.ɛʃ/ | играе /iˈɡra.ɛ/ | играем /iˈɡra.ɛm/ | играете /iˈɡra.ɛt̪ɛ/ | играят /iˈɡrajət̪/ |

All verbs with citation forms ending in я also use the endings -я and -ят in first person singular and third person plural.

| Citation form | Stem | Present Tense | | | | | |
| Citation form | Stem | Singular | | | Plural | | |
| Citation form | Stem | 1st person | 2nd person | 3rd person | 1st person | 2nd person | 3rd person |
|---|---|---|---|---|---|---|---|
| къпя /ˈkɤpʲə/ | къп- /kɤp/ | къпя /ˈkɤpʲə/ | къпеш /ˈkɤpɛʃ/ | къпе /ˈkɤpɛ/ | къпем /ˈkɤpɛm/ | къпете /ˈkɤpɛt̪ɛ/ | къпят /ˈkɤpʲət̪/ |
| дремя /drɛmʲə/ | дрем- /drɛm/ | дремя /ˈdrɛmʲə/ | дремеш /ˈdrɛmɛʃ/ | дреме /ˈdrɛmɛ/ | дремем /ˈdrɛmɛm/ | дремете /ˈdrɛmɛt̪ɛ/ | дремят /ˈdrɛmʲət̪/ |

All verbs with stems ending in -к (/k/) or -г (/g/) change to -ч (/tʃ/) and -ж (/ʒ/) respectively, before the thematic vowel е. This change is not limited solely to the present tense and happens always before /i/, /ɛ/ and the yat vowel.

| Citation form | Stem | Present Tense | | | | | |
| Citation form | Stem | Singular | | | Plural | | |
| Citation form | Stem | 1st person | 2nd person | 3rd person | 1st person | 2nd person | 3rd person |
|---|---|---|---|---|---|---|---|
| пека /pɛˈkɤ/ | пек- /pɛk/ | пека /pɛˈkɤ/ | печеш /pɛˈtʃɛʃ/ | пече /pɛˈtʃɛ/ | печем /pɛˈtʃɛm/ | печете /pɛˈtʃɛt̪ɛ/ | пекат /pɛˈkɤt̪/ |
| мога /ˈmɔɡə/ | мог- /mɔɡ/ | мога /ˈmɔɡə/ | можеш /ˈmɔʒɛʃ/ | може /ˈmɔʒɛ/ | можем /ˈmɔʒɛm/ | можете /ˈmɔʒɛt̪ɛ/ | могат /ˈmɔɡət̪/ |

==== Second conjugation ====
Verbs from the second conjugation use the thematic vowel и (/i/) between the stem and the personal endings, except in first person singular and third person plural, where the endings are added directly to the stem.

All verbs with stems not ending in -ж (/ʒ/), -ч (/tʃ/) or -ш (/ʃ/) use the endings -я and -ят in first person singular and third person plural.

| Citation form | Stem | Present Tense | | | | | |
| Citation form | Stem | Singular | | | Plural | | |
| Citation form | Stem | 1st person | 2nd person | 3rd person | 1st person | 2nd person | 3rd person |
|---|---|---|---|---|---|---|---|
| говоря /ɡoˈvɔrʲə/ | говор- /ɡoˈvɔr/ | говоря /ɡoˈvɔrʲə/ | говориш /ɡoˈvɔriʃ/ | говори /ɡoˈvɔri/ | говорим /ɡoˈvɔrim/ | говорите /ɡoˈvɔrit̪ɛ/ | говорят /ɡoˈvɔrʲət̪/ |
| вървя /vɐrˈvʲɤ/ | върв- /vɐrv/ | вървя* /vɐrˈvʲɤ/ | вървиш /vɐrˈviʃ/ | върви /vɐrˈvi/ | вървим /vɐrˈvim/ | вървите /vɐrˈvit̪ɛ/ | вървят* /vɐrˈvʲɤt̪/ |
| стоя /st̪oˈjɤ/ | сто- /st̪o/ | стоя* /st̪oˈjɤ/ | стоиш /st̪oˈiʃ/ | стои /st̪oˈi/ | стоим /st̪oˈim/ | стоите /st̪oˈit̪ɛ/ | стоят* /st̪oˈjɤt̪/ |

* Notice that the endings -я and -ят when stressed are pronounced /jɤ/ and /jɤt̪/, not /ja/, /jat̪/.

All verbs with stems ending in -ж (/ʒ/), -ч (/tʃ/) or -ш (/ʃ/) use the endings -а and -ат in first person singular and third person plural.

| Citation form | Stem | Present Tense | | | | | |
| Citation form | Stem | Singular | | | Plural | | |
| Citation form | Stem | 1st person | 2nd person | 3rd person | 1st person | 2nd person | 3rd person |
|---|---|---|---|---|---|---|---|
| движа /d̪viʒə/ | движ- /d̪viʒ/ | движа /ˈd̪viʒə/ | движиш /ˈd̪viʒiʃ/ | движи /ˈd̪viʒi/ | движим /ˈd̪viʒim/ | движите /ˈd̪viʒit̪ɛ/ | движат /ˈd̪viʒət̪/ |
| мълча /mɐɫˈtʃɤ/ | мълч- /mɐɫtʃ/ | мълча* /mɐɫˈtʃɤ/ | мълчиш /mɐɫˈtʃiʃ/ | мълчи /mɐɫˈtʃi/ | мълчим /mɐɫˈtʃim/ | мълчите /mɐɫˈtʃit̪ɛ/ | мълчат* /mɐɫˈtʃɤt̪/ |

* Notice that the endings -а and -ат when stressed are pronounced /ɤ/ and /ɤt̪/, not /a/, /at̪/.

==== Third conjugation ====
Strictly speaking, verbs from the third conjugation are athematic, because the personal endings are added directly to the stem with no thematic vowel in between. It may seem that the vowel а (/ə/) is inserted between them, but that vowel is actually part of the stem. All verbs have stems ending in either а or я.

| Citation form | Stem | Present Tense | | | | | |
| Citation form | Stem | Singular | | | Plural | | |
| Citation form | Stem | 1st person | 2nd person | 3rd person | 1st person | 2nd person | 3rd person |
|---|---|---|---|---|---|---|---|
| искам /ˈiskəm/ | иска- /ˈiskə/ | искам /ˈiskəm/ | искаш /ˈiskəʃ/ | иска /ˈiskə/ | искаме /ˈiskəmɛ/ | искате /ˈiskət̪ɛ/ | искат /ˈiskət̪/ |
| стрелям /ˈstrɛlʲəm/ | стреля- /ˈstrɛlʲə/ | стрелям /ˈstrɛlʲəm/ | стреляш /ˈstrɛlʲəʃ/ | стреля /ˈstrɛlʲə/ | стреляме /ˈstrɛlʲəmɛ/ | стреляте /ˈstrɛlʲət̪ɛ/ | стрелят /ˈstrɛlʲət̪/ |

=== Past Imperfect ===
The past imperfect always follows the stress patterns of the present tense.

==== First and second conjugation ====
These verbs use the old yat vowel between the stem and the personal endings. When stressed, it is pronounced as /ja/ (written я) or /a/ (written а) after /ʒ/, /tʃ/ and /ʃ/. When unstressed, it is pronounced as /ɛ/ (written е). In second and third person singular it is always pronounced as /ɛ/.

| Citation form | Stem | Past Imperfect | | | | | |
| Citation form | Stem | Stressed yat vowel | | | | | |
| Citation form | Stem | Singular | | | Plural | | |
| Citation form | Stem | 1st person | 2nd person | 3rd person | 1st person | 2nd person | 3rd person |
|---|---|---|---|---|---|---|---|
| чета /tʃɛˈt̪ɤ/ | чет- /tʃɛt̪/ | четях /tʃɛˈt̪ʲax/ | четеше /tʃɛˈt̪ɛʃɛ/ | четеше /tʃɛˈt̪ɛʃɛ/ | четяхме /tʃɛˈt̪ʲaxmɛ/ | четяхте /tʃɛˈt̪ʲaxt̪ɛ/ | четяха /tʃɛˈt̪ʲaxə/ |
| вървя /vɐrˈvʲɤ/ | върв- /vɐrv/ | вървях /vɐrˈvʲax/ | вървеше /vɐrˈvɛʃɛ/ | вървеше /vɐrˈvɛʃɛ/ | вървяхме /vɐrˈvʲaxmɛ/ | вървяхте vɐrˈvʲaxt̪ɛ/ | вървяха /vɐrˈvʲaxə/ |
| пека /pɛˈkɤ/ | пек- /pɛk/ | печах* /pɛˈtʃax/ | печеше* /pɛˈtʃɛʃɛ/ | печеше* /pɛˈtʃɛʃɛ/ | печахме* /pɛˈtʃaxmɛ/ | печахте* /pɛˈtʃaxt̪ɛ/ | печаха* /pɛˈtʃaxə/ |
| мълча /mɐɫˈtʃɤ/ | мълч- /mɐɫtʃ/ | мълчах /mɐɫˈtʃax/ | мълчеше /mɐɫˈtʃɛʃɛ/ | мълчеше /mɐɫˈtʃɛʃɛ/ | мълчахме /mɐɫˈtʃaxmɛ/ | мълчахте /mɐɫˈtʃaxt̪ɛ/ | мълчаха /mɐɫˈtʃaxə/ |

| Citation form | Stem | Past Imperfect | | | | | |
| Citation form | Stem | Unstressed yat vowel | | | | | |
| Citation form | Stem | Singular | | | Plural | | |
| Citation form | Stem | 1st person | 2nd person | 3rd person | 1st person | 2nd person | 3rd person |
|---|---|---|---|---|---|---|---|
| пиша /ˈpiʃə/ | пиш- /ˈpiʃ/ | пишех /ˈpiʃɛx/ | пишеше /ˈpiʃɛʃɛ/ | пишеше /ˈpiʃɛʃɛ/ | пишехме /ˈpiʃɛxmɛ/ | пишехте /ˈpiʃɛxt̪ɛ/ | пишеха /ˈpiʃɛxə/ |
| говоря /ɡoˈvɔrʲə/ | говор- /ɡoˈvɔr/ | говорех ɡoˈvɔrɛx/ | говореше ɡoˈvɔrɛʃɛ/ | говореше ɡoˈvɔrɛʃɛ/ | говорехме ɡoˈvɔrɛxmɛ/ | говорехте ɡoˈvɔrɛxt̪ɛ/ | говореха ɡoˈvɔrɛxə/ |
| мога /ˈmɔɡə/ | мог- /ˈmɔɡ/ | можех* /ˈmɔʒɛx/ | можеше* /ˈmɔʒɛʃɛ/ | можеше* /ˈmɔʒɛʃɛ/ | можехме* /ˈmɔʒɛxmɛ/ | можехте* /ˈmɔʒɛxt̪ɛ/ | можеха* /ˈmɔʒɛxə/ |
| движа /ˈd̪viʒə/ | движ- /ˈd̪viʒ/ | движех /ˈd̪viʒɛx/ | движеше /ˈd̪viʒɛʃɛ/ | движеше /ˈd̪viʒɛʃɛ/ | движехме /ˈd̪viʒɛxmɛ/ | движехте /ˈd̪viʒɛxt̪ɛ/ | движеха /ˈd̪viʒɛxə/ |

* The consonants к (/k/) and г (/g/) change to ч (/tʃ/) and ж (/ʒ/) before the front vowels е (/ɛ/) and и (/i/).

Additionally, after ж (/ʒ/), ч (/tʃ/) and ш (/ʃ/) the stressed yat vowel can be pronounced either as /a/ (as above) or as /ɛ/. The latter forms have fallen largely into disuse.

| Citation form | Stem | Past Imperfect | | | | | |
| Citation form | Stem | Stressed yat vowel | | | | | |
| Citation form | Stem | Singular | | | Plural | | |
| Citation form | Stem | 1st person | 2nd person | 3rd person | 1st person | 2nd person | 3rd person |
|---|---|---|---|---|---|---|---|
| пека /pɛˈkɤ/ | пек- /pɛk/ | печех /pɛˈtʃɛx/ | печеше /pɛˈtʃɛʃɛ/ | печеше /pɛˈtʃɛʃɛ/ | печехме /pɛˈtʃɛxmɛ/ | печехте /pɛˈtʃɛxt̪ɛ/ | печеха /pɛˈtʃɛxə/ |
| мълча /mɐɫˈtʃɤ/ | мълч- /mɐɫtʃ/ | мълчех /mɐɫˈtʃɛx/ | мълчеше /mɐɫˈtʃɛʃɛ/ | мълчеше /mɐɫˈtʃɛʃɛ/ | мълчехме /mɐɫˈtʃɛxmɛ/ | мълчехте /mɐɫˈtʃɛxt̪ɛ/ | мълчеха /mɐɫˈtʃɛxə/ |

==== Third conjugation ====
Verbs from the third conjugation use no thematic vowel, the endings are added directly to the stem.

| Citation form | Stem | Past Imperfect | | | | | |
| Citation form | Stem | Singular | | | Plural | | |
| Citation form | Stem | 1st person | 2nd person | 3rd person | 1st person | 2nd person | 3rd person |
|---|---|---|---|---|---|---|---|
| искам /ˈiskəm/ | иска- /ˈiskə/ | исках /ˈiskəx/ | искаше /ˈiskəʃɛ/ | искаше /ˈiskəʃɛ/ | искахме /ˈiskəxmɛ/ | искахте /ˈiskəxt̪ɛ/ | искаха /ˈiskəxə/ |
| стрелям /ˈstrɛlʲəm/ | стреля- /ˈstrɛlʲə/ | стрелях /ˈstrɛlʲəx/ | стреляше /ˈstrɛlʲəʃɛ/ | стреляше /ˈstrɛlʲəʃɛ/ | стреляхме /ˈstrɛlʲəxmɛ/ | стреляхте /ˈstrɛlʲəxt̪ɛ/ | стреляха /ˈstrɛlʲəxə/ |

=== Past Aorist ===
In the first and second conjugation, verbs are additionally divided into classes according to the thematic vowel they use. In the third conjugation, verbs are divided into classes according to the final vowel of the stem.

==== Stress ====
Verbs with stress on the stem can keep it there or move it to the thematic vowel (or the final vowel of the stem in the case of the athematic third conjugation verbs). However, this shift can only happen if the verb is unprefixed or if it is imperfective. Forms with unshifted stress are usually typical for the eastern dialects and forms with shifted stress for the western dialects. However, the latter forms have become stylistically marked as dialectal and should be avoided and used only to distinguish otherwise homonymous forms.

Prefixed perfective verbs with stress on the stem do not change it.

Verbs with stress on the thematic vowel keep it there with the exception of first conjugation verbs of the first class and a few others.

==== First conjugation ====
===== First class =====
These verbs have the vowel о (/o̝/) or е (/ɛ/) in second and third person singular between the stem and the personal endings. The stems of these verbs end in д (/d̪/), т (/t̪/), с (/s/), з (/z/) and к (/k/). This class contains only 23 main verbs, which, however, are some of the most frequently used and there are hundreds of prefixed verbs formed from them:

бодá, (съ-)блекá, бъ́да*, (до-)ведá, влекá, дам*, до́йда*, кладá, крадá, (в-)ля́за, метá, (в-)несá, пасá, пекá, плетá, предá, растá*, рекá, секá, текá, тресá, четá, ям*

*These verbs are irregular but are considered part of the first class because in the aorist they behave just like the regular ones.

Although the stem of the verb тъка ends in к (/k/), it is not part of this class, it belongs to the next one.

An important feature of regular verbs from the first class is that the stress always moves on the last syllable of the stem (unless it is already there). This stress position is kept in the past active aorist participle, the past passive participle and the verbal noun.

| Citation form | Stem | Past Aorist | | | | | |
| Citation form | Stem | Singular | | | Plural | | |
| Citation form | Stem | 1st person | 2nd person | 3rd person | 1st person | 2nd person | 3rd person |
|---|---|---|---|---|---|---|---|
| крада /krɐˈd̪ɤ/ | крад- /krad̪/ | крадох /ˈkrad̪o̝x/ | краде /ˈkrad̪ɛ/ | краде /ˈkrad̪ɛ/ | крадохме /ˈkrad̪o̝xmɛ/ | крадохте /ˈkrad̪o̝xt̪ɛ/ | крадоха /ˈkrad̪o̝xə/ |
| чета /tʃɛˈt̪ɤ/ | чет- /tʃɛt̪/ | четох /ˈtʃɛt̪o̝x/ | чете /ˈtʃɛt̪ɛ/ | чете /ˈtʃɛt̪ɛ/ | четохме /ˈtʃɛt̪o̝xmɛ/ | четохте /ˈtʃɛt̪o̝xt̪ɛ/ | четоха /ˈtʃɛt̪o̝xə/ |
| треса /t̪rɛˈsɤ/ | трес- /t̪rɛs/ | тресох /ˈt̪rɛso̝x/ | тресе /ˈt̪rɛsɛ/ | тресе /ˈt̪rɛsɛ/ | тресохме /ˈt̪rɛso̝xmɛ/ | тресохте /ˈt̪rɛso̝xt̪ɛ/ | тресоха /ˈt̪rɛso̝xə/ |
| пека /pɛˈkɤ/ | пек- /pɛk/ | пекох /ˈpɛko̝x/ | пече* /ˈpɛtʃɛ/ | пече* /ˈpɛtʃɛ/ | пекохме /ˈpɛko̝xmɛ/ | пекохте /ˈpɛko̝xt̪ɛ/ | пекоха /ˈpɛko̝xə/ |

* The consonant к (/k/) changes to ч (/tʃ/) before the front vowel е (/ɛ/).

The verbs (съ-)блекá, влекá, (в-)ля́за and секá have the old yat vowel in the stem, which alternates between я (/ja/) and е (/ɛ/) according to the pronunciation in the eastern dialects.

| Citation form | Stem | Past Aorist | | | | | |
| Citation form | Stem | Singular | | | Plural | | |
| Citation form | Stem | 1st person | 2nd person | 3rd person | 1st person | 2nd person | 3rd person |
|---|---|---|---|---|---|---|---|
| вляза /ˈvlʲazə/ | вляз- /ˈvlʲaz/ | влязох /ˈvlʲazo̝x/ | влезе /ˈvlɛzɛ/ | влезе /ˈvlɛzɛ/ | влязохме /ˈvlʲazo̝xmɛ/ | влязохте /ˈvlʲazo̝xt̪ɛ/ | влязоха /ˈvlʲazo̝xə/ |
| сека /sɛˈkɤ/ | сек- /sɛk/ | сякох /ˈsʲako̝x/ | сече /ˈsɛtʃɛ/ | сече /ˈsɛtʃɛ/ | сякохме /ˈsʲako̝xmɛ/ | сякохте /ˈsʲako̝xt̪ɛ/ | сякоха /ˈsʲako̝xə/ |

===== Second class =====
These verbs use the thematic vowel а (/a/ or /ə/) between the stem and the personal endings. The stems of these verbs end in a consonant different from ж /ʒ/, ч /tʃ/, ш /ʃ/, д (/d̪/), т (/t̪/), с (/s/), з (/z/) or к (/k/), and their citation forms end in а. This class contains over 400 main verbs.

| Citation form | Stem | Past Aorist | | | | | |
| Citation form | Stem | Singular | | | Plural | | |
| Citation form | Stem | 1st person | 2nd person | 3rd person | 1st person | 2nd person | 3rd person |
|---|---|---|---|---|---|---|---|
| легна /ˈlɛɡnə/ | легн- /ˈlɛɡn/ | легнах /ˈlɛɡnəx/ /lɛɡˈnax/* | легна /ˈlɛɡnə/ /lɛɡˈna/* | легна /ˈlɛɡnə/ /lɛɡˈna/* | легнахме /ˈlɛɡnəxmɛ/ /lɛɡˈnaxmɛ/* | легнахте /ˈlɛɡnəxt̪ɛ/ /lɛɡˈnaxt̪ɛ/* | легнаха /ˈlɛɡnəxə/ /lɛɡˈnaxə/* |
| рева /rɛˈvɤ/ | рев- /rɛv/ | ревах /rɛˈvax/ | рева /rɛˈva/ | рева /rɛˈva/ | ревахме /rɛˈvaxmɛ/ | ревахте /rɛˈvaxt̪ɛ/ | реваха /rɛˈvaxə/ |

* Notice the stress shift as mentioned above.

Stems ending in -ер (/ɛr/), such as бера, пера and дера, lose the е (/ɛ/):

| Citation form | Stem | Past Aorist | | | | | |
| Citation form | Stem | Singular | | | Plural | | |
| Citation form | Stem | 1st person | 2nd person | 3rd person | 1st person | 2nd person | 3rd person |
|---|---|---|---|---|---|---|---|
| пера /pɛˈrɤ/ | пер- /pɛr/ | прах /prax/ | пра /pra/ | пра /pra/ | прахме /ˈpraxmɛ/ | прахте /ˈpraxt̪ɛ/ | праха /ˈpraxə/ |

In the verbs греба and гриза the stress moves to the stem. This is so because they used to belong to the first class.

| Citation form | Stem | Past Aorist | | | | | |
| Citation form | Stem | Singular | | | Plural | | |
| Citation form | Stem | 1st person | 2nd person | 3rd person | 1st person | 2nd person | 3rd person |
|---|---|---|---|---|---|---|---|
| греба /ɡrɛˈbɤ/ | греб- /ɡrɛb/ | гребах /ˈɡrɛbəx/ | греба /ˈɡrɛbə/ | греба /ˈɡrɛbə/ | гребахме /ˈɡrɛbəxmɛ/ | гребахте /ˈɡrɛbəxt̪ɛ/ | гребаха /ˈɡrɛbəxə/ |
| гриза /ɡriˈzɤ/ | гриз- /ɡriz/ | гризах /ˈɡrizəx/ | гриза /ˈɡrizə/ | гриза /ˈɡrizə/ | гризахме /ˈɡrizəxmɛ/ | гризахте /ˈɡrizəxt̪ɛ/ | гризаха /ˈɡrizəxə/ |

===== Third class =====
These verbs also use the thematic vowel а (/a/ or /ə/). This class is almost identical to the previous one, the only difference is that the citation form ends in я. It contains 23 main verbs:

бъ́бля*, бъ́бря*, бъ́хтя*, дре́мя, дъ́дря*, зо́бя*, ка́пя, кле́пя*, къ́кря*, къ́пя, мъ́мля*, мъ́мря*, пъ́пля*, си́пя, ску́бя, трепе́ря*, тре́пя, тъ́тря*, фъ́фля*, ха́пя, хъ́хря*, цъ́цря*, щипя

* These verbs have moved to the first class of the second conjugation due to analogy. First-conjugation forms can still be found, but are considered old-fashioned.

| Citation form | Stem | Past Aorist | | | | | |
| Citation form | Stem | Singular | | | Plural | | |
| Citation form | Stem | 1st person | 2nd person | 3rd person | 1st person | 2nd person | 3rd person |
|---|---|---|---|---|---|---|---|
| къпя /ˈkɤpʲə/ | къп- /ˈkɤp/ | къпах /ˈkɤpəx/ /kɐˈpax/* | къпа /ˈkɤpə/ /kɐˈpa/* | къпа /ˈkɤpə/ /kɐˈpa/* | къпахме /ˈkɤpəxmɛ/ /kɐˈpaxmɛ/* | къпахте /ˈkɤpəxt̪ɛ/ /kɐˈpaxt̪ɛ/* | къпаха /ˈkɤpəxə/ /kɐˈpaxə/* |
| треперя /t̪rɛˈpɛrʲə/ | трепер- /t̪rɛˈpɛr/ | треперах /t̪rɛˈpɛrəx/ /t̪rɛpɛˈrax/* | трепера /t̪rɛˈpɛrə/ /t̪rɛpɛˈra/* | трепера /t̪rɛˈpɛrə/ /t̪rɛpɛˈra/* | треперахме /t̪rɛˈpɛrəxmɛ/ /t̪rɛpɛˈraxmɛ/* | треперахте /t̪rɛˈpɛrəxt̪ɛ/ /t̪rɛpɛˈraxt̪ɛ/* | трепераха /t̪rɛˈpɛrəxə/ /t̪rɛpɛˈraxə/* |

* Notice the stress shift as mentioned above.

The verb дремя contains the yat vowel which alternates between я (/ja/) and е (/ɛ/):

| Citation form | Stem | Past Aorist | | | | | |
| Citation form | Stem | Singular | | | Plural | | |
| Citation form | Stem | 1st person | 2nd person | 3rd person | 1st person | 2nd person | 3rd person |
|---|---|---|---|---|---|---|---|
| дремя /ˈd̪rɛmʲə/ | дрем- /ˈd̪rɛm/ | дрямах /ˈd̪rʲaməx/ дремах /d̪rɛˈmax/ | дряма /ˈd̪rʲamə/ дрема /d̪rɛˈma/ | дряма /ˈd̪rʲamə/ дрема /d̪rɛˈma/ | дрямахме /ˈd̪rʲaməxmɛ/ дремахме /d̪rɛˈmaxmɛ/ | дрямахте /ˈd̪rʲaməxt̪ɛ/ дремахте /d̪rɛˈmaxt̪ɛ/ | дрямаха /ˈd̪rʲaməxə/ дремаха /d̪rɛˈmaxə/ |

===== Fourth class =====
These verbs use the vowel а (/a/ or /ə/) between the stem and the personal endings. The stems of these verbs end in one of the consonants ж /ʒ/, ч /tʃ/ or ш /ʃ/, which in the aorist change to з/г (/z,g/), k (/k/) and с (/s/) respectively. This class contains 27 main verbs:

Change from /ʒ/ to /z/: бли́жа, въ́ржа, ка́жа, ли́жа, ма́жа, ни́жа, ре́жа, хари́жа
Change from /ʒ/ to /g/: лъ́жа, стри́жа, стъ́ржа
Change from /tʃ/ to /k/: ба́уча, дъ́вча, мя́уча, пла́ча, сму́ча, су́ча, тъ́пча
Change from /ʃ/ to /s/: бри́ша, бъ́рша, мири́ша, (о-)па́ша, пи́ша, ре́ша*, уйди́ша, уйдурди́ша, че́ша

* реша also belongs to the second conjugation.

| Citation form | Stem | Past Aorist | | | | | |
| Citation form | Stem | Singular | | | Plural | | |
| Citation form | Stem | 1st person | 2nd person | 3rd person | 1st person | 2nd person | 3rd person |
|---|---|---|---|---|---|---|---|
| кажа /ˈkaʒə/ | каж- /ˈkaʒ/ | казах /ˈkazəx/ /kɐˈzax/* | каза /ˈkazə/ /kɐˈza/* | каза /ˈkazə/ /kɐˈza/* | казахме /ˈkazəxmɛ/ /kɐˈzaxmɛ/* | казахте /ˈkazəxt̪ɛ/ /kɐˈzaxt̪ɛ/* | казаха /ˈkazəxə/ /kɐˈzaxə/ |
| лъжа /ˈɫɤʒə/ | лъж- /ˈɫɤʒ/ | лъгах /ˈɫɤɡəx/ /ɫɐˈɡax/* | лъга /ˈɫɤɡə/ /ɫɐˈɡa/* | лъга /ˈɫɤɡə/ /ɫɐˈɡa/* | лъгахме /ˈɫɤɡəxmɛ/ /ɫɐˈɡaxmɛ/* | лъгахте /ˈɫɤɡəxt̪ɛ/ /ɫɐˈɡaxt̪ɛ/* | лъгаха /ˈɫɤɡəxə/ /ɫɐˈɡaxə/ |
| плача /ˈpɫatʃə/ | плач- /ˈpɫatʃ/ | плаках /ˈpɫakəx/ /pɫɐˈkax/* | плака /ˈpɫakə/ /pɫɐˈka/* | плака /ˈpɫakə/ /pɫɐˈka/* | плакахме /ˈpɫakəxmɛ/ /pɫɐˈkaxmɛ/* | плакахте /ˈpɫakəxt̪ɛ/ /pɫɐˈkaxt̪ɛ/* | плакаха /ˈpɫakəxə/ /pɫɐˈkaxə/ |
| пиша /ˈpiʃə/ | пиш- /ˈpiʃ/ | писах /ˈpisəx/ /piˈsax/* | писа /ˈpisə/ /piˈsa/* | писа /ˈpisə/ /piˈsa/* | писахме /ˈpisəxmɛ/ /piˈsaxmɛ/* | писахте /ˈpisəxt̪ɛ/ /piˈsaxt̪ɛ/* | писаха /ˈpisəxə/ /piˈsaxə/ |

* Notice the stress shift as mentioned above.

The verb режа has the yat vowel, which alternates between я (/ja/) and е (/ɛ/).

| Citation form | Stem | Past Aorist | | | | | |
| Citation form | Stem | Singular | | | Plural | | |
| Citation form | Stem | 1st person | 2nd person | 3rd person | 1st person | 2nd person | 3rd person |
|---|---|---|---|---|---|---|---|
| режа /ˈrɛʒə/ | реж- /ˈrɛʒ/ | рязах /ˈrʲazəx/ резах /rɛˈzax/ | ряза /ˈrʲazə/ реза /rɛˈza/ | ряза /ˈrʲazə/ реза /rɛˈza/ | рязахме /ˈrʲazəxmɛ/ резахме /rɛˈzaxmɛ/ | рязахте /ˈrʲazəxt̪ɛ/ резахте /rɛˈzaxt̪ɛ/ | рязаха /ˈrʲazəxə/ резаха /rɛˈzaxə/ |

The verbs глождя (глозгах), дращя (драсках) and пощя (посках) used to belong to this class but now have completely migrated to the second conjugation.

===== Fifth class =====
This class uses the yat vowel between the stem and the personal endings. It is consistently pronounced as я (/ja/) in all forms. The stems of these verbs end in a consonant + р (/r/), except for the defective verb ща. This is the smallest class, containing only 6 main verbs:

вра, зра, мра, (с-)пра́, простра́, ща

| Citation form | Stem | Past Aorist | | | | | |
| Citation form | Stem | Singular | | | Plural | | |
| Citation form | Stem | 1st person | 2nd person | 3rd person | 1st person | 2nd person | 3rd person |
|---|---|---|---|---|---|---|---|
| спра /sprɤ/ | спр- /spr/ | спрях /sprʲax/ | спря /sprʲa/ | спря /sprʲa/ | спряхме /ˈsprʲaxmɛ/ | спряхте /ˈsprʲaxt̪ɛ/ | спряха /ˈsprʲaxə/ |
| простра /proˈst̪rɤ/ | простр- /prost̪r/ | прострях /proˈst̪rʲax/ | простря /proˈst̪rʲa/ | простря /proˈst̪rʲa/ | простряхме /ˈproˈst̪rʲaxmɛ/ | простряхте /ˈproˈst̪rʲaxt̪ɛ/ | простряха /ˈproˈst̪rʲaxə/ |

===== Sixth class =====
This class uses the thematic vowel я (/ja/ or /jə/). The class contains a small number of verbs, whose stems end in the vowels а (/a/) or е (/ɛ/):

але́я, ба́я, бле́я, ва́я, ве́я, зе́я, зна́я*, ка́я се, (на-)кле́я, кре́я, ла́я, ма́я се, наде́я се, неха́я, отча́я се, ре́я се, тра́я, шля́я се

* Verbs derived from зная by prefixation belong to the seventh class.

Some verbs belong both to this and to the next class. Some examples are: вея, блея, рея, шляя се, etc.

| Citation form | Stem | Past Aorist | | | | | |
| Citation form | Stem | Singular | | | Plural | | |
| Citation form | Stem | 1st person | 2nd person | 3rd person | 1st person | 2nd person | 3rd person |
|---|---|---|---|---|---|---|---|
| зея /ˈzɛjə/ | зе- /zɛ/ | зеях /ˈzɛjəx/ /zɛˈjax/* | зея /ˈzɛjə/ /zɛˈja/* | зея /ˈzɛjə/ /zɛˈja/* | зеяхме /ˈzɛjəxmɛ/ /zɛˈjaxmɛ/* | зеяхте /ˈzɛjəxt̪ɛ/ /zɛˈjaxt̪ɛ/* | зеяха /ˈzɛjəxə/ /zɛˈjaxə/ |
| трая /ˈt̪rajə/ | тра- /t̪ra/ | траях /ˈt̪rajəx/ /t̪rɐˈjax/* | трая /ˈt̪rajə/ /t̪rɐˈja/* | трая /ˈt̪rajə/ /t̪rɐˈja/* | траяхме /ˈt̪rajəxmɛ/ /t̪rɐˈjaxmɛ/* | траяхте /ˈt̪rajəxt̪ɛ/ /t̪rɐˈjaxt̪ɛ/* | траяха /ˈt̪rajəxə/ /t̪rɐˈjaxə/ |

* Notice the stress shift as mentioned above.

===== Seventh class =====
These verbs do not use any thematic vowel. The personal endings are added directly to the stem, which almost always ends in a vowel, either а (/a/), я (/ja/), е (/ɛ/), и (/i/), у (/u/) or ю (/ju/). This class contains over 250 main verbs, some of which are:

Stems in /a/ or /ja/ : веща́я, вита́я, влия́я, гада́я, жела́я, (по-)зна́я, игра́я, копа́я, мечта́я, обеща́я, сия́я, скуча́я, четра́я, etc.
Stems in /ɛ/ : венче́я, възмъже́я, върше́я, гре́я, дебеле́я, живе́я, ле́я, пе́я, се́я, тъмне́я, etc.
Stems in /i/ (only 9 main verbs) : би́я, ви́я, гни́я, кри́я, ми́я, пи́я, ри́я, три́я, ши́я.
Stems in /u/ or /ju/ (only 6 main verbs) : (на-)ду́я, плу́я, плю́я, (об-)у́я, (на-)хлу́я, чу́я.

All stems ending in /ɛ/ actually end in the old yat vowel which is pronounced as я (/ja/) or а (/a/) after /ʒ/, /tʃ/ and /ʃ/ in all aorist forms.

| Citation form | Stem | Past Aorist | | | | | |
| Citation form | Stem | Singular | | | Plural | | |
| Citation form | Stem | 1st person | 2nd person | 3rd person | 1st person | 2nd person | 3rd person |
|---|---|---|---|---|---|---|---|
| играя /iˈɡrajə/ | игра- /iˈɡra/ | играх /iˈɡrax/ | игра /iˈɡra/ | игра /iˈɡra/ | играхме /iˈɡraxmɛ/ | играхте /iˈɡraxt̪ɛ/ | играха /iˈɡraxə/ |
| пея /ˈpɛjə/ | пе- /ˈpɛ/ | пях /pʲax/ | пя /pʲa/ | пя /pʲa/ | пяхме /ˈpʲaxmɛ/ | пяхте /ˈpʲaxt̪ɛ/ | пяха /ˈpʲaxə/ |
| вършея /vɐrˈʃɛjə/ | върше- /vɐrˈʃɛ/ | вършах /vɐrˈʃax/ | върша /vɐrˈʃa/ | върша /vɐrˈʃa/ | вършахме /vɐrˈʃaxmɛ/ | вършахте /vɐrˈʃaxt̪ɛ/ | вършаха /vɐrˈʃaxə/ |
| пия /ˈpijə/ | пи- /pi/ | пих /pix/ | пи /pi/ | пи /pi/ | пихме /ˈpixmɛ/ | пихте /ˈpixt̪ɛ/ | пиха /ˈpixə/ |
| чуя /ˈtʃujə/ | чу- /tʃu/ | чух /tʃux/ | чу /tʃu/ | чу /tʃu/ | чухме /ˈtʃuxmɛ/ | чухте /ˈtʃuxt̪ɛ/ | чуха /ˈtʃuxə/ |

Stems ending in -ем (/ɛm/) are also considered to belong in this class since they do not use a thematic vowel. They are a special case because the stem loses the м (/m/) before adding the personal endings.

| Citation form | Stem | Past Aorist | | | | | |
| Citation form | Stem | Singular | | | Plural | | |
| Citation form | Stem | 1st person | 2nd person | 3rd person | 1st person | 2nd person | 3rd person |
|---|---|---|---|---|---|---|---|
| взема /ˈvzɛmə/ | взем- /vzɛm/ | взех /vzɛx/ | взе /vzɛ/ | взе /vzɛ/ | взехме /ˈvzɛxmɛ/ | взехте /ˈvzɛxt̪ɛ/ | взеха /ˈvzɛxə/ |
| наема /nɐˈɛmə/ | наем- /nɐˈɛm/ | наех /nɐˈɛx/ | нае /nɐˈɛ/ | нае /nɐˈɛ/ | наехме /nɐˈɛxmɛ/ | наехте /nɐˈɛxt̪ɛ/ | наеха /nɐˈɛxə/ |

==== Second conjugation ====
===== First class =====
These verbs use the vowel и (/i/) between the stem and the personal endings. There are both stems ending in a consonant and stems ending in a vowel. The vast majority of the verbs from second conjugation belong to this class.

| Citation form | Stem | Past Aorist | | | | | |
| Citation form | Stem | Singular | | | Plural | | |
| Citation form | Stem | 1st person | 2nd person | 3rd person | 1st person | 2nd person | 3rd person |
|---|---|---|---|---|---|---|---|
| платя /pɫɐˈtʲɤ/ | плат- /pɫɐt̪/ | платих /pɫɐˈt̪ix/ | плати /pɫɐˈt̪i/ | плати /pɫɐˈt̪i/ | платихме /pɫɐˈt̪ixmɛ/ | платихте /pɫɐˈt̪ixt̪ɛ/ | платиха /pɫɐˈt̪ixə/ |
| говоря /ɡoˈvɔrʲə/ | говор- /ɡoˈvɔɾ/ | говорих /ɡoˈvɔɾix/ /ɡo̝voˈɾix/* | говори /ɡoˈvɔɾi/ /ɡo̝voˈɾi/* | говори /ɡoˈvɔɾi/ /ɡo̝voˈɾi/* | говорихме /ɡoˈvɔɾixmɛ/ /ɡo̝voˈɾixmɛ/* | говорихте /ɡoˈvɔɾixt̪ɛ/ /ɡo̝voˈɾixt̪ɛ/* | говориха /ɡoˈvɔɾixə/ /ɡo̝voˈɾixə/* |
| строя /st̪roˈjɤ/ | стро- /st̪ro/ | строих /st̪roˈix/ | строи /st̪roˈi/ | строи /st̪roˈi/ | строихме /st̪roˈixmɛ/ | строихте /st̪roˈixt̪ɛ/ | строиха /st̪roˈixə/ |
| реша /rɛˈʃɤ/ | реш- /rɛʃ/ | реших /rɛˈʃix/ | реши /rɛˈʃi/ | реши /rɛˈʃi/ | решихме /rɛˈʃixmɛ/ | решихте /rɛˈʃixt̪ɛ/ | решиха /rɛˈʃixə/ |
| движа /ˈd̪viʒə/ | движ- /d̪viʒ/ | движих /ˈd̪viʒix/ /d̪viˈʒix/* | движи /ˈd̪viʒi/ /d̪viˈʒi/* | движи /ˈd̪viʒi/ /d̪viˈʒi/* | движихме /ˈd̪viʒixmɛ/ /d̪viˈʒixmɛ/* | движихте /ˈd̪viʒixt̪ɛ/ /d̪viˈʒixt̪ɛ/* | движиха /ˈd̪viʒixə/ /d̪viˈʒixə/* |

* Notice the double stress pattern as mentioned above.

===== Second class =====
These verbs use the old yat vowel between the stem and the personal endings. It is consistently pronounces as я (/ja/) in all forms. The majority of the stems end in a consonant (different from ж /ʒ/, ч /tʃ/ or ш /ʃ/) but there a few ending in a vowel. These verbs are characterized by the fact that the stress always falls on the thematic vowel across all forms, not exclusively in the aorist. This class contains 76 main verbs.

| Citation form | Stem | Past Aorist | | | | | |
| Citation form | Stem | Singular | | | Plural | | |
| Citation form | Stem | 1st person | 2nd person | 3rd person | 1st person | 2nd person | 3rd person |
|---|---|---|---|---|---|---|---|
| вървя /vɐrˈvʲɤ/ | върв- /vɐrv/ | вървях /vɐrˈvʲax/ | вървя /vɐrˈvʲa/ | вървя /vɐrˈvʲa/ | вървяхме /vɐrˈvʲaxmɛ/ | вървяхте /vɐrˈvʲaxt̪ɛ/ | вървяха /vɐrˈvʲaxə/ |
| стоя /st̪oˈjɤ/ | сто- /st̪o/ | стоях /st̪oˈjax/ | стоя /st̪oˈja/ | стоя /st̪oˈja/ | стояхме /st̪oˈjaxmɛ/ | стояхте /st̪oˈjaxt̪ɛ/ | стояха /st̪oˈjaxə/ |

===== Third class =====
These verbs use the vowel а (/a/) between the personal endings and the stem, which always ends in ж /ʒ/ or ч /tʃ/. The stress is always on the thematic vowel in all forms, just as in the previous class. The class contains 27 main verbs:

бръмча́, буча́, гълча́, гъмжа́, дрънча́, държа́, еча́, жужа́, журча́, звуча́, квича́, клеча́, лежа́, лича́, мижа́, муча́, мълча́, руча́, ръмжа́, стърча́, тежа́, търча́, фуча́, хвърча́, хуча́, цвърча́.

| Citation form | Stem | Past Aorist | | | | | |
| Citation form | Stem | Singular | | | Plural | | |
| Citation form | Stem | 1st person | 2nd person | 3rd person | 1st person | 2nd person | 3rd person |
|---|---|---|---|---|---|---|---|
| лежа /lɛˈʒɤ/ | леж- /lɛʒ/ | лежах /lɛˈʒax/ | лежа /lɛˈʒa/ | лежа /lɛˈʒa/ | лежахме /lɛˈʒaxmɛ/ | лежахте /lɛˈʒaxt̪ɛ/ | лежаха /lɛˈʒaxɐ/ |
| мълч /mɐɫˈtʃɤ/ | мълч- /mɐɫtʃ/ | мълчах /mɐɫˈtʃax/ | мълча /mɐɫˈtʃa/ | мълча /mɐɫˈtʃa/ | мълчахме /mɐɫˈtʃaxmɛ/ | мълчахте /mɐɫˈtʃaxt̪ɛ/ | мълчаха /mɐɫˈtʃaxɐ/ |

==== Third conjugation ====
All verbs conjugate in the same fashion (without a thematic vowel, simply by adding the personal endings directly to the stem), nevertheless, Bulgarian grammar books divide them into two classes, depending on the final vowel of the stem.

===== First class =====
These are stems ending in а (/a/). The vast majority of third conjugation verbs belong to this class.

| Citation form | Stem | Past Aorist | | | | | |
| Citation form | Stem | Singular | | | Plural | | |
| Citation form | Stem | 1st person | 2nd person | 3rd person | 1st person | 2nd person | 3rd person |
|---|---|---|---|---|---|---|---|
| гледам /ˈɡlɛd̪əm/ | гледа- /ˈɡlɛd̪ə/ | гледах /ˈɡlɛd̪əx/ /ɡlɛˈd̪ax/* | гледа /ˈɡlɛd̪ə/ /ɡlɛˈd̪a/* | гледа /ˈɡlɛd̪ə/ /ɡlɛˈd̪a/* | гледахме /ˈɡlɛd̪əxmɛ/ /ɡlɛˈd̪axmɛ/* | гледахте /ˈɡlɛd̪əxt̪ɛ/ /ɡlɛˈd̪axt̪ɛ/* | гледаха /ˈɡlɛd̪əxə/ /ɡlɛˈd̪axə/* |
| искам /ˈiskəm/ | иска- /ˈiskə/ | исках /ˈiskəx/ /isˈkax/* | иска /ˈiskə/ /isˈka/* | иска /ˈiskə/ /isˈka/* | искахме /ˈiskəxmɛ/ /isˈkaxmɛ/* | искахте /ˈiskəxt̪ɛ/ /isˈkaxt̪ɛ/* | искаха /ˈiskəxə/ /isˈkaxə/* |

* Notice the stress shift as explained above.

===== Second class =====
The stems of these verbs end in я (/ja/). This class is much smaller compared to the first one.

| Citation form | Stem | Past Aorist | | | | | |
| Citation form | Stem | Singular | | | Plural | | |
| Citation form | Stem | 1st person | 2nd person | 3rd person | 1st person | 2nd person | 3rd person |
|---|---|---|---|---|---|---|---|
| вечерям /vɛˈtʃɛrʲəm/ | вечеря- /vɛˈtʃɛrʲə/ | вечерях /vɛˈtʃɛrʲəx/ /vɛtʃɛˈrʲax/* | вечеря /vɛˈtʃɛrʲə/ /vɛtʃɛˈrʲa/* | вечеря /vɛˈtʃɛrʲə/ /vɛtʃɛˈrʲa/* | вечеряхме /vɛˈtʃɛrʲəxmɛ/ /vɛtʃɛˈrʲaxmɛ/* | вечеряхте /vɛˈtʃɛrʲəxt̪ɛ/ /vɛtʃɛˈrʲaxt̪ɛ/* | вечеряха /vɛˈtʃɛrʲəxə/ /vɛtʃɛˈrʲaxə/* |
| стрелям /ˈst̪rɛlʲəm/ | стреля- /ˈst̪rɛlʲə/ | стрелях /ˈst̪rɛlʲəx/ /st̪rɛˈlʲax/* | стреля /ˈst̪rɛlʲə/ /st̪rɛˈlʲa/* | стреля /ˈst̪rɛlʲə/ /st̪rɛˈlʲa/* | стреляхме /ˈst̪rɛlʲəxmɛ/ /st̪rɛˈlʲaxmɛ/* | стреляхте /ˈst̪rɛlʲəxt̪ɛ/ /st̪rɛˈlʲaxt̪ɛ/* | стреляха /ˈst̪rɛlʲəxə/ /st̪rɛˈlʲaxə/* |

* Notice the stress shift as explained above.

=== Imperative mood ===
Inflected imperative forms exist only for the second person. The other persons use periphrastic constructions. All regular verbs, regardless of conjugation, form the imperative mood in the same way:

- Stems ending in a vowel (which include all third-conjugation verbs) use the thematic (semi)vowel й (/j/) between the stem and the personal endings. These verbs usually do not have a stress shift, they keep the stress of the present tense, unless it is on the thematic vowel, in which case it moves on the preceding syllable, since /j/ is not a vowel and cannot be stressed.
- Stems ending in a consonant use the thematic vowel и (/i/) in the singular form and the vowel е (/ɛ/) in the plural form. The stress is always on the thematic vowel.

| Conjugation | Citation form | Stem | Imperative mood | |
| Conjugation | Citation form | Stem | Second person | |
| Conjugation | Citation form | Stem | Singular | Plural |
|---|---|---|---|---|
| First | пиша /ˈpiʃə/ | пиш- /piʃ/ | пиши /piˈʃi/ | пишете /piˈʃɛt̪ɛ/ |
| First | пея /ˈpɛjə/ | пе- /pɛ/ | пей /pɛj/ | пейте /ˈpɛjt̪ɛ/ |
| Second | говоря /ɡoˈvɔrʲə/ | говор- /ɡoˈvɔr/ | говори /ɡo̝voˈri/ | говорете /ɡo̝voˈrɛt̪ɛ/ |
| Second | стоя /st̪oˈjɤ/ | сто- /st̪o/ | стой /st̪ɔj/ | стойте /ˈst̪ɔjt̪ɛ/ |
| Third | искам /ˈiskəm/ | иска- /ˈiskə/ | искай /ˈiskəj/ | искайте /ˈiskəjt̪ɛ/ |
| Third | стрелям /ˈstrɛlʲəm/ | стреля- /ˈstrɛlʲə/ | стреляй /ˈstrɛlʲəj/ | стреляйте /ˈstrɛlʲəjt̪ɛ/ |

Some verbs, most notably stems ending in з (/z/) from the first class of the first conjugation, and a few other frequently used ones, use only the bare stem without a thematic vowel:

| Citation form | Stem | Imperative mood | |
| Citation form | Stem | Second person | |
| Citation form | Stem | Singular | Plural |
|---|---|---|---|
| вляза /ˈvlʲazə/ | вляз- /vlʲaz/ | влез* /vlɛs/ | влезте* /ˈvlɛst̪ɛ/ |
| държа /d̪ɐrˈʒɤ/ | държ- /d̪ɐrʒ/ | дръж /d̪rɤʃ/ | дръжте /ˈd̪rɤʃt̪ɛ/ |

* The yat vowel changes to е (/ɛ/).

== Non-finite forms ==
=== Present Active Participle ===
Only imperfective verbs have a present active participle. It is formed from the first-person-singular-past-imperfect form of the verb by removing the final х (/x/) and adding щ (/ʃt̪/). It is inflected as a regular adjective (see the endings).

| 1st person singular past imperfect | Present Active Participle | | | | | | | | |
| 1st person singular past imperfect | Indefinite | | | | Definite | | | | |
| 1st person singular past imperfect | Masculine | Feminine | Neuter | Plural | Masculine subject form | Masculine object form | Feminine | Neuter | Plural |
|---|---|---|---|---|---|---|---|---|---|
| четях /tʃɛˈt̪ʲax/ | четящ /tʃɛˈt̪ʲaʃt̪/ | четяща /tʃɛˈt̪ʲaʃt̪ə/ | четящо /tʃɛˈt̪ʲaʃt̪o̝/ | четящи* /tʃɛˈt̪ʲaʃt̪i/ | четящият* /tʃɛˈt̪ʲaʃt̪ijət̪/ | четящия* /tʃɛˈt̪ʲaʃt̪ijə/ | четящата /tʃɛˈt̪ʲaʃt̪ət̪ə/ | четящото /tʃɛˈt̪ʲaʃt̪o̝t̪o̝/ | четящите* /tʃɛˈt̪ʲaʃt̪it̪ɛ/ |
| говорех /ɡoˈvɔrɛx/ | говорещ /ɡoˈvɔrɛʃt̪/ | говореща /ɡoˈvɔrɛʃt̪ə/ | говорещо /ɡoˈvɔrɛʃt̪o̝/ | говорещи /ɡoˈvɔrɛʃt̪i/ | говорещият /ɡoˈvɔrɛʃt̪ijət̪/ | говорещия /ɡoˈvɔrɛʃt̪ijə/ | говорещата /ɡoˈvɔrɛʃt̪ət̪ə/ | говорещото /ɡoˈvɔrɛʃt̪o̝t̪o̝/ | говорещите /ɡoˈvɔrɛʃt̪it̪ɛ/ |
| печах /pɛˈtʃax/ печех /pɛˈtʃɛx/ | печащ /pɛˈtʃaʃt̪/ печещ /pɛˈtʃɛʃt̪/ | печаща /pɛˈtʃaʃt̪ə/ печеща /pɛˈtʃɛʃt̪ə/ | печащо /pɛˈtʃaʃt̪o̝/ печещо /pɛˈtʃɛʃt̪o̝/ | печащи* /pɛˈtʃaʃt̪i/ печещи /pɛˈtʃɛʃt̪i/ | печащият* /pɛˈtʃaʃt̪ijət̪/ печещият /pɛˈtʃɛʃt̪ijət̪/ | печащия* /pɛˈtʃaʃt̪ijə/ печещия /pɛˈtʃɛʃt̪ijə/ | печащата /pɛˈtʃaʃt̪ət̪ə/ печещата /pɛˈtʃɛʃt̪ət̪ə/ | печащото /pɛˈtʃaʃt̪o̝t̪o̝/ печещото /pɛˈtʃɛʃt̪o̝t̪o̝/ | печащите* /pɛˈtʃaʃt̪it̪ɛ/ печещите /pɛˈtʃɛʃt̪it̪ɛ/ |
| исках /ˈiskəx/ | искащ /ˈiskəʃt̪/ | искаща /ˈiskəʃt̪ə/ | искащо /ˈiskəʃt̪o̝/ | искащи /ˈiskəʃt̪i/ | искащият /ˈiskəʃt̪ijət̪/ | искащия /ˈiskəʃt̪ijə/ | искащата /ˈiskəʃt̪ət̪ə/ | искащото /ˈiskəʃt̪o̝t̪o̝/ | искащите /ˈiskəʃt̪it̪ɛ/ |

* Although the yat vowel is followed by a syllable containing и (/i/), it is not pronounced as е (/ɛ/).

=== Past Active Aorist Participle ===
It is formed from the first-person-singular-past-aorist form of the verb by removing the final х (/x/) and adding л (/ɫ/), after that it is inflected as an adjective (see the endings). Only verbs from the first class of the first conjugation form it somewhat differently: the thematic vowel о (/o̝/) is removed and the л (/ɫ/) is added directly to the stem with some additional changes, namely:

- Stems ending in д (/d̪/) and т (/t̪/) lose them;
- Stems ending in с (/s/), з (/z/) and к (/k/) have an epenthetic ъ (/ə/) between the stem and the л (/ɫ/) in the masculine indefinite form (it is absent in all the other forms).

The past active aorist participle keeps the stress of the past aorist, either shifted or not.

| Conjugation | Class | 1st person singular past aorist | Past Active Aorist Participle | | | | | | | | |
| Conjugation | Class | 1st person singular past aorist | Indefinite | | | | Definite | | | | |
| Conjugation | Class | 1st person singular past aorist | Masculine | Feminine | Neuter | Plural | Masculine subject form | Masculine object form | Feminine | Neuter | Plural |
|---|---|---|---|---|---|---|---|---|---|---|---|
| First | 1st | четох /ˈtʃɛt̪o̝x/ | чел /tʃɛɫ/ | чела /ˈtʃɛɫə/ | чело /ˈtʃɛɫo̝/ | чели /ˈtʃɛli/ | челият /ˈtʃɛlijət̪/ | челия /ˈtʃɛlijə/ | челата /ˈtʃɛɫət̪ə/ | челото /ˈtʃɛɫo̝t̪o̝/ | челите /ˈtʃɛlit̪ɛ/ |
| First | 1st | тресох /ˈt̪rɛso̝x/ | тресъл /ˈt̪rɛsəɫ/ | тресла /ˈt̪rɛsɫə/ | тресло /ˈt̪rɛsɫo̝/ | тресли /ˈt̪rɛsli/ | треслият /ˈt̪rɛslijət̪/ | треслия /ˈt̪rɛslijə/ | треслата /ˈt̪rɛsɫət̪ə/ | треслото /ˈt̪rɛsɫo̝t̪o̝/ | треслите /ˈt̪rɛslit̪ɛ/ |
| First | 1st | сякох /ˈsʲako̝x/ | сякъл /ˈsʲakəɫ/ | сякла /ˈsʲakɫə/ | сякло /ˈsʲakɫo̝/ | секли^{1} /ˈsɛkli/ | секлият^{1} /ˈsɛklijət̪/ | секлия^{1} /ˈsɛklijə/ | сяклата /ˈsʲakɫət̪ə/ | сяклото /ˈsʲakɫo̝t̪o̝/ | секлите^{1} /ˈsɛklit̪ɛ/ |
| First | 2nd | легнах /ˈlɛɡnəx/ /lɛɡˈnax/ | легнал /ˈlɛɡnəɫ/ /lɛɡˈnaɫ/ | легнала /ˈlɛɡnəɫə/ /lɛɡˈnaɫə/ | легнало /ˈlɛɡnəɫo̝/ /lɛɡˈnaɫo̝/ | легнали /ˈlɛɡnəli/ /lɛɡˈnali/ | легналият /ˈlɛɡnəlijət̪/ /lɛɡˈnalijət̪/ | легналия /ˈlɛɡnəlijə/ /lɛɡˈnalijə/ | легналата /ˈlɛɡnəɫət̪ə/ /lɛɡˈnaɫət̪ə/ | легналото /ˈlɛɡnəɫo̝t̪o̝/ /lɛɡˈnaɫo̝t̪o̝/ | легналите /ˈlɛɡnəlit̪ɛ/ /lɛɡˈnalit̪ɛ/ |
| First | 3rd | къпах /ˈkɤpəx/ /kɐˈpax/ | къпал /ˈkɤpəɫ/ /kɐˈpaɫ/ | къпала /ˈkɤpəɫə/ /kɐˈpaɫə/ | къпало /ˈkɤpəɫo̝/ /kɐˈpaɫo̝/ | къпали /ˈkɤpəli/ /kɐˈpali/ | къпалият /ˈkɤpəlijət̪/ /kɐˈpalijət̪/ | къпалия /ˈkɤpəlijə/ /kɐˈpalijə/ | къпалата /ˈkɤpəɫət̪ə/ /kɐˈpaɫət̪ə/ | къпалото /ˈkɤpəɫo̝t̪o̝/ /kɐˈpaɫo̝t̪o̝/ | къпалите /ˈkɤpəlit̪ɛ/ /kɐˈpalit̪ɛ/ |
| First | 4th | казах /ˈkazəx/ /kɐˈzax/ | казал /ˈkazəɫ/ /kɐˈzaɫ/ | казала /ˈkazəɫə/ /kɐˈzaɫə/ | казало /ˈkazəɫo̝/ /kɐˈzaɫo̝/ | казали /ˈkazəli/ /kɐˈzali/ | казалият /ˈkazəlijət̪/ /kɐˈzalijət̪/ | казалия /ˈkazəlijə/ /kɐˈzalijə/ | казалата /ˈkazəɫət̪ə/ /kɐˈzaɫət̪ə/ | казалото /ˈkazəɫo̝t̪o̝/ /kɐˈzaɫo̝t̪o̝/ | казалите /ˈkazəlit̪ɛ/ /kɐˈzalit̪ɛ/ |
| First | 5th | спрях /sprʲax/ | спрял /sprʲaɫ/ | спряла /ˈsprʲaɫə/ | спряло /ˈsprʲaɫo̝/ | спрели^{1} /ˈsprɛli/ | спрелият^{1} /ˈsprɛlijət̪/ | спрелия^{1} /ˈsprɛlijə/ | спрялата /ˈsprʲaɫət̪ə/ | спрялото /ˈsprʲaɫo̝t̪o̝/ | спрелите^{1} /ˈsprɛlit̪ɛ/ |
| First | 6th | траях /ˈt̪rajəx/ /t̪rɐˈjax/ | траял /ˈt̪rajəɫ/ /t̪rɐˈjaɫ/ | траяла /ˈt̪rajəɫə/ /t̪rɐˈjaɫə/ | траяло /ˈt̪rajəɫo̝/ /t̪rɐˈjaɫo̝/ | траяли /ˈt̪rajəli/ /t̪rɐˈjali/ | траялият /ˈt̪rajəlijət̪/ /t̪rɐˈjalijət̪/ | траялия /ˈt̪rajəlijə/ /t̪rɐˈjalijə/ | траялата /ˈt̪rajəɫət̪ə/ /t̪rɐˈjaɫət̪ə/ | траялото /ˈt̪rajəɫo̝t̪o̝/ /t̪rɐˈjaɫo̝t̪o̝/ | траялите /ˈt̪rajəlit̪ɛ/ /t̪rɐˈjalit̪ɛ/ |
| First | 7th | играх /iˈɡrax/ | играл /iˈɡraɫ/ | играла /iˈɡraɫə/ | играло /iˈɡraɫo̝/ | играли /iˈɡrali/ | игралият /iˈɡralijət̪/ | игралия /iˈɡralijə/ | игралата /iˈɡraɫət̪ə/ | игралото /iˈɡraɫo̝t̪o̝/ | игралите /iˈɡralit̪ɛ/ |
| First | 7th | пях /pʲax/ | пял /pʲaɫ/ | пяла /ˈpʲaɫə/ | пяло /ˈpʲaɫo̝/ | пели^{1} /ˈpɛli/ | пелият^{1} /ˈpɛlijət̪/ | пелия^{1} /ˈpɛlijə/ | пялата /ˈpʲaɫət̪ə/ | пялото /ˈpʲaɫo̝t̪o̝/ | пелите^{1} /ˈpɛlit̪ɛ/ |
| First | 7th | вършах /vɐrˈʃax/ | вършал /vɐrˈʃaɫ/ | вършала /vɐrˈʃaɫə/ | вършало /vɐrˈʃaɫo̝/ | вършали^{2} /vɐrˈʃali/ | вършалият^{2} /vɐrˈʃalijət̪/ | вършалия^{2} /vɐrˈʃalijə/ | вършалата /vɐrˈʃaɫət̪ə/ | вършалото /vɐrˈʃaɫo̝t̪o̝/ | вършалите^{2} /vɐrˈʃalit̪ɛ/ |
| Second | 1st | говорих /ɡoˈvɔɾix/ /ɡo̝voˈɾix/ | говорил /ɡoˈvɔɾiɫ/ /ɡo̝voˈɾiɫ/ | говорила /ɡoˈvɔɾiɫə/ /ɡo̝voˈɾiɫə/ | говорило /ɡoˈvɔɾiɫo̝/ /ɡo̝voˈɾiɫo̝/ | говорили /ɡoˈvɔɾili/ /ɡo̝voˈɾili/ | говорилият /ɡoˈvɔɾilijət̪/ /ɡo̝voˈɾilijət̪/ | говорилия /ɡoˈvɔɾilijə/ /ɡo̝voˈɾilijə/ | говорилата /ɡoˈvɔɾiɫət̪ə/ /ɡo̝voˈɾiɫət̪ə/ | говорилото /ɡoˈvɔɾiɫo̝t̪o̝/ /ɡo̝voˈɾiɫo̝t̪o̝/ | говорилите /ɡoˈvɔɾilit̪ɛ/ /ɡo̝voˈɾilit̪ɛ/ |
| Second | 2nd | вървях /vɐrˈvʲax/ | вървял /vɐrˈvʲaɫ/ | вървяла /vɐrˈvʲaɫə/ | вървяло /vɐrˈvʲaɫo̝/ | вървели^{1} /vɐrˈvɛli/ | вървелият^{1} /vɐrˈvɛlijət̪/ | вървелия^{1} /vɐrˈvɛlijə/ | вървялата /vɐrˈvʲaɫət̪ə/ | вървялото /vɐrˈvʲaɫo̝t̪o̝/ | вървелите^{1} /vɐrˈvɛlit̪ɛ/ |
| Second | 3rd | лежах /lɛˈʒax/ | лежал /lɛˈʒaɫ/ | лежала /lɛˈʒaɫə/ | лежало /lɛˈʒaɫo̝/ | лежали /lɛˈʒali/ | лежалият /lɛˈʒalijət̪/ | лежалия /lɛˈʒalijə/ | лежалата /lɛˈʒaɫət̪ə/ | лежалото /lɛˈʒaɫo̝t̪o̝/ | лежалите /lɛˈʒalit̪ɛ/ |
| Third | 1st | исках /ˈiskəx/ /isˈkax/ | искал /ˈiskəɫ/ /isˈkaɫ/ | искала /ˈiskəɫə/ /isˈkaɫə/ | искало /ˈiskəɫo̝/ /isˈkaɫo̝/ | искали /ˈiskəli/ /isˈkali/ | искалият /ˈiskəlijət̪/ /isˈkalijət̪/ | искалия /ˈiskəlijə/ /isˈkalijə/ | искалата /ˈiskəɫət̪ə/ /isˈkaɫət̪ə/ | искалото /ˈiskəɫo̝t̪o̝/ /isˈkaɫo̝t̪o̝/ | искалите /ˈiskəlit̪ɛ/ /isˈkalit̪ɛ/ |
| Third | 2nd | стрелях /ˈst̪rɛlʲəx/ /st̪rɛˈlʲax/ | стрелял /ˈst̪rɛlʲəɫ/ /st̪rɛˈlʲaɫ/ | стреляла /ˈst̪rɛlʲəɫə/ /st̪rɛˈlʲaɫə/ | стреляло /ˈst̪rɛlʲəɫo̝/ /st̪rɛˈlʲaɫo̝/ | стреляли /ˈst̪rɛlʲəli/ /st̪rɛˈlʲali/ | стрелялият /ˈst̪rɛlʲəlijət̪/ /st̪rɛˈlʲalijət̪/ | стрелялия /ˈst̪rɛlʲəlijə/ /st̪rɛˈlʲalijə/ | стрелялата /ˈst̪rɛlʲəɫət̪ə/ /st̪rɛˈlʲaɫət̪ə/ | стрелялото /ˈst̪rɛlʲəɫo̝t̪o̝/ /st̪rɛˈlʲaɫo̝t̪o̝/ | стрелялите /ˈst̪rɛlʲəlit̪ɛ/ /st̪rɛˈlʲalit̪ɛ/ |

^{1} Since the yat vowel is followed by a syllable containing и (/i/) it is pronounced as е (/ɛ/).

^{2} Although the yat vowel is followed by a syllable containing и (/i/), it is not pronounced as е (/ɛ/).

=== Past Active Imperfect Participle ===
It is formed from the first-person-singular-past-imperfect form of the verb by removing the final х (/x/) and adding л (/ɫ/). It is inflected as a regular adjective, but without definite forms, since it is never used as an actual adjective, but only in certain verbal constructions (see the endings).

| 1st person singular past imperfect | Past Active Imperfect Participle | | | |
| 1st person singular past imperfect | Masculine | Feminine | Neuter | Plural |
|---|---|---|---|---|
| четях /tʃɛˈt̪ʲax/ | четял /tʃɛˈt̪ʲaɫ/ | четяла /tʃɛˈt̪ʲaɫə/ | четяло /tʃɛˈt̪ʲaɫo̝/ | четели^{1} /tʃɛˈt̪ɛli/ |
| говорех /ɡoˈvɔrɛx/ | говорел /ɡoˈvɔrɛɫ/ | говорела /ɡoˈvɔrɛɫə/ | говорело /ɡoˈvɔrɛɫo̝/ | говорели /ɡoˈvɔrɛli/ |
| печах /pɛˈtʃax/ печех /pɛˈtʃɛx/ | печал /pɛˈtʃaɫ/ печел /pɛˈtʃɛɫ/ | печала /pɛˈtʃaɫə/ печела /pɛˈtʃɛɫə/ | печало /pɛˈtʃaɫo̝/ печело /pɛˈtʃɛɫo̝/ | печали^{2} /pɛˈtʃali/ печели /pɛˈtʃɛli/ |
| исках /ˈiskəx/ | искал /ˈiskəɫ/ | искала /ˈiskəɫə/ | искало /ˈiskəɫo̝/ | искали /ˈiskəli/ |

^{1} Since the yat vowel is followed by a syllable containing и (/i/) it is pronounced as е (/ɛ/).

^{2} Although the yat vowel is followed by a syllable containing и (/i/), it is not pronounced as е (/ɛ/).

=== Past Passive Participle ===
Only transitive verbs have a past passive participle. It is formed from the first-person-singular-past-aorist form of the verb by removing the final х (/x/) and adding н (/n/) or т (/t̪/), after that it is inflected as an adjective (see the endings). Verbs from the first class of the first conjugation and the first class of the second conjugation change the thematic vowel of the past aorist to е (/ɛ/).

The vast majority of the verbs use the ending н (/n/), only some verbs from the first conjugation use т (/t̪/), namely all verbs with stems ending in н (/n/) from the second class, and a few verbs from the seventh class (all stems ending in /i/, /u/, /ju/, /ɛm/ and a few others). Some verbs from the seventh class can use both endings.

Although the past passive participle is formed from the past aorist, it does not have a stress shift, it always keeps the stress of the present tense, except for first conjugation verbs from the first class, and the verbs греба and гриза which used to belong to the first class.

| Conjugation | Class | Citation form | Stem | 1st person singular past aorist | Past Passive Participle | | | | | | | | |
| Conjugation | Class | Citation form | Stem | 1st person singular past aorist | Indefinite | | | | Definite | | | | |
| Conjugation | Class | Citation form | Stem | 1st person singular past aorist | Masculine | Feminine | Neuter | Plural | Masculine subject form | Masculine object form | Feminine | Neuter | Plural |
|---|---|---|---|---|---|---|---|---|---|---|---|---|---|
| First | 1st | чета /tʃɛˈt̪ɤ/ | чет- /tʃɛt̪/ | четох /ˈtʃɛt̪o̝x/ | четен^{1} /ˈtʃɛt̪ɛn/ | четена^{1} /ˈtʃɛt̪ɛnə/ | четено^{1} /ˈtʃɛt̪ɛno̝/ | четени^{1} /ˈtʃɛt̪ɛni/ | четеният^{1} /ˈtʃɛt̪ɛnijət̪/ | четения^{1} /ˈtʃɛt̪ɛnijə/ | четената^{1} /ˈtʃɛt̪ɛnət̪ə/ | четеното^{1} /ˈtʃɛt̪ɛno̝t̪o̝/ | четените^{1} /ˈtʃɛt̪ɛnit̪ɛ/ |
| First | 1st | пека /pɛˈkɤ/ | пек- /pɛk/ | пекох /ˈpɛko̝x/ | печен^{1,2} /ˈpɛtʃɛn/ | печена^{1,2} /ˈpɛtʃɛnə/ | печено^{1,2} /ˈpɛtʃɛno̝/ | печени^{1,2} /ˈpɛtʃɛni/ | печеният^{1,2} /ˈpɛtʃɛnijət̪/ | печения^{1,2} /ˈpɛtʃɛnijə/ | печената^{1,2} /ˈpɛtʃɛnət̪ə/ | печеното^{1,2} /ˈpɛtʃɛno̝t̪o̝/ | печените^{1,2} /ˈpɛtʃɛnit̪ɛ/ |
| First | 1st | сека /sɛˈkɤ/ | сек- /sɛk/ | сякох /ˈsʲako̝x/ | сечен^{1,2,3} /ˈsɛtʃɛn/ | сечена^{1,2,3} /ˈsɛtʃɛnə/ | сечено^{1,2,3} /ˈsɛtʃɛno̝/ | сечени^{1,2,3} /ˈsɛtʃɛni/ | сеченият^{1,2,3} /ˈsɛtʃɛnijət̪/ | сечения^{1,2,3} /ˈsɛtʃɛnijə/ | сечената^{1,2,3} /ˈsɛtʃɛnət̪ə/ | сеченото^{1,2,3} /ˈsɛtʃɛno̝t̪o̝/ | сечените^{1,2,3} /ˈsɛtʃɛnit̪ɛ/ |
| First | 2nd | бръсна /ˈbrɤsnə/ | бръсн- /ˈbrɤsn/ | бръснах /ˈbrɤsnəx/ /brɐsˈnax/ | бръснат /ˈbrɤsnət̪/^{4} | бръсната /ˈbrɤsnət̪ə/^{4} | бръснато /ˈbrɤsnət̪o̝/^{4} | бръснати /ˈbrɤsnət̪i/^{4} | бръснатият /ˈbrɤsnət̪ijət̪/^{4} | бръснатия /ˈbrɤsnət̪ijə/^{4} | бръснатата /ˈbrɤsnət̪ət̪ə/^{4} | бръснатото /ˈbrɤsnət̪o̝t̪o̝/^{4} | бръснатите /ˈbrɤsnət̪it̪ɛ/^{4} |
| First | 2nd | кова /koˈvɤ/ | ков- /kov/ | ковах /koˈvax/ | кован /koˈvan/ | кована /koˈvanə/ | ковано /koˈvano̝/ | ковани /koˈvani/ | кованият /koˈvanijət̪/ | кования /koˈvanijə/ | кованата /koˈvanət̪ə/ | кованото /koˈvano̝t̪o̝/ | кованите /koˈvanit̪ɛ/ |
| First | 3rd | къпя /ˈkɤpʲə/ | къп- /ˈkɤp/ | къпах /ˈkɤpəx/ /kɐˈpax/ | къпан /ˈkɤpən/^{4} | къпана /ˈkɤpənə/^{4} | къпано /ˈkɤpəno̝/^{4} | къпани /ˈkɤpəni/^{4} | къпаният /ˈkɤpənijət̪/^{4} | къпания /ˈkɤpənijə/^{4} | къпаната /ˈkɤpənət̪ə/^{4} | къпаното /ˈkɤpəno̝t̪o̝/^{4} | къпаните /ˈkɤpənit̪ɛ/^{4} |
| First | 4th | кажа /ˈkaʒə/ | каж- /ˈkaʒ/ | казах /ˈkazəx/ /kɐˈzax/ | казан /ˈkazən/^{4} | казана /ˈkazənə/^{4} | казано /ˈkazəno̝/^{4} | казани /ˈkazəni/^{4} | казаният /ˈkazənijət̪/^{4} | казания /ˈkazənijə/^{4} | казаната /ˈkazənət̪ə/^{4} | казаното /ˈkazəno̝t̪o̝/^{4} | казаните /ˈkazənit̪ɛ/^{4} |
| First | 5th | спра /sprɤ/ | спр- /spr/ | спрях /sprʲax/ | спрян /sprʲan/ | спряна /ˈsprʲanə/ | спряно /ˈsprʲano̝/ | спрени^{3} /ˈsprɛni/ | спреният^{3} /ˈsprɛnijət̪/ | спрения^{3} /ˈsprɛnijə/ | спряната /ˈsprʲanət̪ə/ | спряното /ˈsprʲano̝t̪o̝/ | спрените^{3} /ˈsprɛnit̪ɛ/ |
| First | 6th | вая /ˈvajə/ | ва- /ˈva/ | ваях /ˈvajəx/ /vɐˈjax/ | ваян /ˈvajən/^{4} | ваяна /ˈvajənə/^{4} | ваяно /ˈvajəno̝/^{4} | ваяни /ˈvajəni/^{4} | ваяният /ˈvajənijət̪/^{4} | ваяния /ˈvajənijə/^{4} | ваяната /ˈvajənət̪ə/^{4} | ваяното /ˈvajəno̝t̪o̝/^{4} | ваяните /ˈvajənit̪ɛ/^{4} |
| First | 7th | играя /iˈɡrajə/ | игра- /iˈɡra/ | играх /iˈɡrax/ | игран /iˈɡran/ | играна /iˈɡranə/ | играно /iˈɡrano̝/ | играни /iˈɡrani/ | играният /iˈɡranijət̪/ | играния /iˈɡranijə/ | играната /iˈɡranət̪ə/ | играното /iˈɡrano̝t̪o̝/ | играните /iˈɡranit̪ɛ/ |
| First | 7th | пея /ˈpɛjə/ | пе- /ˈpɛ/ | пях /pʲax/ | пят /pʲat̪/ | пята /ˈpʲat̪ə/ | пято /ˈpʲat̪o̝/ | пети^{3} /ˈpɛt̪i/ | петият^{3} /ˈpɛt̪ijət̪/ | петия^{3} /ˈpɛt̪ijə/ | пятата /ˈpʲat̪ət̪ə/ | пятото /ˈpʲat̪o̝t̪o̝/ | петите^{3} /ˈpɛt̪it̪ɛ/ |
| First | 7th | нагрея /nɐˈɡrɛjə/ | нагре- /nɐˈɡrɛ/ | нагрях /nɐˈɡrʲax/ | нагрят /nɐˈɡrʲat̪/ нагрян /nɐˈɡrʲan/ | нагрята /nɐˈɡrʲat̪ə/ нагряна /nɐˈɡrʲanə/ | нагрято /nɐˈɡrʲat̪o̝/ нагряно /nɐˈɡrʲano̝/ | нагрети^{3} /nɐˈɡrɛt̪i/ нагрени^{3} /nɐˈɡrɛni/ | нагретият^{3} /nɐˈɡrɛt̪ijət̪/ нагреният^{3} /nɐˈɡrɛnijət̪/ | нагретия^{3} /nɐˈɡrɛt̪ijə/ нагрения^{3} /nɐˈɡrɛnijə/ | нагрятата /nɐˈɡrʲat̪ət̪ə/ нагряната /nɐˈɡrʲanət̪ə/ | нагрятото /nɐˈɡrʲat̪o̝t̪o̝/ нагряното /nɐˈɡrʲano̝t̪o̝/ | нагретите^{3} /nɐˈɡrɛt̪it̪ɛ/ нагрените^{3} /nɐˈɡrɛnit̪ɛ/ |
| First | 7th | пия /ˈpijə/ | пи- /ˈpi/ | пих /pix/ | пит /pit̪/ | пита /ˈpit̪ə/ | пито /ˈpit̪o̝/ | пити /ˈpit̪i/ | питият /ˈpit̪ijət̪/ | пития /ˈpit̪ijə/ | питата /ˈpit̪ət̪ə/ | питото /ˈpit̪o̝t̪o̝/ | питите /ˈpit̪it̪ɛ/ |
| First | 7th | взема /ˈvzɛmə/ | взем- /ˈvzɛm/ | взех /vzɛx/ | взет /vzɛt̪/ | взета /ˈvzɛt̪ə/ | взето /ˈvzɛt̪o̝/ | взети /ˈvzɛt̪i/ | взетият /ˈvzɛt̪ijət̪/ | взетия /ˈvzɛt̪ijə/ | взетата /ˈvzɛt̪ət̪ə/ | взетото /ˈvzɛt̪o̝t̪o̝/ | взетите /ˈvzɛt̪it̪ɛ/ |
| Second | 1st | говоря /ɡoˈvɔrʲə/ | говор- /ɡoˈvɔɾ/ | говорих /ɡoˈvɔɾix/ /ɡo̝voˈɾix/ | говорен^{5} /ɡoˈvɔɾɛn/^{4} | говорена^{5} /ɡoˈvɔɾɛnə/^{4} | говорено^{5} /ɡoˈvɔɾɛno̝/^{4} | говорени^{5} /ɡoˈvɔɾɛni/^{4} | говореният^{5} /ɡoˈvɔɾɛnijət̪/^{4} | говорения^{5} /ɡoˈvɔɾɛnijə/^{4} | говорената^{5} /ɡoˈvɔɾɛnət̪ə/^{4} | говореното^{5} /ɡoˈvɔɾɛno̝t̪o̝/^{4} | говорените^{5} /ɡoˈvɔɾɛnit̪ɛ/^{4} |
| Second | 2nd | извървя /izvɐrˈvʲɤ/ | извърв- /izvɐrv/ | извървях /izvɐrˈvʲax/ | извървян /izvɐrˈvʲan/ | извървяна /izvɐrˈvʲanə/ | извървяно /izvɐrˈvʲano̝/ | извървени^{3} /izvɐrˈvɛni/ | извървеният^{3} /izvɐrˈvɛnijət̪/ | извървения^{3} /izvɐrˈvɛnijə/ | извървяната /izvɐrˈvʲanət̪ə/ | извървяното /izvɐrˈvʲano̝t̪o̝/ | извървените^{3} /izvɐrˈvɛnit̪ɛ/ |
| Second | 3rd | премълча /prɛmɐɫˈtʃɤ/ | премълч- /prɛmɐɫtʃ/ | премълчах /prɛmɐɫˈtʃax/ | премълчан /prɛmɐɫˈtʃan/ | премълчана /prɛmɐɫˈtʃanə/ | премълчано /prɛmɐɫˈtʃano̝/ | премълчани /prɛmɐɫˈtʃani/ | премълчаният /prɛmɐɫˈtʃanijət̪/ | премълчания /prɛmɐɫˈtʃanijə/ | премълчаната /prɛmɐɫˈtʃanət̪ə/ | премълчаното /prɛmɐɫˈtʃano̝t̪o̝/ | премълчаните /prɛmɐɫˈtʃanit̪ɛ/ |
| Third | 1st | искам /ˈiskəm/ | иска- /ˈiskə/ | исках /ˈiskəx/ /isˈkax/ | искан /ˈiskən/^{4} | искана /ˈiskənə/^{4} | искано /ˈiskəno̝/^{4} | искани /ˈiskəni/^{4} | исканият /ˈiskənijət̪/^{4} | искания /ˈiskənijə/^{4} | исканата /ˈiskənət̪ə/^{4} | исканото /ˈiskəno̝t̪o̝/^{4} | исканите /ˈiskənit̪ɛ/^{4} |
| Third | 2nd | застрелям /zɐˈst̪rɛlʲəm/ | застреля- /zɐˈst̪rɛlʲə/ | застрелях /zɐˈst̪rɛlʲəx/ | застрелян /zɐˈst̪rɛlʲən/ | застреляна /zɐˈst̪rɛlʲənə/ | застреляно /zɐˈst̪rɛlʲəno̝/ | застреляни /zɐˈst̪rɛlʲəni/ | застреляният /zɐˈst̪rɛlʲənijət̪/ | застреляния /zɐˈst̪rɛlʲənijə/ | застреляната /zɐˈst̪rɛlʲənət̪ə/ | застреляното /zɐˈst̪rɛlʲəno̝t̪o̝/ | застреляните /zɐˈst̪rɛlʲənit̪ɛ/ |

^{1} Notice that the thematic vowel о (/o̝/) is changed to е (/ɛ/).

^{2} The consonant к (/k/) changes to ч (/tʃ/) before the front vowel е (/ɛ/).

^{3} Since the yat vowel is followed by a syllable containing и (/i/) it is pronounced as е (/ɛ/).

^{4} Notice that there is no stress shift, unlike the past aorist and the past active aorist participle.

^{5} Notice that the thematic vowel и (/i/) is changed to е (/ɛ/).

=== Adverbial Participle ===
Only imperfective verbs have an adverbial participle. Verbs from the first and second conjugation use the thematic vowel е (/ɛ/) between the stem and the ending -йки (/jkʲi/). Verbs from the third conjugation just add the ending without using a thematic vowel. This participle is immutable.

The adverbial participle keeps the stress of the present tense.

| Conjugation | Citation form | Stem | Adverbial Participle |
|---|---|---|---|
| First and Second | чета /tʃɛˈt̪ɤ/ | чет- /tʃɛt̪/ | четейки /tʃɛˈt̪ɛjkʲi/ |
| First and Second | пиша /ˈpiʃə/ | пиш- /piʃ/ | пишейки /ˈpiʃɛjkʲi/ |
| First and Second | пея /ˈpɛjə/ | пе- /pɛ/ | пеейки /ˈpɛ.ɛjkʲi/ |
| First and Second | говоря /ɡoˈvɔrʲə/ | говор- /ɡoˈvɔr/ | говорейки /ɡoˈvɔrɛjkʲi/ |
| First and Second | стоя /st̪oˈjɤ/ | сто- /st̪o/ | стоейки /st̪oˈɛjkʲi/ |
| Third | искам /ˈiskəm/ | иска- /ˈiskə/ | искайки /ˈiskəjkʲi/ |
| Third | стрелям /ˈstrɛlʲəm/ | стреля- /ˈstrɛlʲə/ | стреляйки /ˈstrɛlʲəjkʲi/ |

=== Verbal Noun ===
Only imperfective verbs have a verbal noun. It is formed either from the first-person-singular-past-imperfect or -past aorist form of the verb (or from both). The final х (/x/) is removed and the ending не (/nɛ/) is added. After that it is inflected as neuter noun (see the endings). If the thematic vowel is о (/o̝/), и (/i/) or the yat vowel, it is changed to е (/ɛ/) before adding the ending.

Stems ending in н (/n/) from the second class of the first conjugation, and stems ending in е (/ɛ/), и (/i/), у (/u/) and ю (/ju/) from the seventh class use only the past imperfect to form the verbal noun. All verbs from the first class of the second conjugation use only the past aorist. The remaining verbs may use only the past aorist, only the past imperfect or both. This is not determined by which conjugation or class a verb belongs to, it is an inherent characteristic of each verb.

When the verbal noun is formed from the past aorist, it does not have a stress shift, it usually keeps the stress of the present tense, except for first-conjugation verbs from the first class, and a few other verbs which move the stress further back on the ending.

| Conjugation | Class | Citation form | Stem | 1st person singular past aorist | 1st person singular past imperfect | Verbal noun | | | | | |
| Conjugation | Class | Citation form | Stem | 1st person singular past aorist | 1st person singular past imperfect | Indefinite | | | Definite | | |
| Conjugation | Class | Citation form | Stem | 1st person singular past aorist | 1st person singular past imperfect | Singular | Plural I | Plural II | Singular | Plural I | Plural II |
|---|---|---|---|---|---|---|---|---|---|---|---|
| First | 1st | треса /t̪rɛˈsɤ/ | трес- /t̪rɛs/ | тресох /ˈt̪rɛso̝x/ | тресях /t̪rɛˈsʲax/ | тресене^{1,2,3} /ˈt̪rɛsɛnɛ/ /t̪rɛˈsɛnɛ/ | тресенета^{1,2,3} /ˈt̪rɛsɛnɛt̪ə/ /t̪rɛˈsɛnɛt̪ə/ | тресения^{1,2,3} /ˈt̪rɛsɛnijə/ /t̪rɛˈsɛnijə/ | тресенето^{1,2,3} /ˈt̪rɛsɛnɛt̪o̝/ /t̪rɛˈsɛnɛt̪o̝/ | тресенетата^{1,2,3} /ˈt̪rɛsɛnɛt̪ət̪ə/ /t̪rɛˈsɛnɛt̪ət̪ə/ | тресенията^{1,2,3} /ˈt̪rɛsɛnijət̪ə/ /t̪rɛˈsɛnijət̪ə/ |
| First | 2nd | бръсна /ˈbrɤsnə/ | бръсн- /ˈbrɤsn/ | | бръснех /ˈbrɤsnɛx/ | бръснене /ˈbrɤsnɛnɛ/ | бръсненета /ˈbrɤsnɛnɛt̪ə/ | бръснения /ˈbrɤsnɛnijə/ | бръсненето /ˈbrɤsnɛnɛt̪o̝/ | бръсненетата /ˈbrɤsnɛnɛt̪ət̪ə/ | бръсненията /ˈbrɤsnɛnijət̪ə/ |
| First | 2nd | пера /pɛˈrɤ/ | пер- /pɛr/ | прах /ˈprax/ | | пране /prɐˈnɛ/^{4} | пранета /prɐˈnɛt̪ə/^{4} | прания /prɐˈnijə/^{4} | прането /prɐˈnɛt̪o̝/^{4} | пранетата /prɐˈnɛt̪ət̪ə/^{4} | пранията /prɐˈnijət̪ə/^{4} |
| First | 3rd | къпя /ˈkɤpʲə/ | къп- /ˈkɤp/ | къпах /ˈkɤpəx/ /kɐˈpax/ | къпех /ˈkɤpɛx/ | къпане /ˈkɤpənɛ/^{5} къпене /ˈkɤpɛnɛ/ | къпанета /ˈkɤpənɛt̪ə/^{5} къпенета /ˈkɤpɛnɛt̪ə/ | къпания /ˈkɤpənijə/^{5} къпения /ˈkɤpɛnijə/ | къпането /ˈkɤpənɛt̪o̝/^{5} къпенето /ˈkɤpɛnɛt̪o̝/ | къпанетата /ˈkɤpənɛt̪ət̪ə/^{5} къпенетата /ˈkɤpɛnɛt̪ət̪ə/ | къпанията /ˈkɤpənijət̪ə/^{5} къпенията /ˈkɤpɛnijət̪ə/ |
| First | 4th | лъжа /ˈɫɤʒə/ | лъж- /ˈɫɤʒ/ | лъгах /ˈɫɤɡəx/ /ɫɐˈɡax/ | лъжех /ˈɫɤʒɛx/ | лъгане /ˈɫɤɡənɛ/^{5} лъжене /ˈɫɤʒɛnɛ/ | лъганета /ˈɫɤɡənɛt̪ə/^{5} лъженета /ˈɫɤʒɛnɛt̪ə/ | лъгания /ˈɫɤɡənijə/^{5} лъжения /ˈɫɤʒɛnijə/ | лъгането /ˈɫɤɡənɛt̪o̝/^{5} лъженето /ˈɫɤʒɛnɛt̪o̝/ | лъганетата /ˈɫɤɡənɛt̪ət̪ə/^{5} лъженетата /ˈɫɤʒɛnɛt̪ət̪ə/ | лъганията /ˈɫɤɡənijət̪ə/^{5} лъженията /ˈɫɤʒɛnijət̪ə/ |
| First | 7th | играя /iˈɡrajə/ | игра- /iˈɡra/ | играх /iˈɡrax/ | играех /iˈɡraɛx/ | игране /iˈɡranɛ/ играене /iˈɡra.ɛnɛ/ | игранета /iˈɡranɛt̪ə/ играенета /iˈɡra.ɛnɛt̪ə/ | играния /iˈɡranijə/ играения /iˈɡra.ɛnijə/ | игрането /iˈɡranɛt̪o̝/ играенето /iˈɡra.ɛnɛt̪o̝/ | игранетата /iˈɡranɛt̪ət̪ə/ играенетата /iˈɡra.ɛnɛt̪ət̪ə/ | игранията /iˈɡranijət̪ə/ играенията /iˈɡra.ɛnijət̪ə/ |
| First | 7th | пея /ˈpɛjə/ | пе- /ˈpɛ/ | | пеех /pɛ.ɛx/ | пеене /pɛ.ɛnɛ/ | пеенета /pɛ.ɛnɛt̪ə/ | пеения /pɛ.ɛnijə/ | пеенето /pɛ.ɛnɛt̪o̝/ | пеенетата /pɛ.ɛnɛt̪ət̪ə/ | пеенията /pɛ.ɛnijət̪ə/ |
| Second | 1st | говоря /ɡoˈvɔrʲə/ | говор- /ɡoˈvɔɾ/ | говорих /ɡoˈvɔɾix/ /ɡo̝voˈɾix/ | | говорене^{6} /ɡoˈvɔɾɛnɛ/^{5} | говоренета^{6} /ɡoˈvɔɾɛnɛt̪ə/^{5} | говорения^{6} /ɡoˈvɔɾɛnijə/^{5} | говоренето^{6} /ɡoˈvɔɾɛnɛt̪o̝/^{5} | говоренетата^{6} /ɡoˈvɔɾɛnɛt̪ət̪ə/^{5} | говоренията^{6} /ɡoˈvɔɾɛnijət̪ə/^{5} |
| Second | 2nd | вървя /vɐrˈvʲɤ/ | върв- /vɐrv/ | вървях /vɐrˈvʲax/ | вървях /vɐrˈvʲax/ | вървене^{2,7} /vɐrˈvɛnɛ/ | вървенета^{2,7} /vɐrˈvɛnɛt̪ə/ | вървения^{2,7} /vɐrˈvɛnijə/ | вървенето^{2,7} /vɐrˈvɛnɛt̪o̝/ | вървенетата^{2,7} /vɐrˈvɛnɛt̪ət̪ə/ | вървенията^{2,7} /vɐrˈvɛnijət̪ə/ |
| Second | 3rd | лежа /lɛˈʒɤ/ | леж- /lɛʒ/ | лежах /lɛˈʒax/ | лежех /lɛˈʒɛx/ | лежане /lɛˈʒanɛ/ лежене /lɛˈʒɛnɛ/ | лежанета /lɛˈʒanɛt̪ə/ леженета /lɛˈʒɛnɛt̪ə/ | лежания /lɛˈʒanijə/ лежения /lɛˈʒɛnijə/ | лежането /lɛˈʒanɛt̪o̝/ леженето /lɛˈʒɛnɛt̪o̝/ | лежанетата /lɛˈʒanɛt̪ət̪ə/ леженетата /lɛˈʒɛnɛt̪ət̪ə/ | лежанията /lɛˈʒanijət̪ə/ леженията /lɛˈʒɛnijət̪ə/ |
| Third | 1st | искам /ˈiskəm/ | иска- /ˈiskə/ | исках /ˈiskəx/ /isˈkax/ | исках /ˈiskəx/ | искане^{7} /ˈiskənɛ/^{5} | исканета^{7} /ˈiskənɛt̪ə/^{5} | искания^{7} /ˈiskənijə/^{5} | искането^{7} /ˈiskənɛt̪o̝/^{5} | исканетата^{7} /ˈiskənɛt̪ət̪ə/^{5} | исканията^{7} /ˈiskənijət̪ə/^{5} |
| Third | 2nd | стрелям /ˈst̪rɛlʲəm/ | стреля- /ˈst̪rɛlʲə/ | стрелях /ˈst̪rɛlʲəx/ /st̪rɛˈlʲax/ | стрелях /ˈst̪rɛlʲəx/ | стреляне^{7} /ˈst̪rɛlʲənɛ/^{5} | стрелянета^{7} /ˈst̪rɛlʲənɛt̪ə/^{5} | стреляния^{7} /ˈst̪rɛlʲənijə/^{5} | стрелянето^{7} /ˈst̪rɛlʲənɛt̪o̝/^{5} | стрелянетата^{7} /ˈst̪rɛlʲənɛt̪ət̪ə/^{5} | стрелянията^{7} /ˈst̪rɛlʲənijət̪ə/^{5} |

^{1} Notice that the thematic vowel о (/o̝/) is changed to е (/ɛ/).

^{3} Since the yat vowel is followed by a syllable containing е (/ɛ/), it is pronounced as е (/ɛ/).

^{3} Since both the vowel о (/o̝/) and the yat vowel are changed to е (/ɛ/), the two forms of the verbal noun are written the same, but pronounced differently, they differ by stress position.

^{4} Notice that the stress is on the ending.

^{5} Notice that there is no stress shift, just like the past passive participle and unlike the past aorist and the past active aorist participle.

^{6} Notice that the thematic vowel и (/i/) is changed to е (/ɛ/).

^{7} Since the past aorist and imperfect forms are identical the two forms of the verbal noun are also identical.

== Bibliography ==
- Bulgarian Academy of Sciences, Institute of Bulgarian Language (1983) Граматика на съвременния български книжовен език. Том 2. Морфология
