= Wilhelm Grube =

German sinologist and ethnographer

- Born: 17 August 1855; Saint Petersburg, Russia
- Died: 2 July 1908; Halensee near Berlin, Germany
- Citizenship: Germany
- Known for: Study of Tungusic languages
- Scientific career
- Fields: Linguistics
- Workplaces: University of Berlin
- Doctoral advisor: Georg von der Gabelentz

Signature
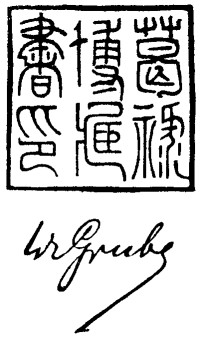

Wilhelm Grube (Chinese: 葛祿博; pinyin: Gé Lùbó) (17 August 1855 – 2 July 1908) was a German sinologist and ethnographer. He is particularly known for his work on Tungusic languages and the Jurchen language.

== Biography ==
Grube was born in Saint Petersburg, Russia in 1855. He studied Chinese, Manchu, Mongolian and Tibetan under Franz Anton Schiefner at the University of Saint Petersburg from 1874 to 1878.

In 1878, Grube moved to Germany to study at the University of Leipzig under Georg von der Gabelentz, and he submitted his doctoral dissertation in 1880. The following year he taught a course on Tibetan grammar at the University of Leipzig, but he was unable to obtain a regular teaching position, and so in 1883 he took up a position as an assistant at the Ethnological Museum of Berlin. He also had a junior teaching position at the University of Berlin, and in 1892 he was awarded the title of extraordinary professor.

In 1897 he went to China with his wife, and they stayed there until 1899, acquiring a large collection which he deposited in the Ethnological Museum of Berlin when he returned.

== Scholarship ==
Grube is principally remembered for his pioneering studies of three little-known languages, two spoken in the Amur region of the Russian Far East, and one extinct language spoken by the Jurchen people of Manchuria.

At the behest of the Saint Petersburg Academy of Sciences, Grube worked on the linguistic materials brought back from the Amur region by Carl Maximowicz and Leopold von Schrenck during the 1850s. Based on these materials, in 1892 Grube published a vocabulary of the Gilyak language (a language isolate, also known as Nivkh), and in 1900 he published a vocabulary of the Gold language (a Tungusic language, also known as Nanai).

By the nineteenth century, the Jurchen language that had been spoken by the ancestors of the Manchu people during the Jin dynasty (1115–1234) was almost completely unknown, and the few surviving inscriptions in the Jurchen script were undecipherable. However, in the early 1890s the Royal Library at Berlin acquired a manuscript copy of the Vocabulary of the Bureau of Translators (Chinese: 華夷譯語; pinyin: Huá-Yí Yìyǔ) from Friedrich Hirth which included a chapter on the Jurchen language that was missing from other known copies of this book. The Jurchen chapter of this book comprised a vocabulary list with each word written in the Jurchen script and also transcribed phonetically using Chinese characters (this contrasts with the vocabularies produced by the Bureau of Interpreters, which only included the phonetic transcription in Chinese characters). In 1896 Grube published a translation and study of the Jurchen vocabulary list that changed the status of Jurchen from a completely undeciphered language to a language that could be read and understood with the help of Grube's book. The year after its publication, S. W. Bushell used Grube's translation of the Jurchen vocabulary to study the Jurchen inscription on a stele from Kaifeng, and it has remained the principal source for the study of the Jurchen language ever since.

In addition to his linguistic studies, Grube also published extensively on Chinese philosophy, religion and mythology. He was also interested in Chinese literature, and posthumously published a German translation of the Chinese mythological novel, Fengshen Yanyi ('The Investiture of the Gods'), as well as German translations of a set of Chinese shadow play scripts.

== Works ==
- 1881. Die Sprachgeschichtliche Stellung des Chinesischen. T. O. Weigel.
- 1892. Linguistische Ergebnisse 1: Giljakisches Wörterverzeichniss nebst Grammatischen Bemerkungen (vocabulary and grammar of Gilyak). Part 1 of Leopold von Schrenck (ed.), Die Völker des Amur-Landes.
- 1896. Taoistischer Schöpfungsmythus. Reimer.
- 1896. Die Sprache und Schrift der Jučen (the language and writing of the Jurchen). Leipzig: Otto Harrassowitz.
- 1898. "Pekinger Totenbräuche"; Journal of the Peking Oriental Society Vol. IV: 79–141.
- 1900. Linguistische Ergebnisse 2: Goldisch-deutsches Wörterverzeichnis (vocabulary of the Gold language). Part 2 of Leopold von Schrenck (ed.), Die Völker des Amur-Landes.
- 1901. Zur Pekinger Volkskunde. Volume 7 of Veröffentlichungen aus dem Königlichen Museum für Völkerkunde. Berlin: W. Spemann.
- 1902. Geschichte der Chinesischen Litteratur; Volume 8 of Litteraturen des Ostens in Einzeldarstellungen. Leipzig: C. F. Amelangs.
- 1908–1909. Die Religion der Alten Chinesen. In Religionsgeschichtliches Lesebuch. Tübingen: J. C. B. Mohr.
- 1909. Die chinesische Philosophie.
- 1910. Religion und Kultus der Chinesen. Leipzig: R. Haupt.
- 1912. With Herbert Mueller. Fêng-shên-yên-i: Die Metamorphosen der Goetter (translation of the Chinese mythological novel Fengshen Yanyi). Leiden: Brill.
- 1915. With Emil Krebs. Chinesische Schattenspiele (collection of Chinese shadow play scripts). Leipzig: Otto Harrassowitz.
