= Margarita Vorobyova-Desyatovskaya =

Russian Orientalist (1933–2021)

- Born: 28 January 1933; Leningrad, Russian SFSR, Soviet Union
- Died: 13 June 2021 (aged 88); Saint Petersburg, Russia
- Citizenship: Soviet, Russian
- Education: Saint Petersburg State University
- Spouse: Vladimir Vorobyov-Desyatovsky
- Scientific career
- Fields: Central Asian manuscripts
- Workplaces: Institute of Oriental Manuscripts of the Russian Academy of Sciences
- Theses: Глагол в тибетском языке VII–XI вв. (The Verb in the Tibetan Language, 7th-11th centuries) (1966); Records of Indian and Tibetan Literature of the first millennium AD from East Turkestan and Central Asia as a source on history and culture (1989)

Margarita Iosifovna Vorobyova-Desyatovskaya (Russian: Маргари́та Ио́сифовна Воробьёва-Деся́товская; 28 January 1933 – 13 June 2021) was a Russian Orientalist best known for her research on Central Asian manuscripts in the Sanskrit, Khotanese and Scythian languages. She retired as Curator of Central Asian manuscripts at the Institute of Oriental Studies, Saint Petersburg.

== Life and death ==
Margarita was born in Leningrad in 1933. She took her Indologist husband, Vladimir Vorobyov-Desyatovsky's last name upon marriage.

In 1950, Vorobyova-Desyatovskaya began studies at the Indian department of the Oriental School of the Leningrad State University, transferring to the Leningrad branch of the Russian Academy of Sciences' Institute of Oriental Studies. She obtained her candidate of science degree in 1966 with a dissertation on Tibetan grammar. She worked as a senior researcher in the Tibetan division of the school, later joining the South and Southeast Asian division. From 1982 to 2005, she headed its department of manuscripts. The institute celebrated her jubilee in 2013. She retired in 2014.

Vorobyova-Desyatovskaya died on 13 June 2021 at the age of 88.

== Academics ==
Vorobyova-Desyatovskaya focussed on Buddhist manuscripts as well as documents in Sanskrit, Khotanese and Scythian languages from East Turkestan, which were brought to Russia by 19th century expeditioners such as Sergey Oldenburg, Mikhail Mikhailovich Berezovsky and Pyotr Kozlov. Manuscripts were also obtained from Khara-Khoto and Dunhuang. These formed the basis for the large collection of Central Asian manuscripts in the Institute of Oriental Studies.

Vorobyova-Desyatovskaya published inscriptions from the Kara Tepe Buddhist monastery near Termez, as well as Mahayana texts from Turfan. She also published the Bairam-Ali manuscripts from the Merv oasis, a collection of Jataka-type tales in the Brahmi script dated to between the 2nd and 5th centuries AD.

== Selected works ==
=== Monographs ===
- The Kasyapaparivarta. Romanized Text and Facsimiles. Tokyo: Soka University. 2002.
- The Hindu Pantheon: An Introduction, Illustrated with 19th Century Indian Miniatures from the St. Petersburg Collection. Garnet. 1994. ISBN 978-1873938478.
- История Бхадры. Moscow: Nauka. 1956.

=== Articles ===
- "The prospects of the Lotus Sutra's study in context of the history of Buddhist philosophical thought". Proceedings of the 37th International Congress of Orientalists. 2004.
- "Становление индологии в России". История отечественного востоковедения (до середины 19 века). Moscow: Nauka. 1990.
- Y.A. Petrosyan, ed. (1988). "Рукописи в культуре Индии". Рукописи в культуре народов Востока. Moscow: Nauka.
