= WO4 =

WO4 can refer to

- The tungstate ion WO^{2−}_{4}
- WO4 a classification of a Wolf–Rayet star
- Minor planet provisional designation 1990 WO_{4}, permanently called 14400 Baudot
- wo^{4} Juetping coding for a sentence-final particle in Cantonese indicating mirativity.
