= Classical Tibetan =

Early form of Tibetan language

- Region: Tibet, North Nepal, Sikkim
- Era: 9th century onwards
- Language family: Sino-Tibetan: Tibeto-Kanauri ?; Bodish; Tibetic; Classical Tibetan
- Early form: Old Tibetan
- Writing system: Tibetan script

Language codes
- ISO 639-3: xct
- Glottolog: clas1254

Classical Tibetan (Tibetan: ཆོས་སྐད།, Wylie: chos skad, Lhasa Tibetan pronunciation in IPA: /t͡ɕʰøː˥˥.kɛː˥˨/, literally "doctrine language" or "religious language"), sometimes called Chöke in Bhutan, is a liturgical language of Tibetan Buddhism that dates from the 9th century. It particularly refers to the language of early canonical texts translated from other languages, especially Sanskrit. It is one of the handful of 'living' classical languages along with Arabic, Ge'ez, and New Persian, though it meaningfully differs from Modern Standard Tibetan.

== History ==
The history of Tibetan as a literary language can be divided into five stages: Archaic, Old, Classical, Medieval and Modern. The earliest directly attested form, Old Tibetan, was used from the seventh century to translate mostly Sanskrit texts from the Mahāyāna Buddhist canon. Standardization (སྐད་གསར་བཅད་, Wylie: skad gsar bcad) in 816 CE during the reign of King Sadnalegs gave rise to the form of the language known as Classical Tibetan. The compilation of bilingual Tibetan-Sanskrit lexicons, the Mahāvyutpatti and the Madhyavyutpatti, as well as the collection of the rest of the Tibetan Buddhist canon, helped establish the key features of this literary standard.

Some medieval writers strayed from this written standard by using more colloquial phrases and words, compound words, and omitting case particles. This process continued to create the current differences between Modern Literary Tibetan and Classical Tibetan. The grammar varies greatly depending on period, genre and geographic origin of the author. However, even through the Era of Fragmentation, the continuity of the monastic education system ensured that Classical Tibetan remained the language of scholastic discourse. The so-called Second Diffusion of Buddhism (10th-12th centuries CE) brought a new wave of monastic scholasticism. Tibet under Yuan rule saw the rise of monastic centers such as Ganden, Sera and Drepung within the Gelug school of Buddhism, which played a major role in the dissemination of Classical Tibetan literature. In the 17th century, the 5th Dalai Lama, Ngawang Lobsang Gyatso consolidated the use of Classical Tibetan as the language of administration and scholarship as well as religion.

Despite the emergence of the Lhasa-based Modern Standard Tibetan in the twentieth century, Classical Tibetan remains the liturgical and literary language of Tibetan Buddhism in Tibet and the Tibetan diaspora, with new philosophical works and commentaries written and published in the classical language. It continues to exist in a diglossic situation with Modern Standard Tibetan and the local spoken varieties.

== Phonology ==
The phonology implied by Classical Tibetan orthography is very similar to the phonology of Old Tibetan. The following information is based on Hodge's description of Classical Tibetan.

=== Consonants ===
Consonant phonemes
		Labial	Coronal		Dorsal
Nasal		m ⟨མ⟩	n ⟨n~'⟩ ⟨ན~འ⟩ (Note: ' ⟨འ⟩ is usually silent, but may be pronounced [n] when occurring as a prefix.)		ŋ ⟨ng⟩ ⟨ང⟩
Plosive	voiceless	p ⟨པ⟩	t ⟨ཏ⟩		k ⟨ཀ⟩
Plosive	aspirated	pʰ ⟨ph⟩ ⟨ཕ⟩	tʰ ⟨th⟩ ⟨ཐ⟩		kʰ ⟨kh⟩ ⟨ཁ⟩
Plosive	voiced	b ⟨བ⟩	d ⟨ད⟩		ɡ ⟨ག⟩
Affricate	voiceless		ts ⟨ཙ⟩	t͡ʃ ⟨c⟩ ⟨ཅ⟩	
Affricate	aspirated		tsʰ ⟨tsh⟩ ⟨ཚ⟩	t͡ʃʰ ⟨ch⟩ ⟨ཆ⟩	
Affricate	voiced		dz ⟨ཛ⟩	d͡ʒ ⟨j⟩ ⟨ཇ⟩	
Fricative	voiceless		ɬ ⟨lh⟩ ⟨ལྷ⟩		h ⟨h⟩ ⟨ཧ⟩
Fricative	voiceless high tone		˥s ⟨s⟩ ⟨ས⟩	˥ʃ ⟨sh⟩ ⟨ཤ⟩	
Fricative	voiceless low tone		˩s ⟨z⟩ ⟨ཟ⟩	˩ʃ ⟨zh⟩ ⟨ཞ⟩	
Trill	voiced		r ⟨ར⟩		
Approximant	voiced	w ⟨ཝ⟩	l ⟨ལ⟩	j ⟨y⟩ ⟨ཡ⟩	

Prefixes are usually silent with the exception of db- when preceding a, e, or o, where it is realized as [w]. The suffixes -g and -b are devoiced to /k/ and /p/, and the suffixes -d and -s are silent.

=== Vowels ===
Vowel phonemes
	Front	Back
High	ɪ ⟨i⟩ ི	u ུ
Mid	e ེ	o ོ
Low		ɑ ⟨a⟩ -

/ɑ/, /u/, and /o/ are fronted to [ɛ], [y], [ø~œ] before the suffixes -d /∅/, -s /∅/, -n /n/, and -l /l/. All vowels are lengthened before the -gs /∅/ suffix.

== Grammar ==
=== Nouns ===
==== Structure of the noun phrase ====
Nominalizing suffixes — pa or ba and ma — are required by the noun or adjective that is to be singled out;

- po or bo (masculine) and mo (feminine) are used for distinction of gender.

The plural is denoted, when required, by adding the morpheme -rnams; when the collective nature of the plurality is stressed the morpheme -dag is instead used. These two morphemes combine readily (e.g. rnams-dag 'a group with several members', and dag-rnams 'several groups').

==== Cases ====
The classical written language has ten cases, listed below, though scholars differ in their analyses. Traditional Tibetan grammarians do not distinguish case markers in this manner, but rather distribute these case morphemes (excluding -dang and -bas) into the eight cases of Sanskrit. -la, -na and -tu etc. are traditionally grouped as the la don particles, as -las and -nas are as ’byung khungs.

Comparison of case analyses
Particles	Traditional	Delancey (2003)	Tournadre (2010)	Hill (2011)	Hodge (2015)
-∅ unmarked morphologically	nominative, vocative	zero marking	absolutive		-
-ཀྱི་ -kyi, -གྱི་ -gyi, -གི་ -gi, -འི་ -'i, -ཡི་ -yi	genitive				
-ཀྱིས་ -kyis, གྱིས་ -gyis, -གིས་ -gis, -ས་ -s, -ཡིས་ -yis	instrumental	ergative/instrumental	agentive		instrumental
-ལ་ -la	la-don-gyi sgra (morphemes with the same meaning as la)	locative/allative	dative	allative	oblique (locative/allative)
-ན་ -na	la-don-gyi sgra (morphemes with the same meaning as la)	locative/illative	locative		
-ཏུ་ -tu, -དུ་ -du, -ར་ -r, -རུ་ -ru, -སུ་ -su	la-don-gyi sgra (morphemes with the same meaning as la)	terminative	purposive	terminative	general subordination
-ལས་ -las	’byung khungs (source)	ablative			
-ནས་ -nas	’byung khungs (source)	elative			prolative
-དང་ -dang	-	-	associative		conjunctive
-བས་ -bas	-	-	comparative		-

Case markers are affixed to entire noun phrases, not to individual words (i.e. Gruppenflexion).

==== Pronouns ====
There are personal, demonstrative, interrogative and reflexive pronouns, as well as an indefinite article, which is plainly related to the numeral for "one."

===== Personal pronouns =====
As an example of the pronominal system of classical Tibetan, the Milarepa rnam thar, exhibits the following personal pronouns.

Person	Singular	Plural
First person	ང་ nga	ངེད་ nged
First + Second		རང་རེ་ rang-re
Second person	ཁྱོད་ khyod	ཁྱེད་ khyed
Third person	ཁོ་ kho	ཁོང་ khong

The plural (ཁྱེད་ khyed) can be used as a polite singular.

=== Verbs ===
Verbs do not inflect for person or number. Morphologically there are up to four separate stem forms, which the Tibetan grammarians, influenced by Sanskrit grammatical terminology, call the "present" (lta-da), "past" ('das-pa), "future" (ma-'ongs-pa), and "imperative" (skul-tshigs), although the precise semantics of these stems is still controversial. The so-called future stem is not a true future, but conveys the sense of necessity or obligation.

The majority of Tibetan verbs fall into one of two categories, those that express implicitly or explicitly the involvement of an agent, marked in a sentence by the instrumental particle (kyis, etc.) and those that express an action that does not involve an agent. Tibetan grammarians refer to these categories as tha-dad-pa and tha-mi-dad-pa respectively. Although these two categories often seem to overlap with the English grammatical concepts of transitive and intransitive, most modern writers on Tibetan grammar have adopted the terms "voluntary" and "involuntary", based on native Tibetan descriptions. Most involuntary verbs lack an imperative stem.

==== Inflection ====
Many verbs exhibit stem ablaut among the four stem forms, thus a or e in the present tends to become o in the imperative byed, byas, bya, byos ('to do'), an e in the present changes to a in the past and future (len, blangs, blang, longs 'to take'); in some verbs a present in i changes to u in the other stems ('dzin, bzung, gzung, zung 'to take'). Additionally, the stems of verbs are also distinguished by the addition of various prefixes and suffixes, thus sgrub (present), bsgrubs (past), bsgrub (future), 'sgrubs (imperative). Though the final -s suffix, when used, is quite regular for the past and imperative, the specific prefixes to be used with any given verb are less predictable; while there is a clear pattern of b- for a past stem and g- for a future stem, this usage is not consistent.

Meaning	present	past	future	imperative
do	བྱེད་ byed	བྱས་ byas	བྱ་ bya	བྱོས་ byos
take	ལེན་ len	བླངས་ blangs	བླང་ blang	ལོངས་ longs
take	འཛིན་ 'dzin	བཟུངས་ bzungs	གཟུང་ gzung	ཟུངས་ zungs
accomplish	སྒྲུབ་ sgrub	བསྒྲུབས་ bsgrubs	བསྒྲུབ་ bsgrub	སྒྲུབས་ sgrubs

Only a limited number of verbs are capable of four changes; some cannot assume more than three, some two, and many only one. This relative deficiency is made up by the addition of auxiliaries or suffixes both in the classical language and in the modern dialects.

==== Negation ====
Verbs are negated by two prepositional particles: mi and ma. Mi is used with present and future stems. The particle ma is used with the past stem; prohibitions do not employ the imperative stem, rather the present stem is negated with ma. There is also a negative stative verb med 'there is not, there does not exist', the counterpart to the stative verb yod 'there is, there exists'.

==== Honorifics ====
As with nouns, Tibetan also has a complex system of honorific and polite verbal forms. Thus, many verbs for everyday actions have a completely different form to express the superior status, whether actual or out of courtesy, of the agent of the action, thus lta 'see', hon. gzigs; byed 'do', hon. mdzad. Where a specific honorific verb stem does not exist, the same effect is brought about by compounding a standard verbal stem with an appropriate general honorific stem such as mdzad.

== See also ==
- Lhasa Tibetan
- Old Tibetan
