= Georg von der Gabelentz =

19th century German linguist

Georg von der Gabelentz (16 March 1840 – 11 December 1893) was a German general linguist and sinologist. His Chinesische Grammatik (1881), according to a critic, "remains until today recognized as probably the finest overall grammatical survey of the Classical Chinese language to date." (Harbsmeier 1995:333)

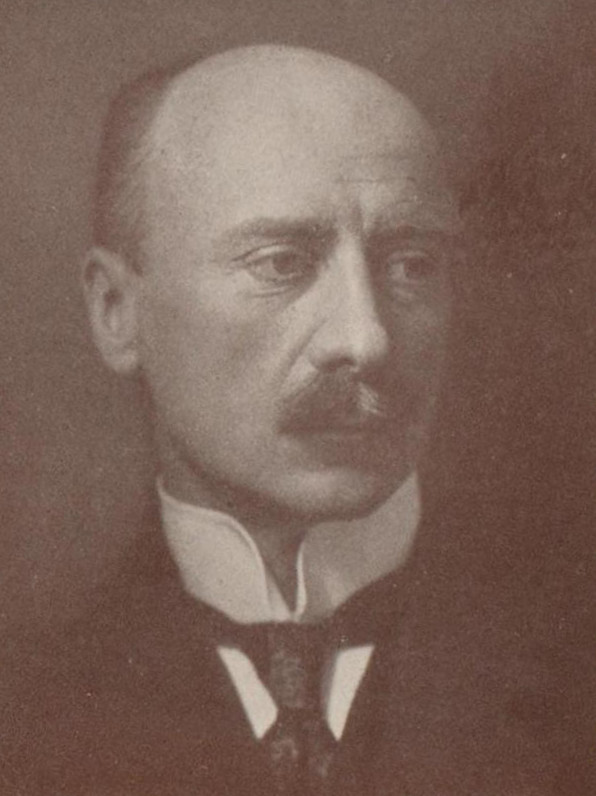
A portrait of Georg von der Gabelentz

== Biography ==
Gabelentz was born in Poschwitz, near Altenburg, Saxe-Altenburg. His father was the minister and linguist Hans Conon von der Gabelentz, an authority of the Manchu language. Gabelentz taught himself Dutch, Italian and Chinese during his gymnasium years.

From 1860 to 1864, following his father's steps, he studied law, administration, and linguistics at Jena. In 1864 he entered the civil service of Saxony at Dresden. He continued his study of oriental languages at Leipzig. He married Alexandra von Rothkirch in 1872. His father Hans died at the family castle of Lemnitz in 1874.

Gabelentz earned his doctoral from Dresden in 1876 with a translation of Zhou Dunyi's Taiji Tushuo (太極圖說 "Explaining taiji"). In 1878, a Professorship of Far Eastern Languages, the first of its kind in the German-speaking world, was created at the University of Leipzig, and Gabelentz was invited to fill it. Among his students were the German sinologists Wilhelm Grube (1855–1908) and Johann Jakob Maria de Groot (1854–1921), the Austrian Sinologist Arthur von Rosthorn (1862–1945), the Japanologist Karl Florenz (1865–1939), the archaeologist Max Uhle (1856–1944), the Tibetologist Heinrich Wenzel and the art historian Friedrich Wilhelm Karl Müller (1863–1930).

In 1889, he divorced, and switched to the University of Berlin. In 1891, he remarried, and published Die Sprachwissenschaft ("Linguistics"). His Handbuch zur Aufnahme fremder Sprachen followed one year later.

== Views on Chinese dialects ==
Gabelentz criticized the Beijing dialect which dominated the linguistic scene in China. A more suitable Chinese dialect in Gabelentz's view for science was the Nanjing dialect rather than Beijing.

Only in recent times has the northern dialect, pek-kuān-hoá, in the form [spoken] in the capital, kīng-hoá, begun to strive for general acceptance, and the struggle seems to be decided in its favor. It is preferred by the officials and studied by the European diplomats. Scholarship must not follow this practise. The Peking dialect is phonetically the poorest of all dialects and therefore has the most homophones. This is why it is most unsuitable for scientific purposes.

—Chinesische Grammatik (1881)

Gabelentz died in Berlin.

== Works written by Gabelentz ==
- Georg von der Gabelentz (1881). Chinesische Grammatik: Mit Ausschluss des niederen Stiles und der heutigen Umgangssprache (in German). Leipzig: T.O. Weigel. p. 552.
- Georg von der Gabelentz (1883). Anfangsgründe der chinesischen grammatik, mit Übungsstücken (in German). Leipzig: T. O. Weigel. p. 150 – via Google Books.

== Sources ==
- Elffers, Els (2008). "Georg von der Gabelentz and the rise of General Linguistics", in Ontheven aan de tijd. Linguïstisch-historische studies voor Jan Noordegraaf bij zijn zestigste verjaardag. Ed. by Lo van Driel & Theo Janssen. Stichting Neerlandistiek VU, Amsterdam & Nodus Publikationen, Münster, pp. 191–200.
- Harbsmeier, Christoph (1995). "John Webb and the Early History of the Study of the Classical Chinese Language in the West", in Ming Wilson & John Cayley (ed.s), Europe Studies China: Papers from an International Conference on the History of European Sinology, London: Han-Shan Tang Books, pp. 297–338.
- Honey, David B. (2001). Incense at the Altar: Pioneering Sinologists and the Development of Classical Chinese Philology. New Haven: American Oriental Society.
