= WordReference.com =

Online translation dictionary

- Website type: Online language dictionary
- Available in: English, French, Spanish, Italian, German, Russian, Portuguese, Dutch, Polish, Swedish, Japanese, Chinese, Arabic, Korean, Romanian, Turkish, Czech, Greek
- Owner: Michael Kellogg
- Creator: Michael Kellogg
- Website: wordreference.com
- Registration: No
- Launched: 1999; 27 years ago
- Current status: Active

WordReference Forums
- Website type: Internet forum and Online dictionary
- Owner: Michael Kellogg
- Creator: Michael Kellogg
- Website: forum.wordreference.com www.wordreference.com
- Registration: Yes
- Launched: 2004; 22 years ago

WordReference is an online translation dictionary for, among others, the language pairs English–French, English–Italian, English–Spanish, French–Spanish, Spanish–Portuguese and English–Portuguese.

WordReference formerly had Oxford Unabridged and Concise dictionaries available for a subscription. These dictionaries contained more translations than the free ones. In 2008, the price was €30 (US$44) per year.

As of June 2008, more language pairs had been created: English–German, English–Russian, English–Polish, English–Romanian, English–Czech, English–Greek, English–Turkish, English–Chinese, English–Japanese, English–Korean, English–Arabic. Dutch, Icelandic and Swedish have since been added.

The website features publicly accessible forums allowing registered users to ask questions about vocabulary and grammar. It also has monolingual dictionaries with definitions in English, Spanish, Italian and German.
