= Heinrich Wenzel =

German orientalist (1855–1893)

Heinrich Wenzel (7 June 1855, in Mainz – 16 June 1893, in London) was a German Indologist and Tibetologist.

He studied at the universities of Jena, Leipzig and Tübingen, receiving his doctorate at the latter institution with a thesis on the instrumental case involving the Rigveda (1879). By way of a recommendation from Ludwig Noiré, he continued his Oriental studies in Oxford under Max Müller. While here, he focused his attention on the then little-known Tibetan language and literature. From 1881 he spent the next two years in Herrnhut, where he studied Tibetology with Moravian missionary Heinrich August Jäschke. In 1883 Wenzel published the second edition of Jäschke's "Tibetan grammar".

In 1886, he obtained his habilitation at Leipzig with a translation of Nāgārjuna's "Suhṛllekha". Later on, he returned to England, initially residing in Oxford, eventually settling in London. Among his writings were translations of works by Russian scholars. He reportedly was fluent in a dozen different languages.

== Selected works ==
- Über den Instrumentalis im Rigveda. Tübingen 1879.
- "Tibetan grammar" by H. A. Jäschke, Moravian missionary. 2nd edition prepared by Dr. Heinrich Wenzel, London 1883.
- "Buddhist technical terms : an ancient Buddhist text ascribed to Nāgārjuna"; edited by F. Max Müller and H. Wenzel, 1885.
- "The Dharma-samgraha : an ancient collection of Buddhist technical terms"; edited by F. Max Muller, H. Wenzel, 1885.
- Suhrillekha. Brief des Nāgārjuna an König Udayana; translation by Heinrich Wenzel. Leipzig 1886.
- "List of the Tibetan mss. and printed books in the library of the Royal Asiatic Society". JRAS 1892, S. 570—579.
- "The Buddhist sources of the (Old Slavonic) legend of the Twelve Dreams of Shahaïsh", Dr. Sergey Oldenburg, translated by Heinrich Wenzel, JRAS 1893, S. 509—516.
