= Tektology =

Precursor of systems theory

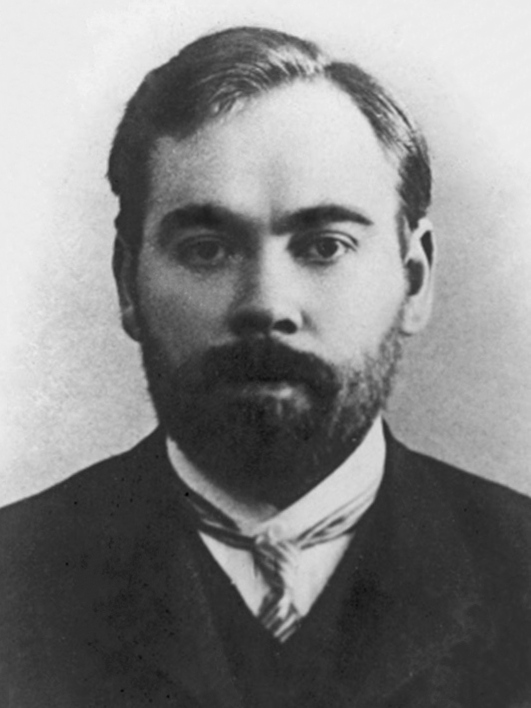
Alexander Bogdanov, founder of tektology

Tektology (sometimes transliterated as tectology) is a term used by Alexander Bogdanov to describe a new universal science that consisted of unifying all social, biological and physical sciences by considering them as systems of relationships and by seeking the organizational principles that underlie all systems. Tektology is now regarded as a precursor of systems theory and related aspects of synergetics. The word "tectology" was introduced by Ernst Haeckel, but Bogdanov used it for a different purpose.

== Overview ==
His work Tektology: Universal Organization Science, published in Russia between 1912 and 1917, anticipated many of the ideas that were popularized later by Norbert Wiener in Cybernetics and Ludwig von Bertalanffy in the General Systems Theory. There are suggestions that both Wiener and von Bertalanffy might have read the German edition of Tektology which was published in 1928.

In Sources and Precursors of Bogdanov's Tectology, James White (1998) acknowledged the intellectual debt of Bogdanov's work on tectology to the ideas of Ludwig Noiré. His work drew on the ideas of Noiré who in the 1870s also attempted to construct a monistic system using the principle of conservation of energy as one of its structural elements.

More recently, in her 2016 book Molecular Red: Theory for the Anthropocene, McKenzie Wark attempts to establish Bogdanov as a precursor to contemporary Anthropocene theorists, like Donna Haraway, by considering Bogdanov's works of fiction as an extension of his general work in Tectology. In this, Wark also considers Tectology as an alternative to the Soviet state philosophy of dialectical materialism, which may help in explaining Lenin's vehement opposition to Tectology in his own Materialism and Empirio-Criticism.

== Topics in tectology ==
According to Bogdanov "the aim of Tectology is the systematization of organized experience", through the identification of universal organizational principles: "all things are organizational, all complexes could only be understood through their organizational character." Bogdanov considered that any complex should correspond to its environment and adapt to it. A stable and organized complex is greater than the sum of its parts. In Tectology, the term 'stability' refers not to a dynamic stability, but to the possibility of preserving the complex in the given environment. A 'complex' is not identical to a 'complicated, a hard-to-comprehend, large unit.

In Tectology, Bogdanov made the first 'modern' attempt to formulate the most general laws of organization. Tectology addressed issues such as holistic, emergent phenomena and systemic development. Tectology as a constructive science built elements into a functional entity using general laws of organization.

According to his "empirio-monistic" principle (1899), he does not recognize differences between observation and perception and thus creates the beginning of a general empirical, trans-disciplinary science of physical organization, as an expedient unity and precursor of Systems Theory and Holism.

The "whole" in Tectology, and the laws of its integrity, were derived from biological rather than the physicalistic view of the world. Regarding the three scientific cycles which comprise the basis of Tectology (mathematical, physico-biological, and natural-philosophical), it is from the physico-biological cycle that the central concepts have been taken and universalized.

The starting point in Bogdanov's Universal Science of Organization - Tectology (1913-1922) was that nature has a general, organized character, with one set of laws of organization for all objects. This set of laws also organizes the internal development of the complex units, as implied by Simona Poustilnik's "macro-paradigm", which induces synergistic consequences into an adaptive assembling phenomenon (1995). Bogdanov's visionary view of nature was one of an 'organization' with interconnected systems.

== Works ==
Alexander Bogdanov wrote several works about Tectology:

- 1901, Poznanie s Istoricheskoi Tochki Zreniya (Knowledge from a Historical Viewpoint), St. Petersburg, 1901.
- 1904, Empiriomonizm: Stat'i po Filosofii (Empiriomonism: Articles on Philosophy) in 3 volumes, Moscow, 1904-1906
- 1912, Filosofiya Zhivogo Opyta: Populiarnye Ocherki (Philosophy of Living Experience: Popular Essays), St. Petersburg, 1912
- 1922 Tektologiya: Vseobschaya Organizatsionnaya Nauka in 3 volumes, Berlin and Petrograd-Moscow, 1922.
- 1980, English translation as Essays in Tektology: The General Science of Organization, trans. George Gorelik, Seaside, CA, Intersystems Publications, 1980.
