= Seal of Biliteracy =

United States high school educational award

- Awarded for: Knowledge of two languages by high school graduation.
- Country: United States
- First award: 2011
- Website: sealofbiliteracy.org

The Seal of Biliteracy (SoBL) is an award granted by a school, district, organization or state in the United States to recognize "students who have studied and attained proficiency in two or more languages by high school graduation". The SoBL is meant to encourage students towards biliteracy in their first language and in a second language. One of the two languages must be English (or alternatively Hawaiian, if in Hawaii). It originated in California in 2008 and was formally adopted by the state in 2011. As of 2026, all 50 states and the District of Columbia offer a State Seal of Biliteracy. For adults, university students or students in schools unable to participate in a state program, the Global Seal of Biliteracy offers a Seal of Biliteracy language credential.

== About ==
The Seal of Biliteracy is an award given by a school, school district or county office of education in recognition of students who have studied and attained proficiency in two or more languages by high school graduation. The Seal of Biliteracy takes the form of a seal that appears on the transcript or diploma of the graduating senior and is a statement of accomplishment for future employers and for college admissions. In addition to the Seal of Biliteracy that marks attainment of high level mastery of two or more languages, schools and districts are also instituting Bilingual Pathway Awards, recognizing significant steps towards developing biliteracy along a student's trajectory from preschool into high school. While candidates for the Seal of Biliteracy must speak English, there are no restrictions on what their second language may be, as long as proficiency is achieved in all language domains such as listening, speaking, reading, and writing (or expression and reception for sign languages). Scholars such as Kristin J. Davin and Amy J. Heineke have stated that the program's benefits are stronger efforts for academic success, bilingualism, and official recognition for their efforts.

In the United States, biliteracy has not always been the method of teaching English to English Language Learners (ELLs). In the past ELLs learned through the Sink or Swim method of total English immersion education, not having culturally relevant testing questions, or equitable assessment in schools. The intent behind the SoBL is that it will "offer a promising policy solution to increase biliteracy among K–12 students, both as a means to promote the maintenance of students' home languages and encourage native English speakers to study additional languages" and make them "attractive to future employers".

== History and eligibility ==
The SoBL was first developed in California in 2008 by Californians Together and was implemented in 2010 along with Velázquez Press. In 2011, legislation creating a California State Seal of Biliteracy was passed. Since then, it has been adopted by multiple states, and each state has established its own award criteria. It is only awarded to students in the public school system; students in private schools are generally not eligible. The SoBL has been adopted into legislature in multiple states and the District of Columbia, however elements defined as barriers to success by students include a lack of awareness of the Seal and the assessment exams needed to obtain the Seal. Many students expressed a lack of awareness and preparedness until their senior year of high school, and this made them ineligible for the seal. Research suggests that successful programs implement benchmark testing and provide Seal of Biliteracy program information on school websites.

=== Areas and date of adoption ===
Year adopted	States	Notes
2011	California	Originally created in 2008
2013	Illinois, Texas, New York	
2014	New Mexico, Washington, Louisiana, Minnesota, District of Columbia	
2015	North Carolina, Indiana, Virginia, Nevada, Hawaii, Wisconsin, Utah	
2016	New Jersey, Oregon, Maryland, Florida, Georgia, Kansas, Arizona, Rhode Island	
2017	Colorado, Ohio, Missouri, Delaware, Connecticut, Massachusetts	
2018	Arkansas, Iowa, Michigan, Tennessee, South Carolina, Maine	
2019	North Dakota, Mississippi	
2020	Nebraska, Idaho	
2022	Pennsylvania	
