= Bilingual dictionary =

Dictionary translating between two languages

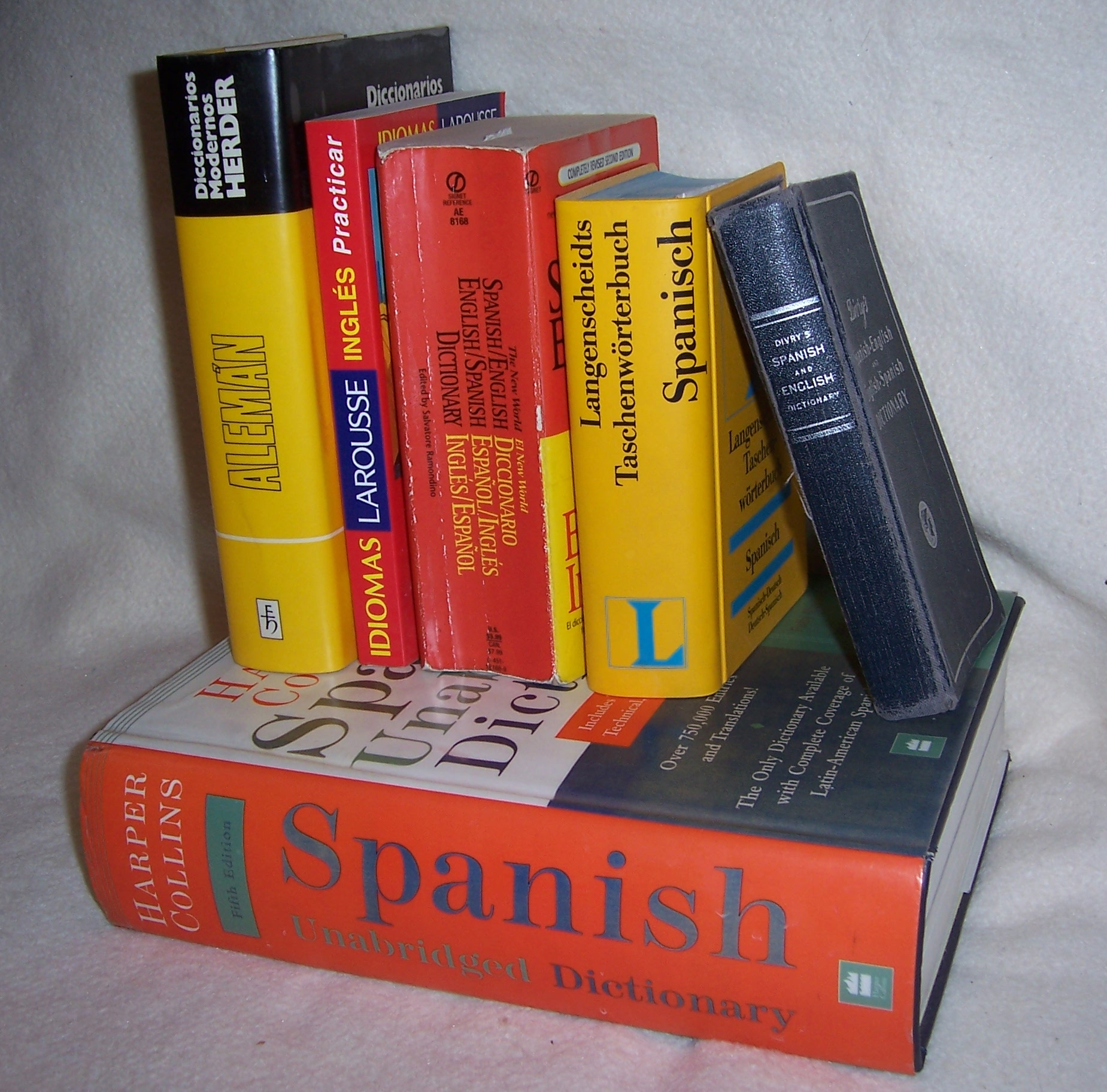
Printed bilingual dictionaries come in all sizes and shapes.

A bilingual dictionary or translation dictionary is a specialized dictionary used to translate words or phrases from one language to another. Bilingual dictionaries can be unidirectional, meaning that they list the meanings of words of one language in another, or can be bidirectional, allowing translation to and from both languages. Bidirectional bilingual dictionaries usually consist of two sections, each listing words and phrases of one language along with their translation. In addition to the translation, a bilingual dictionary usually indicates the part of speech, gender, verb type, declension model and other grammatical clues to help a non-native speaker use the word. Other features sometimes present in bilingual dictionaries are lists of phrases, usage and style guides, verb tables, maps and grammar references. In contrast to the bilingual dictionary, a monolingual dictionary defines words and phrases instead of translating them.

== History ==
The Roman Emperor Claudius (10 BCE – 54 CE) is known to have compiled an Etruscan-Latin dictionary, now lost.

One substantial bilingual dictionary was the Mahāvyutpatti. The Mahāvyutpatti (Wylie: Bye-brtag-tu rtogs-par byed-pa chen-po), The Great Volume of Precise Understanding or Essential Etymology, was compiled in Tibet during the late eighth to early ninth centuries CE, providing a dictionary composed of thousands of Sanskrit and Tibetan terms designed as means to provide standardised Buddhist texts in Tibetan, and is included as part of the Tibetan Tangyur (Toh. 4346). The Madhyavyutpatti was used in conjunction.

Dictionaries from Hebrew and Aramaic into medieval French were composed in the European Jewish communities in the 10th century CE. These were used for understanding and teaching the Talmud and other Jewish texts.

== Challenges ==
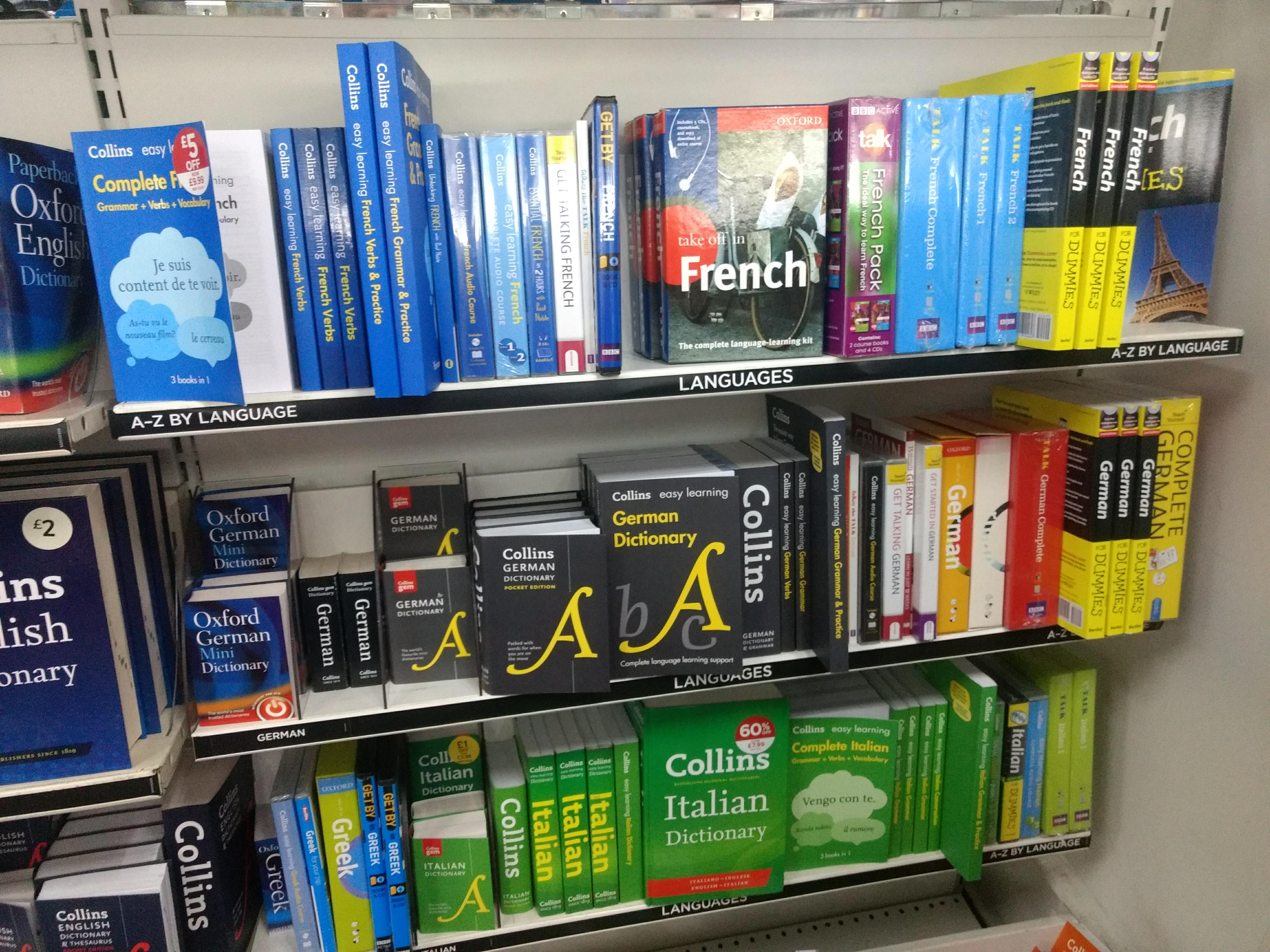
A selection of translation dictionaries published by Collins

The most important challenge for practical and theoretical lexicographers is to define the functions of a bilingual dictionary. A bilingual dictionary works to help users translate texts from one language into another or to help users understand foreign-language texts. In such situations users will require the dictionary to contain different types of data that have been specifically selected for the function in question. If the function is understanding foreign-language texts the dictionary will contain foreign-language entry words and native-language definitions, which have been written so that they can be understood by the intended user groups. If the dictionary is intended to help translate texts, it will need to include not only equivalents but also collocations and phrases translated into the relevant target language. It has also been shown that specialized translation dictionaries for learners should include data that help users translate difficult syntactical structures as well as language-specific genre conventions.

In standard lexicographic terminology, a bilingual dictionary definition provides a "translation equivalent" – "An expression from a language which has the same meaning as, or can be used in a similar context to, one from another language, and can therefore be used to translate it." The British lexicographer Robert Ilson gives example definitions from the Collins-Robert French-English English-French Dictionary. Since French chien = English dog and dog = chien, chien and dog are translation equivalents; but since garde champêtre = rural policeman and rural policeman is not included in the English-French dictionary, they are not culturally equivalent.

Both phrases can be understood reasonably well from their constituents and have fairly obvious contrasts with garde urbain in French or with urban policeman in English. But garde champêtre has a specific unpredictable contrast within the lexical system of French: it contrasts with gendarme. Both are policemen. But a gendarme is a member of a national police force that is technically part of the French Army whereas a garde champêtre is employed by a local commune. Rural policeman has no such contrast.

Perhaps the most difficult aspect of creating a bilingual dictionary is the fact that lexemes or words cover more than one area of meaning, but these multiple meanings do not correspond to a single word in the target language. For example, in English, a ticket can provide entrance to a movie theater, authorize a bus or train ride, or can be given to you by a police officer for exceeding the posted speed limit. In Spanish these three meanings are not covered by one word as in English, but rather there are several options: boleto or entrada and infracción/multa, and in French with billet or ticket and procès-verbal, or in German by Eintrittskarte or Fahrkarte and Mahnung/Bußgeldbescheid.

Recently, an automatic method for the disambiguation of the entries of bilingual dictionaries has been proposed that makes use of specific kinds of graphs. As a result, translations in each entry of the dictionary are assigned the specific sense (i.e., meaning) they refer to. Open-source software for generating bilingual dictionaries automatically is also available, such as the ApertiumBidixGen project.

== Usage ==
To mitigate the problem of one word having multiple meanings and its translation having multiple, but not necessarily corresponding meanings, the user should perform a reverse lookup. In the above-mentioned example in English and Spanish of the word ticket, after finding that ticket is translated into boleto and infracción in the English–Spanish dictionary, both of those Spanish words can be looked up in the Spanish-English section to help to identify which one has the meaning being sought. Reverse lookups can usually be performed faster with dictionary programs and online dictionaries.

== Formats ==
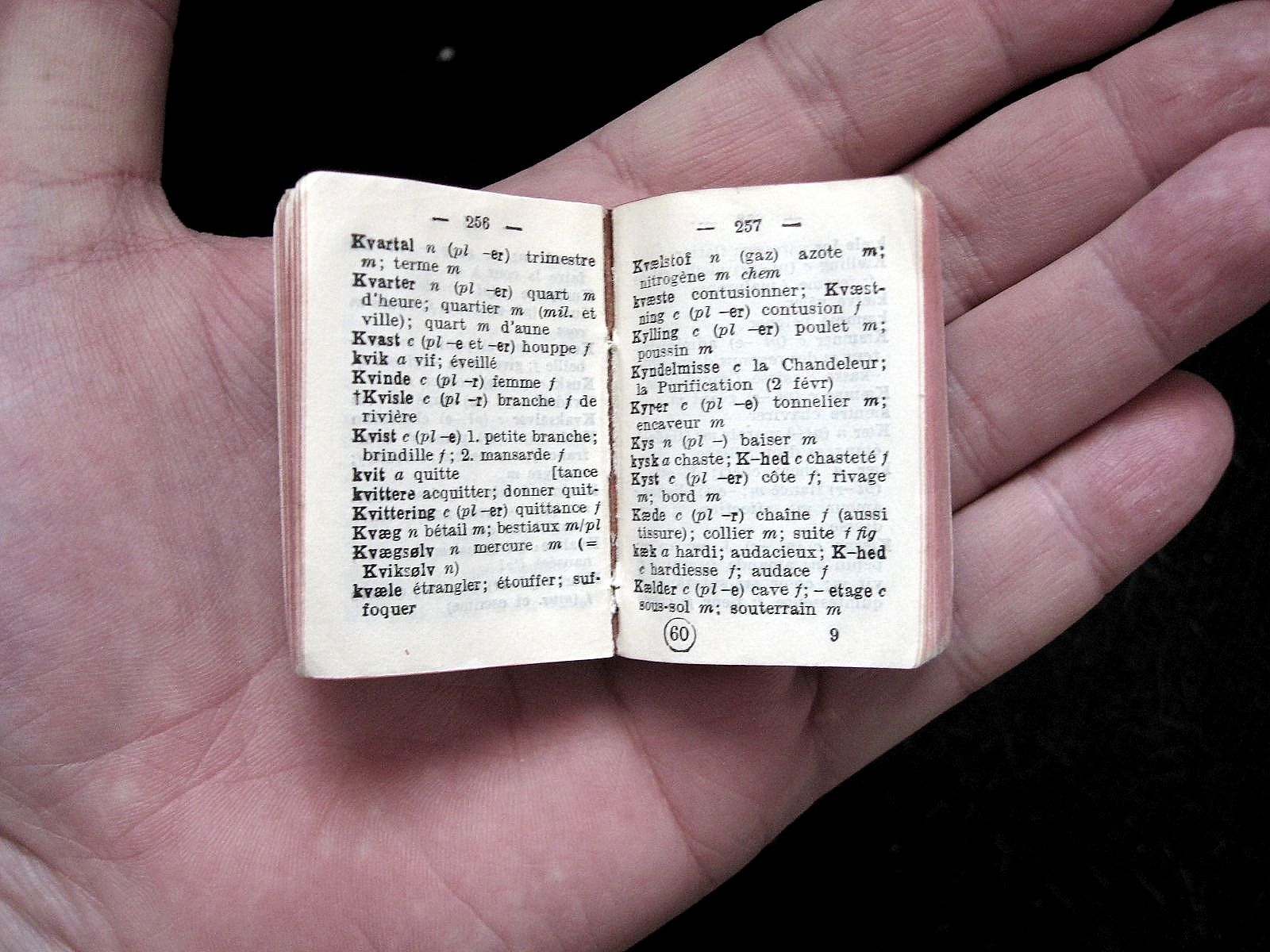
A miniature Danish–French dictionary

Bilingual dictionaries are available in a number of formats, and often include a grammar reference and usage examples, for instance, the Yadgar Sindhi to English Dictionary.

- Printed dictionaries – Printed dictionaries range from small pocket-sized editions to large, comprehensive multi-volume works.
- Handheld electronic dictionaries (also: pocket electronic dictionaries or PEDs) – Electronic dictionaries are small devices that receive input via a miniature keyboard, speech recognition or a scanning device that reads printed text, and outputs the translation on a small LCD screen or speaks the translation audibly.
- Dictionary programs – Software that allows words or phrases to be input and translated on computers and smart phones.
- Online dictionaries – Online dictionaries similar to dictionary programs, these are often easy to search, but not always free to use, and in some cases lack the accuracy (particularly in open collaborative dictionaries), or scope of printed and electronic dictionaries.
- Visual dictionaries – A visual dictionary is a printed dictionary that relies primarily on illustrations to provide the user with a reliable way of identifying the correct translation. Visual dictionaries are often multi-lingual rather than bilingual—instead of containing translations between two languages they often cover four or more languages.

== Distribution ==
Bilingual dictionaries are available for nearly every combination of popular languages. They also often exist between language pairs where one language is popular and the other is not. Bilingual dictionaries between two uncommon languages are much less likely to exist.

== Multilingual dictionaries ==
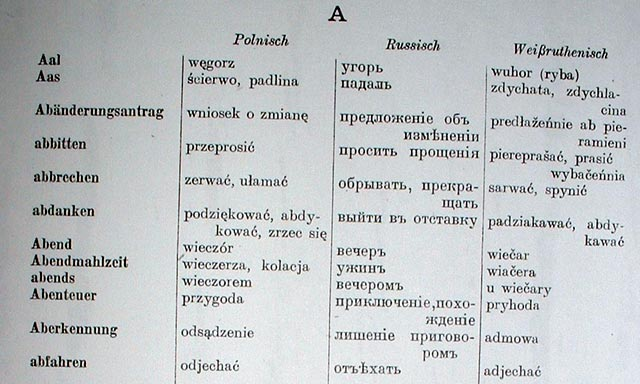
A 1918 multilingual dictionary from German (left) into Polish, Russian and Belarusian

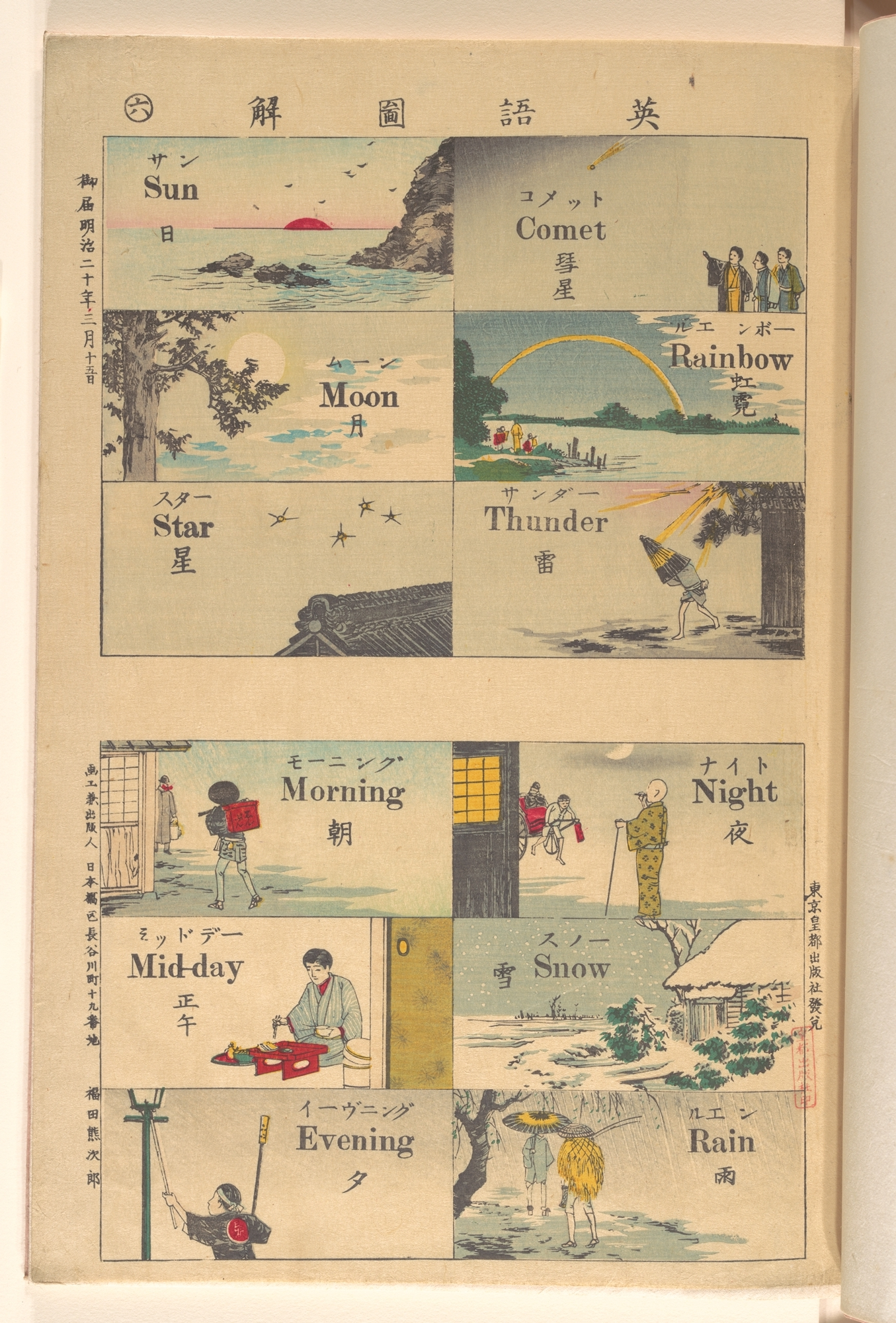
A 1887 visual dictionary from Japan, in English, kanji and katakana Japanese

Multilingual dictionaries are closely related to bilingual dictionaries. In a multilingual dictionary, a person looks up a word or phrase in one language and is presented with the translation in several languages. Multilingual dictionaries can be arranged alphabetically or words can be grouped by topic. When grouped by topic, a multilingual dictionary can be presented as a phrase book, or illustrated in the form of a visual dictionary.

== Publishers ==
There are many publishers and manufacturers of both printed and electronic bilingual dictionaries. For example:

- Ectaco
- Velazquez Press
- Franklin Electronic Publishers
- HarperCollins
- Langenscheidt
- Reverso
- Collins-Robert
- Larousse
- Merriam-Webster
- SYSTRAN

== See also ==
- Babel Fish (website)
- Bescherelle, a type of grammar reference book for conjugating verbs
- Computer-assisted translation
- Foreign-language writing aid
- Lexical Markup Framework
- List of online dictionaries
- Machine translation
- Mariano Velazquez de la Cadena (Spanish-English bilingual dictionary author)
- Parallel text
- Phrase book
