= Mariano Velazquez de la Cadena =

Mexican grammarian, scholar, and author

Mariano Velázquez (June 28, 1778 – February 19, 1860), (full name Mariano Velázquez de la Cadena) was a Mexican grammarian, scholar, and author in the 19th century. He was appointed Professor of Spanish Language and Literature at Columbia College in 1830, a position that he held until his death in 1861.

== Early life ==
Velazquez was born in Mexico City, a descendant of Don Antonio De La Cadena Maluenda (Anusim), Treasurer of New Spain 1525. At age seven, he was sent away to Madrid to pursue his education. In Madrid, he was admitted to the Royal Seminary of Nobles, where he studied philosophy and law until he graduated in 1799.

== Public service ==
Although not of legal age, Velázquez was admitted, by special royal order, to the Council of the Indies in 1800. He held the position of notary while serving the council and was also appointed curator of the estates of minors and interstate estates for the viceroyalty of Mexico. In 1802, he was recalled from the council to become King Charles IV's private secretary. As such, he was sent to represent the king at the 1804 coronation of Napoleon. His position allowed him to make a tour through western and central Europe. Velázquez resigned his post after Charles IV was forced to abdicate and later imprisoned by Napoleon in 1809. After receiving news of Hidalgo's Mexican independence movement, he made arrangements to return to Mexico. Velazquez was unwilling to identify with either of the contending parties and thus resolved to settle in New York, where his scholarly career began.

== Language Contributions ==
Once in New York City, Velazquez devoted himself to one of his greatest passions—language. He taught Spanish and founded a collegiate institute where many young Latin American men were educated. Velázquez also joined the faculty of Columbia University to teach Castilian (Spanish) language and literature. Aside from teaching, he was a member of learned societies in Europe and the United States and author of Spanish school-books and Spanish-English language dictionaries. Some of his English, Spanish, and German works include: Dufief's, Ellendorff's New Method, An Easy Introduction to Spanish Conversation, New Spanish Reader, A New Method of Learning to Read, Write, and Speak the Spanish Language, Elementos de la lengua castellana fundados en los principios establecidos por la academia española y en el uso de los autores clásicos, and Spanisches Lesebuch: Enthaltend ausgewählte Stücke aus Spanischen Musterschriftststellern in gebundener und ungebundener Rede.

== Legacy ==
In 1852, Velázquez used Mateo Seoane's edition of the revered Neumon and Baretti Dictionary of the Spanish and English Languages as a basis for his version, A Pronouncing Dictionary of the Spanish and English Languages. Velázquez's dictionary became the preeminent authority in Spanish-English dictionaries, giving editors and publishers the model for Spanish-English dictionaries. Edward Gray revised the first edition, creating A New Pronouncing Dictionary of the Spanish and English Languages almost a half century later. Several revisions have been made to Velazquez's first edition, the most recent by Velázquez Press in 2003, helping it remain a venerable dictionary throughout the world.
