= Simona Poustilnik =

Russian scientist

Simona Poustilnik (Russian: Симона Пустильник) is a Russian biologist, philosopher, historian of science, and is also a science journalist. She has a PhD in the history of Russian science from the Institute for the History of Science and Technology, Moscow, Russian Academy of Sciences. Her major research is in the area of the history of Russian science, particularly of system theory, Bogdanov's tectology, and Russian cosmism. She lives and works in London. She is a member of the British Society for the History of Science and the Authors and Publicists International Association. She is the author of the blog "London and life".

== Research interests ==
Her main research interests are on the history of 20th-century Russian science and philosophy (particularly, systems theory, evolutionary theory and Bolshevistic science). Her special interest is Bogdanov's Tektology, Russian Darwinism and development of proletarian science during the first postrevolutionary decades. Now she is working on an international project, exploring interactions among science, and filmmaking in Bolshevik Russia, focusing on the relationships between system thinking in Russia and Soviet Constructivism.

In her research she is connecting the understanding of the Russian Darwinists of “natural podbor” as ‘fine-tuning’ by nature and Bogdanov’s concept of tektological ‘podbor’ (‘assembling’) as the universal mechanism of the construction of any organization.

As Simona Poustlinik commented at a recent conference on Bogdanov:

It is remarkable the extent to which Bogdanov anticipated the ideas which were to be developed in systems thinking later in the twentieth century. He anticipated not only a general theory of systems and cybernetics, but also ideas which entered into systems science in the late decades and which are associated with the names of Prigogine, Jantsch and Maturana.

== Selected publications ==
Approximately sixty papers and monographs have been published, The following represent a selection of papers published in English and Russian:

- “Poustilnik, Simona. Aleksandr Bogdanov’s Tektology: A Proletarian Science of Construction” (2021) in CULTURAL SCIENCE JOURNAL 13(1), 2021, pp. 140–151
- “Bogdanov’s Tektology: A Science of Construction” (2016) in Early Soviet Thought: Bogdanov, Eisenstein and the Proletkult, Spherical Book I. Tangential Points Publication Series. Editor-in-Chief: Pia Tikka; Editorial Board: John Biggart, Vesa Oittinen, Giulia Rispoli, Maja Soboleva. Helsinki, Espoo: Aalto University. ISBN 978-952-60-0076-3
- Poustilnik, S. Tectology in the Context of Intellectual Thought in Russia (Alexandr Bogdanov Revisited, University of Helsinki, Aleksanteri Series, 1/2009, pp. 105–137).
- Poustilnik, S. Alexander Bogdanov and the Genesis of the Systems Theory ( Alexander Bogdanov, Specimina Philologiae Slavicae, University of Marburg, Munchen, 2008, pp. 116–140).
- Poustilnik, S. Умолчание об авариях часто оправдывали секретностью (in Russian). In Nesavisimaja gaseta, 2016, N 04.
- Poustilnik, S. Какие яблони будут цвести на Марсе (in Russian). In Nesavisimaja gaseta, 2015, N 09.
- Poustilnik, S. Человечества сны золотые... (in Russian). In Nesavisimaja gaseta, 2015, N 05.
- Poustilnik, S. Наука для лучшего мира (in Russian). In Nesavisimaja gaseta, 2013, N 11.
- Poustilnik, S. Теория чепухи и зазеркалья: Почему Алиса задает слишком умные вопросы (in Russian). In Nesavisimaja gaseta, 2013, N 06.
- Poustilnik, S. Чисто английская доктрина (in Russian). In Nesavisimaja gaseta, 2009, N 02.
- Poustilnik, S. The vegetable of Proletarian Revolution (in Russian). In Nesavisimaja gaseta, 2004, N 10.
- Poustilnik, S. The role of gender in evolution of the man. (in Russian). In Nesavisimaja gaseta, 2004, N 09.
- Poustilnik, S. Индейский матриархат (Indian Matiarchy), (2004) article about Iroquois gender relations published in Nezavisimaya gazeta, 2004, N 06.
- Poustilnik, S. Hamlet from Red Star (in Russian). In Nesavisimaja gaseta, 2002. N 12
- Poustilnik, S. Biological Ideas in Tektology and Discussion Papers. In Alexander Bogdanov and the Origins of Systems Thinking in Russia. 1998. pp. 63–73, 112-116, 127-128, 216-217, 313, 314., 1998, Ashgate, UK.
- Poustilnik, S. (and Dudley P.) Modern Systems Science: Variations on a Theme? Center for Systems Studies, Research Memorandum, 1996, No 11, 20 p., Hull, UK
- Poustilnik, S. (and Dudley P.) Reading the Tektology: Provisional Findings, Postulates and Research Directions, Center for Systems Studies, Research Memorandum, 1995, N 7, 20 p., Hull, UK
- Poustilnik, S. Bogdanov's Tektology: Between Science and Philosophy. In Filosofskie issledovanija, Moscow, 1995, N 3, pp. 226–241
- Poustilnik, S. Principle of Assemblage as Base of A. Bogdanov's Concept) In Voprosy filosofii, Moscow, 1995, N 8, pp. 24–30
- Poustilnik, S. The Ideas of Evolution in A. Bogdanov's Tektology. In The Concept of Self-Organization in a Historical Perspective, 1994, Moscow, Nauka, pp. 189–198
- Poustilnik, S. Ivan Pavlov. //Science in the USSR, 1987. N 3, pp. 100–107.
- Poustilnik, S. Returned life. In Science in the USSR, 1988. N 5, pp. 40–43.
- Poustilnik, S. Evolution of Immunity. In Science in the USSR, 1989. N 2, pp. 127–128.
