= Madhyavyutpatti =

Madhyavyutpatti (Wylie: sGra sbyor bam po gñis pa) is a Sanskrit-Tibetan lexicon.

In the eighth century CE, Buddhism was being introduced to Tibet. Buddhist texts were written in Sanskrit, and thus had to be translated. To facilitate the translation, the Tibetan emperor Trisong Detsen sponsored the creation of two texts, the Mahāvyutpatti and the Madhyavyutpatti. The former was a glossary and the latter explained some entries of the former and gave general principles to use when translating. Both texts were completed during the reign of Tride Songtsen from 799-815.

These two scrolls were used as reference text for translating Sanskrit sutras into Tibetan language during Trisong Detsen's rule of Tibet during the early dissemination times. They were used along with Mahavyutpatti, which standardized the translation rules along with its pronunciation from various Sanskrit scrolls or exposition of sutra, vinaya, abhidharma, and even mantras and dharanis.
