= Ludwig Noiré =

German philosopher

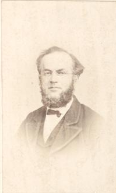
Ludwig Noiré, in 1876

Ludwig Noiré (26 March 1829 – 27 March 1889) was a German philosopher, known for his studies involving the philosophy of language. He was born in Alzey.

He received his education at the University of Giessen, and later relocated to Mainz, where he worked as a grammar school teacher.

He saw the ability to speak as a genuine human ability and developed the theory that working together was the origin of language. Noiré was convinced that language is a precondition for thinking. The empirical proof thereof was criticized by Ernst Cassirer as irrevocably failed.

Alexander Bogdanov attributed some of his ideas, formalized as tektology, on the development of a monistic system to Ludwig Noiré.

Alexander Bogdanov used Noiré's theory that language originated in the collective labor cries of primeval people as the basis for defending the idea of historical materialism that "existence determines consciousness." That is, labor is the primary realm of the emergence of ideology. Bogdanov, himself, put it this way: "The initial roots of words were sounds that spontaneously burst out, connected with human activities. But these sounds must have signified actions, and were necessary so that all members of primordial society could ‘understand’ them – i.e. having heard a certain sound, they would think of a certain activity. This would automatically result from activities that were carried out together, collectively. Cries while working, which accompanied general labour, would be determined by the nature of the work: one cry with one act of labour, other cries with other acts of labour."

Noiré contributed an historical introduction to F. Max Müller’s 1881 translation of Kant’s Critique of Pure Reason. It was titled "The Critique of Pure Reason as Illustrated by a Sketch of the Development of Occidental Philosophy" and was over 300 pages long.

== Works ==
- Die Welt als Entwicklung des Geistes, 1874 – The world as a development of the spirit.
- Grundlagen einer zeitgemäßen Philosophie, 1875 – Foundation of a modern philosophy.
- Der monistische Gedanke. Eine Konkordanz der Philosophie Schopenhauers, Darwins, Robert Mayers und Lazarus Geigers, 1875 – The monistic idea. A concordance on the philosophy of Schopenhauer, Charles Darwin, Robert Mayer and Lazarus Geiger.
- Die Doppelnatur der Kausalität, 1876 – The double nature of causality.
- Einleitung und Begründung einer monistischen Erkenntnistheorie, 1877 – Introduction and creation of a monistic knowledge theory.
- Aphorismen zur monistischen Philosophie, 1877 – Aphorisms on monistic philosophy.
- Der Ursprung der Sprache, 1877 – The origin of language.
- Das Werkzeug und seine Bedeutung für die Entwicklungsgeschichte der Menschheit, 1880 – The tool and its importance for the history of human development.
- Die Lehre Kants und der Ursprung der Vernunft, 1882 – The doctrine of Kant and the origin of reason.
- Logos, Ursprung und Wesen der Begriffe, 1885 (translated as The origin and philosophy of language, 1917)
- Max Müller & the philosophy of language, (1879), London: Longmans, Green, & co.
- A sketch of the development of philosophic thought from Thales to Kant (1900) originally an introduction to Max Müller's translation of Kant's Critique of Pure Reason (Macmillan, 1881)
