= Egophoricity =

Linguistic encoding of personal knowledge

In linguistics, egophoricity refers to a grammatical category that marks one's personal involvement in an event. In languages with this category, an egophoric form is used for expressing information to which the self has "privileged access" as opposed to an allophoric (or non-egophoric) form.

Egophoric forms are typically associated with first-person subject declarative sentences and second-person subject interrogative sentences (egophoric distribution).

The concept of egophoricity was originally developed in descriptive studies on Tibeto-Burman languages spoken in the Himalayas such as Newar and Tibetan; however, the category has also been found in languages of Northwestern China, the Andean region, Caucasus, New Guinea, and elsewhere.

== Terminology ==
"Ego-" refers to "self" and "-phor" means "to carry".

The term "egophoric" was coined by French linguist Nicolas Tournadre in his description of Lhasa Tibetan although his former supervisor Claude Hagège had used "égophore" in a different sense prior to that.

Before "egophoricity" came into use in the literature, linguists often referred to the same phenomenon by the term conjunct and disjunct forms. The distinction between conjunct/disjunct was first made in Austin Hale's work on Kathmandu Newar.

== Overview ==
=== Distribution ===
Usually, the marking of egophoricity is correlated with grammatical person and sentence types: egophoric forms typically occur with the first-person subject in declarative sentences and the second-person subject in questions. By contrast, non-egophoric forms will appear in the other contexts. This pattern is called egophoric distribution.

Typical distribution of (non-)egophoric markers.
	Declarative	Interrogative
1st person	ego	non-ego
2nd person	non-ego	ego
3rd person	non-ego	non-ego

Unlike person agreement, however, the use of (non-)egophoric forms may not follow it under certain semantic or pragmatic situations.

=== Kathmandu Newar ===
Kathmandu Newar, a Tibeto-Burman language spoken in the capital of Nepal, has two past tense makers for verbs: the egophoric -ā and the non-egophoric -a. The former is normally used in first-person declaratives and second-person questions whereas the latter is applied to the other sentences:

Ji ana wanā.
1.SG.ABS there go.PST.EGO
"I went there."

Cha ana wana.
2.SG.ABS there go.PST.NEGO
"You went there."

Wa ana wana.
3.SG.ABS there go.PST.NEGO
"He went there."

Cha ana wanā lā?
2.SG.ABS there go.PST.EGO Q
"Did you go there?"

If the verb describes an unintentional action, however, the non-egophoric past tense marker will appear in first-person declaratives and second-person questions as well:

Jįį lā palā.
1.SG.ERG meat cut.PST.EGO
"I cut the meat (intentionally)."

Cha danā lā?
2.SG.ABS get-up.PST.EGO Q
"Did you get up (voluntarily)?"

Jįį lā pala.
1.SG.ERG meat cut.PST.NEGO
"I cut the meat (quite by accident)."

Cha dana lā?
2.SG.ABS get-up.PST.NEGO Q
"Did you get up (involuntarily)?"

While the third person subject usually takes the non-egophoric marker both in declaratives and interrogatives, the egophoric counterpart will be used in indirect speech if the main and subordinate clauses share the same subject:

Wа̨а̨ wa ana wanā dhakāā dhāla.
3.SG.ERG 3.SG.ABS there go.PST.EGO QUOT say.PST.NEGO
"He said that he went there (himself)."

Wа̨а̨ wa ana wana dhakāā dhāla.
3.SG.ERG 3.SG.ABS there go.PST.NEGO QUOT say.PST.NEGO
"He said that he (someone else) went there."

=== Lhasa Tibetan ===
Lhasa Tibetan, another Tibeto-Burman language, has a system of verb endings that express evidentiality and/or egophoricity.

	Egophoric	Factual (non-egophoric)	Evidential	
	Egophoric	Factual (non-egophoric)	Direct	Inferential
Perfective	-pa yin	-pa red	-song	-zhag
Perfect	-yod	-yog red	-‘dug	-zhag
Imperfective	-gi yod	-gi yog red	-gi ’dug / -gis	
Future	-gi yin	-gi red		

In a nominal construction, the egophoric copulae (e.g. yin) and the non-egophoric ones (e.g. red) are used in accordance with the egophoric distribution:

nga bod=pa yin
1.SG Tibetan COP.EGO
"I am Tibetan."

kho bod=pa red
3.SG Tibetan COP.NEGO
"He is Tibetan."

khyed=rang bod=pa yin pas
2.SG.HON Tibetan COP.EGO Q
"Are you Tibetan?"

nga rgya=mi red pas
1.SG Chinese COP.NEGO Q
"Am I Chinese?"

However, the distinction between yin and red may also be made according to voluntariness of an action as in Kathmandu Newar. Likewise, the third-person subject in indirect speech is marked by an egophoric marker if it is co-referential with the subject of the main clause.

Also, the third-person subject takes an egophoric marker when the speaker emphasizes their personal involvement in the information conveyed in the statement.

kho nga’i bu red
3.SG 1.SG.GEN son COP.NEGO
"He is my son." (e.g. answering "who is he?")

kho nga’i bu yin
3.SG 1.SG.GEN son COP.EGO
"He is my son." (e.g. answering "whose son is he?")

== Interaction with other categories ==
=== Evidentiality ===
In a language like Lhasa Tibetan, egophoricity is part of its evidential system as the egophoric copula occupies the same slot as the allophoric and the evidential. This is not the case for languages such as Kathmandu Newar, where the two categories are expressed separately.

=== Mirativity ===
Languages like Akha have paradigmatic structure of mirative and egophoric marking, which suggests both categories can interact with each other.

=== Person ===
Few languages deploy grammatical person and egophoric marking at the same time. Still, cohabitation of both categories is reported in Japhug, a Rgyalrongic language of Sichuan.

== Geographical Distribution ==
=== Himalayas and Western China ===
Aside from Newar and Tibetic, egophoricity is attested in Tibeto-Burman languages like Galo (Tani), Japhug (Rgyalrongic), Bunan, Kurtöp (East Bodish), and Yongning Na (Naic) as well. Akha (Loloish) has developed egophoric marking independently of the other branches of the family.

Outside of Tibeto-Burman, some languages spoken in Northwestern China such as Salar (Turkic), Mongour (Mongolic) and Wutun developed egophoricity due to contact with Amdo Tibetan.

=== Other areas ===
Northern Akhvakh (Northeast Caucasian) marks egophoricity to some extent. In South America, Barbacoan languages such as Awa Pit and Cha’palaa exhibit an egophoric system similar to that of Tibeto-Burman.

Tournadre and LaPolla (2014) compare the Japanese desiderative suffix -tai to an egophoric marker in languages like Tibetan, as they follow the egophoric distribution. In Japanese, -tai as well as adjectives describing one's inner experience (such as "glad", "itchy") cannot be used for the third-person without the support of the suffix -garu or some evidential markers.

*Kare wa ureshii.
he TOP glad
"He is glad."

Kare wa ureshi-garu.
he TOP glad
"He is glad."

Kare wa ureshi-souda.
he TOP glad
"He looks glad."

== See also ==
- Linguistic typology
  - Evidentiality
  - Mirativity
  - Logophoricity
- Sino-Tibetan languages

== Bibliography ==
- DeLancey, Scott (1990). "Ergativity and the cognitive model of event structure in Lhasa Tibetan". Cognitive Linguistics. 1 (3): 289–322. doi:10.1515/cogl.1990.1.3.289. ISSN 0936-5907. S2CID 143931344.
- DeLancey, Scott (2018). "Evidentiality in Tibetic". In Alexandra Y. Aikhenvald (ed.). The Oxford Handbook of Evidentiality. Oxford University Press. pp. 580–594. doi:10.1093/oxfordhb/9780198759515.013.27. ISBN 978-0-19-875951-5.
- Egerod, Søren (1985). "Typological features in Akha". Linguistics of the Sino-Tibetan area: The state of the art. Papers presented to Paul K. Benedict for his 71st birthday., C-87 (PDF). Canberra: Pacific Linguistics. pp. 96–104. doi:10.15144/PL-C87.96.
- Hagège, Claude (1982). La structure des langues, Que sais-je?. Paris: Presses Universitaires de France. pp. 95–106.
- Hale, Austin (1980). "Person markers: Finite conjunct and disjunct verb forms in Newari". Papers in South-East Asian linguistics, Vol. 7. Canberra: Australian National University. pp. 95–106.
- Hargreaves, David (2005). "Agency and Intentional Action in Kathmandu Newar". Himalayan Linguistics. 5: 1–48. doi:10.5070/h95022977. ISSN 1544-7502.
- Hill, Nathan W.; Gawne, Lauren (2017). "The contribution of Tibetan languages to the study of evidentiality" (PDF). In Lauren Gawne and Nathan W. Hill (ed.). Evidential Systems of Tibetan Languages. De Gruyter. pp. 1–38. doi:10.1515/9783110473742-001. ISBN 978-3-11-047374-2.
- Jacques, Guillaume (2019). "Egophoric marking and person indexation in Japhug". Language and Linguistics: 515–534. doi:10.1075/lali.00047.jac. ISSN 1606-822X.
- Rumsey, Alan (2020). "Egophoricity, engagement, and the centring of subjectivity". In Henrik Bergqvist and Seppo Kittilä (ed.). Evidentiality, egophoricity, and engagement. Language Science Press. pp. 61–93. hdl:1885/217457.
- San Roque, Lila; Floyd, Simeon; Norcliffe, Elisabeth (2018). "Egophoricity: An introduction". In Simeon Floyd; Elisabeth Norcliffe; Lila San Roque (eds.). Egophoricity. Amsterdam: John Benjamins Publishing Company. pp. 1–78. doi:10.1075/tsl.118.01san. ISBN 978-90-272-0699-2. ISSN 0167-7373.
- Sandman, Erika (2018). "Egophoricity in Wutun". Egophoricity. Amsterdam: John Benjamins Publishing Company. pp. 173–196. doi:10.1075/tsl.118.06san. ISSN 0167-7373.
- Shimotori, Misuzu (2008). "Emotion, perceptions and desires of a third person: An ethnogrammatical study of the –garu structure in Japanese". Bulletin of the Transilvania University of Brasov, Series IV. 1 (50): 139–144.
- Tournadre, Nicolas (1991). "The rhetorical use of the Tibetan ergative". Linguistics of the Tibeto-Burman Area. 14 (1): 93–108. doi:10.32655/LTBA.14.1.04.
- Tournadre, Nicolas (2017). "A typological sketch of evidential/epistemic categories in the Tibetic languages". In Lauren Gawne and Nathan W. Hill (ed.). Evidential Systems of Tibetan Languages. De Gruyter. pp. 95–130. doi:10.1515/9783110473742-004. ISBN 978-3-11-047374-2.
- Tournadre, Nicolas; LaPolla, Randy J. (2014). "Towards a new approach to evidentiality". Linguistics of the Tibeto-Burman Area. 37 (2): 240–263. doi:10.1075/ltba.37.2.04tou. hdl:10356/145731. ISSN 0731-3500.
- Widmer, Manuel; Zúñiga, Fernando (2017). "Egophoricity, Involvement, and Semantic Roles in Tibeto-Burman Languages". Open Linguistics. 3 (1): 419–441. doi:10.1515/opli-2017-0021. ISSN 2300-9969. S2CID 149183324.
- Widmer, Manuel (2020). "Same same but different: On the relationship between ego- phoricity and evidentiality". In Henrik Bergqvist & Seppo Kittilä (ed.). Evidentiality, egophoricity, and engagement. Berlin: Language Science Press. pp. 263–287. doi:10.5281/zenodo.3975811.
