= Evidentiality =

Linguistic notion of claims' support

In linguistics, evidentiality is, broadly, the indication of the nature of evidence for a given statement; that is, whether evidence exists for the statement and if so, what kind. An evidential (also verificational or validational) is the particular grammatical element (affix, clitic, or particle) that indicates evidentiality. Languages with only a single evidential have had terms such as mediative, médiatif, médiaphorique, and indirective used instead of evidential.

Evidentiality may be direct or indirect: direct evidentials are used to describe information directly perceived by the speaker through vision as well as other sensory experiences while indirect evidentials consist of the other grammatical markers for evidence such as quotatives and inferentials.

== Introduction ==
All languages have some means of specifying the source of information. European languages (such as Germanic and Romance languages) often use modal verbs (Spanish: deber de, Dutch: zouden, Danish: skulle, German: sollen) or other lexical words (adverbials, English: reportedly) or phrases (English: it seems to me).

Some languages have a distinct grammatical category of evidentiality that is required to be expressed at all times. In contrast, the elements in European languages indicating the information source are optional and usually do not indicate evidentiality as their primary function; thus, they do not form a grammatical category. The obligatory elements of grammatical evidentiality systems may be translated into English, variously, as I hear that, I see that, I think that, as I hear, as I can see, as far as I understand, they say, it is said, it seems, it seems to me that, it looks like, it appears that, it turns out that, alleged, stated, allegedly, reportedly, obviously, etc.

Alexandra Aikhenvald (2004) reports that about a quarter of the world's languages have some type of grammatical evidentiality. Laura Mazzoni has since conducted a preliminary study on evidentiality in Italian Sign Language (LIS).

Grammatical evidentiality may be expressed in different forms depending on the language, such as through affixes, clitics, or particles. For example, Japanese has inferential evidentials and reportive markers that are realized as suffixes on a variety of mainly verbal predicates, and as grammaticalized nouns. As another example, Eastern Pomo uses four evidential suffixes that are added to verbs: -ink’e (nonvisual sensory), -ine (inferential), -·le (hearsay), and -ya (direct knowledge).

Evidentials in Eastern Pomo
Evidential type	Example verb	Gloss
nonvisual sensory	pʰa·békʰ-ink’e	"burned" [speaker felt the sensation]
inferential	pʰa·bék-ine	"must have burned" [speaker saw circumstantial evidence]
hearsay (reportative)	pʰa·békʰ-·le	"burned, they say" [speaker is reporting what was told]
direct knowledge	pʰa·bék-a	"burned" [speaker has direct evidence, probably visual]

Ainu marks evidentiality with a construction in which the clause is nominalized by one of four bound nouns and closed by the copula ne: inferential ruwe ne (from ru "trace"), reportative hawe ne (from haw "voice"), visual siri ne (from sir "sight, appearance") and non-visual sensory humi ne (from hum "sound, feeling"). The nouns still carry their possessive suffixes, and the construction, comparable to Japanese no da, is on its way from a nominalized clause to a verb plus auxiliary. The markers are optional and sentence-final. Dal Corso analyzes the Hokkaido and Sakhalin systems as organized by the reliability of the source, with these four direct forms contrasting with indirect forms such as siri an and humi as and with the reportatives hawe as (Hokkaido) and manu (Sakhalin).

Evidentials in Southern Hokkaido Ainu
Evidential type	Example	Gloss
inferential	tokey ku=sak ruwe ne	"(I infer that) I don't have a clock" [lit. "it is the trace of my lacking a clock"]
reportative	wen hawe ne	"it's bad" [assumed from what has been said; lit. "it is the voice of its being bad"]
visual	huci ek kor an siri ne	"(I see that) Grandmother is coming" [lit. "it is the sight of Grandmother coming"]
non-visual sensory	eytasa topen humi ne	"(I feel that) it is too sweet" [lit. "it is the sound of its being too sweet"]

Many languages with grammatical evidentiality mark evidentiality independently from tense-aspect or epistemic modality, which is the speaker's evaluation of the information, i.e. whether it is reliable, uncertain, probable.

The use of evidentiality has pragmatic implications. In languages that do not mark evidentiality distinctly from epistemic modality, for example, a person who makes a false statement qualified as a belief may be considered mistaken, while a person who makes a false statement qualified as a personally observed fact will probably be considered to have lied. More generally, a speaker of a language that does have obligatory grammatical evidentiality is required to cognitively engage with the source of their belief of any statement in a manner that the speaker of languages without obligatory evidentiality may gloss over.

In some languages, evidential markers also serve other purposes, such as indicating the speaker's attitude towards, or belief in, the statement. Usually a direct evidential marker may serve to indicate that the speaker is certain about the event stated. Using an indirect evidential marker, such as one for hearsay or reported information, may indicate that the speaker is uncertain about the statement, or doesn't want to take responsibility for its truth. A "hearsay" evidential may then have the undertone of "that's what they say; whether or not it's true is nothing I can take responsibility for". In other languages, this is not the case. Therefore, one should distinguish between such evidential markers that only mark source of knowledge, and such evidential markers that serve other functions, such as marking epistemic modality.

Evidentials can also be used to "deflect culpability" in a statement. In his dissertation on Nanti, a Peruvian Amazonian language, Lev Michael refers to an example in which a young girl is accidentally burned, and a community member questions her mother about how it happened. Her mother uses the evidential marker ka which translates to "presumably," to deflect responsibility for the girl's mistake.

Some languages are borderline cases. For example, the Romance languages are mostly like English in not having grammatical evidentiality, but do have a conditional mood which has three uses: conditions, future-in-the-past, and hearsay. Thus in journalistic French, there is frequently a distinction between Il a reconnu sa culpabilité and Il aurait reconnu sa culpabilité: both translate to "He has admitted his guilt," but with an implication of certainty with the first, and the idea of "reportedly" with the second. The same happens in Spanish (Él ha reconocido su culpa vs. Él habría reconocido su culpa) and in Portuguese (Ele reconheceu sua culpa vs. Ele teria reconhecido sua culpa).

Aikhenvald identified five semantic categories that recurrently occur across languages of the world:

- Visual Sensory
- Non-Visual Sensory
- Inferentials
- Hearsay Reportatives
- Quotative Reportatives

No language has been reported to have special forms for smell, taste or feeling although these may be covered by non-visual evidentials.

== Types according to Aikhenvald ==
Following the typology of Alexandra Aikhenvald, there are two broad types of evidential marking:

1. indirectivity marking ("type I")
2. evidential marking ("type II")

The first type (indirectivity) indicates whether evidence exists for a given statement, but does not specify what kind of evidence. The second type (evidentiality proper) specifies the kind of evidence (such as whether the evidence is visual, reported, or inferred).

=== Indirectivity (type I) ===
Indirectivity (also known as inferentiality) systems are common in Uralic and Turkic languages. These languages indicate whether evidence exists for a given source of information; thus, they contrast direct information (reported directly) and indirect information (reported indirectly, focusing on its reception by the speaker/recipient). Unlike the other evidential "type II" systems, an indirectivity marking does not indicate information about the source of knowledge: it is irrelevant whether the information results from hearsay, inference, or perception; however, some Turkic languages distinguish between reported indirect and non-reported indirect, see Johanson 2003, 2000 for further elaboration. This can be seen in the following Turkish verbs:

gel-di
come-PAST
"came"

gel-miş
come-INDIR.PAST
"obviously came, came (as far as understood)"

In the word geldi, the unmarked suffix -di indicates past tense. In the second word gelmiş, the suffix -miş also indicates past tense but indirectly. It may be translated into English with the added phrases 'obviously', 'apparently' or 'as far as I understand'. The direct past tense marker -di is unmarked (or neutral) in the sense that whether or not evidence exists supporting the statement is not specified.

=== Evidentiality (type II) ===
The other broad type of evidentiality systems ("type II") specifies the nature of the evidence supporting a statement. These kinds of evidence can be divided into such categories as:

- Sensory
  - Visual
  - Non-visual
- Inferential
- Assumed
- Reportative
  - Hearsay
  - Quotative

Sensory evidentials can often be divided into different types. Some languages mark visual evidence differently from nonvisual evidence that is heard, smelled, or felt. The Kashaya language has a separate auditory evidential.

An inferential evidential indicates information was not personally experienced but was inferred from indirect evidence. Some languages have different types of inferential evidentials. Some of the inferentials found indicate:

1. Information inferred by direct physical evidence
2. Information inferred by general knowledge
3. Information inferred/assumed because of speaker's experience with similar situations
4. Past deferred realization

In many cases, different inferential evidentials also indicate epistemic modality, such as uncertainty or probability (see epistemic modality below). For example, one evidential may indicate that the information is inferred but of uncertain validity, while another indicates that the information is inferred but unlikely to be true.

Reportative evidentials indicate that the information was reported to the speaker by another person. A few languages distinguish between hearsay evidentials and quotative evidentials. Hearsay indicates reported information that may or may not be accurate. A quotative indicates the information is accurate and not open to interpretation, i.e., is a direct quotation. An example of a reportative from Shipibo (-ronki):

a- ronki- ai
do- REPRT- INCOMPL
"It is said that she will do it." / "She says that she will do it."

==== Typology of evidentiality systems ====
The following is a brief survey of evidential systems found in the languages of the world as identified in Aikhenvald (2004). Some languages only have two evidential markers while others may have six or more. The system types are organized by the number of evidentials found in the language. For example, a two-term system (A) will have two different evidential markers; a three-term system (B) will have three different evidentials. The systems are further divided by the type of evidentiality that is indicated (e.g. A1, A2, A3, etc.). Languages that exemplify each type are listed in parentheses.

The most common system found is the A3 type.

Two-term systems:

- A1. witness, nonwitness (e.g. Jarawara, Yukaghir languages, Mỹky, Godoberi, Kalasha-mun, Khowar, Yanam)
- A2. nonfirsthand, everything else (e.g. Abkhaz, Mansi, Khanty, Nenets, Enets, Selkup, Northeast Caucasian languages)
- A3. reported, everything else (e.g. Turkic languages, Tamil, Enga, Tauya, Lezgian, Kham, Estonian, Livonian, Tibeto-Burman languages, several South American languages)

Three-term systems:

- B1. visual sensory, inferential, reportative (e.g. Aymara, Shastan languages, Qiang languages, Maidu, most Quechuan languages, Northern Embera languages)
- B2. visual sensory, nonvisual sensory, inferential (e.g. Washo)
- B3. nonvisual sensory, inferential, reportative (e.g. Retuarã, Northern Pomo)
- B4. witness (direct), nonwitness (indirect), inferential, reportative (e.g. Tsezic and Dagestanian languages)

Four-term systems:

- C1. visual sensory, nonvisual sensory, inferential, reportative (e.g. Tariana, Xamatauteri, Eastern Pomo, East Tucanoan languages)
- C2. visual sensory, inferential #1, inferential #2, reportative (e.g. Tsafiki, Pawnee, Ancash Quechua)
- C3. nonvisual sensory, inferential #1, inferential #2, reportative (e.g. Wintu)
- C4. visual sensory, inferential, reportative #1, reportative #2 (e.g. Southeastern Tepehuan)
- C5. witness (non-subjective, non-renarrative), inferential (subjective, non-renarrative), renarrative (non-subjective, renarrative), dubitative (subjective, renarrative) (e.g. Bulgarian)

Five-plus term systems:

- visual sensory, nonvisual sensory, inferential, reportative, assumed (e.g. Tuyuca, Tucano)
- witness, inferential, reportative, assumed, "internal support" (e.g. Nambikwaran languages)
- visual sensory, nonvisual sensory, inferential, reported, heard from known source, direct participation (e.g. Fasu)
- nonvisual sensory, inferential #1, inferential #2, inferential #3, reportative (e.g. Western Apache)
- inferential, anticipation, performative, deduction, induction, hearsay, direct observation, opinion, assumed, "to know by culture", "to know by internal" (Lojban)

== Evidentiality marking and other categories ==
Evidential systems in many languages are often marked simultaneously with other linguistic categories. For example, according to Aikhenvald, a given language may use the same element to mark both evidentiality and mirativity, i.e., unexpected information. She claims that this is the case of Western Apache where the post-verbal particle lą̄ą̄ primarily functions as a mirative but also has a secondary function as an inferential evidential. This phenomenon of evidentials developing secondary functions, or other grammatical elements such as miratives and modal verbs developing evidential functions is fairly widespread. The following types of mixed systems have been reported:

- evidentiality with mirativity
- evidentiality with tense-aspect
- evidentiality with modality (this is discussed in the next section below)

In addition to the interactions with tense, modality, and mirativity, the usage of evidentials in some languages may also depend on the clause type, discourse structure, and/or linguistic genre.

However, despite the intersection of evidentiality systems with other semantic or pragmatic systems (through grammatical categories), Aikhenvald believes that several languages do mark evidentiality without any grammatical connection to these other semantic/pragmatic systems. More explicitly stated, she believes that there are modal systems which do not express evidentiality, and evidential systems which do not express modality. Likewise, there are mirative systems which do not express evidentiality, and evidential systems which do not express mirativity.

Aside from those, egophoricity may interact with evidentiality as well.

=== Tense ===
Some languages may only distinguish between direct and indirect evidentials in the past tense. This is the case for Georgian (Kartvelian), Komi-Zyrian (Finno-Ugric), Haida (a language isolate in British Columbia and Alaska), and Ika (Chibchan).

=== Epistemic modality ===
Evidentiality is often considered to be a sub-type of epistemic modality (see, for example, Palmer 1986, Kiefer 1994). Other linguists consider evidentiality (marking the source of information in a statement) to be distinct from epistemic modality (marking the degree of confidence in a statement). An English example:

I see that he is coming. (evidential)
I know that he is coming. (epistemic)

For instance, de Haan states that evidentiality asserts evidence while epistemic modality evaluates evidence and that evidentiality is more akin to a deictic category marking the relationship between speakers and events/actions (like the way demonstratives mark the relationship between speakers and objects; see also Joseph 2003). Aikhenvald (2003) finds that evidentials may indicate a speaker's attitude about the validity of a statement but this is not a required feature of evidentials. Additionally, she finds that evidential-marking may co-occur with epistemic-marking, but it may also co-occur with aspectual/tense or mirative marking.

Considering evidentiality as a type of epistemic modality may only be the result of analyzing non-European languages in terms of the systems of modality found in European languages. For example, the modal verbs in Germanic languages are used to indicate both evidentiality and epistemic modality (and are thus ambiguous when taken out of context). Other (non-European) languages clearly mark these differently. De Haan (2001) finds that the use of modal verbs to indicate evidentiality is comparatively rare (based on a sample of 200 languages).

=== Clause type ===
Evidential categories are more likely to be marked in a main declarative clause than in the other types of clauses. In some languages, however, evidential forms may appear in questions or commands as well.

=== Terminology ===
Although some linguists have proposed that evidentiality should be considered separately from epistemic modality, other linguists conflate the two. Because of this conflation, some researchers use the term evidentiality to refer both to the marking of the knowledge source and the commitment to the truth of the knowledge.

== In English (not grammaticalized) ==
Evidentiality is not considered a grammatical category in English because it is expressed in diverse ways and is always optional. In contrast, many other languages (including Quechua, Aymara, and Yukaghir) require the speaker to mark the main verb or the sentence as a whole for evidentiality, or offer an optional set of affixes for indirect evidentiality, with direct experience being the default assumed mode of evidentiality.

Consider these English sentences:

I am hungry.
Bob is hungry.

We are unlikely to say the second unless someone (perhaps Bob himself) has told us that Bob is hungry (We might still say it for someone incapable of speaking for themself, such as a baby or a pet). If we are simply assuming that Bob is hungry based on the way he looks or acts, we are more likely to say something like:

Bob looks hungry.
Bob seems hungry.
Bob would be hungry by now.
Bob must be hungry by now.

Here, the fact that we are relying on sensory evidence, rather than direct experience, is conveyed by our use of the word look or seem.

Another situation in which the evidential modality is expressed in English is in certain kinds of predictions, namely those based on the evidence at hand. These can be referred to as "predictions with evidence". Examples:

Look at those clouds! It's going to rain! (Compare "It will rain!").

== Western history of the concept ==
The notion of evidentiality as obligatory grammatical information was first made apparent in 1911 by Franz Boas in his introduction to The Handbook of American Indian Languages in a discussion of Kwakiutl and in his grammatical sketch of Tsimshianic. The term evidential was first used in the current linguistic sense by Roman Jakobson in 1957 in reference to Balkan Slavic (Jacobsen 1986:4; Jakobson 1990) with the following definition:

"E^{n}E^{ns}/E^{s} evidential is a tentative label for the verbal category which takes into account three events — a narrated event (E^{n}), a speech event (E^{s}), and a narrated speech event (E^{ns}). The speaker reports an event on the basis of someone else's report (quotative, i.e. hearsay evidence), of a dream (revelative evidence), of a guess (presumptive evidence) or of his own previous experience (memory evidence)."

Jakobson also was the first to clearly separate evidentiality from grammatical mood. By the middle of the 1960s, evidential and evidentiality were established terms in linguistic literature.

Systems of evidentiality have received focused linguistic attention only relatively recently. The first major work to examine evidentiality cross-linguistically is Chafe & Nichols (1986). A more recent typological comparison is Aikhenvald (2004).

== See also ==
- Epistemology – Philosophical study of knowledge
- Linguistic modality – Phenomenon whereby language is used to discuss possible situations
  - Epistemic modality – Type of linguistic modality
- Mirativity – Grammatical category which conveys surprise
- Egophoricity – Linguistic encoding of personal knowledge
- Grammatical mood – Grammatical feature of verbs
- Evidence theory – Mathematical framework to model epistemic uncertainty
