= Mirativity =

Grammatical category which conveys surprise

In linguistics, mirativity, initially proposed by Scott DeLancey, is a grammatical category in a language, independent of evidentiality, that encodes the speaker's surprise or the unpreparedness of their mind. Grammatical elements that encode the semantic category of mirativity are called miratives (abbreviated mir).

== History of the concept ==
Albanian has a series of verb forms called miratives or admiratives. These may express surprise on the part of the speaker, but may also have other functions, such as expressing irony, doubt, or reportedness. The Albanian use of admirative forms is unique in the Balkan context. It is not translatable into other languages. The expression of neutral reportedness can be rendered by 'apparently'.

While acknowledging the Balkanist term admiratives, DeLancey (1997) promoted miratives as a cross-linguistic term, which he adapted from Jacobsen's (1964) description of the Washo language. According to DeLancey (1997), Turkish, Hare, Sunwar, Lhasa Tibetan, and Korean exhibit a grammatical category to mark information that is new to the speaker.

In Turkish, the verbal suffix -miş appears in the same slot as the past tense -di.

Kemal gel-di
'Kemal came.'

Kemal gel-miş
'Kemal came!?'

While it is reasonable to assume that -miş marks indirect evidentiality as long as 'inference' and 'hearsay' interpretations are concerned, this does not explain the 'surprise' use of the suffix in the following sentence:

Kız-ınız çok iyi piyano çal-ıyor-muş.
daughter-your very good piano play-PRES-MIR
'Your daughter plays the piano very well!'

Citing DeLancey as a predecessor, many researchers have reported miratives in the Tibeto-Burman family and other languages.

=== Criticisms ===
Mirativity is not necessarily expressed through a category on its own; Aikhenvald (2004) points out that a mirative meaning may also be coded by using other grammatical devices such as an evidential or tense marker. This led some researchers to question the status of mirativity as a grammatical category. Lazard (1999) suggested that evidentials and miratives would be subsumed under the term mediative. Hill argued that the evidence given by DeLancey and by Aikhenvald (2004) was either wrong or insufficient.

In Lhasa Tibetan, the direct evidential verb 'dug may express mirativity in contrast to the other existential verbs, especially when it is used in a statement on the speaker themselves:

nga-r deb de yod.
1-LOC book that exist
'I have that book'

nga-r deb de 'dug.
1-LOC book that exist
'I have that book [which I should have returned].'

However, the mirative account does not hold for the following sentence, where 'dug is used as an auxiliary verb and has nothing to do with surprise, sudden discovery nor unexpectedness:

nga na-gi-'dug.
1 sick-PRES-AUX
'I'm sick at the moment.'

While DeLancey (2012) made no mention of Turkish, Sunwar or Korean, he still promoted Hare, Kham, and Magar as clear cases of miratives. Hill (2015) in response provided an alternative analysis of Hare, re-analyzing DeLancey's evidence for 'mirativity' as direct evidentiality.

=== Responses to criticisms ===
Hengeveld and Olbertz (2012) argue against Hill (2012) for miratives as a distinct category, citing data from Tarma Quechua, Ecuadorian Highland Spanish, Xamamauteri (a Yanomaman language), Kham, and Cupeño. DeLancey (2012) also argued strenuously against Hill's (2012) claims. Zeisler (2018), focusing on the Tibetic languages, considers both Hill and DeLancey to be partly wrong and partly right, and argues that the relevant categories in Tibetic languages represent grammatical marking of "speaker attitude" rather than of evidentiality.

== Semantics ==
Unlike evidentials, miratives may mark novelty of information to anyone involved in the conversation rather than the speaker's source of information, although what is labelled as 'miratives' varies in meaning. Aikhenvald (2012) analyses variations of mirative meanings as follows:

1. Sudden discovery, sudden revelation or realization by the speaker, by the audience (or addressee), or by the main character;
2. Surprise of the speaker, of the audience (or addressee), or of the main character;
3. Unprepared mind of the speaker, of the audience (or addressee), or of the main character;
4. Counter-expectation to the speaker, to the addressee, or to the main character;
5. Information new to the speaker, to the addressee, or to the main character.

Apparently, a mirative marker does not always cover all of those values. For example, !Xun, a Northern Khoisan language has a mirative particle kohà, which can follow an evidential marker but is in complementary distribution with the counter-expectation marker kò. This suggests that mirativity forms a different grammatical category from evidentiality while surprise and counter-expectation are expressed by different particles in the language.

== Coding of mirativity ==
Many languages can express surprise or new information using an interjection like 'Wow!'. In English, the expression of surprise can be rendered by 'oh, look!' or 'lookee there!'. Intonation can also contribute to expression of mirative meanings.

Some languages have a sentence-final particle (SFP) for mirativity. In Cantonese, the SFP wo^{3} expresses noteworthiness while wo^{4} is associated with unexpectedness, both of which fit the definition of miratives in contrast with the hearsay evidential wo^{5}.

Mirativity can be expressed through verbal morphology, as is the case with the "sudden discovery tense" marker -naq in Tarma Quechua:

chawra-qa cha:-qa ka-ku-naq alqu
then-TOP that-TOP be-CUST-3.A/S.MIR dog
'So it turned out that he was a dog [not a human being as he had appeared to be].'

Mirativity in Kuɽux can be marked by a suffix -eː, itself is not considered an independent case. This element is restricted to consonant-final nominal bases. Eg. nerr-eː "Snake!" but not *lakɽa "Tiger!"
