= Velázquez Press =

Velázquez Press is the publisher of Velázquez Spanish and English Dictionary.

== History ==
Velázquez Spanish and English Dictionary was first published in 1852 by D. Appleton and Company in New York. The title was Seoanne's Neuman & Barett's Spanish Pronouncing Dictionary. Mariano Velazquez de la Cadena, a renowned linguist and professor at Columbia University, composed the dictionary based on The Spanish Dictionary of Spanish Academy, Terreros, and Salva and English Dictionary of Webster, Worcester and Walker.

Velázquez Spanish and English Dictionary is the oldest Spanish and English Dictionary still being published in the United States. Throughout the years, Velázquez Spanish and English Dictionary has been licensed to various publishers, from Follett Corporation to Simon & Schuster. It is widely used in the United States and many Latin American countries.

In 2003 Academic Learning Company, LLC acquired Velázquez Spanish and English Dictionary and launched Velázquez Press. Since then, Velázquez Press has published many Spanish and English dictionaries, from the only hardcover Velázquez Large Print Spanish and large print English Dictionary.

In 2008, Velázquez Press released its dictionary content online for free use. It also licensed its content to many websites such as SpanishDict.com.

== Products ==
In 2008, Velázquez Press began creating products to help Spanish-speaking English Language Learners. Recognizing that many Spanish-speaking immigrants lack the vocabulary or language skills to understand classroom content, the company launched a line of subject-specific glossaries for students to use in the classroom, at home, and on state standardized testing. Velázquez Press has created subject-specific glossaries for math, science, social studies, and language arts.

== Seal of Biliteracy ==
In 2010, Velázquez Press launched its Seal of Biliteracy Recognition Program. The program is designed to encourage biliteracy in Spanish and English and reward students who achieve proficiency in both languages. Employers may also use the Seal of Biliteracy as a standard for bilingual abilities in potential employees. The program is part of the company's greater campaign to address alarming dropout rates among Latino high school students, with nearly 3 in every 10 Latino students dropping out according to a CNN report.

Schools and districts that have implemented the program include Azusa High School, Sierra Madre High School, Baldwin Park High School, and Los Angeles Unified School District.
