= Mahāvyutpatti =

Buddhist bilingual dictionary

The Mahāvyutpatti (Devanagari: महाव्युत्पत्ति, compound of महत् (in compounds often महा) - great, big, and व्युत्पत्ति f. - science, formation of words, etymology; Wylie: Bye-brag-tu rtogs-par byed-pa chen-po), The Great Volume of Precise Understanding or Essential Etymology, was compiled in Tibet during the late eighth to early ninth centuries CE, providing a dictionary composed of thousands of Sanskrit and Tibetan terms designed as means to provide standardised Buddhist texts in Tibetan, and is included as part of the Tibetan Tengyur (Toh. 4346). It is the earliest substantial bilingual dictionary known.

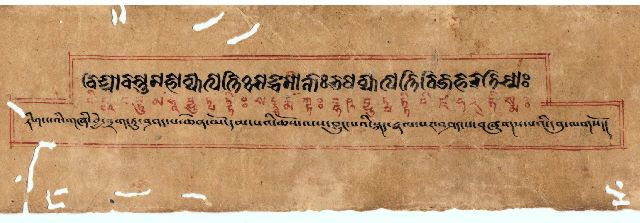

The Mahāvyutpatti is traditionally attributed to the reign of Ralpacan (c. 838), "but as Professor Tucci has pointed out (Tombs of the Tibetan Kings, pp. 14–15), it undoubtedly goes back to his predecessor Sad-na-legs, and one might well assume, in its actual conception, even back to the time of Khri Srong-lde-brtsan, when these problems were first seriously confronted...." So, whatever the case, it must be dated prior to 838 CE, and probably to the time of Sadnalegs (reigned c. 800–815 CE).

Several Indian pandits were consulted before the translation began. A committee of three Tibetan translators who had definitely been translating during the reign of Sadnalegs, 'Bro Ka.ba dPal.brtsegs, Cog.ro kLu'i rgyal.mtshan, and sNa.nam Ye.she.sde, was set up to do the actual translation.

"Using this new lexical standard, the mistakes and misinterpretations of the older translations were corrected, and omissions were restored. Overtranslated works were reduced, and previously untranslated works were put into Tibetan. The final amendments to the Mahavyutpatti were carried out by the four great Indian panditas, Jinamitra, Surendrabodhi, Bhiryakarapha and Dhanashila, who were asked to correct the work of the Tibetan translators. When the translations were completed, they were proclaimed definitive and no further revisions permitted."

The original dictionary contained 9,565 lexical entries divided into 277 chapters, and was in three volumes – one on the Hinayana, one on the Mahayana, and one of indexes. Three editions were made and installed at pho.brang lDan.mkhar, 'Phang-thang, and mChims.phu.

Another book, the sGra-sbyor bam-po gnyis-pa, or 'Word-Combination', a two-part work, definitely produced during the reign of Sadnalegs, clearly describes in its opening words how the dictionary was produced:

"The Western scholars, the teachers Jinamitra, Surendrabodhi, Śīlendrabodhi, Dānaśīla and Bodhimitra together with the Tibetan scholars, Ratnarakṣita and Dharmatāśīla and others, having made translations from the Sanskrit of both Mahāyāna and Hīnayāna into Tibetan, made an index of the words they had used. The order was given that one should never translate apart from that criterion and that everyone should become familiar with it. Out of the many terms used previously in the time of my Father, Offspring of the Gods, by the teacher Bodhisattva (Śāntarakṣita), Jñānendra, Zḥang-blon Nyen-nya-bzang, Blon Khri-bzher Sang-shi, together with the translators Jñānadevakoṣa, lTse Khyi-'brug and the Brahman Ānanda and others, in the translation of a religious language which had not been promulgated in Tibet, there are some that failed to accord with religious criteria or with grammatical usage. Thus those that were unacceptable in their unrevised state, were revised. The linguistic terms which required elucidation were accumulated and then depending on their usage in basic Mahāyāna and Hīnayāna texts, also upon their usage by the great masters of former times such as Nāgārjuna and Vasubandhu and the meaning that was to be extracted in accordance with grammatical usage, those that were difficult to understand were separated into their parts and then prescribed as a rule with the clear meaning given. Simple terms that did not require elucidation and that might be suitable translated according to their ordinary meaning (literally; just as they sounded) were prescribed as terms with these fixed meanings. As for some words, which had to be fixed in accordance with an interpretation, they were prescribed as terms with these firm interpretations."

The sGra-sbyor bam-po gnyis-pa then goes on to give the royal orders on how the texts were to be translated from Sanskrit to Tibetan, and also explains that, because the tantras "are to be secret by regulation" ... "henceforth with regard to dhāraṇīs, mantras and tantras, unless permission for translation is given, tantras and mantra expressions are not permitted to be collected and translated."

Later on Chinese was added to the Sanskrit and Tibetan. By the 17th century versions were being produced with Chinese, Mongolian and Manchurian equivalents.

The first English translation was made by the pioneering Hungarian Tibetologist Sándor Kőrösi Csoma, also known as Alexander Csoma de Kőrös (1784–1842). The Asiatic Society of Bengal in Calcutta published the first part in 1834, a second part in 1910 and the third and final part in 1944.

This early dictionary is still in use today, though usually in reverse order - to discover the Sanskrit equivalents for Tibetan Buddhist terms and to recreate Sanskrit texts of which the originals have been lost from their Tibetan translations.
