= List of manchurologists =

The List of manchurologists links to the biographies of manchurologists, that is, scholars of Manchu studies, the field of scholarship that examines the Manchu language, the sources written in it (or other languages) on the history, culture, ideology, and religion of the peoples of the Qing Empire (1644–1912), as well as the modern Manchu and Sibe peoples. Listed are person who made significant or influential contributions to the field. The scope is broad. See also the lists of sinologists, khitanologists, tangutologists.

== List ==
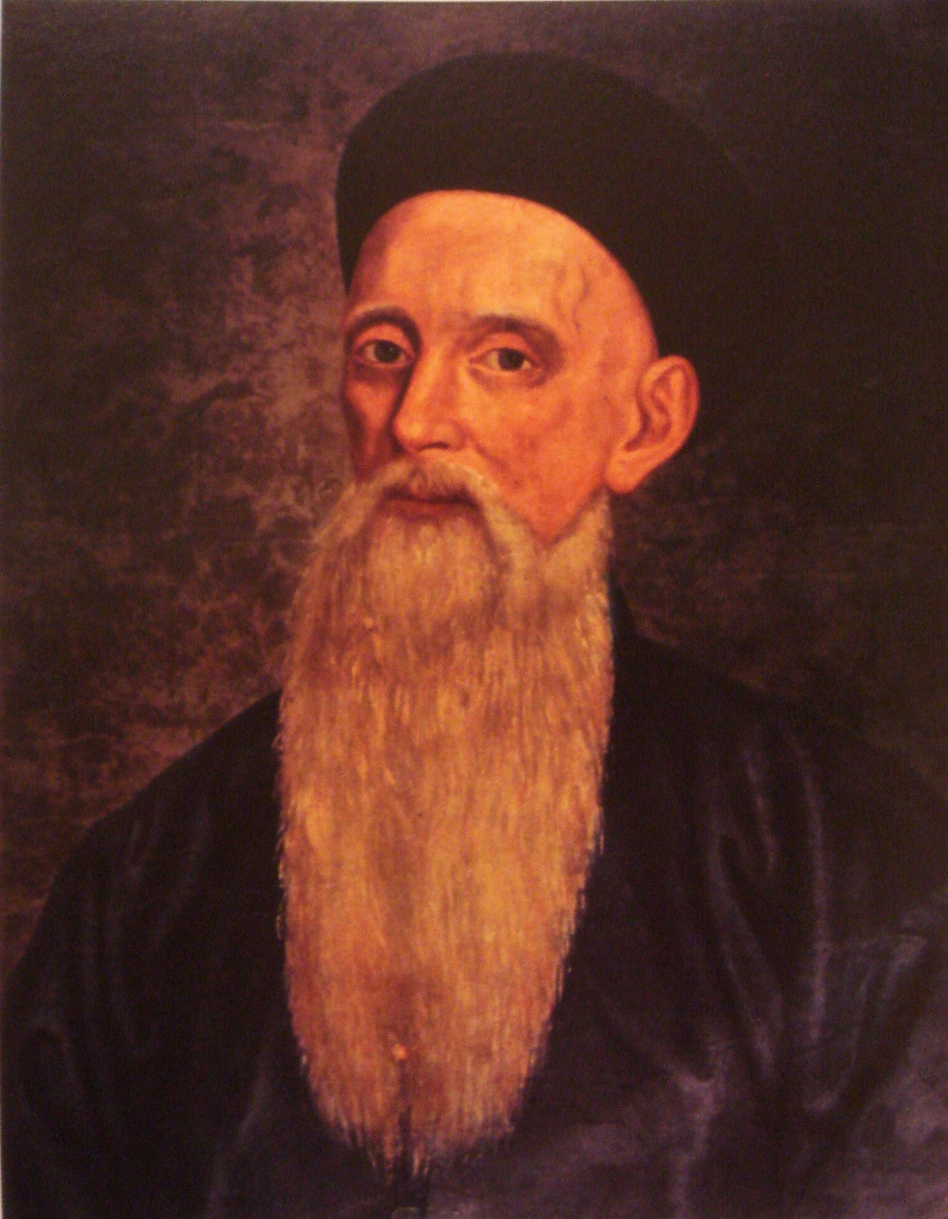
Joseph-Marie Amiot (1718–1793), SJ

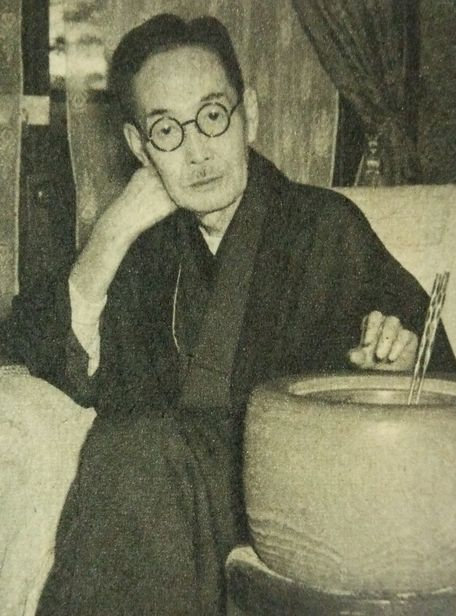
Haneda Tōru (1882–1955)

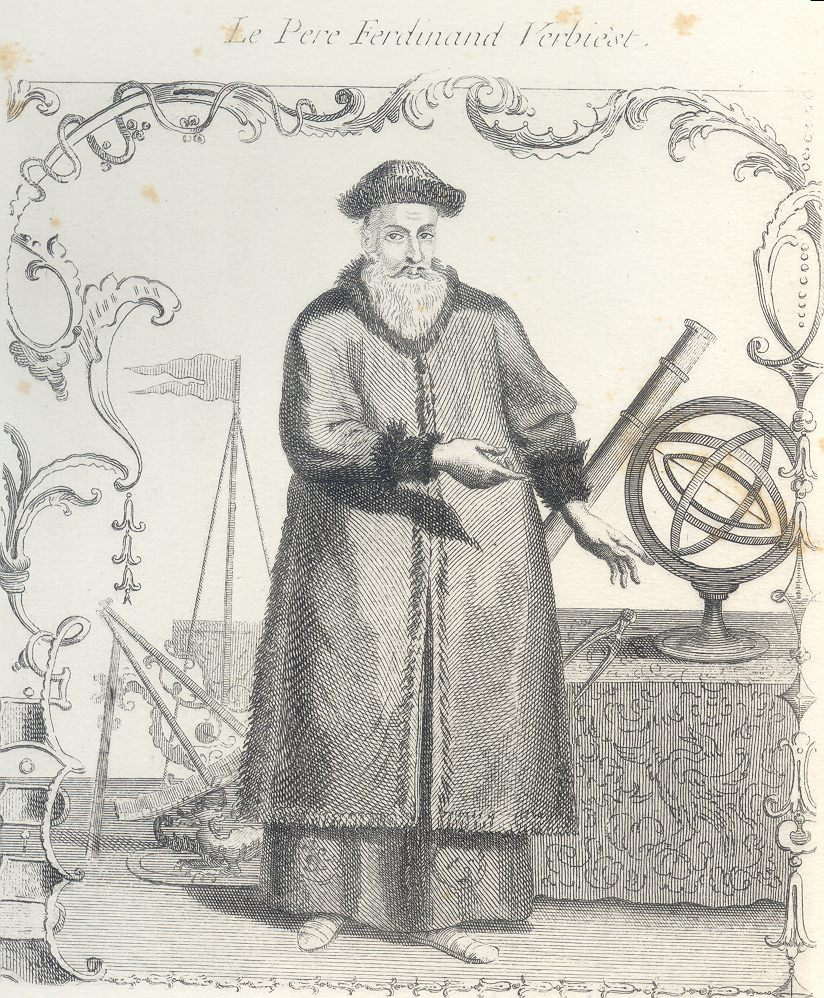
Ferdinand Verbiest (1623–1688), SJ

- Jean Joseph Marie Amiot (1718–1793) (Dictionnaire tartare-mantchou-françois, composé d'après un dictionnaire mantchou-chinois)
- An Shuangcheng 安双成 (born 1942) (Man-Han da cidian 满汉大辞典, ed.)
- Chuang Chi-fa (Zhuang Jifa 莊吉發) (born 1936)
- Nicola Di Cosmo (born 1957) (Manchu-Mongol relations on the eve of the Qing conquest)
- Walter Fuchs (de) (1902–1979) (Der Jesuiten-Atlas der Kanghsi-Zeit / 康熙皇輿全覽圖)
- Georg von der Gabelentz (1840–1893)
- Hans Conon von der Gabelentz (1807–1874)
- Getuken 格吐肯 (born 1944) (Man-Han cidian 满汉辞典 [Manchu-Chinese dictionary])
- Martin Gimm (de) (born 1930)
- Wilhelm Grube (1855–1908)
- Haneda Tōru 羽田亨 (1882–1955) (Man-Wa jiten 滿和辭典 Manju z̆i-ben gisun kamcibuha bithe [Manchu-Japanese dictionary])
- Erich Haenisch (1880–1966)
- Erich Hauer (de) (1878–1936) (Handwörterbuch der Mandschusprache)
- Hu Zengyi 胡增益 (born 1936) (Xin Man-Han da cidian 新满汉大词典 = Iche Manzhu Nikan gisun kamchibuha buleku bithe, Xinjiang 1994, ed.)
- Jin Guangping 金光平 or Hengxu (1899–1966)
- Jin Qicong 金启孮 (1918–2004)
- Yoshihiro Kawachi 河内良弘 (born 1928)
- Heinrich Julius Klaproth (1783–1835)
- Berthold Laufer (1874–1934) (Skizze der manjurischen Literatur)
- Liu Xiaomeng 劉小萌 (born 1952)
- Joseph-Anne-Marie de Moyriac de Mailla (1669–1748)
- Paul Georg von Möllendorff (1847–1901)
- Jerry Norman (1936–2012)
- Tatjana A. Pang (born 1955)
- Boris Pankratov (1892–1979)
- Evelyn Rawski (born 1939)
- Seong Baek-in (1933–2018)
- Shin Gye-am (fl. 1620s–1630s)
- Giovanni Stary (1946–2022)
- Ulhicun 烏拉熙春 (born 1958)
- Ferdinand Verbiest (1623–1688)
- Hartmut Walravens (born 1944)
- Józef Wojciechowski (1793–1850)
- Yan Chongnian 阎崇年 (born 1934)
- Wang Zhonghan 王钟翰 (1913–2007)
- Ivan Ilyich Zakharov (1816–1885)
- Zhou Yuanlian 周远廉 (1930–2020)

== See also ==
- Category:Tungusic and Manchu Studies Scholars (Russian)
- Oriental Institute (Vladivostok) (Russian)
- Manchu studies during the Qing Dynasty

== Bibliography ==
- Пан, Т. А. (2017). "Маньчжуроведение". Большая российская энциклопедия. Электронная версия (in Russian). Archived from the original on 28 February 2018.
