= Kim Yujin (writer) =

South Korean writer (born 1981)

Kim Yujin (Korean: 김유진; born 1981) is a South Korean writer.

== Life ==
Kim Yujin was born in Seoul in 1981. She graduated in creative writing from Myongji University. She began her literary career when her short story The Mark of the Wolf (늑대의 문장) won the Munhakdongne New Writer Award. She was awarded the 2nd Munhakdongne Young Writer’s Award in 2011, and the 2nd Sonagi Village – Hwang Soonone Literature Prize in 2013. She has published a short story collection The Mark of the Wolf (늑대의 문장), and a novel Sumeun bam (숨은 밤 The Hidden Night).

== Themes ==
Kim Yujin’s early works contain themes of apocalyptic imagination. Kim Yujin’s apocalypse leads to exploration on the feminine world. For instance, in “Eojae” (어제 Yesterday), she portrayed the story of women who attempts to escape the life in an anchored laundry boat and go into an unknown future. In “The Mark of the Wolf” (늑대의 문장) and “The Witch” (마녀), she tells a story of girls who leave civilization in favor of primitive times, and a story of beings that travels beyond the world of death.

== Works ==
- Badasseugi (받아쓰기 Dictation)
- Yeoreum (여름 Summer)
- Sumeun bam (숨은 밤 The Hidden Night)
- The Mark of the Wolf (늑대의 문장)

== Awards ==
- Sonagi Village – Hwang Soonone Literature Prize, 2013.
- Munhakdongne Young Writer’s Award, 2011.
