= Grebenshchikov =

Grebenshchikov (Гребенщико́в) is a Russian surname. Notable people with this surname include:

- Alexander Grebenshchikov (1880–1941), Soviet scholar of Tungusic languages
- Boris Grebenshchikov (born 1953), Russian rock musician
- George Grebenstchikoff (1883–1964), Russian writer
- Kirill Grebenshchikov (born 1972), Russian actor
- Vladimir Grebenshchikov (born 1992), Kazakhstani ice hockey player
