= Kim Seong-joong =

South Korean writer (born 1975)

Kim Seong Joong (Hangul 김성중; born 1975) is a South Korean writer. She studied creative writing at Myongji University and began her literary career in 2008 when “Nae euijareul dolyeojusaeyo” (내 의자를 돌려주세요 Please Return My Chair) won the JoongAng New Writer's Award. Her short story collections include Gaegeuman (개그맨 Comedian) and Gukgyeongsijang (국경시장 Border Market).

== Life ==
Kim made her literary debut at the age of 33. After graduating university, she drifted between jobs including reporting for several magazines that are now out of print, ghostwriting autobiographies, and game writing, until her short story “Nae euijareul dolyeojusaeyo” (내 의자를 돌려주세요 Please Return My Chair) won the JoongAng New Writer's Award in 2008. Despite her relatively late debut, Kim's work quickly drew the attention of literary circles. In 2010, she received the inaugural Moonji Literary Award, and went on to win the Munhakdongne Young Writers' Award for a record-breaking three consecutive years from 2010 to 2012. Her first short story collection Gaegeuman (개그맨 Comedian), published in 2011, earned critical acclaim. Literary critic Wu Chan Je compared it to “a kaleidoscope in midair” and Seo Hui Won noted that “the writer’s imagination switches gears as fast as a chameleon darts across a blooming flower field.” Her second short story collection Gukgyeongsijang (국경시장 Border Market) was published in 2015.

== Writing ==
Kim works with various subjects and multiple genres. This is why, rather than applying any one label to her such as a “realist” or “modernist,” she is better understood as a writer who experiments with different styles that suit the imaginative background of each story. The work that put Kim on the literary map is Gaegeuman (개그맨 Comedian), her first collection of short stories including: “Heogong-eui aideul” (허공의 아이들 Children in the Air), which depicts a boy and a girl growing up in an apocalyptic world reminiscent of Hayao Miyazaki’s Castle in the Sky; and “Gebal seoninjang” (게발 선인 장 Christmas Cactus), a story dealing with a religious cult that has one leader, one follower, and one apostate. Kim’s imaginative style is also apparent in her second short story collection Gukgyeongsijang (국경시장 Border Market), which includes the titular “Border Market” (featuring a marketplace where customers have to sell their memories to buy something) and “Kumun” (a story of a woman who chooses a short and painful life to obtain the gift of genius).

== Works ==
1. 『개그맨』, 문학과지성사, 2011.

Comedian. Moonji, 2011.

2. 『국경시장』, 문학동네, 2015.

Border Market. Munhakdongne, 2015.

=== Works in translation ===
1. Asia Literary Review : Spring 2017 (English)
2. AZALEA (Journal of Korean Literature & Culture) : Volume Nine (English)
3. Asia Literary Review : Spring 2016 (English)

== Awards ==
2008: 9th JoongAng New Writer's Award

2010: 1st Munhakdongne Young Writers’ Award

2010: 1st Moonji Literary Award

2011: 2nd Munhakdongne Young Writers’ Award

2012: 3rd Munhakdongne Young Writers’ Award
