= Jurchen Radicals =

- Range: U+191A0..U+191DF (64 code points)
- Plane: SMP
- Scripts: Jurchen
- Assigned: 51 code points
- Unused: 13 reserved code points

Unicode Version History
- 18.0 (2026): 51 (+51)

Unicode documentation
- Code chart ∣ Web page

Jurchen Radicals is a Unicode block containing radicals used to aid in Jurchen script character lookup. They are based on Jin Qicong's Jurchen script Dictionary (女真文辞典).

== Block ==
Jurchen Radicals^{[1]}^{[2]} Official Unicode Consortium code chart (PDF)
| | 0 | 1 | 2 | 3 | 4 | 5 | 6 | 7 | 8 | 9 | A | B | C | D | E | F |
| U+191Ax | 𙆠 | 𙆡 | 𙆢 | 𙆣 | 𙆤 | 𙆥 | 𙆦 | 𙆧 | 𙆨 | 𙆩 | 𙆪 | 𙆫 | 𙆬 | 𙆭 | 𙆮 | 𙆯 |
| U+191Bx | 𙆰 | 𙆱 | 𙆲 | 𙆳 | 𙆴 | 𙆵 | 𙆶 | 𙆷 | 𙆸 | 𙆹 | 𙆺 | 𙆻 | 𙆼 | 𙆽 | 𙆾 | 𙆿 |
| U+191Cx | 𙇀 | 𙇁 | 𙇂 | 𙇃 | 𙇄 | 𙇅 | 𙇆 | 𙇇 | 𙇈 | 𙇉 | 𙇊 | 𙇋 | 𙇌 | 𙇍 | 𙇎 | 𙇏 |
| U+191Dx | 𙇐 | 𙇑 | 𙇒 | | | | | | | | | | | | | |
Notes 1.As of Unicode version 18.0 2.Grey areas indicate non-assigned code points

== History ==
The following Unicode-related documents record the purpose and process of defining specific characters in the Jurchen Radicals block:

| Version | Final code points (Note: Proposed code points and characters names may differ from final code points and names) | Count | L2 ID | WG2 ID | Document |
|---|---|---|---|---|---|
| 18.0 | U+191A0..191D2 | 51 | L2/24-140 | N5278 | West, Andrew; Sun, Bojun; Everson, Michael (2024-06-12), Proposal to Encode Radicals for the Jurchen Script |
| 18.0 | U+191A0..191D2 | 51 | L2/24-166 | | Anderson, Deborah; Goregaokar, Manish; Kučera, Jan; Whistler, Ken; Pournader, Roozbeh; Constable, Peter (2024-07-18), "6. Jurchen", Recommendations to UTC #180 July 2024 on Script Proposals |
| 18.0 | U+191A0..191D2 | 51 | L2/24-159 | | Constable, Peter (2024-07-29), "Consensus 180-C29", UTC #180 Minutes, "Provisionally assign [...] with the names of U+191A0..U+191A8 changed from JURCHEN RADICAL-1..JURCHEN RADICAL-9 to JURCHEN RADICAL-01..JURCHEN RADICAL-09" |
| 18.0 | U+191A0..191D2 | 51 | L2/25-226 | | "Consensus 185-C39", UTC #185 Minutes, 2025-10-29, "UTC accepts for encoding in Unicode 18.0 ..." |

== See also ==
- Jurchen (Unicode block)
