= Tale of the Nisan Shaman =

Manchu folk tale

The Tale of the Nisan Shaman (also spelled "Nishan"; Manchu: ᠨᡳᡧᠠᠨ
ᠰᠠᠮᠠᠨ ᡳ
ᠪᡳᡨᡥᡝ, romanized: nišan saman-i bithe) is a Manchu folk tale about a female shaman who resurrects the son of a rich landowner.

== Versions ==
Variants of the tale are also found among the Evenks, Daurs, and Nanais. The tale was transmitted orally, and manuscripts were rare; Soviet ethnographer Alexander Grebenshchikov managed to purchase two during his early research trips to Northeast China in 1908 and 1909, the first near Qiqihar, and the second at Aigun. He had a third manuscript given to him in Vladivostok in 1913 by a man named Dekdenge. The Qiqihar manuscript shows some unusual features in its orthography; in particular, the verbal tense markers therein are written separately from their base verbs, whereas the standard practise in written Manchu is to write them attached to the base verb. A 1930s ethnographic survey by Johnson Ling of the Academia Sinica (Ling 1934) recorded eighteen different versions of the tale among Nanai tribes on the Songhua River. Volkova (1961), based on Grebenshchikov's manuscript, was the first Russian translation. In 1969, an English translation was made by George Meszoly, a Harvard University undergraduate; however, it was never published. Seong Baek-in (then of Myongji University) made a Korean translation five years later (Seong 1974). The first published English translation, Nowak & Durrant 1977, relied on the annotations in Volkova's and Seong's works but did not refer to Ling's study. A Hungarian translation came out in 1987.

== See also ==
- Shamanism in Siberia
- Shamanism in the Qing dynasty

== Translations ==
- Ling, Johnson/凌純聲 (1934), 松花江下游的赫哲族 [The Goldi Tribe on the lower Sungari River] (in Traditional Chinese), Nanjing: Academia Sinica, OCLC 123364330
- Volkova, Majya Petrovna (1961), Нишань самана битхэ (Предание о нишанской шаманке): Издание текста, перевод и предисловие, Институт народов азии, Академия наук СССР, OCLC 80663066
- 成百仁 [Seong Baek-in] (1974), 滿洲샤만神歌 [Nisan Saman-i Bithe] (in Korean), Myongji University, OCLC 36538543
- Nowak, Margaret C.; Durrant, Stephen W. (1977), The tale of the Nišan shamaness: a Manchu folk epic, Seattle: University of Washington Press, ISBN 978-0-295-95548-3, OCLC 3088755
- Melles, Kornélia (1987), Nisan sámánnõ: mandzsu vajákos szövegek, Prométheusz könyvek, Budapest: Helikon, ISBN 978-963-207-631-7, OCLC 24413692
