= Zhao Zhizhong =

Zhao Zhizhong may refer to:

- Zhao Zhizhong (fencer) (born 1958), Chinese fencer
- Zhao Zhizhong (ethnologist), Chinese ethnology professor
