= Park Se-min =

South Korean footballer (born 2007)

Personal information
- Date of birth: 30 May 2002 (age 24)
- Place of birth: Goyang, South Korea
- Height: 1.86 m (6 ft 1 in)
- Position: Winger

Team information
- Current team: Changwon City FC
- Number: 20

Youth career
- –2014: Galhyeon Elementary School
- 2015–2017: Dongbuk Middle School
- 2018–2020: Jeju SK FC

College career
Years	Team	Apps	(Gls)
2021–2023	Myongji University		

Senior career*
Years	Team	Apps	(Gls)
2024	Daegu FC B	24	(2)
2024	Daegu FC	6	(0)
2025	Siheung Citizen FC	0	(0)
2026–	Changwon City FC	8	(0)
- * Club domestic league appearances and goals as of 29 May 2026

Park Se-min (Korean: 박세민; born 30 May 2002) is a South Korean professional footballer who plays as a winger for Changwon City FC.

== Early life ==
Park was born on 30 May 2002. Born in Goyang, South Korea, he was born to a Romanian mother and a South Korean father. Growing up, he attended Galhyeon Elementary School in South Korea.

Following his stint there, he attended Dongbuk Middle School in South Korea. Subsequently, he attended Myongji University in South Korea.

== Career ==
As a youth player, Park joined the youth academy of Jeju SK FC. Ahead of the 2024 season, he signed for Daegu FC, where he made eight league appearances and scored zero goals.

One year later, he signed for Siheung Citizen FC, where he made zero league appearances and scored zero goals, before signing for Changwon City FC in 2026.
