= Ahn Seon-tae =

South Korean footballer

Personal information
- Full name: Ahn Seon-tae
- Date of birth: 12 May 1983 (age 43)
- Place of birth: Uiryeong, South Korea
- Height: 1.82 m (6 ft 0 in)
- Position: Defender

Team information
- Current team: Daejeon KHNP
- Number: 5

Youth career
- Myongji University

Senior career*
Years	Team	Apps	(Gls)
2006	Gyeongnam FC		
2007–2010	Changwon City FC	16	(4)
2008–2010	→ Police (army)		
2011–2013	Daejeon KHNP		
Korean name
Hangul	안선태
Hanja	安宣泰
RR	An Seontae
MR	An Sŏnt'ae
- * Club domestic league appearances and goals as of 2 Sep 2008

Ahn Seon-tae (Korean: 안선태; born 12 May 1983) is a South Korean former footballer who plays as defender. He retired after 2013 season.
