= Prince Rong =

Qing dynasty princely peerage

Prince Rong of the First Rank

Chinese name
- Traditional Chinese: 和碩榮親王
- Simplified Chinese: 和硕荣亲王
Transcriptions
Standard Mandarin
- Hanyu Pinyin: héshuò róng qīnwáng
- Wade–Giles: ho-shuo jung ch'in-wang

Manchu name
- Manchu script: ᡥᠣᡧᠣᡳ ᡩᡝᡵᡝᠩᡤᡝ ᠴᡳᠨ ᠸᠠᠩ
- Romanization: hošoi derengge cin wang

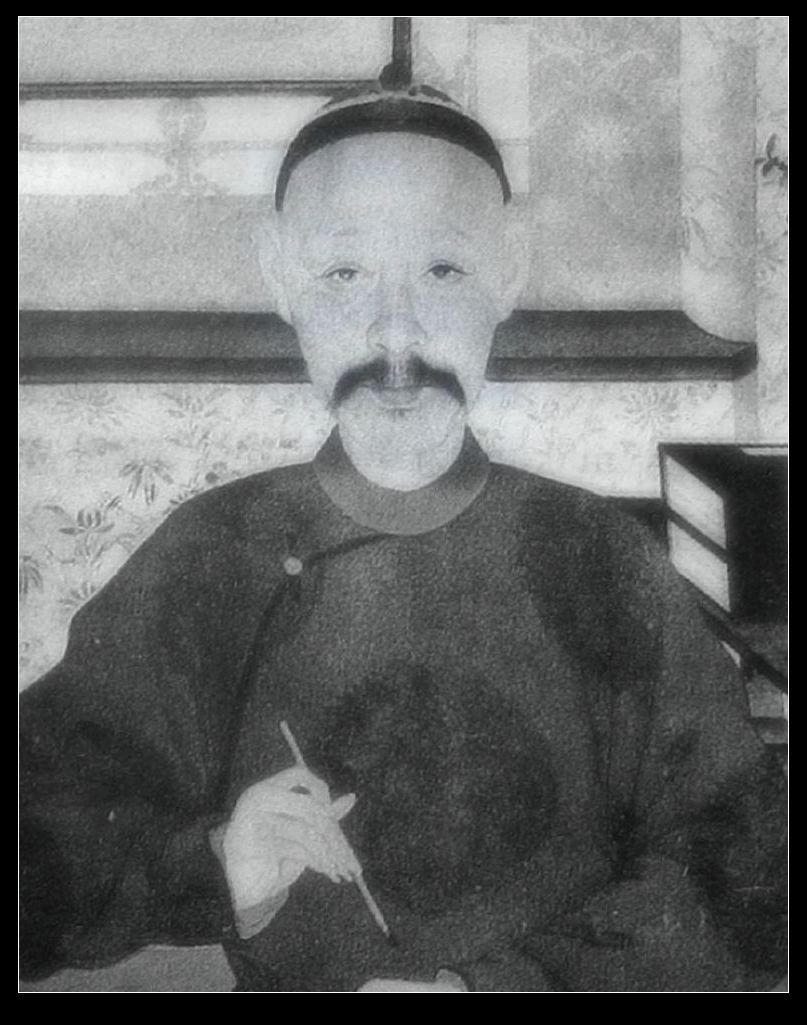
Prince Rong

Prince Rong of the First Rank, or simply Prince Rong, was the title of a princely peerage used in China during the Manchu-led Qing dynasty (1644–1912). As the Prince Rong peerage was not awarded "iron-cap" status, this meant that each successive bearer of the title would normally start off with a title downgraded by one rank vis-à-vis that held by his predecessor. However, the title would generally not be downgraded to any lower than a feng'en fuguo gong except under special circumstances.

The first bearer of the title was Yongqi (1741–1766), the fifth son of the Qianlong Emperor. In 1765, he was awarded the status of a qinwang (prince of the first rank) by his father under the title "Prince Rong of the First Rank". The title was passed down over seven generations and was held by nine persons.

"Prince Rong" may also refer the Shunzhi Emperor's unnamed fourth son (1657–1658), who died as an infant and was given the posthumous title "Prince Rong of the First Rank".

== Members of the Prince Rong peerage ==
- Yongqi (1741–1766), the Qianlong Emperor's fifth son, posthumously honoured as Prince Rongchun of the First Rank (榮純親王)
  - Mianyi (綿億; 1764–1815), Yongqi's fifth son, initially a beile from 1784 to 1799, promoted to junwang in 1799, posthumously honoured as Prince Rongke of the Second Rank (榮恪郡王)
    - Yihui (奕繪; 1799–1838), Mianyi's eldest son, held a beile title from 1815 to 1838
      - Zaijun (載鈞; 1818–1857), Yihui's eldest son, held a beizi title from 1838 to 1857
        - Pumei (溥楣; 1844–1894), Zaichuan's eldest son and Zaijun's adoptive son, held the title of a feng'en zhenguo gong from 1857 to 1866, stripped of his title in 1866
      - Zaizhao (載釗; 1825–1881), Yihui's second son, held the title of a fuguo jiangjun from 1844 to 1881, posthumously honoured as a feng'en zhenguo gong in 1881
        - Puyun (溥芸; 1850–1902), Zaizhao's third son, held the title of a feng'en zhenguo gong from 1866 to 1902
          - Yumin (毓敏; 1878–1912), Puyun's second son, held the title of a feng'en zhenguo gong from 1902 to 1912
            - Hengxu (1899–1966), better known as Jin Guangping, Yujian's son and Yumin's adoptive son, held the title of a feng'en zhenguo gong from 1912 to 1945
        - Puchang (溥菖), Zaizhao's ninth son, held the title of a third class fengguo jiangjun
      - Zaichu (載初; 1832–1881), Yihui's fourth son, held the title of a fuguo jiangjun from 1857 to 1862

== Family tree ==
adoption
Yongqi 永琪 (1741–1766); Prince Rongchun 榮純親王 (1765–1766)
Mianyi 綿億 (1764–1815); Prince Rongke (of the Second Rank) 榮恪郡王 (1784–1815)
Yihui 奕繪 (1799–1838); Beile 貝勒 (1815–1838)
Zaijun 載鈞 (1818–1857); Beizi 貝子 (1839–1857)	Zaizhao 載釗 (1825–1881); Feng'en Zhenguo Gong 奉恩鎮國公 (1881) (posthumously awarded)	Zaichu 載初 (1832–1881); Fuguo Jiangjun 輔國將軍 (1857–1862)
Pumei 溥楣 (1844–1894); Feng'en Zhenguo Gong 奉恩鎮國公 (1857–1866) (stripped of his title)	Puyun 溥芸 (1850–1902); Feng'en Zhenguo Gong 奉恩鎮國公 (1866–1902)	Puchang 溥菖; Third Class Fengguo Jiangjun 三等奉國將軍
Yujian 毓簡	Yumin 毓敏 (1878–1912); Feng'en Zhenguo Gong 奉恩鎮國公 (1902–1912)	Yugeng 毓庚
Hengxu 恆煦 (1899–1966); Feng'en Zhenguo Gong 奉恩鎮國公 (1912–1945)
Qicong 啟孮 (1918–2004)	Qixuan 啟暄 (born 1919)

== See also ==
- Royal and noble ranks of the Qing dynasty
