= Jurchen (Unicode block) =

- Range: U+18E00..U+1919F (928 code points)
- Plane: SMP
- Scripts: Jurchen
- Assigned: 914 code points
- Unused: 14 reserved code points

Unicode Version History
- 18.0 (2026): 914 (+914)

Unicode documentation
- Code chart ∣ Web page

Jurchen is a Unicode block containing Jurchen script characters for the historic Jurchen language.

== Block ==
Jurchen^{[1]}^{[2]} Official Unicode Consortium code chart (PDF)
	0	1	2	3	4	5	6	7	8	9	A	B	C	D	E	F
U+18E0x	𘸀	𘸁	𘸂	𘸃	𘸄	𘸅	𘸆	𘸇	𘸈	𘸉	𘸊	𘸋	𘸌	𘸍	𘸎	𘸏
U+18E1x	𘸐	𘸑	𘸒	𘸓	𘸔	𘸕	𘸖	𘸗	𘸘	𘸙	𘸚	𘸛	𘸜	𘸝	𘸞	𘸟
U+18E2x	𘸠	𘸡	𘸢	𘸣	𘸤	𘸥	𘸦	𘸧	𘸨	𘸩	𘸪	𘸫	𘸬	𘸭	𘸮	𘸯
U+18E3x	𘸰	𘸱	𘸲	𘸳	𘸴	𘸵	𘸶	𘸷	𘸸	𘸹	𘸺	𘸻	𘸼	𘸽	𘸾	𘸿
U+18E4x	𘹀	𘹁	𘹂	𘹃	𘹄	𘹅	𘹆	𘹇	𘹈	𘹉	𘹊	𘹋	𘹌	𘹍	𘹎	𘹏
U+18E5x	𘹐	𘹑	𘹒	𘹓	𘹔	𘹕	𘹖	𘹗	𘹘	𘹙	𘹚	𘹛	𘹜	𘹝	𘹞	𘹟
U+18E6x	𘹠	𘹡	𘹢	𘹣	𘹤	𘹥	𘹦	𘹧	𘹨	𘹩	𘹪	𘹫	𘹬	𘹭	𘹮	𘹯
U+18E7x	𘹰	𘹱	𘹲	𘹳	𘹴	𘹵	𘹶	𘹷	𘹸	𘹹	𘹺	𘹻	𘹼	𘹽	𘹾	𘹿
U+18E8x	𘺀	𘺁	𘺂	𘺃	𘺄	𘺅	𘺆	𘺇	𘺈	𘺉	𘺊	𘺋	𘺌	𘺍	𘺎	𘺏
U+18E9x	𘺐	𘺑	𘺒	𘺓	𘺔	𘺕	𘺖	𘺗	𘺘	𘺙	𘺚	𘺛	𘺜	𘺝	𘺞	𘺟
U+18EAx	𘺠	𘺡	𘺢	𘺣	𘺤	𘺥	𘺦	𘺧	𘺨	𘺩	𘺪	𘺫	𘺬	𘺭	𘺮	𘺯
U+18EBx	𘺰	𘺱	𘺲	𘺳	𘺴	𘺵	𘺶	𘺷	𘺸	𘺹	𘺺	𘺻	𘺼	𘺽	𘺾	𘺿
U+18ECx	𘻀	𘻁	𘻂	𘻃	𘻄	𘻅	𘻆	𘻇	𘻈	𘻉	𘻊	𘻋	𘻌	𘻍	𘻎	𘻏
U+18EDx	𘻐	𘻑	𘻒	𘻓	𘻔	𘻕	𘻖	𘻗	𘻘	𘻙	𘻚	𘻛	𘻜	𘻝	𘻞	𘻟
U+18EEx	𘻠	𘻡	𘻢	𘻣	𘻤	𘻥	𘻦	𘻧	𘻨	𘻩	𘻪	𘻫	𘻬	𘻭	𘻮	𘻯
U+18EFx	𘻰	𘻱	𘻲	𘻳	𘻴	𘻵	𘻶	𘻷	𘻸	𘻹	𘻺	𘻻	𘻼	𘻽	𘻾	𘻿
U+18F0x	𘼀	𘼁	𘼂	𘼃	𘼄	𘼅	𘼆	𘼇	𘼈	𘼉	𘼊	𘼋	𘼌	𘼍	𘼎	𘼏
U+18F1x	𘼐	𘼑	𘼒	𘼓	𘼔	𘼕	𘼖	𘼗	𘼘	𘼙	𘼚	𘼛	𘼜	𘼝	𘼞	𘼟
U+18F2x	𘼠	𘼡	𘼢	𘼣	𘼤	𘼥	𘼦	𘼧	𘼨	𘼩	𘼪	𘼫	𘼬	𘼭	𘼮	𘼯
U+18F3x	𘼰	𘼱	𘼲	𘼳	𘼴	𘼵	𘼶	𘼷	𘼸	𘼹	𘼺	𘼻	𘼼	𘼽	𘼾	𘼿
U+18F4x	𘽀	𘽁	𘽂	𘽃	𘽄	𘽅	𘽆	𘽇	𘽈	𘽉	𘽊	𘽋	𘽌	𘽍	𘽎	𘽏
U+18F5x	𘽐	𘽑	𘽒	𘽓	𘽔	𘽕	𘽖	𘽗	𘽘	𘽙	𘽚	𘽛	𘽜	𘽝	𘽞	𘽟
U+18F6x	𘽠	𘽡	𘽢	𘽣	𘽤	𘽥	𘽦	𘽧	𘽨	𘽩	𘽪	𘽫	𘽬	𘽭	𘽮	𘽯
U+18F7x	𘽰	𘽱	𘽲	𘽳	𘽴	𘽵	𘽶	𘽷	𘽸	𘽹	𘽺	𘽻	𘽼	𘽽	𘽾	𘽿
U+18F8x	𘾀	𘾁	𘾂	𘾃	𘾄	𘾅	𘾆	𘾇	𘾈	𘾉	𘾊	𘾋	𘾌	𘾍	𘾎	𘾏
U+18F9x	𘾐	𘾑	𘾒	𘾓	𘾔	𘾕	𘾖	𘾗	𘾘	𘾙	𘾚	𘾛	𘾜	𘾝	𘾞	𘾟
U+18FAx	𘾠	𘾡	𘾢	𘾣	𘾤	𘾥	𘾦	𘾧	𘾨	𘾩	𘾪	𘾫	𘾬	𘾭	𘾮	𘾯
U+18FBx	𘾰	𘾱	𘾲	𘾳	𘾴	𘾵	𘾶	𘾷	𘾸	𘾹	𘾺	𘾻	𘾼	𘾽	𘾾	𘾿
U+18FCx	𘿀	𘿁	𘿂	𘿃	𘿄	𘿅	𘿆	𘿇	𘿈	𘿉	𘿊	𘿋	𘿌	𘿍	𘿎	𘿏
U+18FDx	𘿐	𘿑	𘿒	𘿓	𘿔	𘿕	𘿖	𘿗	𘿘	𘿙	𘿚	𘿛	𘿜	𘿝	𘿞	𘿟
U+18FEx	𘿠	𘿡	𘿢	𘿣	𘿤	𘿥	𘿦	𘿧	𘿨	𘿩	𘿪	𘿫	𘿬	𘿭	𘿮	𘿯
U+18FFx	𘿰	𘿱	𘿲	𘿳	𘿴	𘿵	𘿶	𘿷	𘿸	𘿹	𘿺	𘿻	𘿼	𘿽	𘿾	𘿿
U+1900x	𙀀	𙀁	𙀂	𙀃	𙀄	𙀅	𙀆	𙀇	𙀈	𙀉	𙀊	𙀋	𙀌	𙀍	𙀎	𙀏
U+1901x	𙀐	𙀑	𙀒	𙀓	𙀔	𙀕	𙀖	𙀗	𙀘	𙀙	𙀚	𙀛	𙀜	𙀝	𙀞	𙀟
U+1902x	𙀠	𙀡	𙀢	𙀣	𙀤	𙀥	𙀦	𙀧	𙀨	𙀩	𙀪	𙀫	𙀬	𙀭	𙀮	𙀯
U+1903x	𙀰	𙀱	𙀲	𙀳	𙀴	𙀵	𙀶	𙀷	𙀸	𙀹	𙀺	𙀻	𙀼	𙀽	𙀾	𙀿
U+1904x	𙁀	𙁁	𙁂	𙁃	𙁄	𙁅	𙁆	𙁇	𙁈	𙁉	𙁊	𙁋	𙁌	𙁍	𙁎	𙁏
U+1905x	𙁐	𙁑	𙁒	𙁓	𙁔	𙁕	𙁖	𙁗	𙁘	𙁙	𙁚	𙁛	𙁜	𙁝	𙁞	𙁟
U+1906x	𙁠	𙁡	𙁢	𙁣	𙁤	𙁥	𙁦	𙁧	𙁨	𙁩	𙁪	𙁫	𙁬	𙁭	𙁮	𙁯
U+1907x	𙁰	𙁱	𙁲	𙁳	𙁴	𙁵	𙁶	𙁷	𙁸	𙁹	𙁺	𙁻	𙁼	𙁽	𙁾	𙁿
U+1908x	𙂀	𙂁	𙂂	𙂃	𙂄	𙂅	𙂆	𙂇	𙂈	𙂉	𙂊	𙂋	𙂌	𙂍	𙂎	𙂏
U+1909x	𙂐	𙂑	𙂒	𙂓	𙂔	𙂕	𙂖	𙂗	𙂘	𙂙	𙂚	𙂛	𙂜	𙂝	𙂞	𙂟
U+190Ax	𙂠	𙂡	𙂢	𙂣	𙂤	𙂥	𙂦	𙂧	𙂨	𙂩	𙂪	𙂫	𙂬	𙂭	𙂮	𙂯
U+190Bx	𙂰	𙂱	𙂲	𙂳	𙂴	𙂵	𙂶	𙂷	𙂸	𙂹	𙂺	𙂻	𙂼	𙂽	𙂾	𙂿
U+190Cx	𙃀	𙃁	𙃂	𙃃	𙃄	𙃅	𙃆	𙃇	𙃈	𙃉	𙃊	𙃋	𙃌	𙃍	𙃎	𙃏
U+190Dx	𙃐	𙃑	𙃒	𙃓	𙃔	𙃕	𙃖	𙃗	𙃘	𙃙	𙃚	𙃛	𙃜	𙃝	𙃞	𙃟
U+190Ex	𙃠	𙃡	𙃢	𙃣	𙃤	𙃥	𙃦	𙃧	𙃨	𙃩	𙃪	𙃫	𙃬	𙃭	𙃮	𙃯
U+190Fx	𙃰	𙃱	𙃲	𙃳	𙃴	𙃵	𙃶	𙃷	𙃸	𙃹	𙃺	𙃻	𙃼	𙃽	𙃾	𙃿
U+1910x	𙄀	𙄁	𙄂	𙄃	𙄄	𙄅	𙄆	𙄇	𙄈	𙄉	𙄊	𙄋	𙄌	𙄍	𙄎	𙄏
U+1911x	𙄐	𙄑	𙄒	𙄓	𙄔	𙄕	𙄖	𙄗	𙄘	𙄙	𙄚	𙄛	𙄜	𙄝	𙄞	𙄟
U+1912x	𙄠	𙄡	𙄢	𙄣	𙄤	𙄥	𙄦	𙄧	𙄨	𙄩	𙄪	𙄫	𙄬	𙄭	𙄮	𙄯
U+1913x	𙄰	𙄱	𙄲	𙄳	𙄴	𙄵	𙄶	𙄷	𙄸	𙄹	𙄺	𙄻	𙄼	𙄽	𙄾	𙄿
U+1914x	𙅀	𙅁	𙅂	𙅃	𙅄	𙅅	𙅆	𙅇	𙅈	𙅉	𙅊	𙅋	𙅌	𙅍	𙅎	𙅏
U+1915x	𙅐	𙅑	𙅒	𙅓	𙅔	𙅕	𙅖	𙅗	𙅘	𙅙	𙅚	𙅛	𙅜	𙅝	𙅞	𙅟
U+1916x	𙅠	𙅡	𙅢	𙅣	𙅤	𙅥	𙅦	𙅧	𙅨	𙅩	𙅪	𙅫	𙅬	𙅭	𙅮	𙅯
U+1917x	𙅰	𙅱	𙅲	𙅳	𙅴	𙅵	𙅶	𙅷	𙅸	𙅹	𙅺	𙅻	𙅼	𙅽	𙅾	𙅿
U+1918x	𙆀	𙆁	𙆂	𙆃	𙆄	𙆅	𙆆	𙆇	𙆈	𙆉	𙆊	𙆋	𙆌	𙆍	𙆎	𙆏
U+1919x	𙆐	𙆑														
Notes 1.As of Unicode version 18.0 2.Grey areas indicate non-assigned code points

== History ==
The following Unicode-related documents record the purpose and process of defining specific characters in the Jurchen block:

Version	Final code points (Note: Proposed code points and characters names may differ from final code points and names)	Count	L2 ID	WG2 ID	Document
18.0	U+18E00..19191	914	L2/09-147	N3618	Glavy, Jason (2009-01-06), Jurchen Character Repertoire
18.0	U+18E00..19191	914	L2/09-164		Proposal to encode the Jurchen characters, 2009-04-20
18.0	U+18E00..19191	914	L2/09-351	N3628	Proposal to Encode the Jurchen Characters, 2009-04-20
18.0	U+18E00..19191	914	L2/09-167	N3639	Anderson, Deborah (2009-04-22), Jurchen Ad hoc report
18.0	U+18E00..19191	914	L2/09-234	N3603 (pdf, doc)	Umamaheswaran, V. S. (2009-07-08), "6.5 Jurchen: U+18E49 stroke count", Unconfirmed minutes of WG 2 meeting 54
18.0	U+18E00..19191	914	L2/09-352	N3688	Additional Information for the Proposal on Jurchen Characters, 2009-09-29
18.0	U+18E00..19191	914	L2/09-349	N3696	Review of Jurchen Proposal (Documents N3628 and N3688), 2009-10-21
18.0	U+18E00..19191	914	L2/09-418	N3720	A Quick Response to WG2n3696: Review of Jurchen Proposal (Documents N3628 and N3688), 2009-10-26
18.0	U+18E00..19191	914	L2/10-101	N3788	Revised Proposal to Encode the Jurchen Characters in UCS, 2010-01-26
18.0	U+18E00..19191	914	L2/10-125	N3817	West, Andrew (2010-04-15), Review of Revised Proposal to Encode Jurchen
18.0	U+18E00..19191	914	L2/11-211	N4077	West, Andrew (2011-05-24), Sources for the encoding of Jurchen
18.0	U+18E00..19191	914	L2/17-107	N4795	Everson, Michael (2017-05-03), Towards an encoding of the Jurchen script and implications for Khitan Small Script
18.0	U+18E00..19191	914	L2/17-153		Anderson, Deborah (2017-05-17), "13. Jurchen and Khitan Small Script", Recommendations to UTC #151 May 2017 on Script Proposals
18.0	U+18E00..19191	914	L2/21-049	N5131	Sun, Bojun; Nie, Hongyin; Jing, Yongshi (2020-02-10), A Supplementary Proposal to Encode the Jurchen Characters in UCS
18.0	U+18E00..19191	914	L2/21-130		Anderson, Deborah; Whistler, Ken; Pournader, Roozbeh; Liang, Hai (2021-07-26), "19 Jurchen", Recommendations to UTC #168 July 2021 on Script Proposals
18.0	U+18E00..19191	914	L2/23-068	N5207	West, Andrew (2023-03-15), Towards an Encoding of the Jurchen Script
18.0	U+18E00..19191	914	L2/23-083		Anderson, Deborah; Kučera, Jan; Whistler, Ken; Pournader, Roozbeh; Constable, Peter (2023-04-21), "12 Jurchen", Recommendations to UTC #175 April 2023 on Script Proposals
18.0	U+18E00..19191	914	L2/24-139	N5261R	West, Andrew; Sun, Bojun; Zìkù, Zhōnghuá (2024-06-12), Proposal to Encode the Jurchen Script
18.0	U+18E00..19191	914	L2/24-166		Anderson, Deborah; Goregaokar, Manish; Kučera, Jan; Whistler, Ken; Pournader, Roozbeh; Constable, Peter (2024-07-18), "6. Jurchen", Recommendations to UTC #180 July 2024 on Script Proposals
18.0	U+18E00..19191	914	L2/24-159		Constable, Peter (2024-07-29), "Consensus 180-C28", UTC #180 Minutes, "Provisionally assign ..."
18.0	U+18E00..19191	914	L2/25-187		Kučera, Jan; Anderson, Deborah; Pournader, Roozbeh; Constable, Peter; Goregaokar, Manish; Leroy, Robin (2025-07-18), "3.9 Jurchen Large Script", Recommendations to UTC #184 (July 2025) on Script Proposals
18.0	U+18E00..19191	914	L2/25-181		Leroy, Robin (2025-08-07), "Consensus 184-C7", UTC #184 Minutes, "Change the algorithmic name [...] from JURCHEN IDEOGRAPH-XXXXX to JURCHEN CHARACTER-XXXXX ..."
18.0	U+18E00..19191	914	L2/25-226		"Consensus 185-C39", UTC #185 Minutes, 2025-10-29, "UTC accepts for encoding in Unicode 18.0 ..."

== See also ==
- Jurchen Radicals (Unicode block)
