= Hyacinth (Bichurin) =

Russian sinologist, historian, and missionary (1777–1853)

- Иакинф
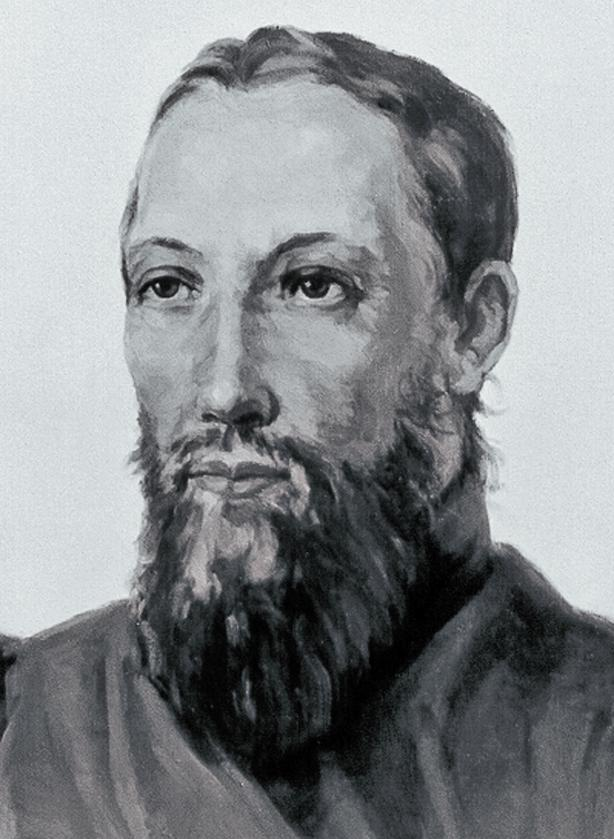
- Portrait by Nikolay Bestuzhev, 1830s
- Born: August 29, 1777; Akulevo, Tsivilsky Uyezd, Kazan Governorate, Russian Empire
- Died: May 11, 1853 (aged 75); Saint Petersburg, Russian Empire

Nikita Yakovlevich Bichurin (Russian: Никита Яковлевич Бичурин; 9 September [O.S. 29 August] 1777 – 23 May [O.S. 11 May] 1853), better known under his archimandrite monastic name Hyacinth, sometimes known as Joacinth or Iakinf, was one of the founding fathers of Russian Sinology. He translated many works from Chinese into Russian, which were then translated into other European languages.

== Biography ==
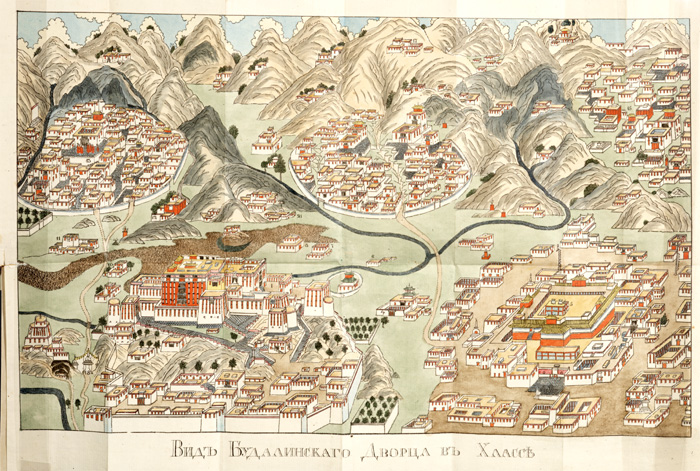
Bichurin's map of Lhasa.

Bichurin was born in Akulevo to a Russian half-Chuvash priest named Iakov and Russian mother Akulina Stepanova. He studied at a church choir school in Sviiazhsk and later at the Kazan Theological Seminary. He also studied Latin, Greek and French and his abilities were noticed by Archbishop Amvrosij Podobedov of the Russian Orthodox Church. He taught in Kazan Theological Seminary from 1799 and was anointed a monk in 1800 with the name of Iakinf or Hyacinth and tonsured, sent to promote Christianity in Beijing, where he spent the next 14 years. The genuine objects of his interest were Chinese history and language. He was forthwith accused of lacking religious zeal, and when he appeared in Irkutsk with his lover Natalia Petrova, some of his students reported him. Complaints over other behaviours considered inappropriate for a priest kept coming. After several changes in the Russian orthodox mission, the Synod declared Bichurin guilty on 4 September 1823, stripped him of his archimandrite monk rank and incarcerated him for life in the Valaam Monastery. Here he translated a number of ancient and medieval Chinese manuscripts, which had previously been unknown in Europe. In succeeding decades he published many volumes on Chinese and Mongolian history, geography, religion (including pioneering the study of Chinese Islam), statistics, and agriculture. After the death of Tsar Alexander I and the rise of Nikolai I in 1825, some of Bichurin's friends helped obtain a royal pardon. They also suggested a position for him as an interpreter in the Foreign Ministry. Bichurin then moved to take up a position in St Petersburg. He was elected as a corresponding member of the Academy of Sciences in 1828 and also became an emeritus librarian at the Petersburg Public Library. In the same year he published a "Description of Tibet in the Modern Age". He continued to clash with the church authorities and refused promotions. Tsar Nikolai I intervened in 1832 and forbade him from refusing promotions and ordered him to live in the Alexander Nevskii monastery.

It was Bichurin who came up with the idea for the name East Turkestan to replace the term "Chinese Turkestan" in 1829. In 1835, he was awarded the Demidov Prize.

In 1837, he opened the first Chinese-language school in the Russian Empire in Kyakhta which helped improve trade between Russia and China. One of his students was Mikhail Shevelev, a tea trader and shipping entrepreneur. For his sinological contributions, he was elected to the Russian, German, and French Academies of Sciences.

== See also ==
- Chinese Orthodox Church

== Sources ==
- Bellér-Hann, Ildikó, ed. (2007). Situating the Uyghurs Between China and Central Asia (illustrated ed.). Ashgate Publishing, Ltd. ISBN 978-0754670414. ISSN 1759-5290.
- Popova, I. F.; Miasnikov, V. S. (2002), "N. Y. Bichurin as a Translator", Far Eastern Affairs, 30 (3): 113–127. Translation of an earlier paper by B. I. Pankratov, with introductory notes.
- Schorkowitz, Dittmar (2026). ”Nikolai Kyuner on Nikita (Iakinf) Bichurin and His Studies on Central Asia (an Unpublished Archival Document).” Crossroads 24(1-2): 139-84. doi:10.1163/26662523-bja10030.
- P. V. Denisov, Nikita Iakovich Bichurin: Ocherk zhizni i nachnoi deitel’nosti. Cheboksary, 1977.
- L. N. Gumilev, M. F. Khvan (compilers), Sobranie svedenii po istoricheskoi geografii Vostochnoi i Sredinnoi Azii Cheboksary : Chuvashskoe Gos. Izd-vo, 1960.
- N. IA. Bichurin (Iakinf), Sobranie svedenii o narodakh, obitavshikh v Srednei Azii v drevnie vremena / Собрание сведений о народах, обитавших в Средней Азии в древние времена, 3 volumes, Moscow : Izd-vo Akademii nauk SSSR, 1950–1953. Originally published: St. Petersburg, 1851. Include map in 3 sheets: Karta k istorii narodov obitavshikh v Srednei Azii v drevnii︠a︡ vremena / Карта к истории народов обитавших в Средней Азии в древния времена
