= Zhao Zhizhong (ethnologist) =

Zhao Zhizhong (simplified Chinese: 赵志忠; traditional Chinese: 趙志忠; pinyin: Zhào Zhìzhōng) is an ethnic-Manchu professor of ethnic languages and literatures, the director of the Institute of Ethnic Literature at Minzu University of China. He is also a researcher at Institute of Shamanic Studies of the Chinese Academy of Social Sciences (CASS), and the vice-president of the Council of the Chinese Academy of Minority Literature. Zhao mainly engages in the research of Chinese shamanism, Manchu studies and Chinese ethnic literature. Over the past three decades, he has published thirteen books and more than one hundred papers in his research fields. In the field of shamanism, his representative books are as follows: Shamanism in China, Manchu Shaman Sacred Songs Research, The Investigation of Manchu Shaman Cultural Heritage, and The World of Shamanism: A Discussion of the Nisan Shaman.
