= Jin Guangping =

Chinese linguist

- feng'en zhenguo gong

Head of the House of Prince Rong peerage
- Tenure: 1912–1945
- Predecessor: Yumin
- Successor: peerage abolished
- Born: Hengxu (恆煦); 1899; Beijing
- Died: 1966 (aged 66–67)
- Father: Yumin (adoptive father)

Jin Guangping or Hengxu (1899–1966) was a Chinese linguist of Manchu ethnicity who is known for his studies of the Jurchen and Khitan languages and scripts.

== Life ==
Jin was a sixth generation descendant of the Qianlong Emperor's fifth son, Yongqi (Prince Rong). In 1911, shortly before the fall of the Qing dynasty, he inherited a ducal title, feng'en zhenguo gong (奉恩鎮國公), from the Prince Rong peerage. After the Republic of China was established, he changed his family name from "Aisin Gioro" to "Jin" ("Jin" means "gold" in Mandarin, just like "Aisin" in Manchu). His son, Jin Qizong, and granddaughter, Aisin-Gioro Ulhicun, are both renowned scholars of Manchu and Jurchen.

Jin died in 1966, during the Cultural Revolution.

== Khitan and Jurchen studies ==
Jin was a pioneer in the research on the Khitan large and small scripts and the Jurchen script. During the 1920s and 1930s a number of memorial inscriptions in unknown scripts had been discovered, but it was not clear what the relationship between these scripts was, and how the newly discovered scripts corresponded to the "large" and "small" Khitan and "large" and "small" Jurchen scripts that were mentioned in the histories of the Liao and Jin dynasties. In 1957 Jin determined that the memorial inscriptions for Emperor Xingzong of Liao and his consort, and of Emperor Daozong of Liao and his consort, were written in a phonetic script influenced by the Old Uyghur alphabet, whereas the memorial of Xiao Xiaozhong which had been discovered in 1951 was written in a logographic script based on Chinese characters. He identified the former script as the Large Khitan script and the latter script as the Small Khitan script, an identification that is now widely accepted.

In 1962 Jin further identified the script used in the Sino-Jurchen Vocabulary of the Bureau of Interpreters (Nǚzhēn Yìyǔ 女真譯語) and on a number of Jin Dynasty monuments as the "large" Jurchen script.

He also collaborated with his son, Jin Qizong, on a comprehensive study of the Jurchen script which was published in 1964.

== Works ==
- 1957. "Jǐnxī Xīgūshān Qìdānwén mùzhì shìyì" 錦西西孤山契丹文墓誌試釋 [Attempt to interpret the Khitan writing on the memorial from Xigushan in Jinxi]; in Kǎogǔ Xuébào 考古學報 [Journal of Archaeology] 1957 no.2 pages 83–84.
- 1962. "Cóng Qìdān dàxiǎozì dào Nǚzhēn dàxiǎozì" 從契丹大小字到女真大小字 [From Khitan large and small scripts to Jurchen large and small scripts]; in Nèiměnggǔ Dàxué Xuébào 內蒙古大學學報 [Journal of Inner Mongolia University] 1962 no.2.
- 1964. With Jin Guangping. Nǚzhēn Yǔyán Wénzì Yánjiū 女真語言文字研究 [Study of Jurchen Language and Script]. Reprint, Beijing: Wenwu Chubanshe, 1980.
- 1996. With Jin Qizong and Aisin Gioro. Àixīnjuéluóshì Sāndài Mǎnzhōuxué Lúnjí 愛新覺羅氏三代滿洲學論集 [Collected Essays on Manchu Studies by Three Generations of the Aisin-Gioro Family]. Yuanfang Press.
- 2002. With Jin Qizong and Aisin Gioro. Àixīnjuéluóshì Sāndài Ā'ěrtàixué Lúnjí 愛新覺羅氏三代阿爾泰學論集 [Collected Essays on Altaic Studies by Three Generations of the Aisin-Gioro Family]. Meizandō.
