= Manchu studies =

Study of the Manchu language and people

Manchu studies or Manjuristics is an academic discipline concerned with the study of the Manchu language, the historical texts written in it during the Qing dynasty (1644–1912), as well as by contemporary Manchu and Sibe people.

The first treatise on the Manchu language was the Elementa linguæ Tartaricæ published in Paris in 1696. The foundations of Manchu studies as scholarly discipline date to the 18th century, when diplomatic and trade relations were established between European countries and China's Qing dynasty. The first major centres of Manchu studies were in France and Russia. An important event was the establishment of a chair in "Tartar Languages and Literatures" at the Collège de France in 1814. The German school had its beginnings in the middle of the 19th century, and by the start of the 20th century it had taken the leading position in Europe.

In the period after the fall of the Qing dynasty in the Xinhai Revolution of 1911–1912, Manchu studies disappeared as an academic field of its own, generally becoming subsumed under Sinology and Mongolian studies. Since the second half of the 20th century it has had a revival as a stand-alone discipline.

Manchu studies disappeared from Mainland China for a while.

Today, the Manchu language is taught at universities in China, South Korea and the United States. Harvard University's Department of East Asian Languages and Civilizations is the only institution in North America with a course in the Manchu language. James Bosson was a prominent modern American scholar of Manchu and Mongolian studies.

== See also ==
- List of manchurologists
- New Qing History
- Researches on Manchu Origins

== Bibliography ==
- Pan, T. A. (2017). "Маньчжуроведение". Большая российская энциклопедия. Электронная версия (in Russian). Archived from the original on 28 February 2018.
