= Hartmut Walravens =

German librarian (born 1944)

director of the International ISBN Agency
- In office 2001–2006

Personal details
- Born: 9 September 1944 Adorf in Diemelsee (Waldeck-Frankenberg)
- Parents: Johannes Walravens, Blacksmith (father); Gerda Walravens, né Albaum (mother)
- Education: 1951-1954: Katholische Volksschule in Esch, Landkreis Köln, Humboldt-Gymnasium Köln.
- Alma mater: University of Cologne and University of Bonn.: starting in the summer semester 1963 he heard: Chinese: Walter Fuchs, Günther Debon Martin Gimm.; Japanese: Günther Debon Herbert Zachert; Mandjurian: Walter Fuchs Prof. Dr. Manfred Götz; Ethnology: Helmut Petri war (1958 - 1973) Inhaber des Lehrstuhls für Völkerkunde an der Universität in Köln. Karl Anton Nowotny.; Mongolian: Michael Weiers; Tibetan: Prof. Klaus Sagaster

Hartmut Walravens (born 1944) is a German librarian. He was the director of the International ISBN Agency ?-2006 and the International ISMN Agency ?-2006. He is presently Chairman of the International ISMN Agency 2006–present.
