= Aisin Gioro Ulhicun =

Chinese linguist of Manchu ethnicity (born 1958)

Chinese name
- Traditional Chinese: 愛新覺羅·烏拉熙春
- Simplified Chinese: 爱新觉罗·乌拉熙春
Transcriptions
Standard Mandarin
- Hanyu Pinyin: Àixīnjuéluó Wūlāxīchūn
- Wade–Giles: Ai^{4}-hsin^{1}-chüeh^{2}-lo^{2} Wu^{1}-la^{1}-hsi^{1}-ch'un^{1}

Japanese name
- Kanji: 吉本 智慧子
Transcriptions
- Romanization: Yoshimoto Chieko

Manchu name
- Manchu script: ᠠᡳ᠌ᠰᡳᠨ ᡤᡳᡠ᠋ᡵᠣ ᡠᠯᡥᡳᠴᡠᠨ

Aisin Gioro Ulhicun (born 1958) is a Chinese linguist of Manchu ethnicity who is known for her studies of the Manchu, Jurchen and Khitan languages and scripts. She is also known as a historian of the Liao and Jin dynasties. Her works include a grammar of Manchu (1983), a dictionary of Jurchen (2003), and a study of Khitan memorial inscriptions (2005), as well as various studies on the phonology and grammar of the Khitan language.

== Biography ==
Aisin Gioro Ulhicun was born in Beijing, the second daughter of Jin Qizong (1918–2004), and the granddaughter of Jin Guangping (1899–1966), both of whom were also renowned scholars of Manchu and Jurchen. She is a direct descendant of the Qianlong Emperor as Jin Guangping was a sixth generation descendant of Qianlong's fifth son, Prince Rongchun (Aisin Gioro Yongqi). Other ancestors include the poet Gu Taiqing, who was the wife of Prince Rongchun's grandson, Aisin Gioro Yihui (1799–1838).

She studied at the Minzu University of China in Beijing, before obtaining a doctorate at Kyoto University in Japan. She worked as a research scholar at the Center for Eurasian Cultural Studies at Kyoto University, and is currently a professor at the Ritsumeikan Asia Pacific University in Beppu.

She now lives in Japan, and is married to Yoshimoto Michimasa (吉本道雅) (born 1959), a Japanese historian of China. Since her marriage she has adopted the Japanese name Yoshimoto Chieko (吉本智慧子). The Japanese given name Chieko means "wisdom", which corresponds to her Manchu given name, Ulhicun, which means "knowledge".

== Jurchen studies ==
One of Aisin Gioro Ulhicun's contributions to the study of Jurchen has been the identification of the Jurchen small script. According to the History of the Jin Dynasty there were two different Jurchen scripts: a "large script" that was devised in 1120 by command of Wanyan Aguda, the first emperor of the Jin dynasty; and a "small script" that was created in 1138 by the Emperor Xizong (r. 1135–1150), but which was first officially used in 1145. It is presumed that the Jurchen large script was modelled on the Khitan large script, and the Jurchen small script was modelled on the Khitan small script, but all the extant examples of Jurchen writing, including the Sino-Jurchen Vocabulary of the Bureau of Interpreters (Nǚzhēn Yìyǔ 女真譯語) and monumental inscriptions, are written in basically the same script, which is similar in form to the Khitan large script. During the 1970s a number of gold and silver paiza were unearthed in China; these all had the same inscription which was assumed to be written in the Khitan small script. She has analysed the inscription on these paiza, and although the structure of the characters is identical to the Khitan small script she concludes that the script is not actually the Khitan small script but is in fact the otherwise unattested Jurchen small script. She argues that this small script was only used briefly during the last five years of the reign of its creator, Emperor Xizong, and when he was murdered in a coup d'état the small script fell out of use as it was less convenient to use than the earlier large script.

== Works ==
- 1983. Mǎnyǔ Yǔfǎ 滿語語法 [Grammar of Manchu]. Hohhot: Inner Mongolia People's Press.
- 1985. Mǎnyǔ Dúběn 滿語讀本 [Reader in Manchu]. Hohhot: Inner Mongolia People's Press.
- 1987. Mǎnzú Gǔ Shēnhuà 滿族古神話 [Ancient Manchu Myths]. Hohhot: Inner Mongolia People's Press.
- 1992. Mǎnzhōuyǔ Yǔyīn Yánjiū 滿洲語語音研究 [Phonological Study of Manchu Language]. Tokyo: Genbunsha.
- 1996. Mòdài Zhēnguógōng Àixīnjuéluó Héngxù 末代鎮國公愛新覺羅恆煦 [The Last Duke Defender of the Realm, Aisin Gioro Hengxu]. Tokyo: Asahi Shimbunsha.
- 1996. With Jin Guangping and Jin Qizong. Àixīnjuéluóshì Sāndài Mǎnzhōuxué Lúnjí 愛新覺羅氏三代滿洲學論集 [Collected Essays on Manchu Studies by Three Generations of the Aisin Gioro Family]. Yuanfang Press.
- 2001. Nǚzhēn Wénzìshū Yánjiū 女真文字書研究 [Study of the Jurchen Dictionary]. Fugasha.
- 2002. With Jin Guangping and Jin Qizong. Àixīnjuéluóshì Sāndài Ā'ěrtàixué Lúnjí 愛新覺羅氏三代阿爾泰學論集 [Collected Essays on Altaic Studies by Three Generations of the Aisin Gioro Family]. Meizandō.
- 2002. Nǚzhēn Yǔyán Wénzì Xīn Yánjiū 女真語言文字新研究 [New Study of Jurchen Language and Script]. Meizandō.
- 2003. With Jin Qizong. Nǚzhēnwén Dàcìdiàn 女真文大辞典 [Great Dictionary of Jurchen Language]. Meizandō.
- 2003. With Jin Qizong. Nǚzhēnyǔ Mǎnzhōu-Tōnggǔsī Zhūyǔ Bǐjiào Cídiǎn 女真語·滿洲通古斯諸語比較辭典 [Comparative Dictionary of Manchu-Tungusic Languages].
- 2004. Kittan Moji to Jōshin Wénzì no Rekishiteki Hikaku Kenkyū 契丹文字と女真文字の歴史的比較研究 [Comparative Study of the History of Khitan and Jurchen Scripts].
- 2004. Qìdān Yǔyán Wénzì Yánjiū 契丹語言文字研究 [Study of Khitan Language and Script]. Tokyo: Association of Eastern Literature and History.
- 2004. Liáo-Jīn Shǐ yǔ Qìdān Nǚzhēnwén 遼金史與契丹女真文 [Liao and Jin History and the Khitan and Jurchen Scripts]. Tokyo: Association of Eastern Literature and History.
- 2005. Qìdān Dàzì Yánjiū 契丹大字研究 [Study of the Khitan Large Script]. Tokyo: Association of Eastern Literature and History.
- 2006. Kittanbun Boshi yori Mita Ryōshi 契丹文墓誌より見た遼史 [Study of the History of the Liao Dynasty in Light of Khitan Epitaphs]. Shokado.
- 2007. Kittan Moji to Ryōshi 契丹文字と遼史 [Liao History and the Khitan Script].
- 2009. Àixīnjuéluó Wūlāxīchūn Nǚzhēn Qìdān Xué Yánjiū 愛新覺羅烏拉熙春女真契丹學研究 [Jurchen and Khitan Studies by Aisin Gioro Ulhicun]. Shokado.
- 2009. Mindai no Jōshinjin—'Jōshin Yakugo' kara 'Eineiji Kihi' e— 明代の女真人—《女真訳語》から《永寧寺記碑》へ— [Ming Dynasty Jurchens — From the Jurchen Vocabulary to the Yongning Temple Memorial]. Kyoto: Kyoto University Academic Press.
- 2011. Kittango Shokeitai no Kenkyū 契丹語諸形態の研究 [Study of the Endings in Khitan].
- 2011. With Yoshimoto Michimasa. Hanbandō kara Tagameta Kittan Jōshin 韓半島から眺めた契丹・女真 [Khitan and Jurchen Seen from the Korean Peninsula]. Kyoto: Kyoto University Academic Press.
- 2012. With Yoshimoto Michimasa. 新出契丹史料の研究[A Study of Newly Excavated Khitai Materials]. Shokado.
- 2014. 契丹大小字石刻全釈──金啓孮先生逝去十周年記念叢書II [Total Decipherments of Epitaphs in Khitai Large and Small Scripts: Qin Qizong's Death 10th Anniversary Series Vol.2]. Kyoto: Association of Eastern Literature and History.
- 2014. 女真大字文献彙編──金啓孮先生逝去十周年記念叢書I [A Collection of Materials in Jurchen Large Script: Qin Qizong's Death 10th Anniversary Series Vol.1]. Kyoto: Association of Eastern Literature and History.
