= Seong Baek-in =

South Korean linguist (1933–2018)

- Hangul: 성백인
- Hanja: 成百仁
- RR: Seong Baekin
- MR: Sŏng Paegin

Seong Baek-in (Korean: 성백인; December 7, 1933 – December 19, 2018) was a South Korean linguist who was professor emeritus of linguistics at Seoul National University. His primary area of research is on the Manchu language.

== Career ==
Seong served as a professor at Myongji University from March 1968 to May 1982. The translation of the Tale of the Nisan Shaman into Korean he made while there (Seong 1974) would prove to be an important reference for its later translation into English. In 1982, Seong moved to Seoul National University, where he held various positions including professor from September 1982 to February 1999, dean of the College of Humanities from September 1995 to August 1997, and head of the Altaic Society of Korea from March 1997 to February 2002.

== Outside activities ==
Seong was a member of the advisory committee for the Korean Language Proficiency Test. In 2004, he was awarded the 26th Oe Sol Prize, established in honour of Choe Hyeon-bae by the Oe Sol Foundation.

== Death ==
Seong died on December 19, 2018, at the age of 85.

== Selected publications ==
- 成百仁 (1974), 滿洲샤만神歌 [Nisan Saman-i Bithe] (in Korean), 明知大學出版部 [Myongji University Press], OCLC 36538543. A translation and study of the Tale of the Nisan Shaman.
- 성백인 (1981), 만주어 음운론 연구 [A study on Manchu phonology], 명지대학출판부 [Myongji University Press], OCLC 20259054
- 성백인 (1999), 만주어와 알타이어학 연구 [Studies on Manchu and Altaic Linguistics], 태학사 [Taehaksa], ISBN 978-89-7626-460-2, OCLC 43329661
- 성백인 (2010), 중국의 다구르어와 어웡키어의 문법・어휘 연구 [Grammar and Lexicon of Dagur and Ewenki Spoken in China], 아카넷 [Akanet], ISBN 978-89-5733-177-4
