= Boris Pankratov =

Soviet sinologist

Boris Ivanovich Pankratov (Борис Иванович Панкратов; 1892–1979) was a Soviet Sinologist and Mongolist.

== Academic career ==
Pankratov was a graduate of the Oriental Institute in Vladivostok. In 1919, he went to Hankou, China on the pretext of language practise before moving to Beijing in 1921 to take up a job with the local branch of the Russian Telegraph Agency. In 1923, he took up a position as an interpreter of Chinese, Mongolian, and Tibetan at the Soviet Embassy under Lev Karakhan, serving until his return to the Soviet Union 1935. The following year, he became one of the first scholars of the Manchu section of the Institute of Oriental Studies of the Soviet Academy of Sciences, under A. V. Grebenshchikov. From 1942 to 1948, he again served his government in China, in the Chongqing and Tihua (Urumqi) areas.

Aside from his pure linguistic interests, Pankratov was interested in the history of Russian Sinology, especially the lives of Nikita Bichurin and Vasily Vasilyev. He was also respected for his knowledge of Buddhist art and Buddhist philosophy. Following his death, he left his personal library to the IOS, including a number of rare 17th-century Manchu manuscripts.

== Suspected political activities ==
Pankratov was reportedly quite secretive about his exact activities while living in China, leading to speculation that he was involved in espionage. Various people who knew Pankratov in the 1970s tell a story that he once visited Kumbum Monastery dressed in a monk's robe, carrying a revolver underneath. V. M. Alekseyev claimed that once, when he and Pankratov were eating breakfast at Alexander von Staël-Holstein's house, Pankratov identified himself as serving in the State Political Directorate. One later scholar suggests he may have played some role in Nicholas Roerich's schemes to increase Soviet influence in Tibet, perhaps as a liaison with the Panchen Lama. His former student, Yuri L'vovich Krol', even confirms that Pankratov met with Roerich.

== Selected works ==
- Панкратов, Борис Иванович (1962), Секретная история Монголов, Памятники литературы народов востока, Институт народов Азии, Академия наук СССР, OCLC 6800801. A translation and study of The Secret History of the Mongols.

== Sources ==
- Andreyev, Alexandre (2003), Soviet Russia and Tibet: the debacle of secret diplomacy, 1918-1930s, Brill's Tibetan studies library (4), ISBN 978-90-04-12952-8
- Ipatova, A.; Popova, O. (2008), "Fiftieth Anniversary of the Sinological Library", Far Eastern Affairs, 36 (2): 139–144
- Popova, I. F.; Miasnikov, V. S. (2002), "N. Y. Bichurin as a Translator", Far Eastern Affairs, 30 (3): 113–127
- Кроль, Юрий Львович (1989), "Борис Иванович Панкратов - зарисовка к портрету учителя", Страны и народы Востока, XXVI (3), Москва: ГРВЛ: 84–100
- Маньчжуроведение в Санкт-Петербургском Филиале Института Востоковедения Российской Академии Наук, St. Petersburg: Institute of Oriental Studies, Russian Academy of Sciences, 2005-11-05
