= Alexander Grebenshchikov =

Russian scholar

Aleksandr Vasil'evich Grebenshchikov (Александр Васильевич Гребенщиков; 1880 – 15 October 1941) was a Soviet scholar of the Tungusic languages. He was specifically interested in the origin and development of Manchu writing.

== Education and career ==
He attended the Oriental Institute in Vladivostok beginning in 1902, where he was educated as a Sinologist, and upon his graduation in 1907 began working as an instructor there; he became a full professor in 1918. From 1908 until 1927 he made a number of trips to Northeast China to perform fieldwork. His focus on his work in collecting Manchu folklore led him to miss out on the extent of language shift to Chinese among the Manchu people; from this, he erroneously concluded that the Manchu language was not endangered. He moved to Leningrad in 1935 to work with the Institute of Oriental Studies (IOS) of the Soviet Academy of Sciences. In 1936, he established the Manchu studies section of the IOS, and became its first chairman, with B. I. Pankratov (1892-1979), K. M. Cheremisov (1899-1982), and V. A. Zhebrovsky working under him. He died during the Siege of Leningrad. He was survived by his wife N. A. Grebenshchikova, who donated his personal archives to the IOS.

== Influence ==
Grebenshschikov was one of the last of the early 20th-century Soviet scholars of Manchu to have done his undergraduate education in Sinology; the trend in the mid-20th century was for such scholars to come from a Mongolian studies background. His works on Tungusic languages numbered more than 50, including publication of his еarly collected manuscripts of some important Manchu oral folklore such as the Tale of the Nisan Shaman.
