= Jin Qicong =

Chinese historian and linguist

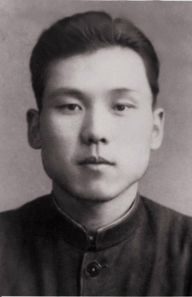
- Student picture of Jin Qicong, circa 1939

Chinese name
- Traditional Chinese: 金啟孮
- Simplified Chinese: 金启孮
Transcriptions
Standard Mandarin
- Hanyu Pinyin: Jīn Qǐcóng

Manchu name
- Manchu script: ᠠᡳ᠌ᠰᡳᠨ ᡤᡳᠣᡵᠣ ᠴᡳᡯᡠᠩ
- Romanization: Aisin Gioro Cidzung

Jin Qicong (Note: The character 孮 in Jin's name is read as cóng according to standard dictionaries, but his name is widely pronounced as Jīn Qǐzōng in academic circles.) or Aisin-Gioro Qicong (Note: Jin did not use the Manchu family name Aisin Gioro (Chinese: 愛新覺羅 Àixīnjuéluó) as part of his Chinese name, but his Manchu name was "Aisin Gioro Qizong", and he is referred to as such in some sources.) (7 June 1918 – 10 April 2004) was a Chinese historian and linguist of Manchu ethnicity who is known for his studies of the Manchu and Jurchen languages. His works include the first modern dictionary of Jurchen (1984), various books about the Manchu people, and editions of the poetry of his great-great-grandfather Aisin-Gioro Yihui (1799–1838) and his wife Gu Taiqing.

== Life ==
Jin was born in Beijing, China in 1918. His father, Jin Guangping (1899–1966), was a sixth-generation descendant of the Qianlong Emperor's fifth son, Yongqi (Prince Rong). Both his father and his second daughter, Aisin-Gioro Ulhicun, are also renowned scholars of Manchu and Jurchen. His eldest daughter, Jin Shi 金適 (Aisin-Gioro Hualiyasun), who is a professor at China Agricultural University in Beijing, has also engaged in research into Jurchen.

Jin Guangping entered Peking University to study Chinese Literature in 1939, but the following year went to Japan to study at Tokyo University, where he studied Jin dynasty history under Mikami Tsugio 三上次男 (1907–1987) and Mongolian and Qing Dynasty history under Wada Sei 和田清 (1890–1963). He graduated in 1944, and returned to China where he worked as a teacher at various Beijing middle schools for fourteen years.

In 1958 he joined the staff of the newly founded Inner Mongolia University, where he remained for the next twenty-five years, eventually reaching the position of professor. His main area of research and teaching was Mongolian history, but he also carried out research into the Jurchen and Manchu languages.

In 1983 he took up a post as director of the Liaoning Minorities Research Institute in Shenyang. During this period he founded and edited two journals, Manchu Studies 满族研究 and Reference Materials for Manchu Studies 满族研究参考资料.

Jin retired in 1989, and lived in Beijing until his death of natural causes in 2004.

== Jurchen studies ==
Jin and his father, Jin Guangping, collaborated on a study of the Jurchen language and script, which was first published in 1964, and a revised edition published in 1980. His major contribution to Jurchen studies was a Jurchen-Chinese dictionary that was published in 1984. This was the first modern dictionary of Jurchen, and remained the only dictionary of Jurchen until 2003 when an expanded Jurchen dictionary compiled by Jin and his daughter, Aisin-Gioro Ulhicun, was published in Japan.

== Works ==
- 1964. With Jin Guangping. Nǚzhēn Yǔyán Wénzì Yánjiū 女真語言文字研究 [Study of Jurchen Language and Script]. Reprint, Beijing: Wenwu Chubanshe, 1980.
- 1981. Mǎnzú de Lìshǐ yǔ Shēnghuó—Sānjiāzitún Diàochá Bàogào 滿族的歷史與生活—三家子屯調查報告 [Manchu History and Life—Report on an Investigation of Sanjiazi Village]. Heilongjiang People's Publishing House.
- 1984. Nǚzhēnwén Cìdiàn 女真文辞典 [Dictionary of Jurchen]. Beijing: Wenwu Chubanshe.
- 1989. Běijīng Jiāoqū de Mǎnzú 北京郊區的滿族 [Manchus in the Beijing Suburbs]. Inner Mongolia University Press.
- 1989. Miàoliánjí yǔ Xiěchūn Jīngshè Cí 妙蓮集與寫春精舍詞 [Miaolian Collection and the Poetry of Xiechun Jingshe]. Liaoning Classics Press.
- 1990. Shěnshuǐ Jí 瀋水集 [Shenshui Collection]. Inner Mongolia University Press.
- 1991. Mònán Jí 漠南集 [Monan Collection]. Inner Mongolia University Press.
- 1995. Míngshàntáng Wénjí Jiǎojiān 明善堂文集校箋 [Edited Collection of Mingshantang]. Tianjin Classics Press.
- 1996. With Jin Guangping and Aisin Gioro. Àixīnjuéluóshì Sāndài Mǎnzhōuxué Lúnjí 愛新覺羅氏三代滿洲學論集 [Collected Essays on Manchu Studies by Three Generations of the Aisin-Gioro Family]. Yuanfang Press.
- 1998. Běijīng Chéngqū de Mǎnzú 北京城區的滿族 [Manchus in the Beijing City]. Liaoning People's Publishing House.
- 2000. Qīngdài Měnggǔshǐ Zhájì 清代蒙古史札記 [Notes on Qing Dynasty Mongolian History]. Inner Mongolia People's Publishing House.
- 2000. Zhōngguó Shuāijiāoshǐ 中國摔跤史 [History of China Falling Down]. Inner Mongolia People's Publishing House.
- 2001. Gù Tàiqīng yǔ Hǎidiàn 顧太清與海澱 [Gu Taiqing and Haidian]. Beijing Press.
- 2001. Tiānyóugé Jí 天游閣集 [Tianyouge Collection]. Liaoning People's Publishing House.
- 2002. With Jin Guangping and Aisin Gioro. Àixīnjuéluóshì Sāndài Ā'ěrtàixué Lúnjí 愛新覺羅氏三代阿爾泰學論集 [Collected Essays on Altaic Studies by Three Generations of the Aisin-Gioro Family]. Meizandō.
- 2003. With Aisin Gioro. Nǚzhēnwén Dàcìdiàn 女真文大辞典 [Great Dictionary of Jurchen Language]. Osaka: Meizandō.
- 2003. With Aisin Gioro. Nǚzhēnyǔ Mǎnzhōu-Tōnggǔsī Zhūyǔ Bǐjiào Cídiǎn 女真語·滿洲通古斯諸語比較辭典 [Comparative Dictionary of Manchu-Tungusic Languages].
- 2003. Méi yuán jí 梅園集 [Meiyuan Collection]. Harbin Press.
- 2009. Jīn Qǐzōng Tán Běijīng de Mǎnzú 金啟孮談北京的滿族 [Ji Qizong Talks about the Manchus of Beijing]. Zhonghua Shuju.
