= Myongji University =

Christian university in South Korea

- 명지대학교
- Type: Private, Christian university
- Established: 1948; 78 years ago
- President: Lim Yeon-soo Ph.D.
- Undergraduates: 22,023
- Postgraduates: 2,625
- Location: Seoul, South Korea; 37°34′51″N 126°55′26″E
- Campus: Urban
- Colors: Blue
- Nickname: MJU
- Mascot: White Stallion
- Website: www.mju.ac.kr

Korean name
- Hangul: 명지대학교
- Hanja: 明知大學校
- RR: Myeongji daehakgyo
- MR: Myŏngji taehakkyo

Myongji University (Korean: 명지대학교) is a private, Christian university founded in 1948 in South Korea. It provides higher education in the fields of engineering, sciences and humanities. It has two campuses: the Social Science Campus is located in Seoul and the Natural Science Campus is in Yongin which is 35 kilometres (22 mi) south of the capital. It consists of 10 colleges, 42 departments, seven faculties and eight specialized postgraduate programs.

Myongji University has been a center for practical humanism over the past half century, and is operating various and practical globalization programs while having exchange with 150 universities in 22 countries.

== History ==
Myongji University was originally founded as Seoul Primary College of Home Economics, established by Moo-gung Institution in 1948 and in 1953, it established Geunhwa Women's Primary College. In 1955, its name was changed to Seoul's Primary Women's College. In 1956, it was reorganized as a coeducation school, Seoul College of Education of Liberal Arts and Science. Then, Christian founding spirit and education policy was implemented. With reorientation towards vocational studies, its name was changed again to Seoul Practical College of Liberal Arts and Science in 1962.

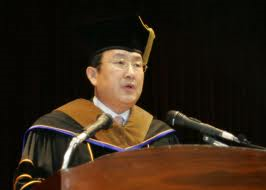
Myongji University President You Byong-Jin, August 2014

The school's name was changed from Moo-gung Institution to Myongji Institution based on Christian faith. After the inauguration of President Sang-geun You in 1964, its name changed to Myongji University. After being approved as a four-year University, institution planned and designed the 10 Developmental Programs including building new lecture halls, making and reorganizing departments, establishing graduate schools, etc.

Memorial Arch status raised to university on September 8, 1983, and made departments of politics and home economics, modified department quota. By active support of Myongji Institute, Yongin Campus was built and made growth such as founding of affiliated facility, Extension University dividing natural and social science campus in two different campuses.

On September 13, 1994, the Arts and Design Center was built in industry-academia cooperation of Myongji University and Nasan Group. Myongji University staged a New Millennium Proclamation Ceremony to support the creative epistemic community.

== Symbol and mascot ==
The leafed tree symbolizes the founding motive of the Myong Ji Educational Foundation to imbue the students with the Christian faith, so that they may become more capable leaders who can contribute to the advancement of our culture and national prosperity in the hopes of the realization of world peace.

The white stallion is a symbol of loyalty, courage, obedience, and purity. It is also a reference to the equestrian origins of the Korean people. The school mascot is, therefore, a representation of the profound hope that Myongjians, like the white stallion, will be steeped in such virtues as loyalty, courage, obedience, and purity as they gallop into the world for the realization of God's kingdom here on earth.

== Organization ==
=== Undergraduate Colleges and Departments ===
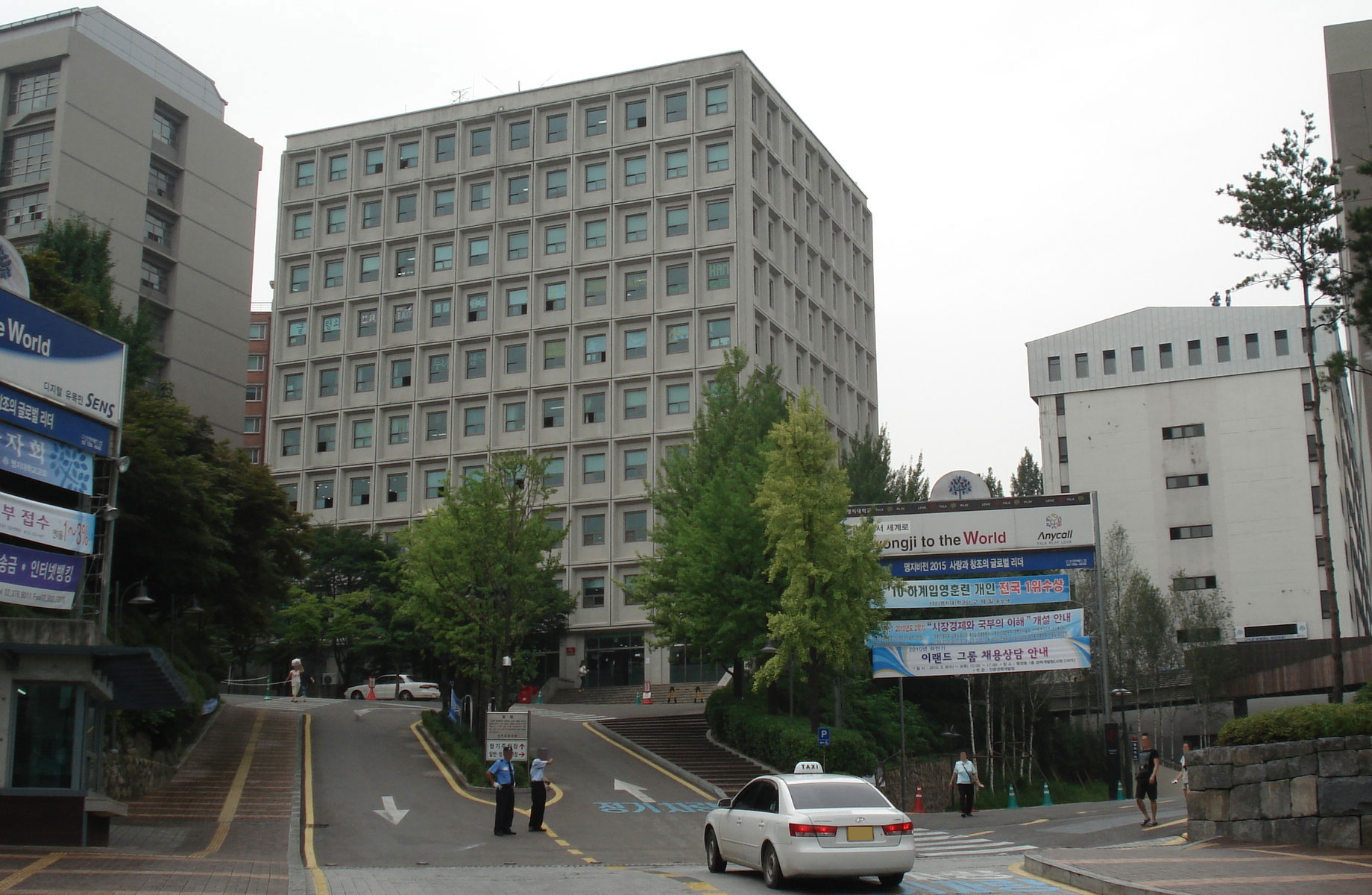
Myongji University's Student Union Hall, Seoul

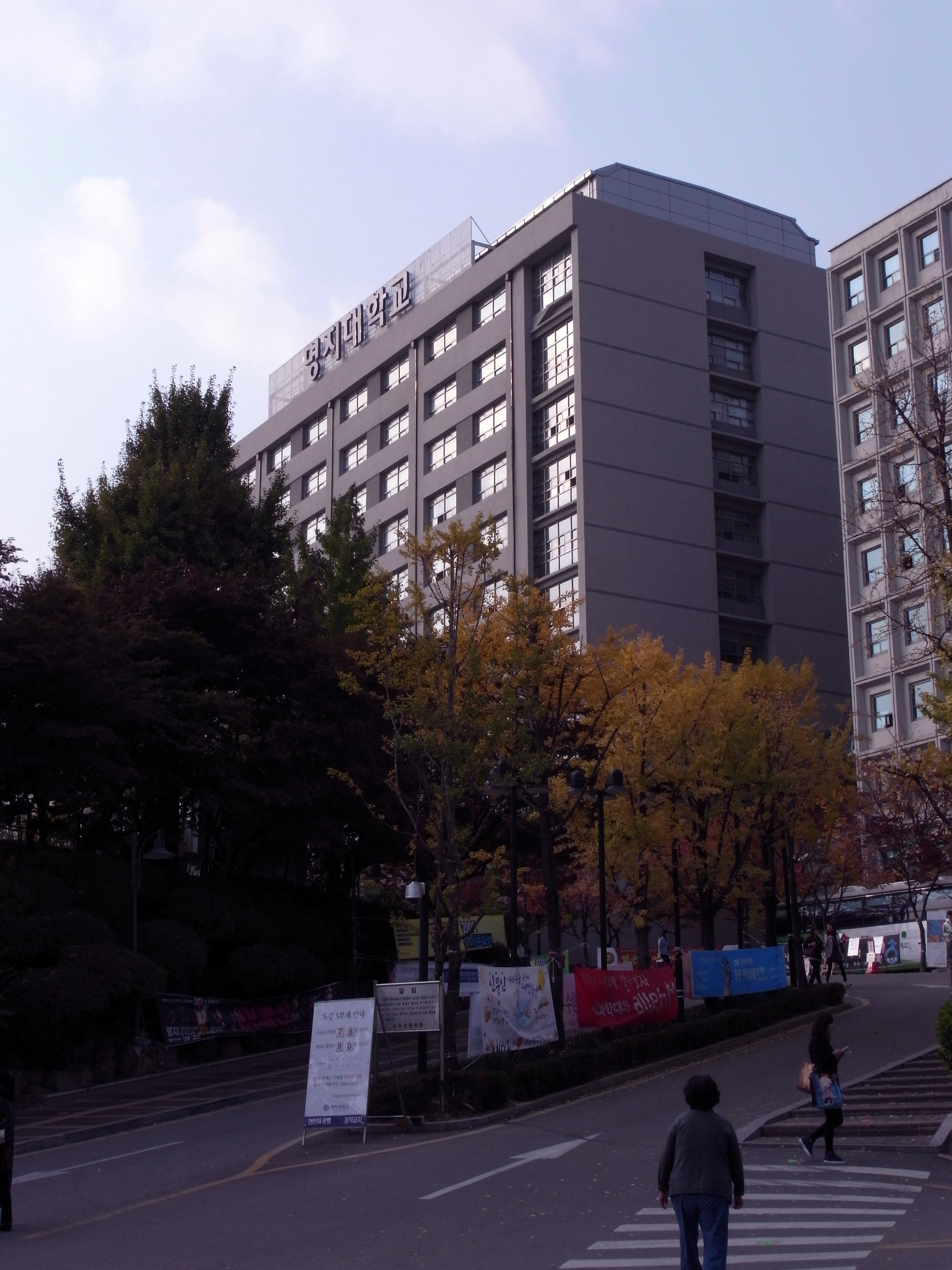
One of Myongji University's college buildings, Seoul

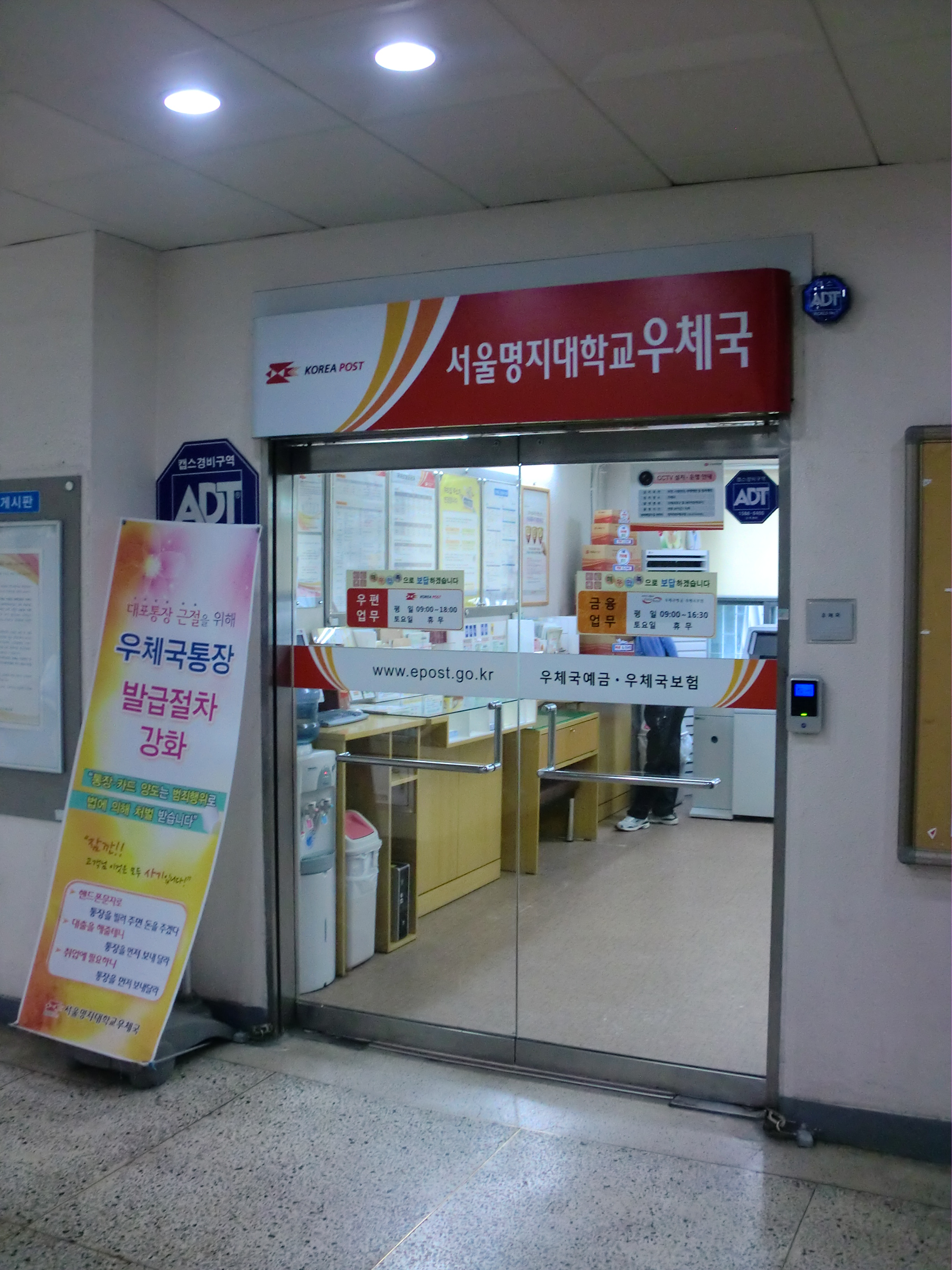
Myongji University Post Office, Seoul

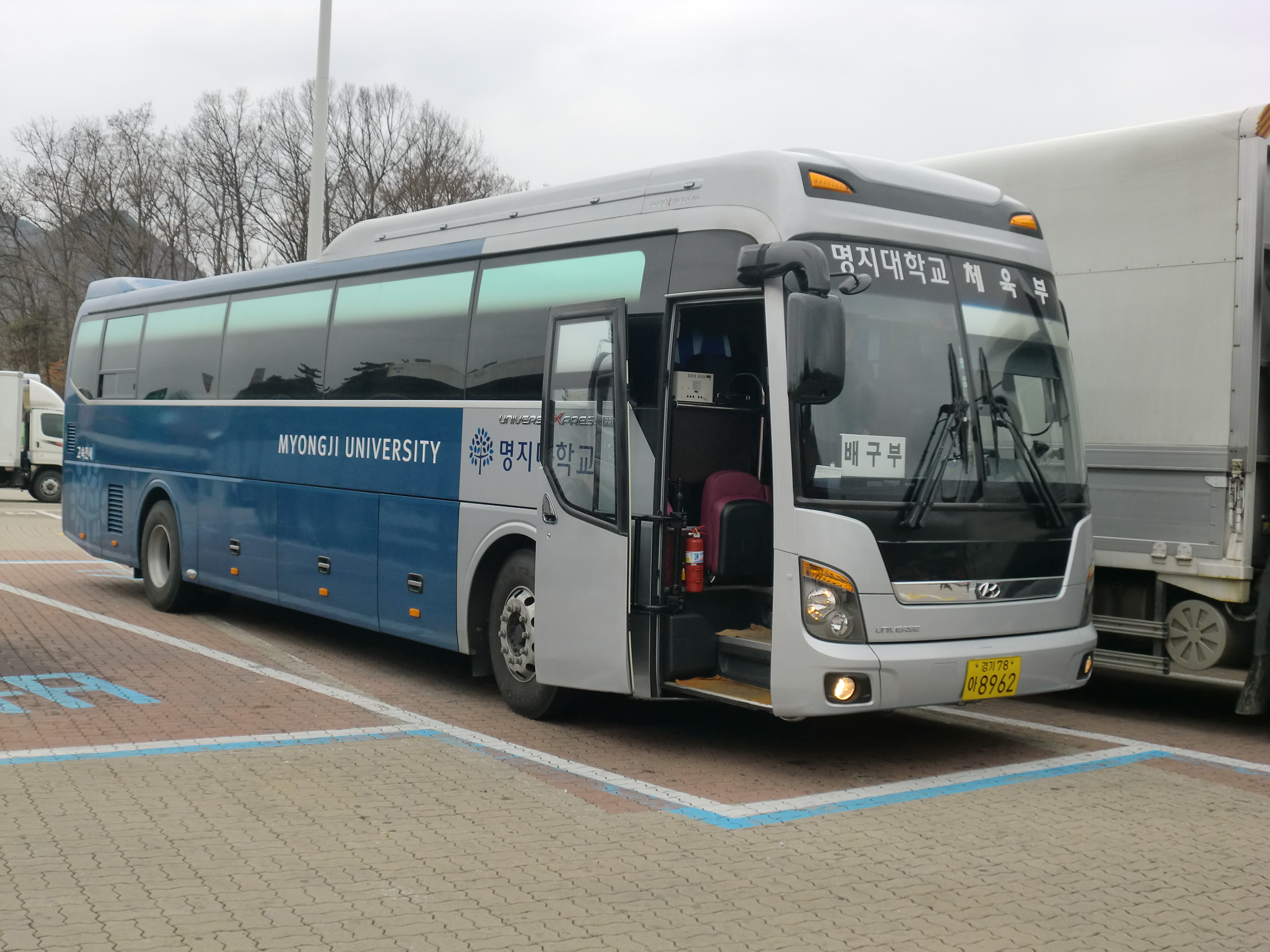
Myongji University Bus

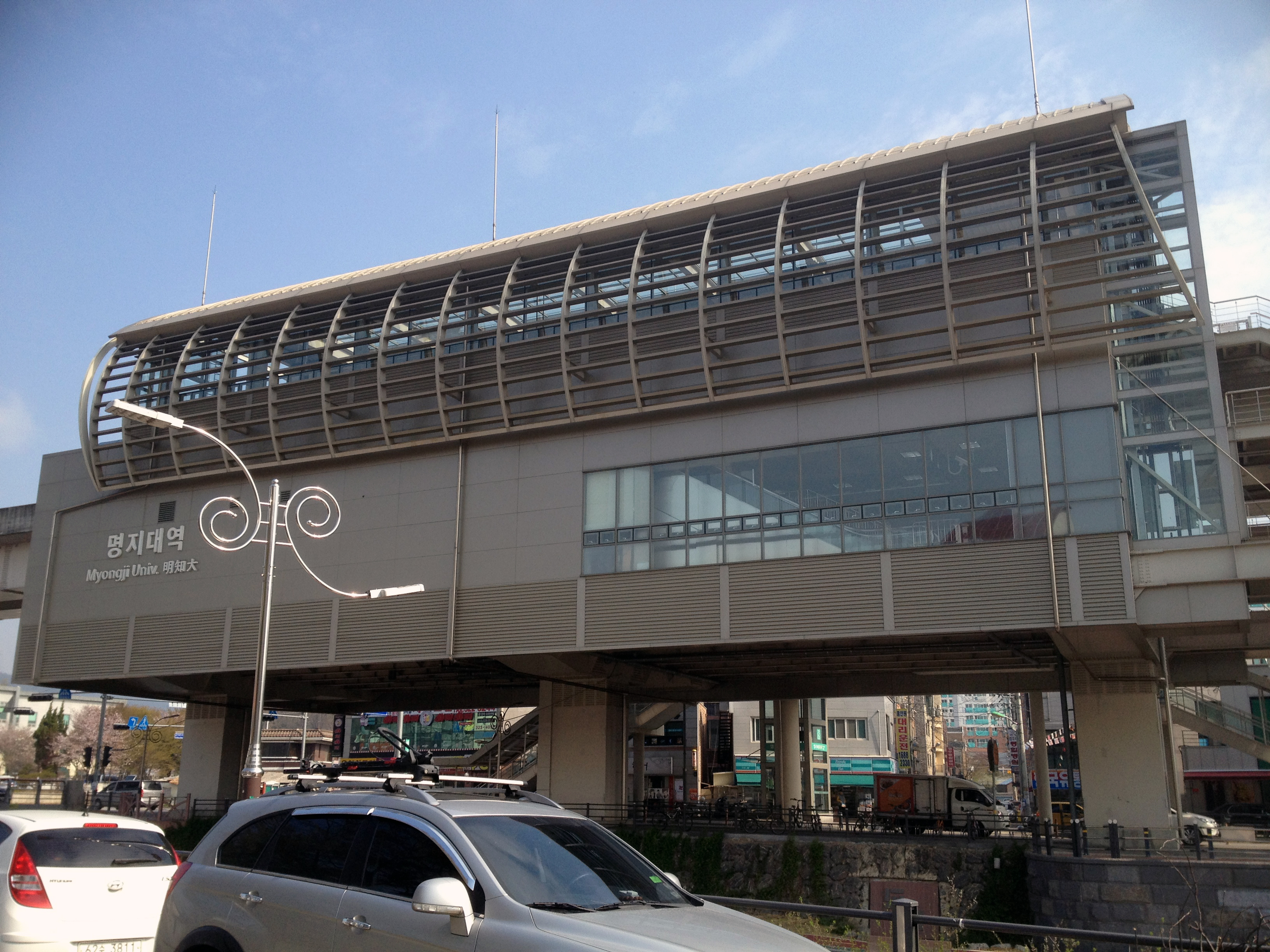
Myongji University Train Station, Yongin

- College of Humanities
  - Korean Language and Literature
  - History
  - Library & Information Science
  - Japanese Language and Literature
  - Creative Writing
  - Arabic Studies
  - Art History
  - Chinese Language and Literature
  - English Language and Literature
  - Philosophy
- College of Social Science
  - Public Administration
  - Digital Media
  - North Korean Studies
  - Political Science and Diplomacy
  - Youth Education and Leadership
  - Child Development and Education
  - Economics
  - Department of Social Welfare
- College of Business Administration
  - Business Administration
  - International Business and Trade
  - Real Estate
  - Management Information
- College of Engineering
  - Electrical Engineering
  - Civil and Environmental Engineering
  - Chemical Engineering
  - Industrial and Management Engineering
  - Computer Engineering
  - Communication Engineering
  - Mechanical Engineering
  - Environmental Engineering and Biotechnology
  - Electronics Engineering
  - Transportation Engineering
  - Materials Science & Engineering
- College of Natural Science
  - Mathematics
  - Division of Biosciences and Bioinformatics
  - Food and Nutrition
  - Chemistry
  - Physics
- College of Arts and Physical Education
  - Division of Design
  - Division of Film and Musical (formerly, Division of Culture and Arts)
  - Baduk Studies
  - Division of Music
  - Division of Physical Education, Sport and Leisure Studies
- College of Architecture
  - Division of Architecture
  - Space Design
- Bangmok College of General Education
  - Division of general education in social science campus
  - Division of Open Major in Social Sciences
  - Division of general education in natural science campus
  - Division of Open Major in Natural Sciences
  - Department of Teacher Training

=== Baduk studies ===
The Department of Baduk studies was established in 1997, to pursue an academic study of baduk.

The department's curriculum explores the nature of baduk, technical theory, practical matches, related fields, baduk education, and professional administration.

In 1997, Baduk Instruction Studies was established in the College of Arts and Physical Education as a course. In 1998 it was promoted as an independent department in the College of Arts and Physical Science, The enrollment quota was increased to 30, in 1999. In 2000 the first Bachelor of Arts in Baduk Studies appeared and in 2001 the Graduate School of Baduk Studies was opened. By 2003 the first Master of Arts in Baduk Studies appeared.

=== Graduate school ===
- College of Law
- Graduate School of Education
- Graduate School of Archival Sciences
- Graduate School of Social Education
- Graduate School of Social Welfare
- Graduate School of Industrial Technology
- Graduate School of Distribution & Logistics
- Graduate School of Business and Economics in Information
- Graduate School of Investment Information

== Notable alumni ==
=== Linguistics ===
- Seong Baek-in (1968–1982), scholar of the Manchu language

=== Politics ===
- Song Ja, politician and academic

=== Sports ===
- Park Ji-sung, retired footballer, former South Korean national team captain and midfielder for Manchester United
- Ahn Seon-tae, retired footballer
- Cho Hyung-ik, footballer for Daegu FC
- Chu Jung-hyun, footballer for Mokpo City FC
- Han Tae-you, footballer
- Jeon Kwang-jin, footballer
- Kim Bong-rae, footballer for Jeju United
- Kim Jung-hyuk, retired footballer
- Kim Kyung-rae, retired footballer
- Kim Min-kyun, footballer for FC Anyang
- Koo Bon-sang, footballer for FC Anyang
- Na Kwang-hyun, footballer
- Park Jae-hong, footballer
- Jung Dae-young, volleyball player for Gimcheon Korea Expressway Corporation Hi-Pass

=== Music ===
- Lee Taemin (SHINee)
- Key (SHINee)
- Kim Jong-hyun (SHINee)
- Kim Junsu (TVXQ and JYJ)
- Kim Kwang-seok
- Baekhyun (EXO)
- Jeon Boram (T-ara)
- Kim Ye-won (Jewelry)
- Kim Yu-bin (Wonder Girls)
- Lee Donghae (Super Junior)
- Lee Moon-se
- Lee Sung-min (Super Junior)
- Qri (T-ara)
- Sim Soo-bong
- Teddy Park
- Yoon Bo-ra (Sistar)
- Yunho (TVXQ)
- Sandeul (B1A4)
- Yoon Ji-sung (Wanna One)
- Lina (The Grace and Isak N Jiyeon)
- Nayun (Momoland)
- Seo You Kyung (AOA Black, Sponge★Band and P.AZIT)
- Donghyun/Kim Dong-hyun (Boyfriend)
- Eunji (Brave Girls)
- Yooseung (M.Pire)
- Yeoeun (Melody Day)
- Yujeong (LABOUM)
- Minjae (SONAMOO)
- Chael (LUN8)
- Park Bo Gum (actor)

=== Theater, film and television ===
- Ahn Yong-joon
- Baek Il-seob
- Bong Tae-gyu
- Jeon Mi-do
- Ji Jin-hee
- Jin Ye-sol
- Jo Dong-hyuk
- Jo Hyun-jae
- Kim Nam-gil
- Lee Jung-shik
- Park Bo-gum
- Doyoung(NCT|NCT U|NCT 127|NCT DoJaeJung)
- Jungwoo(NCT|NCT U|NCT 127|NCT DoJaeJung)
- Ryu Soo-young
- Yeon Jung-hoon
